= Dunchon-dong station =

Train station in South Korea

둔촌동; Dunchon-dong
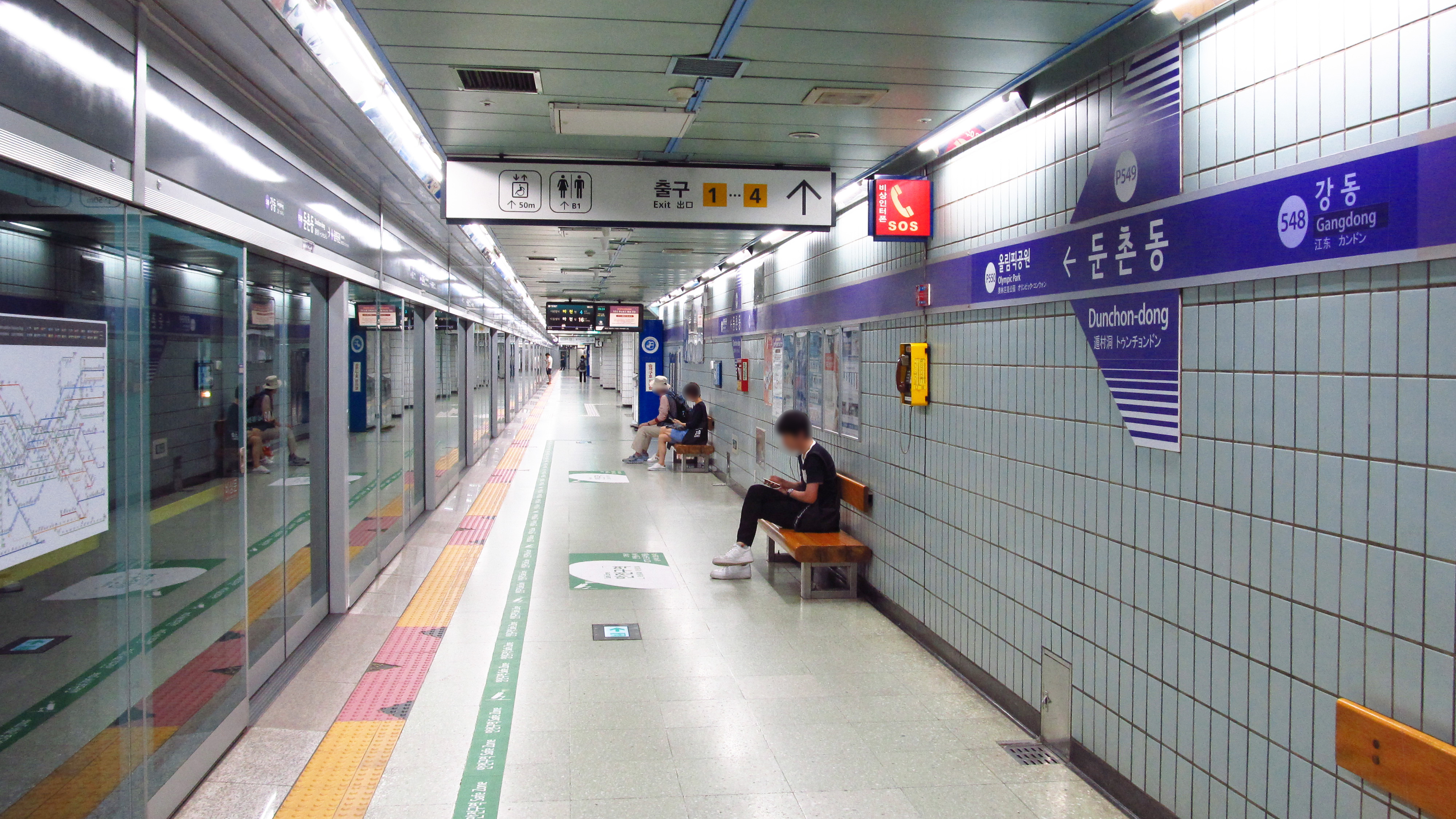
- Station platform in September 2018

Korean name
- Hangul: 둔촌동역
- Hanja: 遁村洞驛
- Revised Romanization: Dunchondong-yeok
- McCune–Reischauer: Tunch'ondong-yŏk

General information
- Location: Yangjaedaero Jiha, 450-39 Seongnae-dong, Gangdong-gu, Seoul
- Coordinates: 37°31′40″N 127°08′10″E
- Operated by: Seoul Metro
- Line(s): Line 5
- Platforms: 2
- Tracks: 2

Construction
- Structure type: Underground

History
- Opened: March 30, 1996

Services
Preceding station	Seoul Metropolitan Subway	Following station
Gangdong towards Banghwa	Line 5 Macheon Branch	Olympic Park towards Macheon

Dunchon-dong is a station on Line 5 of the Seoul Metropolitan Subway. The station is located in the Gangdong District.

== Station layout ==
G	Street level	Exit

L1; Concourse	Lobby	Customer Service, Shops, Vending machines, ATMs

L2; Platforms	Side platform, doors will open on the right
L2; Platforms	Westbound	← Line 5 toward Banghwa (Gangdong)
L2; Platforms	Eastbound	Line 5 toward Macheon (Olympic Park)→
L2; Platforms	Side platform, doors will open on the right
