= Gangdong-gu Office station =

Train station in South Korea

Coordinates: 37°31′51″N 127°07′14″E

강동구청; Gangdong-gu Office
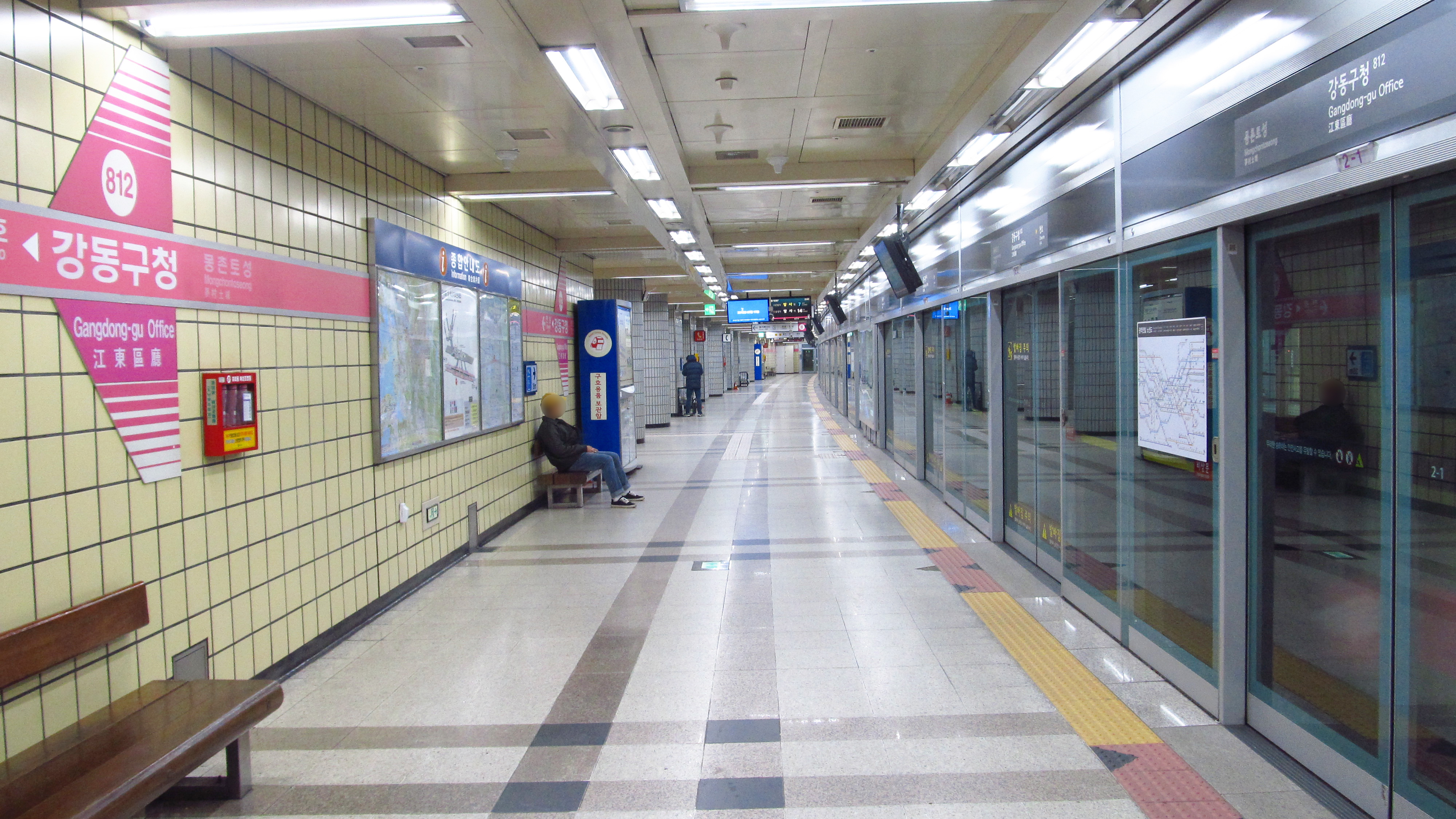

Korean name
- Hangul: 강동구청역
- Hanja: 江東區廳驛
- Revised Romanization: Gangdong-gucheong-yeok
- McCune–Reischauer: Kangdong-gu'chŏng-yŏk

General information
- Location: 319 Seongnae-dong, Gangdong-gu, Seoul
- Operator: Seoul Metro
- Line: Line 8
- Platforms: 2
- Tracks: 2

Construction
- Structure type: Underground

Key dates
- July 2, 1999: Line 8 opened
Location

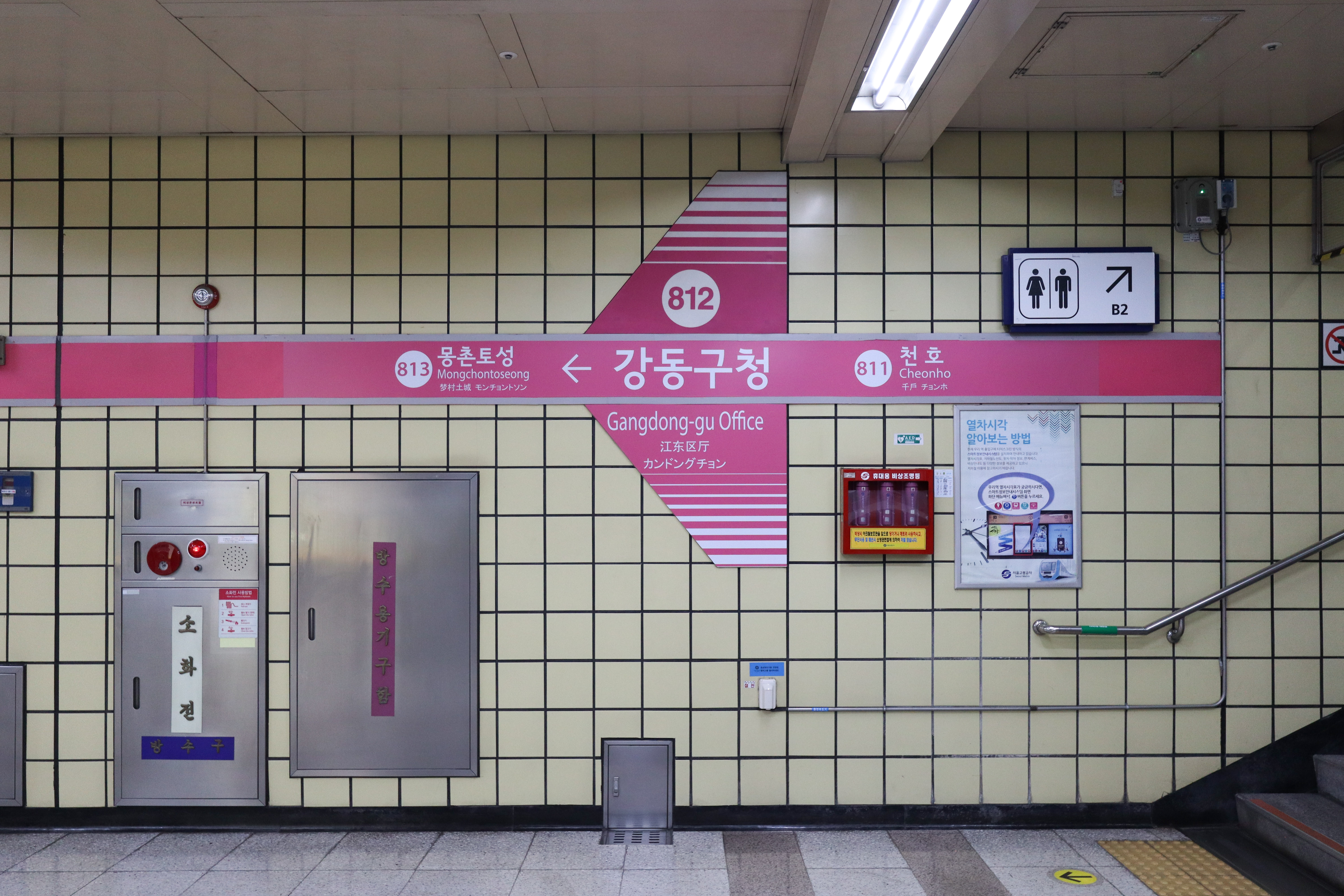
Station nameplate (2024)

Gangdong-gu Office is a station on Seoul Subway Line 8.

== History ==
- July 2, 1999: Operation began with the opening of the Jamsil-Amsa section of Seoul Subway Line 8.
- The history of Gangdong-gu Office begins in 1963, when Seoul was greatly expanded, with Cheonho Branch Office under Seongdong-gu Office, which oversaw Songpa-gu and Gangdong-su. Later, in 1975, the area south of the Han River in Seongdong-gu was divided into Gangnam-gu, and Cheonho Branch Office came under Gangnam-gu Office. Four years later, in 1979, Gangdong-gu was divided. At that time, they tried to expand the Cheonho Branch Office building and use it as a district office, but the building was too small and was too far to the east, so Seoul Gangdong Police Station was built along with the current district office in a rice paddy at the end of Seongnae-dong. After Songpa-gu was divided in the late 1980s, Gangdong Fire Station, Gangdong Health Center, and Waterworks Office were built next to the district office.

== Station structure ==
The platform is operated as a two-sided, two-wire platform and is equipped with a screen door.

== Station layout ==
The platform is operated as a two-sided, two-wire platform and is equipped with a screen door.

Cheonho ↑
S/B | | N/B
↓ Mongchontoseong

Northbound	← ● Line 8 toward Byeollae
Southbound	● Line 8 toward Moran →

== Around the station ==
- 천호사거리
- 성내2파출소
- 천호119안전센터
- 성내동 (서울)|성내동
- 서울강동경찰서
- 서울강동소방서
- 강동구의회
- 강동구청
- 강동구보건소
- 올림픽공원 (서울)|올림픽공원
- 강동대로
- 강동세무서
- 풍납2동
- 올림픽대교
- 송파세무서
- 풍납2동 행정복지센터
- 풍납2동 파출소
- 영파여자중학교
- 영파여자고등학교
- 풍납중학교
- 풍성중학교
- 성내중학교 (서울)|성내중학교
- 서울풍납초등학교
- 서울토성초등학교
- 서울풍성초등학교
- 서울성내초등학교
- 서울성일초등학교
- 강동CGV
- 풍납동성당
- 송파해모로아파트
- 송파현대힐스테이트아파트
- 현대리버빌1지구아파트
- 현대리버빌2지구아파트
- 풍납극동아파트
- 풍납쌍용아파트
- 한강극동아파트
- 신아아파트
- 대아아파트
- 대동아파트
- 풍납미성아파트
- 신동아파밀리에아파트
- 강변현대아파트
- 풍납현대아파트
- 토성현대아파트
- 갑을아파트
- knp상상아파트
- 연지토성아파트
- 성내삼성아파트
- 성내유수지축구장
- 신광교 클라우드 Scheduled for August 2029
- 풍납토성 Earthen Fortification in Pungnap-dong, Seoul

Preceding station	Seoul Metropolitan Subway	Following station
Cheonho towards Byeollae	Line 8	Mongchontoseong towards Moran
