= Gangdong station =

Train station in South Korea

Coordinates: 37°32′09″N 127°07′56″E

강동 (강동성심병원); Gangdong (Kangdong Sacred Heart Hospital)
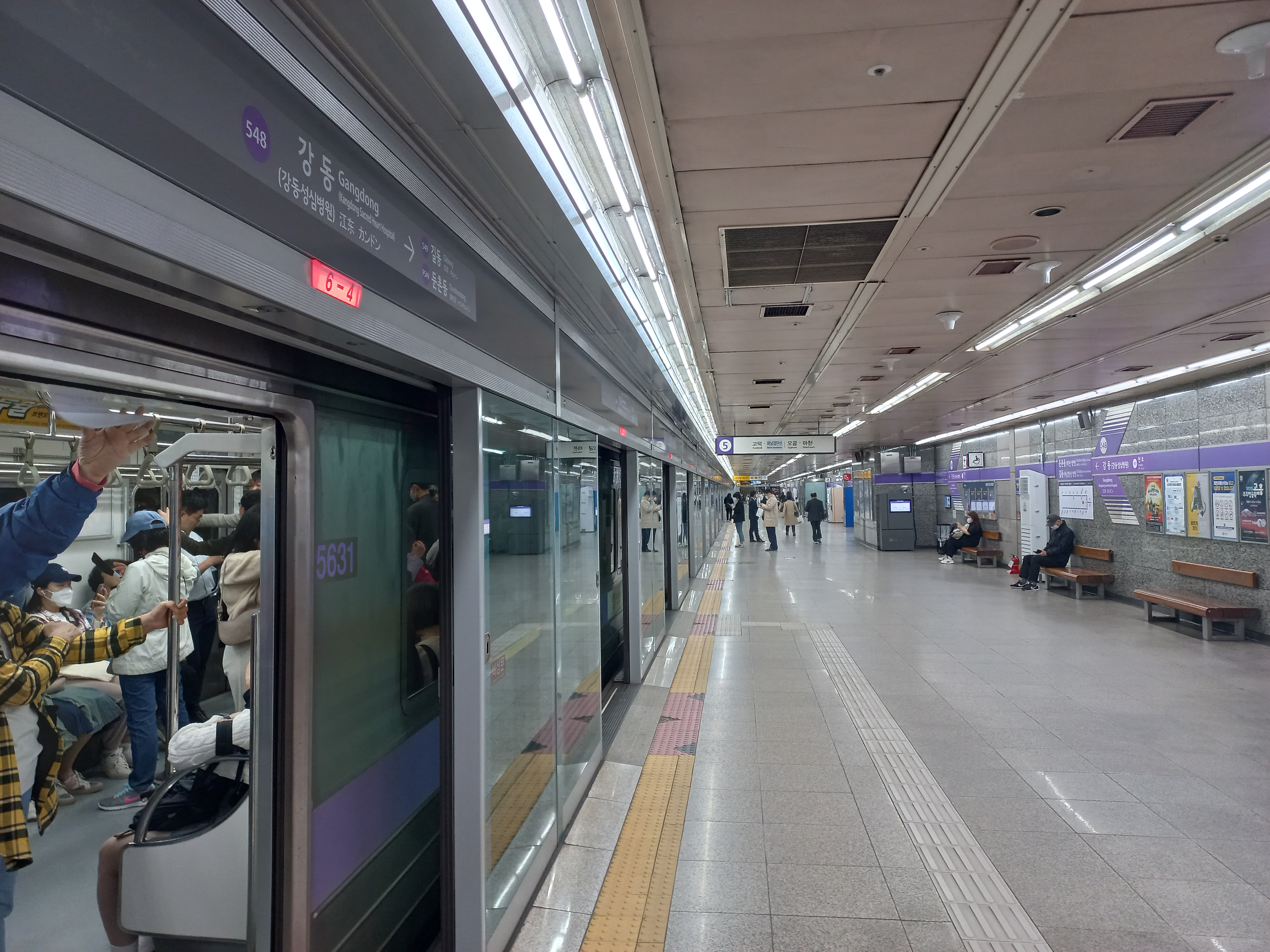
- Station platform

Korean name
- Hangul: 강동역
- Hanja: 江東驛
- RR: Gangdong-yeok
- MR: Kangdong-yŏk

General information
- Location: 1099 Cheonhodaero, 447 Cheonho 3-dong, Gangdong-gu, Seoul
- Operator: Seoul Metro
- Line: Line 5
- Platforms: 2
- Tracks: 3

Construction
- Structure type: Underground

History
- Opened: November 15, 1995

Services
Preceding station	Seoul Metropolitan Subway	Following station
Cheonho towards Banghwa	Line 5	Gil-dong towards Hanam Geomdansan
Cheonho towards Banghwa	Line 5 Macheon Branch	Dunchon-dong towards Macheon
Location

Gangdong station (Korean: 강동역; lit. 'river east station') is a station on Seoul Subway Line 5. The line branches off to the northeast and the southeast at this point, with Gil-dong station to the northeast and Dunchon-dong station to the southeast. Cheonho station precedes it on the west.

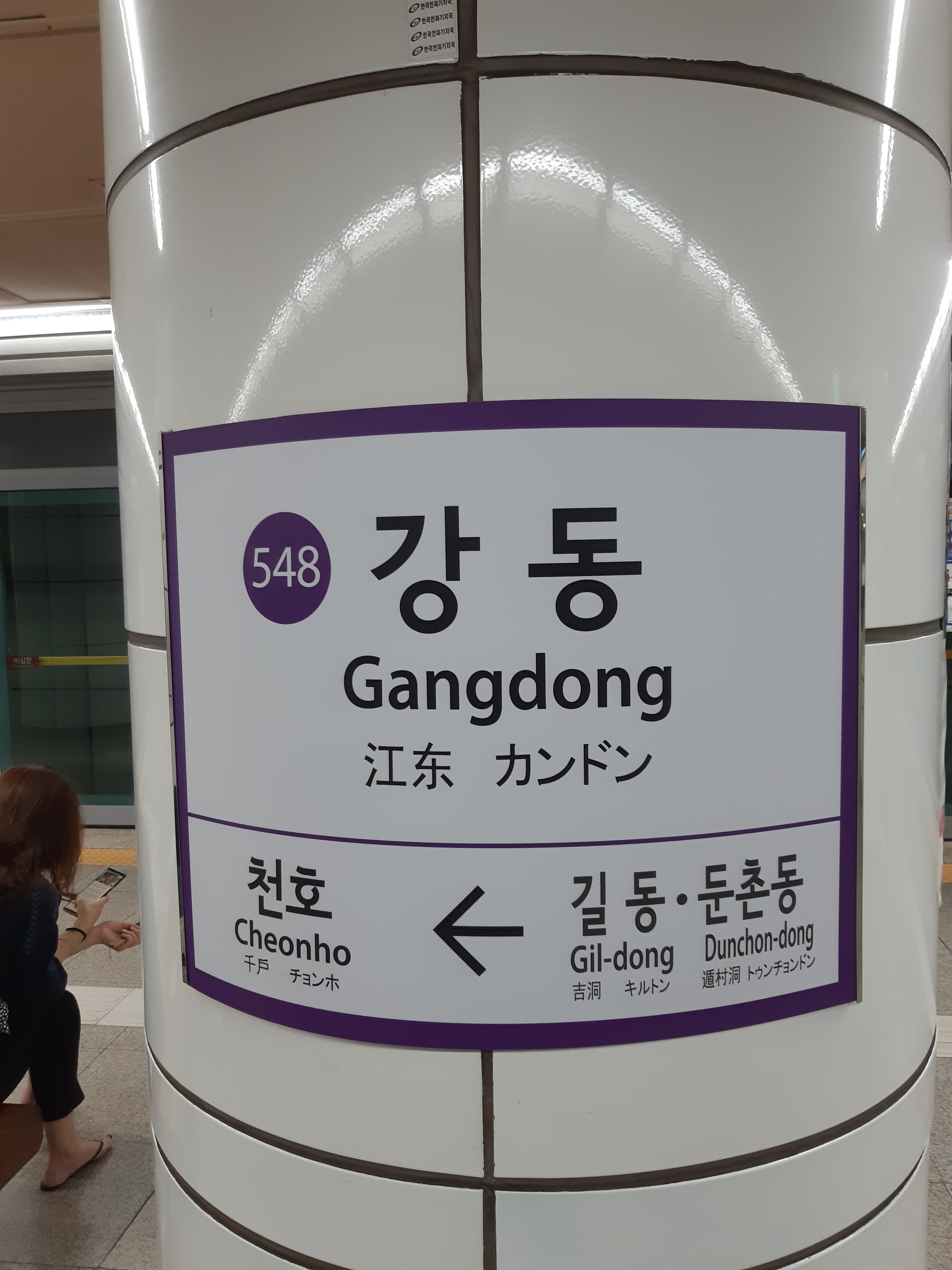
Station nameplate (pillar)

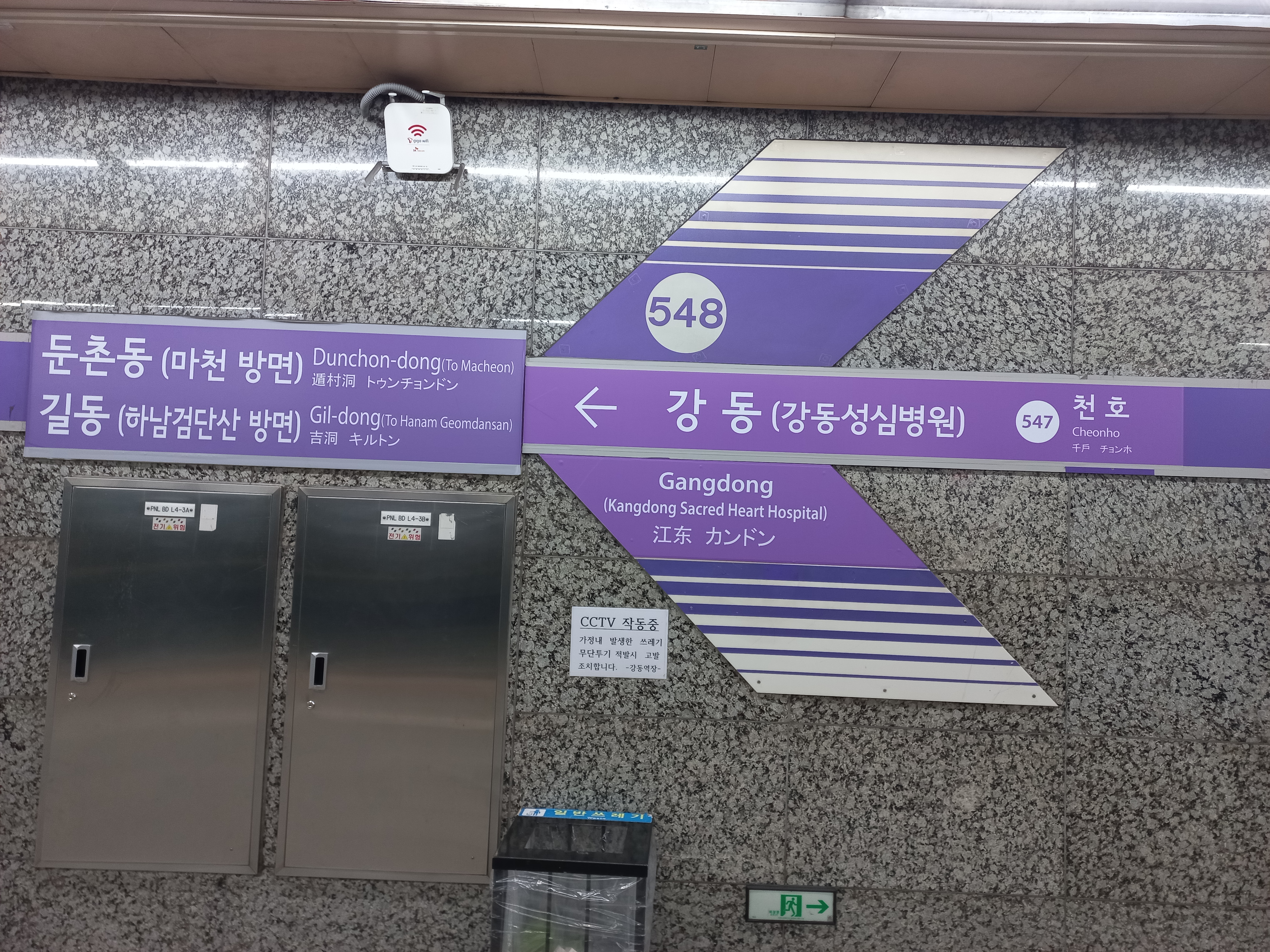
Station nameplate (wall)

== History ==
November 15, 1995: Business began with the opening of the section between Wangsimni station and Sangil-dong station on Seoul Subway Line 5. March 30, 1996: It became a transfer station with the opening of the Gangdong station to Macheon station section of Line 5's Macheonji line. August 1, 2016: Bugi station name changed to Gangdong Sacred Heart Hospital. August 2019: Bugi station name deleted due to expiration of contract period.

== Station structure ==
It is an underground station with a 2-sided, 3-track platform, and the first side, 2 tracks, are used by trains bound for Banghwa, and the remaining side, 1 track, facing the Banghwa-bound island platform, is used by trains bound for Hanam Geomdansan and Macheon on Line 5. In the case of the down train, the trains bound for Hanam Geomdansan and the train bound for Macheon enter alternately on the same track, so you must check the destination again before boarding. In the case of the up train, there is a track right next to the down track and a track opposite it. Trains bound for Banghwa enter both tracks, and of these, the track right next to the down track passes through Gil-dong in the direction of Hanam Geomdansan, and the track opposite it passes through Dunchon-dong station in the direction of Macheon. You can board either train and go to Cheonho.

== Station layout ==
G	Street level	Exit

L1; Concourse	Lobby	Customer service, shops, vending machines, ATMs

L2; Platforms	Westbound	← Line 5 toward Banghwa (Cheonho)
L2; Platforms	Island platform, doors will open on the left
L2; Platforms	Westbound	← Line 5 toward Banghwa (Cheonho)
L2; Platforms	Wall
L2; Platforms	Eastbound	Line 5 toward Hanam Geomdansan or Macheon (Gil-dong or Dunchon-dong)→
L2; Platforms	Side platform, doors will open on the right

== Around the station ==
- Dongshin Middle School
- Hallym University Gangdong Sacred Heart Hospital
- Gangdong Tax Office
- KT 강동지사
- 강동구청 Gangdong-gu Office
