= Gwangnaru station =

Train station in South Korea

Coordinates: 37°32′43″N 127°06′13″E

광나루 (장신대); Gwangnaru (Presbyterian Univ. & Theological Seminary)
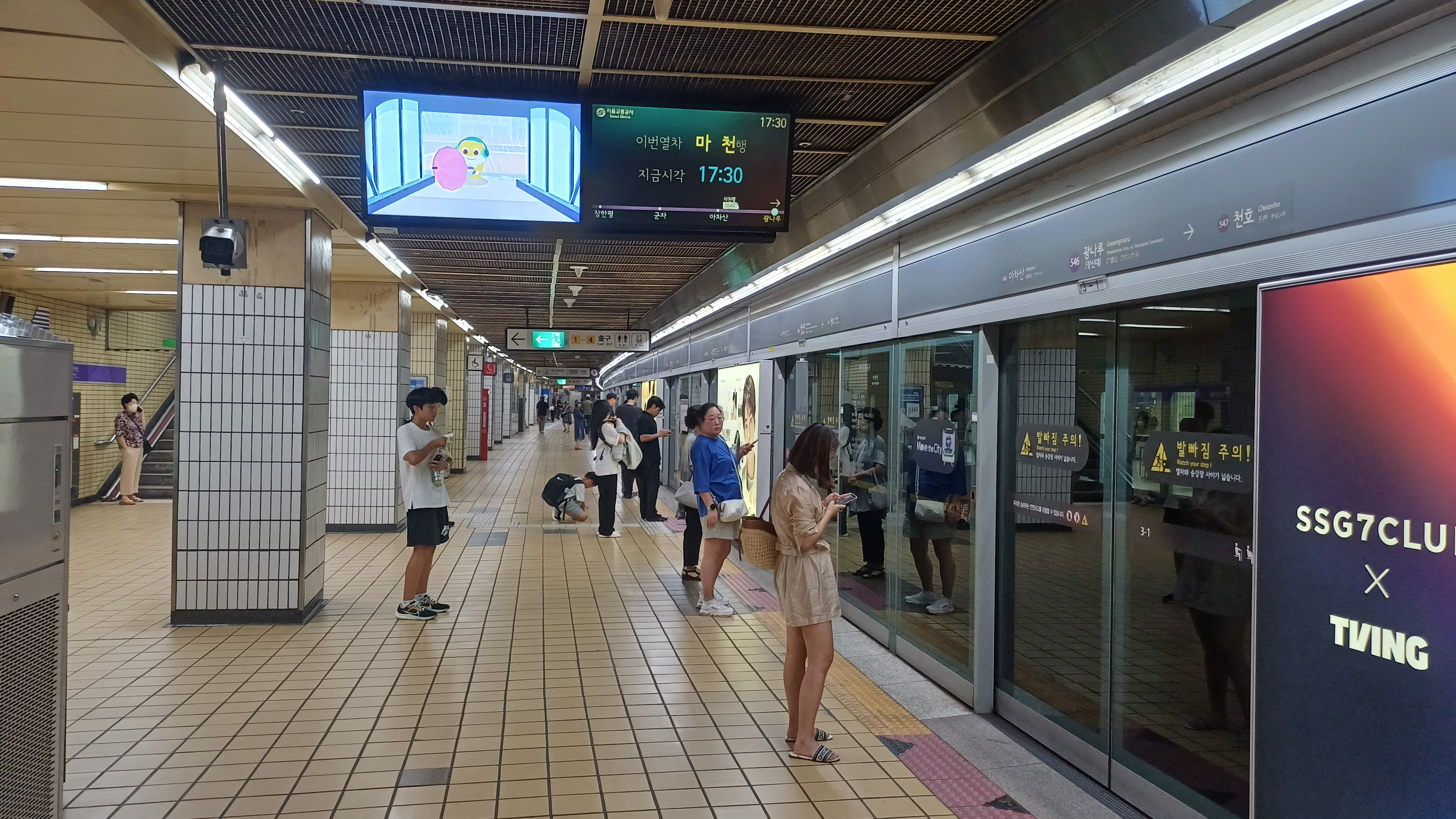
- Station Platform

Korean name
- Hangul: 광나루역
- Hanja: 廣나루驛
- Revised Romanization: Gwangnaru-yeok
- McCune–Reischauer: Kwangnaru-yŏk

General information
- Location: 571 Achasanno Jiha, 237 Gwangjang-dong, Gwangjin-gu, Seoul
- Operator: Seoul Metro
- Line: Line 5
- Platforms: 2
- Tracks: 2

Construction
- Structure type: Underground

History
- Opened: November 15, 1995

Services
Preceding station	Seoul Metropolitan Subway	Following station
Achasan towards Banghwa	Line 5	Cheonho towards Hanam Geomdansan or Macheon
Location

Gwangnaru Station is a station on the Seoul Subway Line 5 in Gwangjin-gu, Seoul. Its station subname is Presbyterian Univ. & Theological Seminary, where said university is nearby Exit 2.

The platform is a two-sided, two-line curved platform with screen doors.

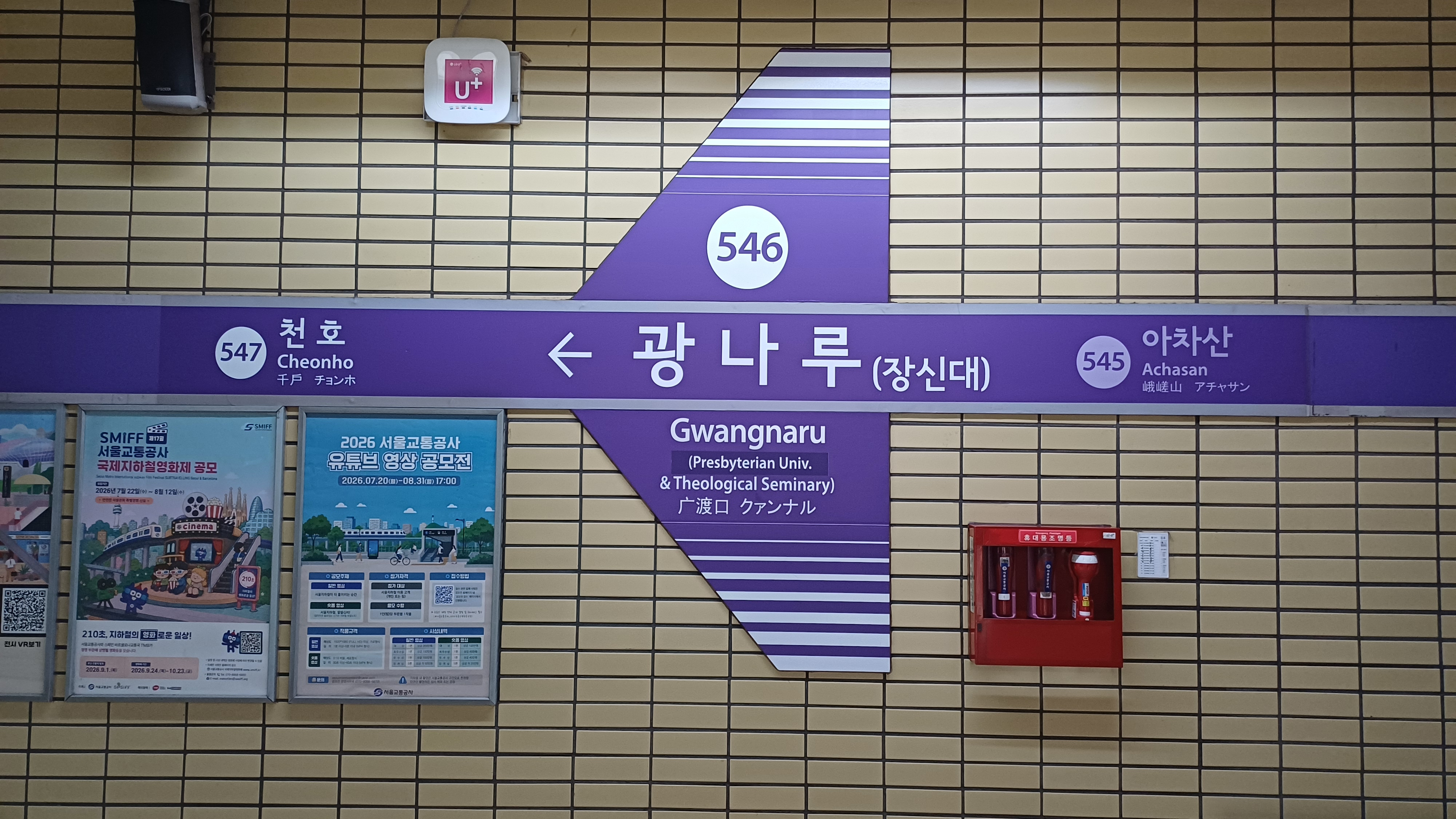
Station nameplate

== Station layout ==
G	Street level	Exit

L1; Concourse	Lobby	Customer Service, Shops, Vending machines, ATMs

L2; Platforms	Side platform, doors will open on the right
L2; Platforms	Westbound	← Line 5 toward Banghwa (Achasan)
L2; Platforms	Eastbound	Line 5 toward Hanam Geomdansan or Macheon (Cheonho)→
L2; Platforms	Side platform, doors will open on the right

== Vicinity ==
- Exit 1: Gwangjang Elementary and Middle Schools
- Exit 2: W Seoul Walkerhill, Presbyterian College and Theological Seminary
- Exit 3: Gwangnam Elementary, Middle & High Schools
- Exit 4: Yangjin Elementary & Middle Schools
- All exits: Gwangjin Public Digital Library
