= Lee Hae-sik =

South Korean politician (born 1963)

- 이해식
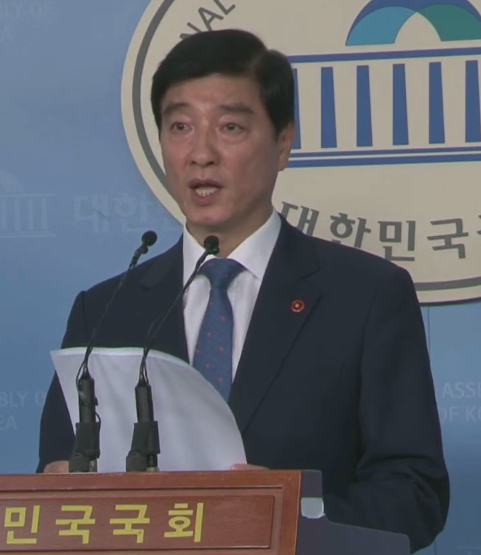

Member of the National Assembly
- Incumbent
- Assumed office 30 May 2020
- Preceded by: Shim Jae-gwon
- Constituency: Seoul Gangdong B

Mayor of Seoul Gangdong District
- In office 5 June 2008 – 30 June 2018
- Preceded by: Shin Dong-woo; Choi Yong-ho (acting); Kim Kang-yeol (acting)
- Succeeded by: Lee Jung-hoon

Personal details
- Born: 13 November 1963 (age 63)
- Party: Democratic
- Education: Sogang University; University of Seoul
- Religion: Roman Catholic (Christian name : Stephen)

Korean name
- Hangul: 이해식
- Hanja: 李海植
- RR: I Haesik
- MR: I Haesik

Lee Hae-sik (Korean: 이해식; born 13 November 1963) is a South Korean politician who has served as an elected official of Gangdong District of Seoul at various levels from 1995. Lee is currently representing Gangdong at the National Assembly with Jin Sun-mee.

== Pre-mayor career ==
Lee was the first president of the student union of his alma mater after it was restored in 1980

He first entered politics in 1992 as one of secretaries of Lee Boo-young who has served as a National Assembly member from Gangdong from 1992 to 2004.

In 1995 Lee became the youngest member to join Gangdong District Council at the age of 31 and with the most vote.

In 2003 Lee left conservative Hannara party and joined liberal Uri Party following his mentor Lee Boo-young along with Kim Boo-kyum and Kim Young-choon. After losing the election in 2004, he worked for his mentor, then-party leader, again as his deputy chief of staff.

== Mayor of Gangdong District ==
In 2006 local election, only Hannara party candidates were elected as Seoul's 25 districts mayors. In 2008 bi-election, Lee was elected as the mayor of Gangdong becoming the only non-Hannara party district mayor in Seoul from 2006 to 2010. He was also the youngest district mayor of Seoul to have been elected three times consecutively.

As a mayor Lee installed the stray cat food stations with help from volunteers, animal food manufacturer and Kang Full - the first of this kind in the nation - and adopted Trap–neuter–return policy to solve the causes of complaints on stray cats and improve animal welfare. Its "Eco-friendly Urban Gardens" where its citizens grow their own vegetables and fruits and the self-learning centre are other examples of policies that were first adopted in the nation under mayor Lee. The district also became the first Seoul's district to introduce "green," organic lunch to its students at schools.

Moreover, Lee introduced policies transforming the district into "children-friendly and healthy" city which were recognised by international bodies such as UNICEF and World Health Organization.

In 2018 he completed his final term as mayor without resigning for the 2016 general election. This has come to attention due to two consecutive mayors before Lee who all resigned for the general elections resulting in 4 mayor elections in 6 years.

== Post-mayor career ==
After serving as the Mayor for three times, the maximum term limit, Lee joined his party leader Lee Hae-chan's cabinet as one of party's spokespersons. He earned his party's nomination for the 2020 general election defeating the incumbent, three-term parliamentarian Shim Jae-gwon.

== Education ==
Lee holds two degrees from Sogang University—a bachelor in philosophy and a master's in politics. Lee also completed a doctorate programme on administration from University of Seoul.

== Electoral history ==
Election	Year	Post	Party affiliation	Votes	Percentage of votes	Results
1st Local Election	1995	Member of Seoul Gangdong Council Sangil-dong	Independent	5,752	37.00%	Won
2nd Local Election	1998	Member of Seoul Metropolitan Council from Gangdong 2nd	Grand National Party	24,386	55.39%	Won
3rd Local Election	2002	Member of Seoul Metropolitan Council from Gangdong 2nd	Grand National Party	28,449	64.25%	Won
2004 By-election	2004	Mayor of Seoul Gangdong	Uri Party	28,496	35.40%	Lost (2nd)
2008 By-election	2008	Mayor of Seoul Gangdong	Democratic Party (2008)	45,239	53.33%	Won
5th Local Election	2010	Mayor of Seoul Gangdong	Democratic Party (2008)	127,350	59.73%	Won
6th Local Election	2014	Mayor of Seoul Gangdong	New Politics Alliance for Democracy (NPAD)	136,049	58.80%	Won
21st General Election	2020	Member of National Assembly from Seoul Gangdong B	Democratic Party (2015)	59,175	54.54%	Won
22nd General Election	2020	Member of National Assembly from Seoul Gangdong B	Democratic Party (2015)	71,376	53.55%	Won
