= Achasan station =

Station of the Seoul Metropolitan Subway

Coordinates: 37°33′07″N 127°05′23″E

아차산 (어린이대공원후문); Achasan (Rear Entrance to Seoul Children's Grand Park)
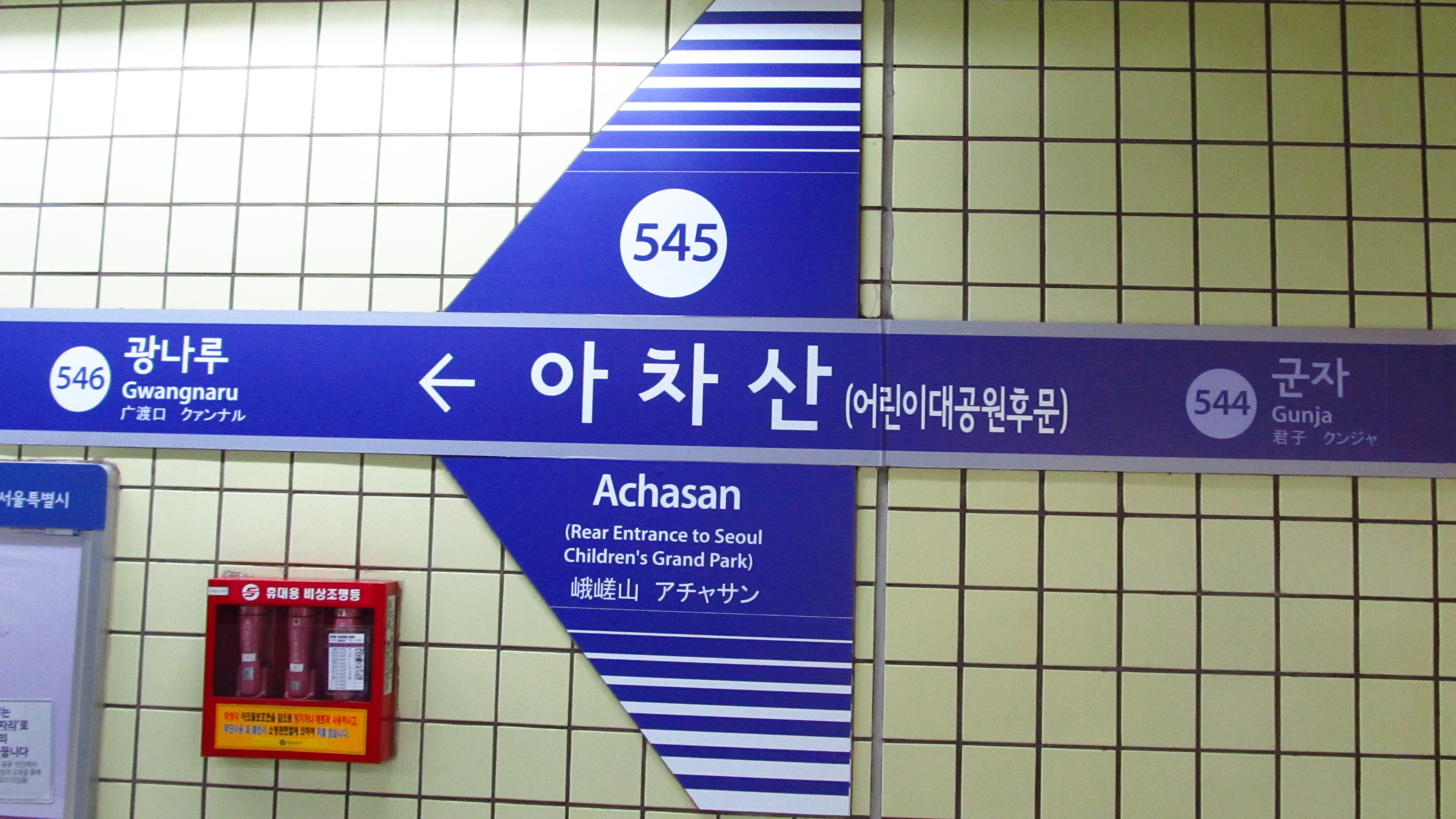

Korean name
- Hangul: 아차산역
- Hanja: 峨嵯山驛
- RR: Achasan-yeok
- MR: Ach'asan-yŏk

General information
- Location: 657 Cheonhodaero Jiha, 256-16 Neung-dong, Gwangjin District, Seoul
- Operator: Seoul Metro
- Line: Line 5
- Platforms: 2
- Tracks: 2

Construction
- Structure type: Underground

History
- Opened: November 15, 1995

Services
Preceding station	Seoul Metropolitan Subway	Following station
Gunja towards Banghwa	Line 5	Gwangnaru towards Hanam Geomdansan or Macheon
Location

Achasan station (Korean: 아차산역), having the subname Rear Entrance to Seoul Children's Grand Park, is a subway station on Line 5 of the Seoul Metropolitan Subway. Located in Gwangjin District, in Seoul, South Korea the station is near the rear entrance of Seoul Children's Grand Park.

== Station layout ==
G	Street level	Exit

L1; Concourse	Lobby	Customer Service, Shops, Vending machines, ATMs

L2; Platforms	Side platform, doors will open on the right
L2; Platforms	Westbound	← Line 5 toward Banghwa (Gunja)
L2; Platforms	Eastbound	Line 5 toward Hanam Geomdansan or Macheon (Gwangnaru)→
L2; Platforms	Side platform, doors will open on the right

== Gallery ==
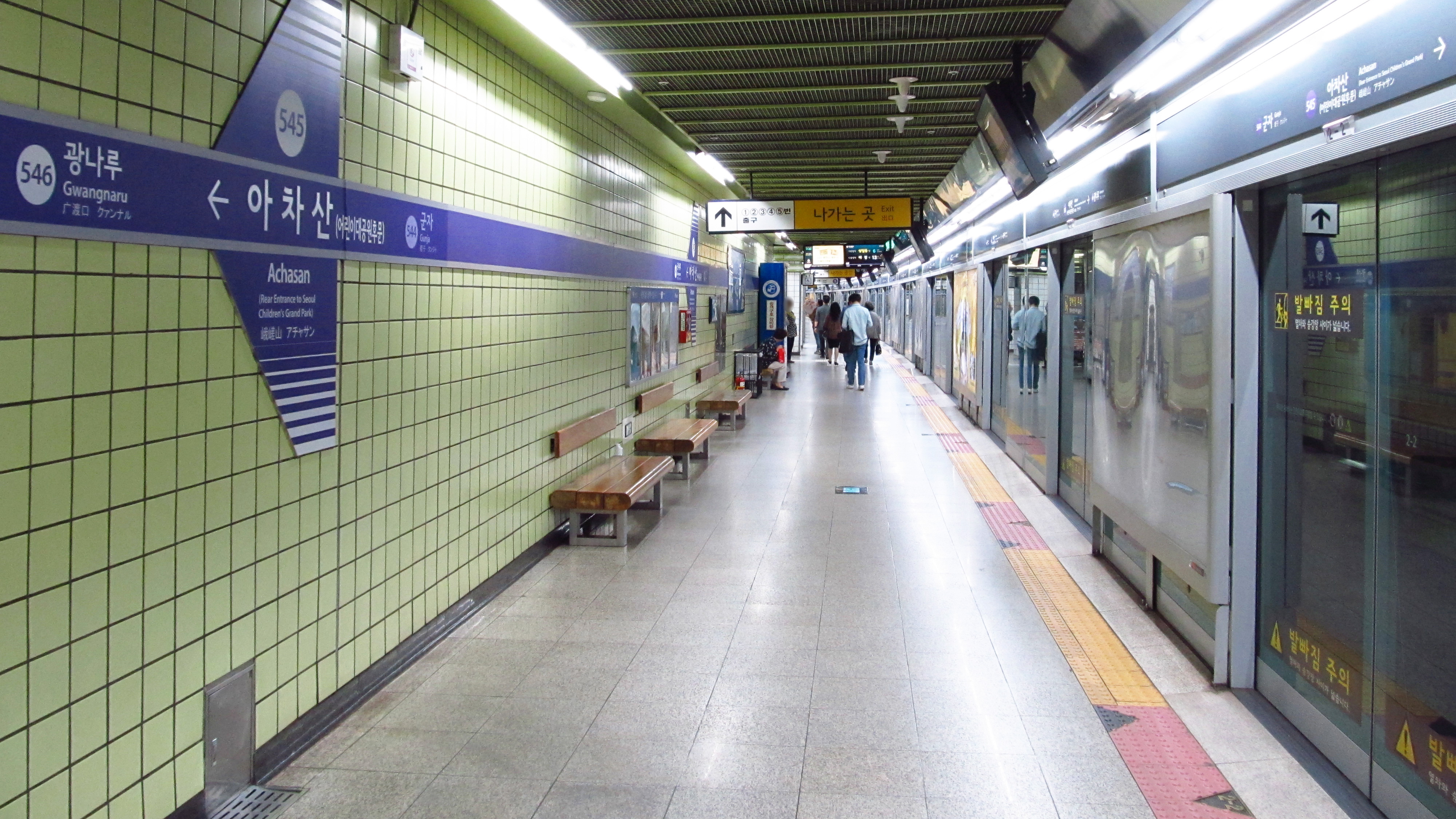
Achasan station, 2018
