= Gil-dong =

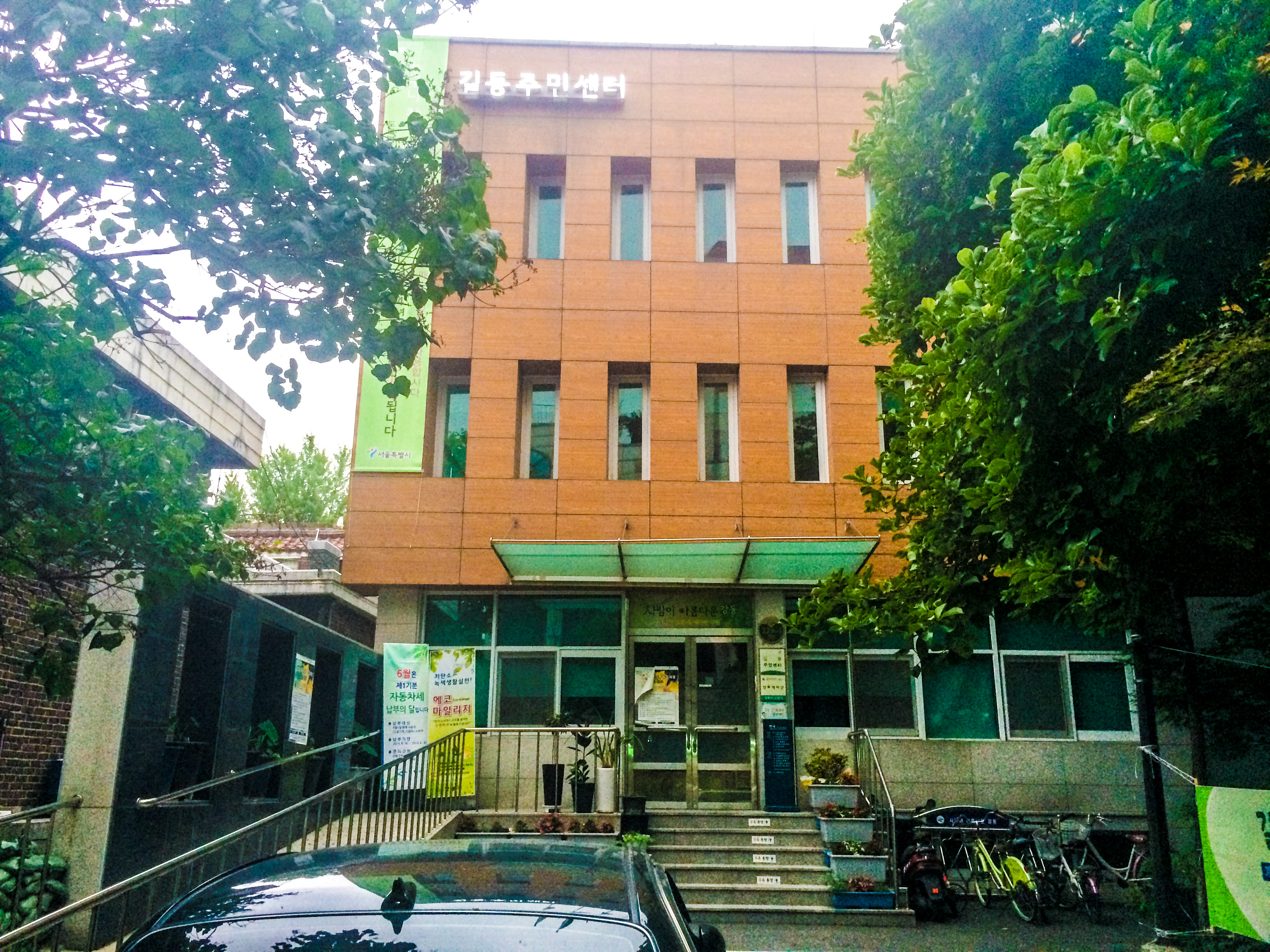
- Gil-dong Community Service Center
- Interactive map of Gil-dong
- Country: South Korea

Area
  - Total: 2.17 km^{2} (0.84 sq mi)

Population (2001)
  - Total: 50,568
  - Density: 23,303/km^{2} (60,350/sq mi)

Korean name
- Hangul: 길동
- Hanja: 吉洞
- RR: Gil-dong
- MR: Kil-tong

Gil-dong (Korean: 길동) is a dong (neighborhood) of Gangdong District, Seoul, South Korea.

== History ==
Gil-dong is geographically located far away from the Han River, so the natives believe this area is easy to be settled and safe to avoid any damage from storm and flood, based on feng shui Theory. In 1995, Seoul Subway Line 5 was passed through this area stopping at Gil-dong Station. On the area of Gil-dong, Gangdong Public Library, Sinmyung Middle School, Kangdong Sacred Heart Hospital of Hallym University and a Leadership Training Institute of Doosan Group named Yeongangwon is located.

== Area information ==
The current postal code of Gil-dong is 134–010. 134 is for Gangdong District and 010 is for Gil-dong.

== Notable people from Gil-dong ==
- Choi Ye-na (최예나), singer, rapper, dancer, entertainer and K-pop/J-pop idol, former member of K-pop/J-pop girlgroup Iz*One.

== See also ==
- Administrative divisions of Gangdong District
- Administrative divisions of Seoul
- Administrative divisions of South Korea
