= Gil-dong station =

Metro station in South Korea

Coordinates: 37°32′16″N 127°08′24″E

| 길동; Gil-dong |
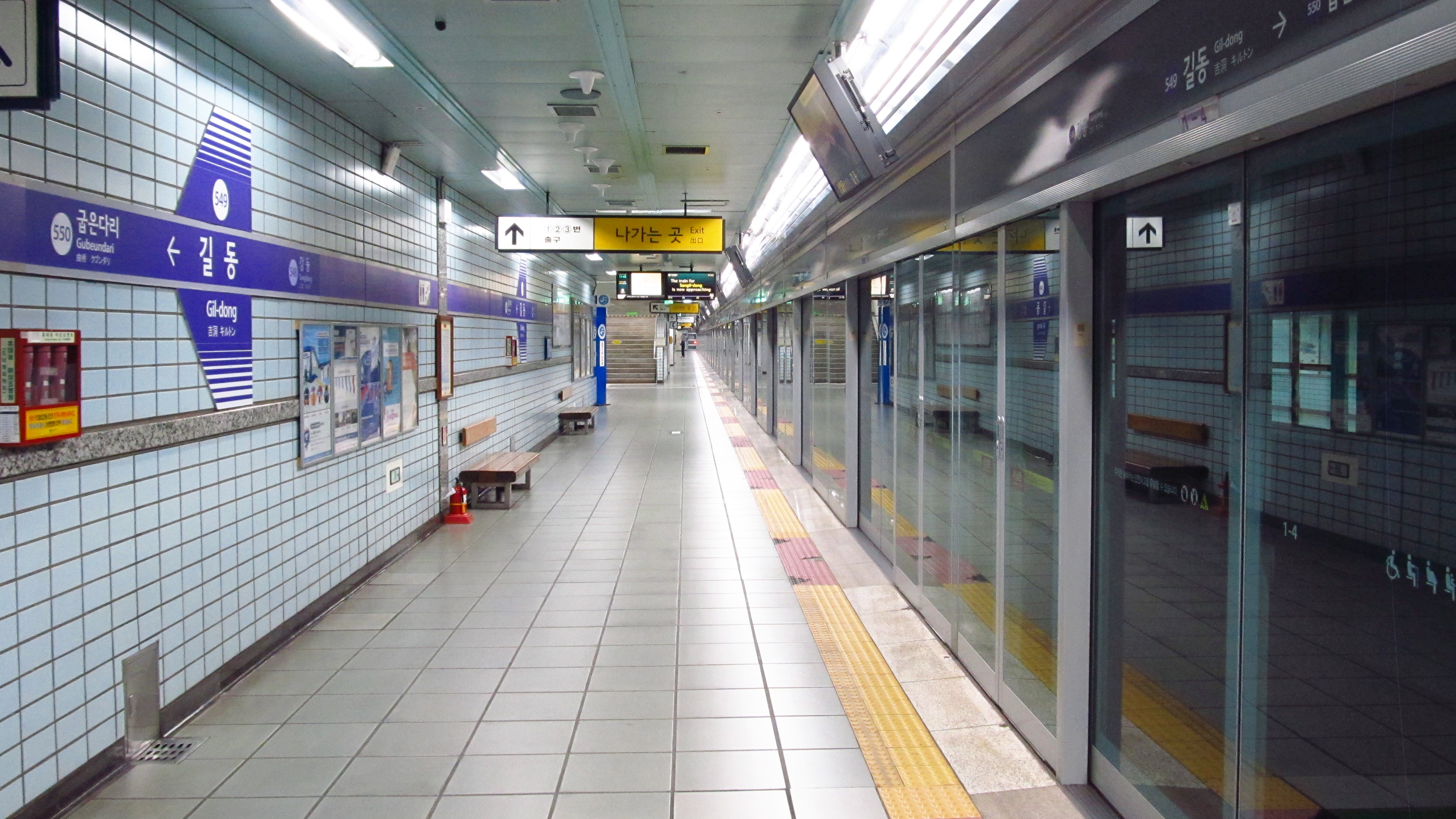

Korean name
- Hangul: 길동역
- Hanja: 吉洞驛
- Revised Romanization: Gildong-yeok
- McCune–Reischauer: Kiltong-yŏk

General information
- Location: 7 Yangjaedaero 115-gil, 378 Gil-dong, Gangdong-gu, Seoul
- Operator: Seoul Metro
- Line: Line 5
- Platforms: 2
- Tracks: 2

Construction
- Structure type: Underground

History
- Opened: November 15, 1995

Services
| Preceding station | Seoul Metropolitan Subway | Following station |
|---|---|---|
| Gangdong towards Banghwa | Line 5 | Gubeundari towards Hanam Geomdansan |
Location

Gil-dong Station is a subway station on Seoul Subway Line 5 in Gangdong District, Seoul. There is a connecting track from this station to Dunchon-dong Station on the Macheonji Line of Line 5, but it is a return train track for the arrival and departure of the Godeok Vehicle Business Office and has nothing to do with passenger operations.

== Station layout ==
| G | Street level | Exit |

| L1; Concourse | Lobby | Customer Service, Shops, Vending machines, ATMs |

| L2; Platforms | Side platform, doors will open on the right |
| L2; Platforms | Westbound | ← Line 5 toward Banghwa (Gangdong) |
| L2; Platforms | Eastbound | Line 5 toward Hanam Geomdansan (Gubeundari)→ |
| L2; Platforms | Side platform, doors will open on the right |

== Vicinity ==
- Exit 1 : Cheondong Elementary School
- Exit 2 : Gildong Elementary School, Gangdong Library
- Exit 3 : Gangdong Post Office
