= Gangdong District =

District of Seoul, South Korea

Gangdong
- Autonomous District
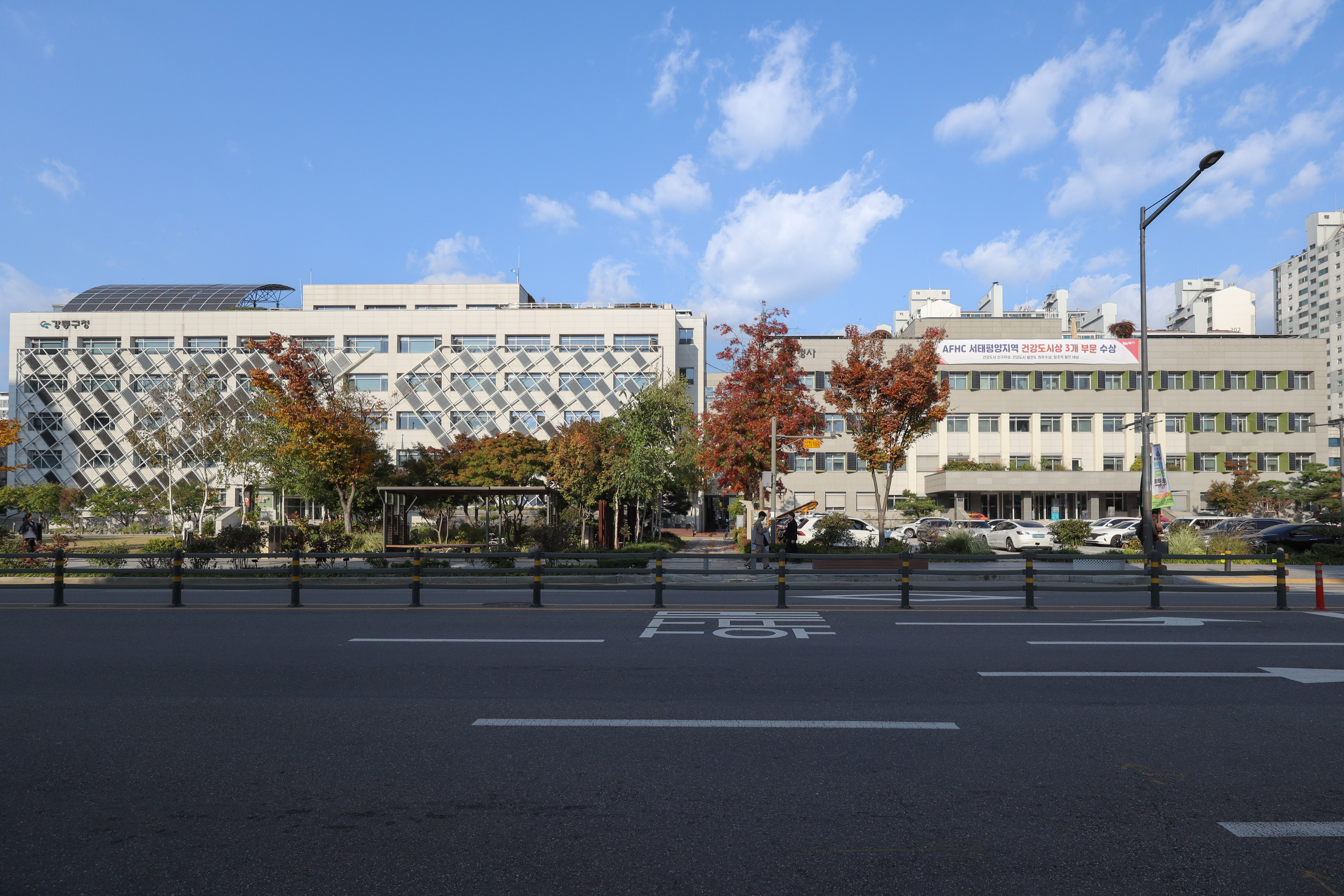
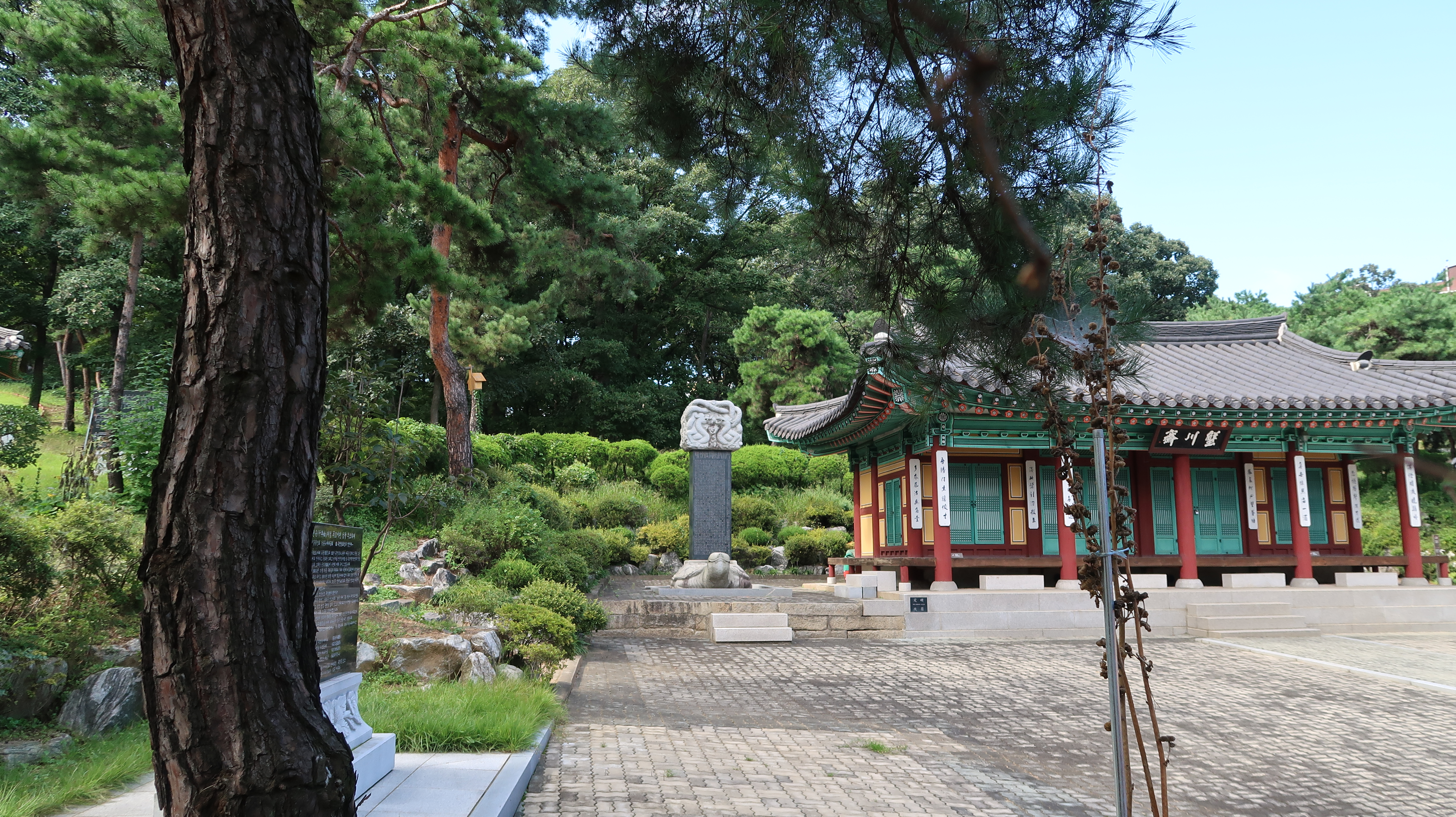
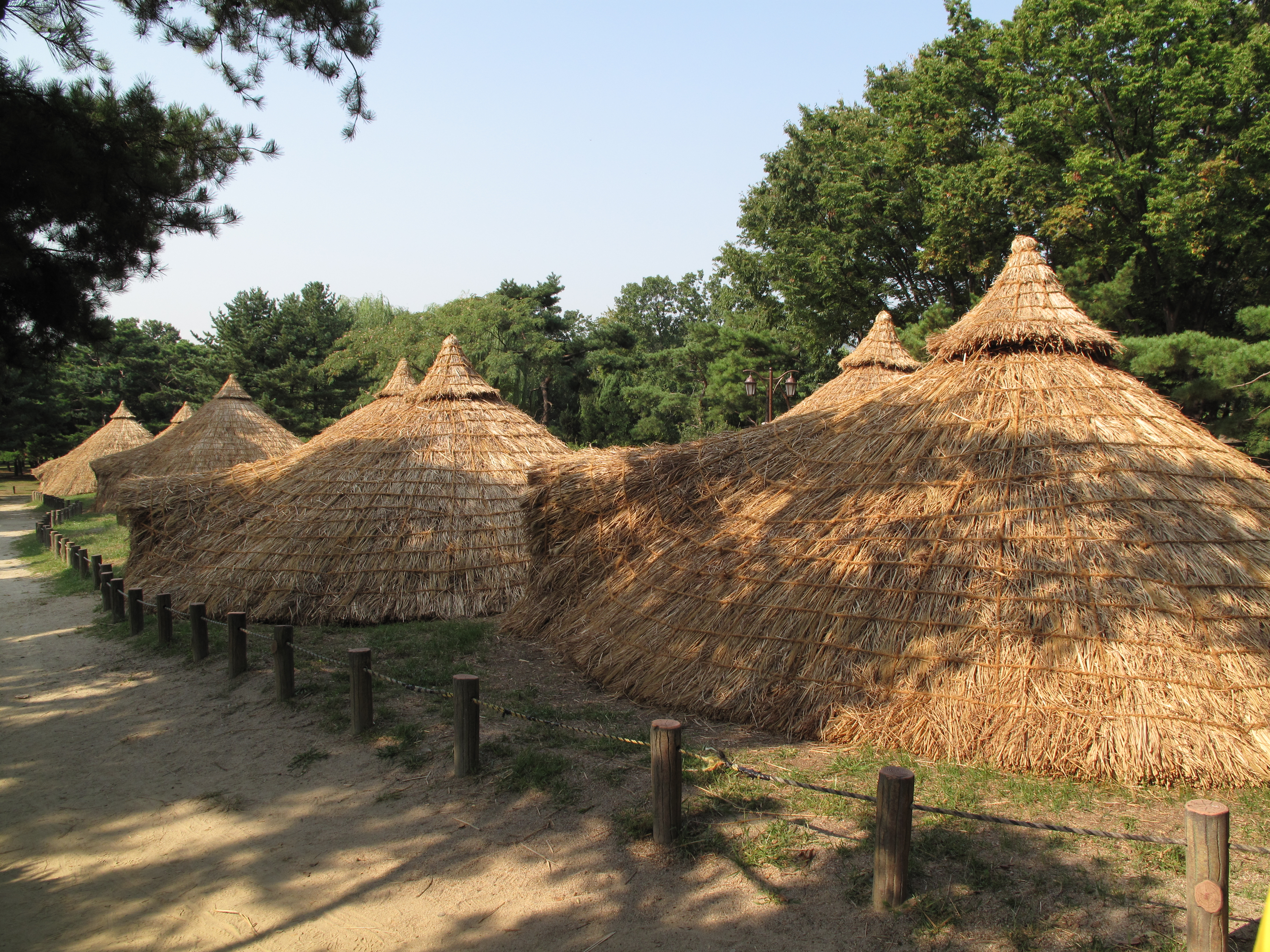
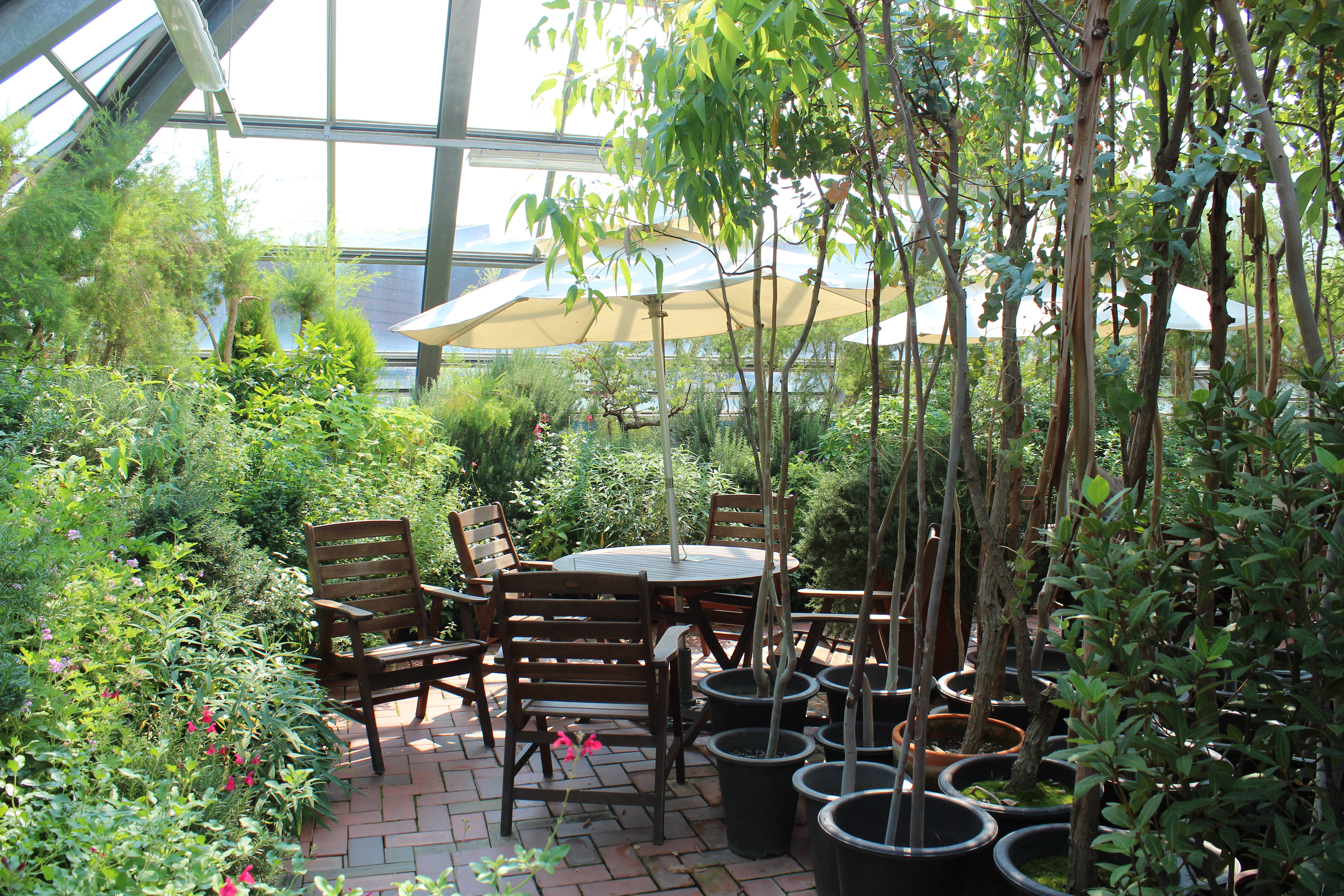
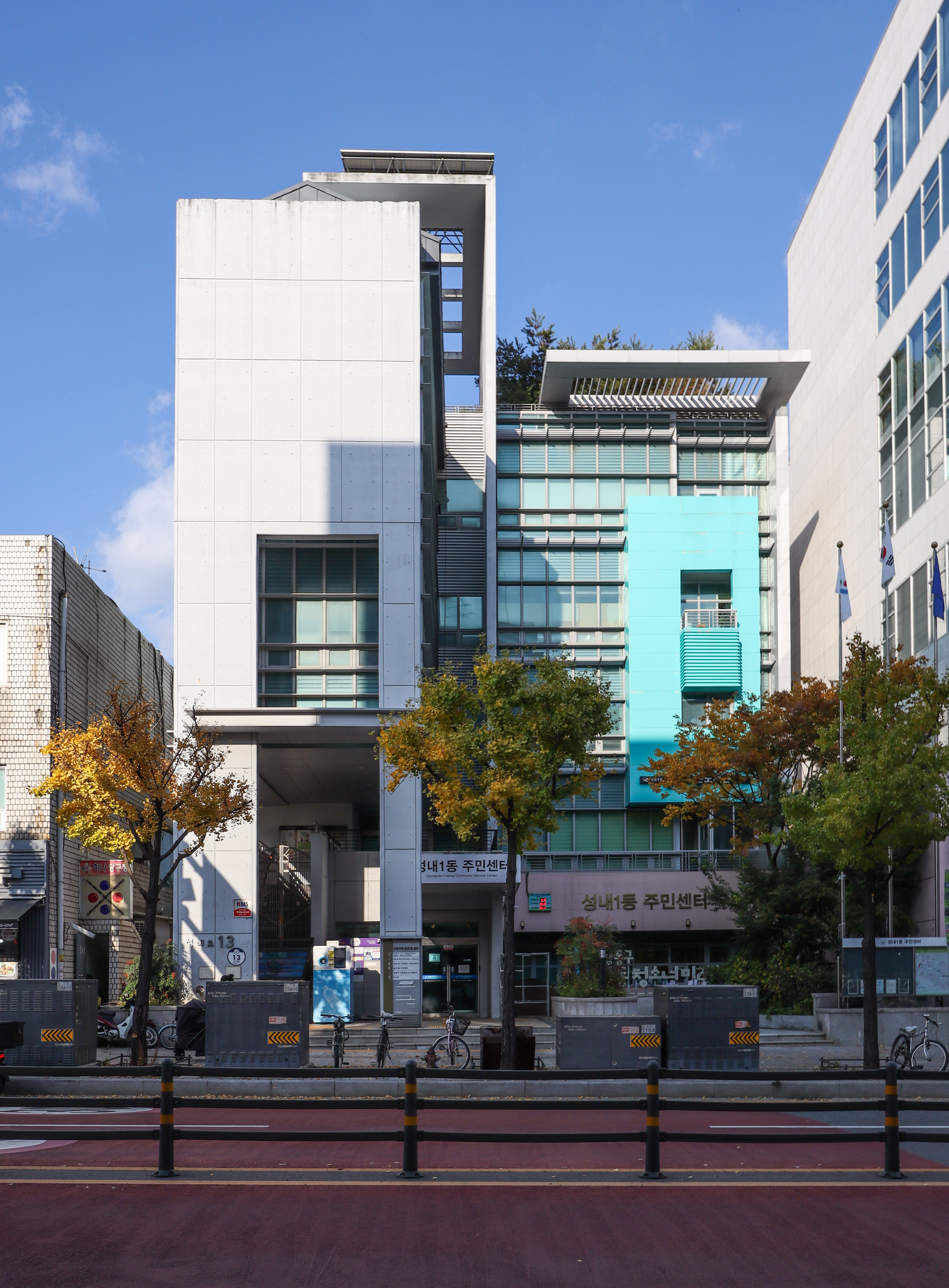
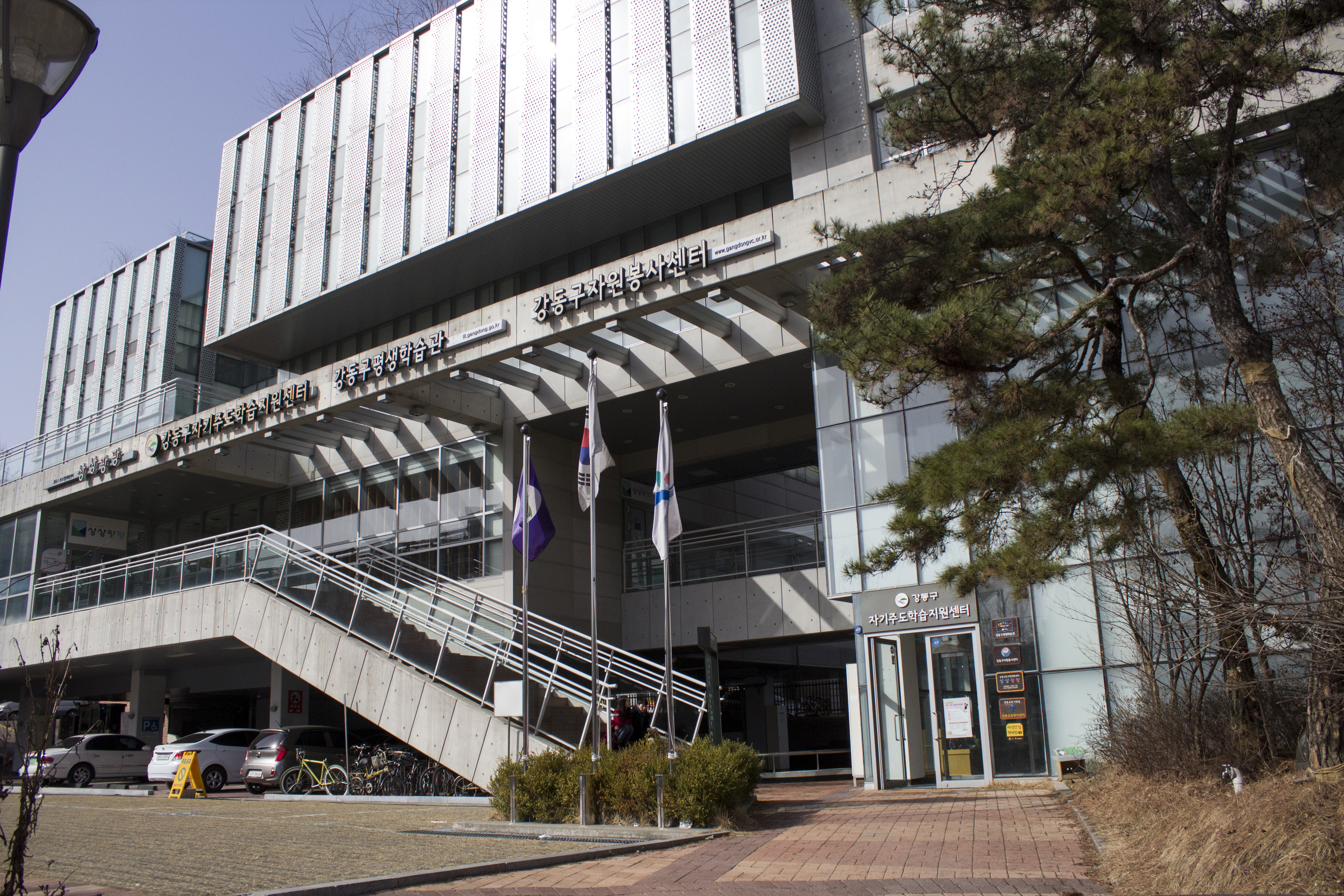
- Gangdong-gu Office Graveyard of Munhuigong Yu Chang Amsa–dong Prehistoric Settlement Site Herb Astronomy Park Seongnae 1-dong Community service center Gangdong-gu Study Center

- Flag

- Location of Gangdong District in Seoul
- Interactive map of Gangdong
- Coordinates: 37°31′48″N 127°07′26″E
- Country: South Korea
- Region: Sudogwon
- Special City: Seoul
- Administrative dong: 21

Government
  - Body: Gangdong-gu Council
  - Mayor: Lee Soo-Hee (People Power)
  - MNAs: List of MNAs: Jin Sun-mee (Democratic); Lee Hae-sik (Democratic)

Area
  - Total: 24.587 km^{2} (9.493 sq mi)

Population (2024)
  - Total: 465,807
  - Density: 18,945/km^{2} (49,068/sq mi)
- Time zone: UTC+9 (Korea Standard Time)
- Postal code: 05200 – 05499
- Area code(s): +82-2-400~
- Website: Gangdong District official website

Korean name
- Hangul: 강동구
- Hanja: 江東區
- RR: Gangdong-gu
- MR: Kangdong-gu

Gangdong District (Korean: 강동구) is one of the 25 districts that make up the city of Seoul. Gangdong, literally means "east of river". Jungbu (literally "central part") Express Motorway starts in and passes through Sangil-dong, which is located in the east end of this district. In Amsa-dong, there is a pre-historic heritage site, which is about six thousand years old. On the site, you can find many potteries and houses. The pottery which has been found was made of ceramic and is circular and shaped into a point similar to corn.

== Administrative divisions ==
Administrative divisions

- Gangil-dong (강일동 江一洞)
- Godeok-dong (고덕동 高德洞)
- Gil-dong (길동 吉洞)
- Dunchon-dong (둔촌동 遁村洞)
- Myeongil-dong (명일동 明逸洞)
- Sangil-dong (상일동 上一洞)
- Seongnae-dong (성내동 城內洞)
- Amsa-dong (암사동 岩寺洞)
- Cheonho-dong (천호동 千戶洞)

== Education ==
Gangdong District is home to 25 elementary schools, 17 junior high schools and 12 senior high schools, including a specialized high school (Hanyoung Foreign Language High School), and a special education school (Jumong School).

== Transportation ==
=== Railroad (Seoul Metro) ===
- Seoul Subway Line 5

(Gwangjin-gu) ← Cheonho — Gangdong — Gil-dong — Gubeundari — Myeongil — Godeok — Sangil-dong

- Seoul Subway Line 5 Macheon Branch

Gangdong — Dunchon-dong → (Songpa-gu)

- Seoul Subway Line 8

Amsa — Cheonho — Gangdong-gu Office → (Songpa-gu)

== Sister cities ==
- Bonghwa, South Korea
- Buyeo, South Korea
- Cheongyang, South Korea
- Eumseong, South Korea
- Fengtai, China
- Geochang, South Korea
- Gokseong, South Korea
- Gyeongsan, South Korea
- Hangzhou, China
- Hongcheon, South Korea
- Icheon, South Korea
- Jinan, South Korea
- Kent, United States
- Lobo, Philippines
- Musashino, Japan
- Qinhuangdao, China
- Segovia, Spain
- Songino Khairkhan, Mongolia
- Tangshan, China
- Wando, South Korea
- Yeongyang, South Korea
- Willoughby (City), Australia

== See also ==
- Geography of South Korea
