= Cheonho station =

Metro station in Seoul, South Korea

천호 (풍납토성); Cheonho (Pungnaptoseong)
천호 (풍납토성); Cheonho (Pungnaptoseong)
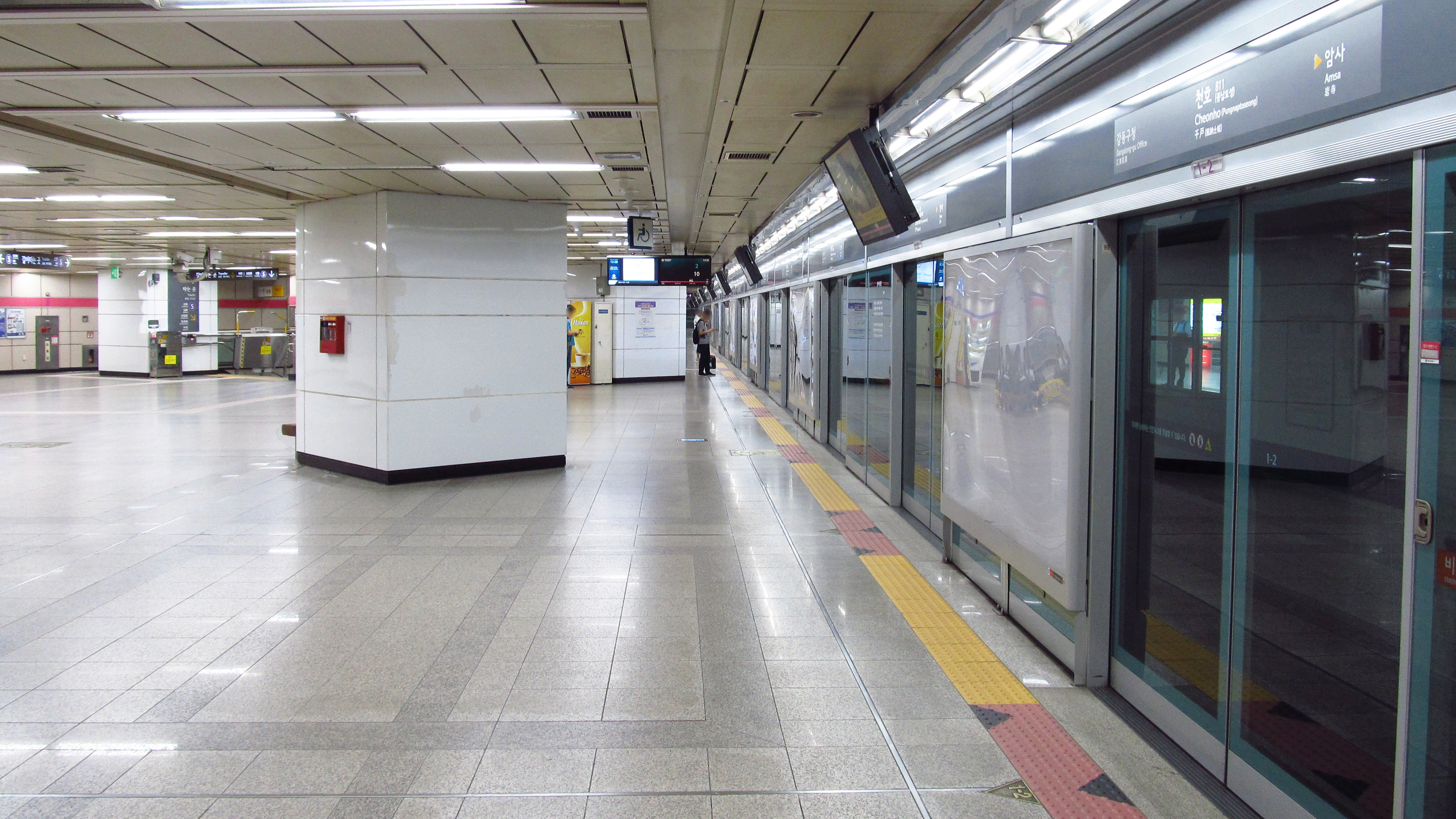
- Station Platform (Line 8)

Korean name
- Hangul: 천호역
- Hanja: 千戶驛
- Revised Romanization: Cheonho-yeok
- McCune–Reischauer: Ch'ŏnho-yŏk

General information
- Location: 997 Cheonhodaero Jiha, 62-1 Seongnae-dong, Gangdong-gu, Seoul
- Coordinates: 37°32′18.66″N 127°7′25.56″E
- Operator: Seoul Metro
- Lines: Line 5 Line 8
- Platforms: 4
- Tracks: 4

Construction
- Structure type: Underground

Key dates
- November 15, 1995: Line 5 opened
- July 2, 1999: Line 8 opened

Services
Preceding station	Seoul Metropolitan Subway	Following station
Gwangnaru towards Banghwa	Line 5	Gangdong towards Hanam Geomdansan or Macheon
Amsa towards Byeollae	Line 8	Gangdong-gu Office towards Moran
Location

Cheonho station is a subway station on the Seoul Subway Line 5 and Line 8. Its station subname is Pungnaptoseong, referring to the Pungnaptoseong that runs between this station and the southeastern end of the Olympic Bridge.

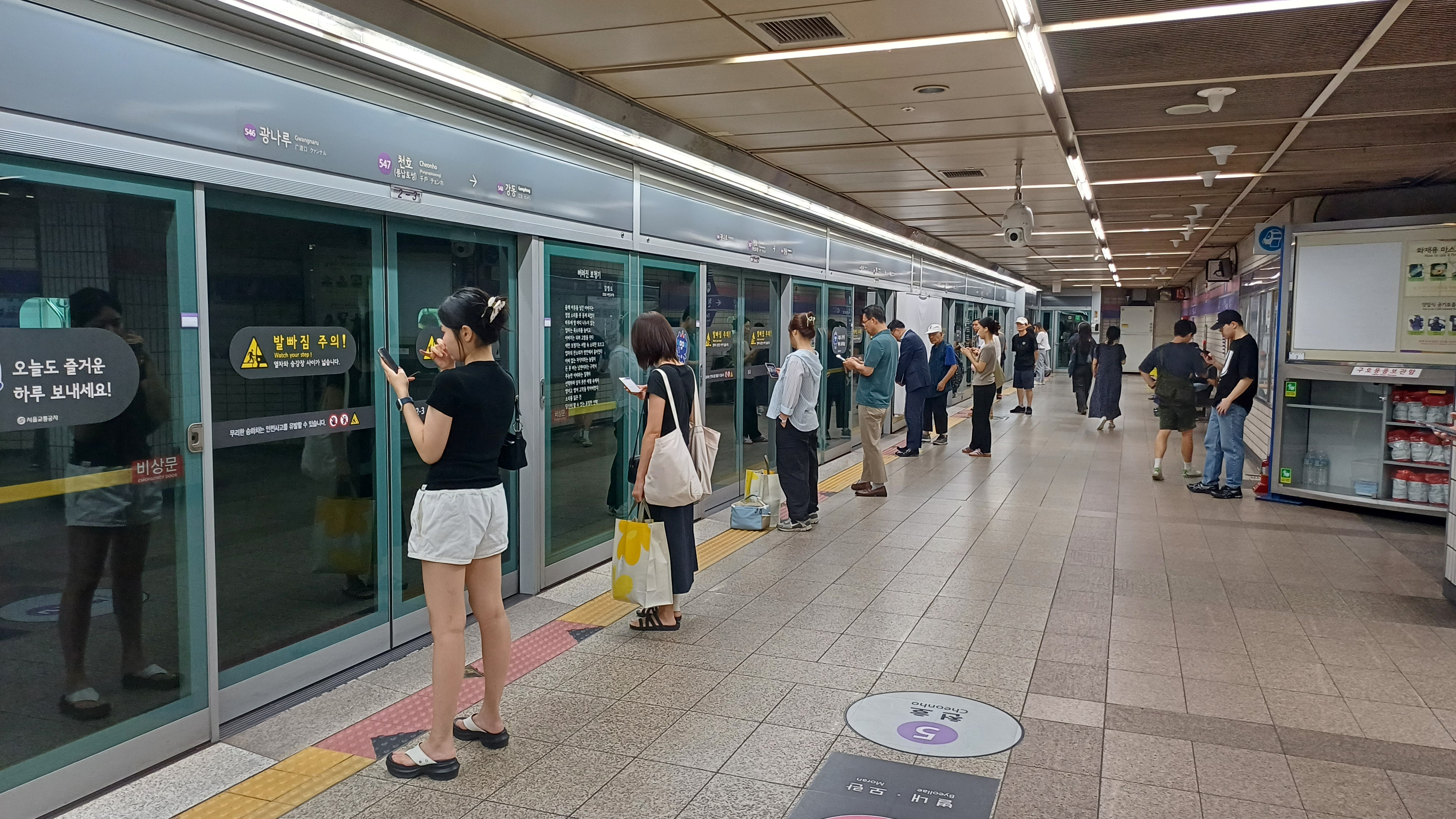
Station platform (Line 5)

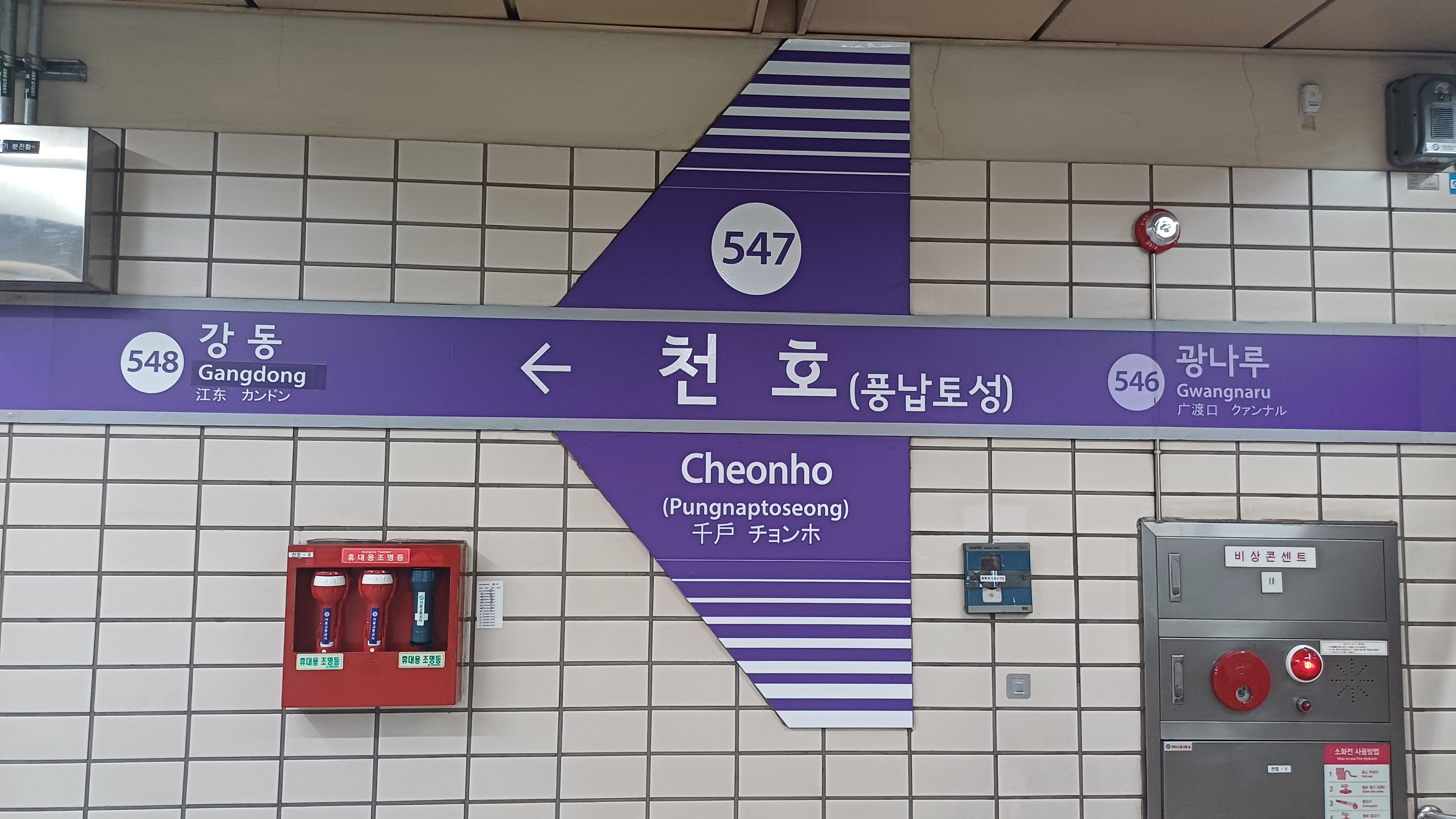
Line 5 station nameplate

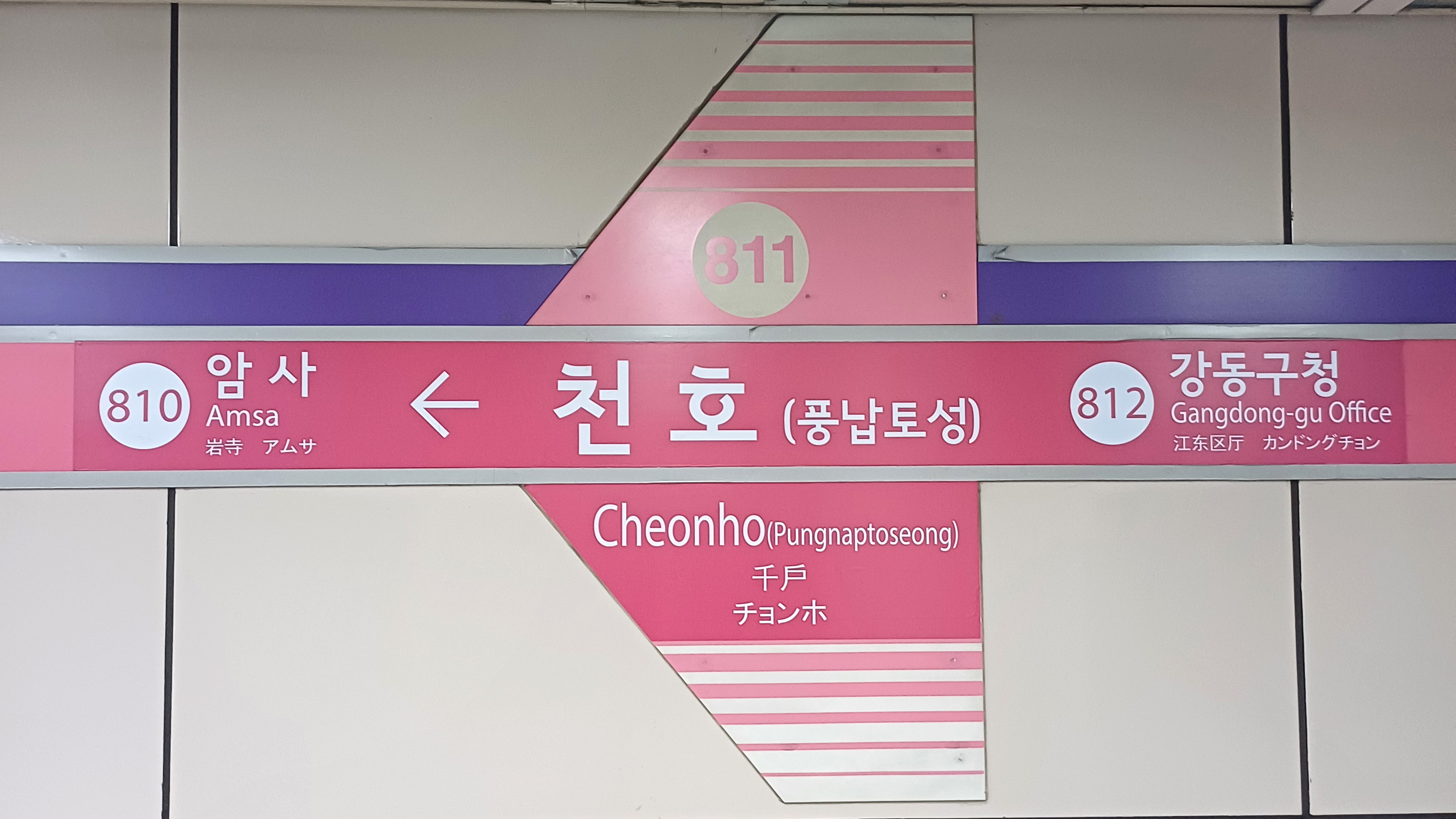
Line 8 station nameplate

== Station layout ==
=== Line 5 ===
Gwangnaru ↑
S/B | | N/B
↓ Gangdong

Northbound	← ● Line 5 toward Banghwa
Southbound	● Line 5 toward Hanam Geomdansan or Macheon →

=== Line 8 ===
Amsa ↑
S/B | | N/B
↓ Gangdong-gu Office

Northbound	← ● Line 8 toward Byeollae
Southbound	● Line 8 toward Moran →
