= Cheonho-dong =

Neighborhood in Seoul, South Korea

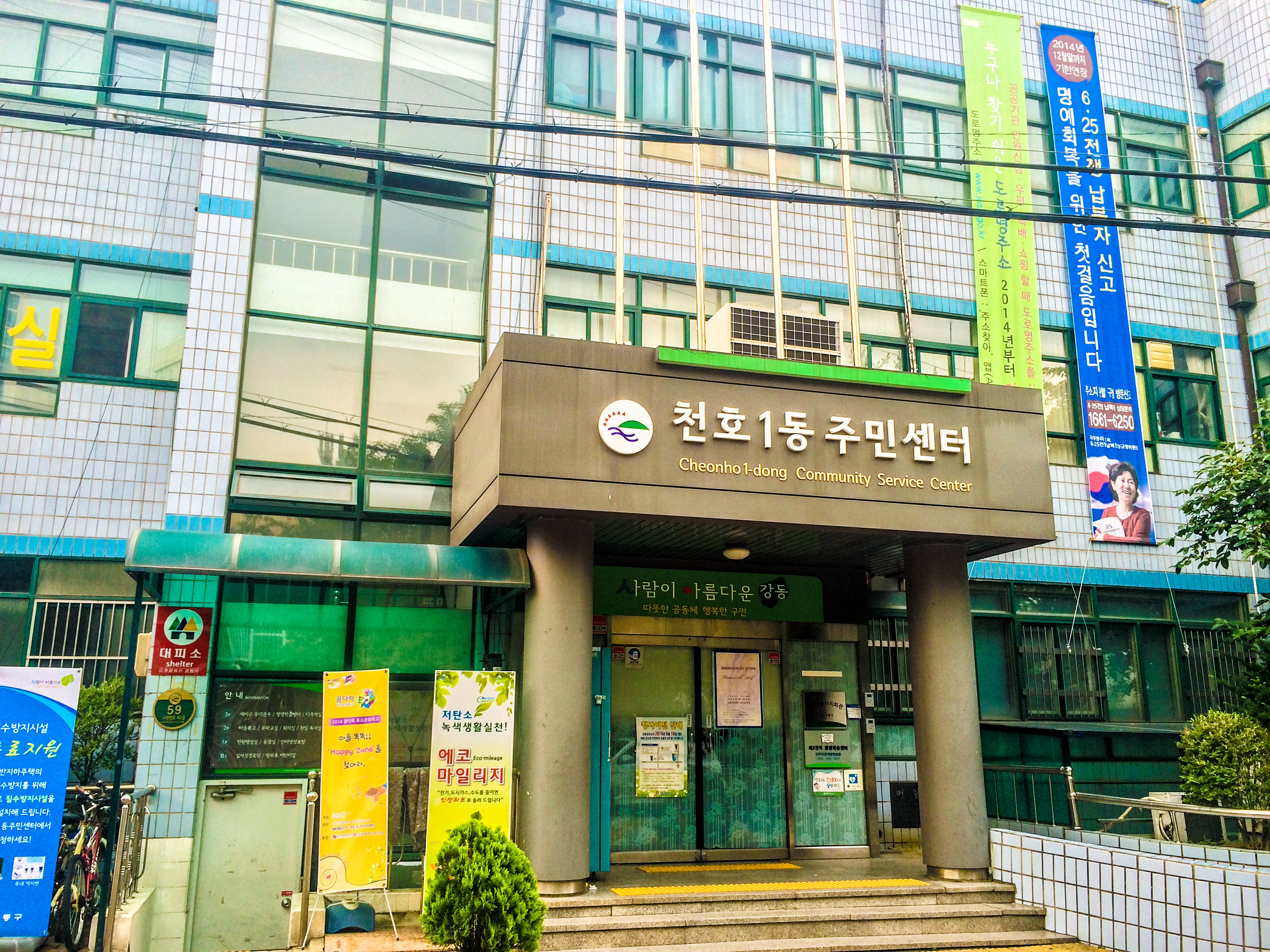
- Cheonho 1(il)-dong Community Service Center (Gangdong District)
- Interactive map of Cheonho-dong
- Coordinates: 37.544°N 127.128°E
- Country: South Korea

Area
  - Total: 3.07 km^{2} (1.19 sq mi)

Population (2001)
  - Total: 106,782
  - Density: 34,782/km^{2} (90,080/sq mi)

Korean name
- Hangul: 천호동
- Hanja: 千戶洞
- RR: Cheonho-dong
- MR: Ch'ŏnho-dong

Cheonho-dong (Korean: 천호동) is a dong (neighborhood) of Gangdong District, Seoul, South Korea.

== History ==
Cheonho means "Thousand of Houses", because its geographical location was believed to be an ideal place to live based on the Feng shui theory. In addition, there is a historical site of Pungnaptoseong, which is a flat earthen wall built at the edge of the Han River in the Baekje Era.

== Overview ==
Cheonho station is a transfer point between Seoul Subway Line 5 and Line 8. Cheonho-dong is a 60-minute Limousine bus ride away from Incheon International Airport.

Current Zip Code of Cheonho-dong is 134-020. 134 is for Gangdong District and 020 is for Cheonho-dong.

== Red-light district ==
Although prostitution is illegal in Korea, there is a long-established red-light district in Cheonho, known as "Texas Village". Since the introduction of the law banning prostitution in 2004 the number of brothels has declined. In December 2018, it was reported that there were still dozens of brothels in the area, and that an accidental fire in one had killed two women.

== See also ==
- Administrative divisions of Seoul
- Administrative divisions of South Korea
