= Jin Sun-mee =

South Korean politician

- 진선미
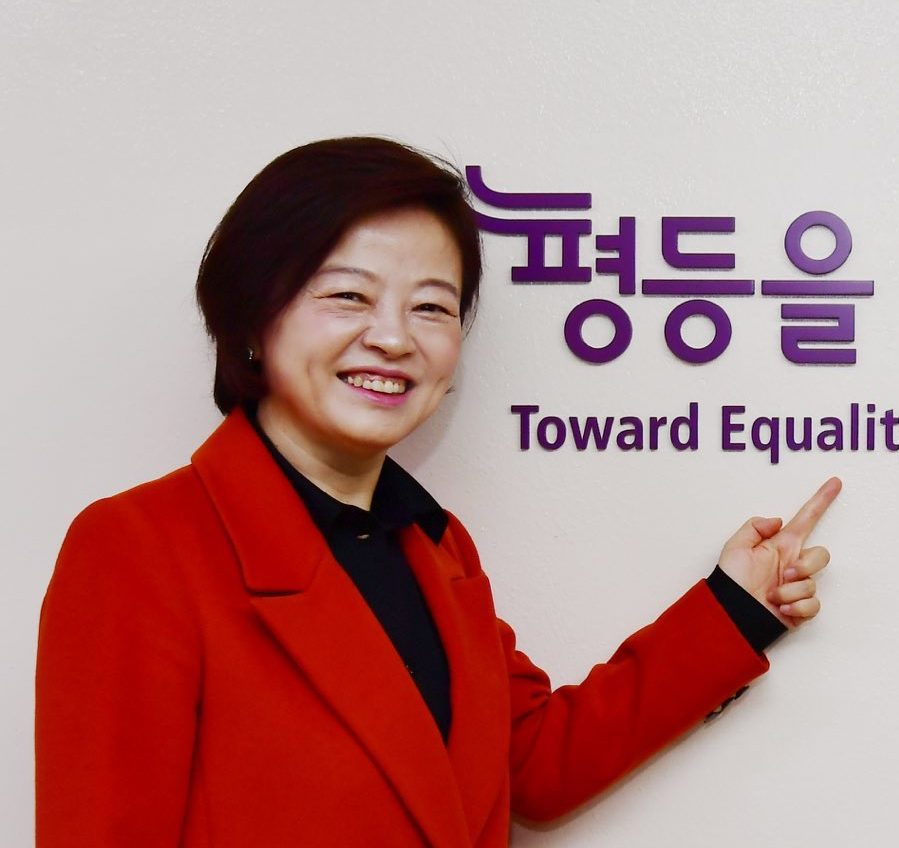

Minister of Gender Equality and Family
- In office 21 September 2018 – 8 September 2019
- President: Moon Jae-in
- Prime Minister: Lee Nak-yeon
- Preceded by: Chung Hyun-back
- Succeeded by: Lee Jung-ok

Member of the National Assembly
- Incumbent
- Assumed office 30 May 2016
- Preceded by: Shin Dong-woo
- Constituency: Seoul Gangdong A
- In office 30 May 2012 – 29 May 2016
- Constituency: Proportional representation

Personal details
- Born: 14 May 1967 (age 59) Sunchang County, South Korea
- Party: Democratic
- Education: Sungkyunkwan University (LLB)

Korean name
- Hangul: 진선미
- Hanja: 陳善美
- RR: Jin Seonmi
- MR: Chin Sŏnmi

Jin Sun-mee (Korean: 진선미; born 14 May 1967) is a South Korean politician previously served as the Minister of Gender Equality and Family under President Moon Jae-in. She is also a three-term parliamentarian previously via proportional representation and now representing the district that was dictated by male politicians and opposition parties.

Before entering politics she worked for the rights of the marginalised people as an attorney at law. She was one of lawyers leading the case for the repeal of the patriarchal Hoju (family head) system.

After becoming a member of the National Assembly, one of her main legislative agendas was on reforming law enforcement agencies and national intelligence service - preventing them from violating civil rights of citizens. She was a spokesperson of the first presidential campaign of current President Moon Jae-in in 2012. She became widely known when she filibustered for nine hours against controversial anti-terror bill in February 2016. Before appointed to the minister, she was the first female senior deputy floor leader of a ruling party.

In 2020, Jin was elected as the chair of the National Assembly's Land, Infrastructure and Transport Committee, which oversees the Ministry of Land, Infrastructure and Transport, Korail, and related agencies. Appointments to this committee are widely sought after, as its members have significant influence over the allocation of funding for local social overhead capital (SOC) projects. In November 2020, Jin was appointed to lead her party's task force reviewing housing policies, including a proposal to establish a new ministry dedicated to public housing.

== Electoral history ==
Election	Year	District	Party affiliation	Votes	Percentage of votes	Results
19th National Assembly General Election	2012	Proportional Representation (5th)	Democratic United Party	7,777,123	36.45%	Elected
20th National Assembly General Election	2016	Seoul Gangdong A	Democratic Party	54,159	44.79%	Won
21st National Assembly General Election	2020	Seoul Gangdong A	Democratic Party	80,361	51.50%	Won
22nd National Assembly General Election	2024	Seoul Gangdong A	Democratic Party	73,791	50.12%	Won

== Personal life ==
She completed primary and secondary education in her hometown of Sunchang County, North Jeolla Province, South Korea. She is the most heavily indebted member of the Cabinet and her party due to her husband's debt.
