= Side platform =

Railway platform with tracks along only one edge

Side platforms with a pedestrian bridge between them

A side platform (also known as a marginal platform or a single-face platform) is a platform positioned to the side of one or more railway tracks or guideways at a railway station, tram stop, transitway, or rapid transit. A station having dual side platforms, one for each direction of travel, is the basic design used for double-track railway lines (as opposed to, for instance, the island platform where a single platform lies between the tracks). Side platforms may result in a wider overall footprint for the station compared with an island platform, where a single width of platform can be shared by riders using either track.

In some stations, the two side platforms are connected by a footbridge or tunnel to allow safe access to the alternate platform. While a pair of side platforms is often provided on a dual-track line, a single side platform is usually sufficient (trains are usually only boarded from one side) for a single-track line.

== Layout ==
Where the station is close to a level crossing (grade crossing) the platforms may either be on the same side of the crossing road or alternatively may be staggered in one of two ways. With the 'near-side platforms' configuration, each platform appears before the intersection and with 'far-side platforms' they are positioned after the intersection.

In some situations, a single side platform can be served by multiple vehicles simultaneously with a scissors crossing provided to allow access mid-way along its length.

Larger stations may have two side platforms with several island platforms in between. Some are in a Spanish solution format, with two side platforms and an island platform in between, serving two tracks.

In some situations, a single side platform may be in use with the other one (side platform) disused like with Ryde Esplanade.

== Examples ==
=== Asia ===
==== Japan ====
Side platforms are common in Japan. They are usually used on single-track railways.

In the Keihanshin region, this configuration is used in some stations on the Kobe Subway Seishin-Yamate Line, the Kyoto Subway Karasuma Line, the Nankai Electric Railway, the Osaka Loop Line and the Osaka Metro Midōsuji Line.

In Nagoya, the Nagoya Municipal Subway built most of its stations with the side platform configuration, including stations on the Meijō Line and the Tsurumai Line.

In Tokyo, they are utilized in some railway stations, such as Nishi-magome, Takarachō, Nihombashi, Asakusabashi and Asakusa.

==== Singapore ====
Although most stations in Singapore use the island platform configuration, the side platform configuration is used in Dover, Canberra, Braddell, Downtown, Telok Ayer, Chinatown, MacPherson and Tanjong Rhu MRT stations. It is also used in all Bukit Panjang LRT stations except for Choa Chu Kang which utilizes the Spanish solution, as well as Fernvale LRT station.

==== South Korea ====
In the metropolitan area, the side platform configuration is used in stations such as Sang-dong, Gangdong, Samdong, Chang-dong, Gil-dong, Cheonho and Sinjung-dong.

== Gallery ==
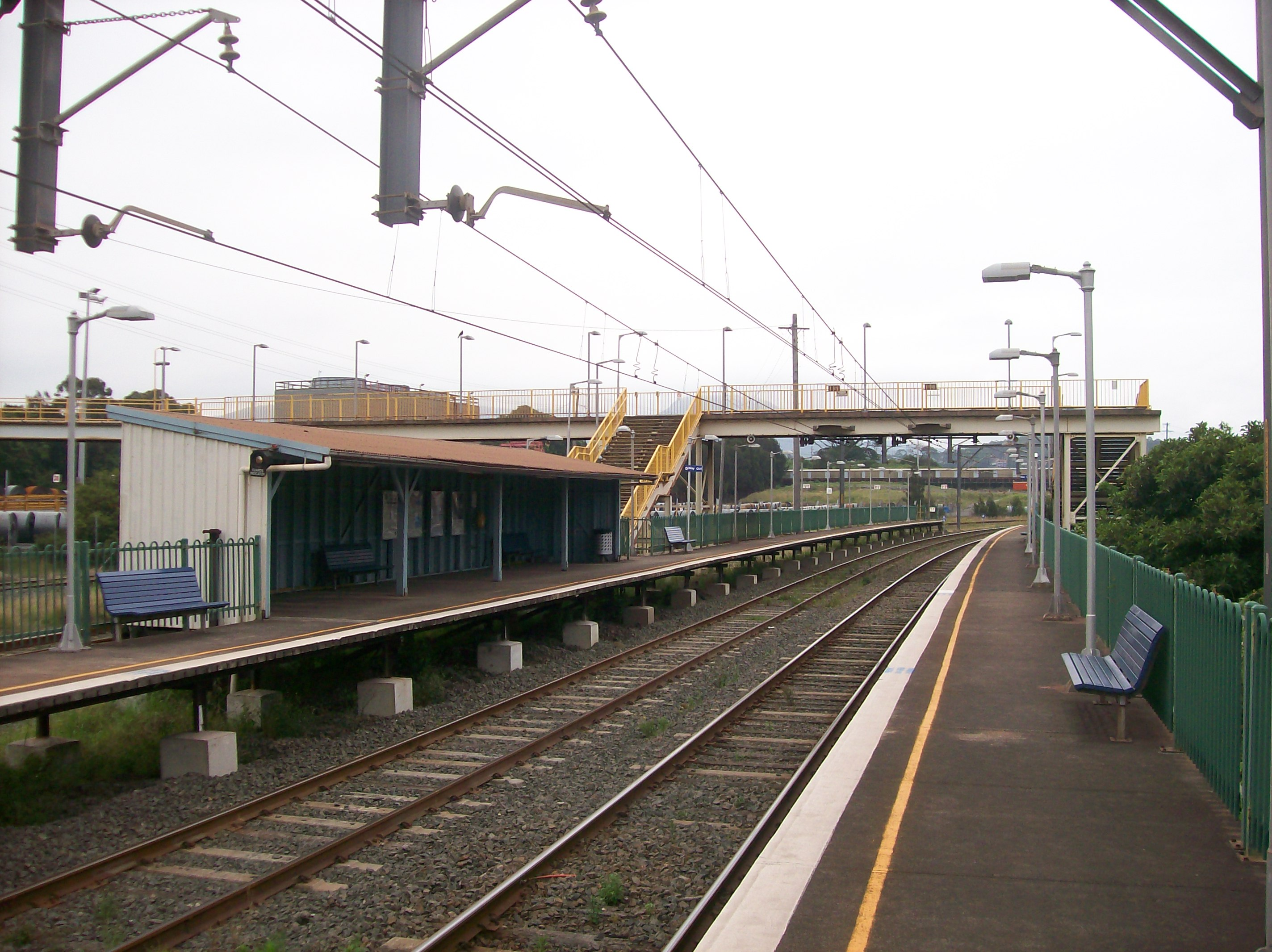
Lysaghts railway station, in Australia, with two side platforms and a footbridge connecting them

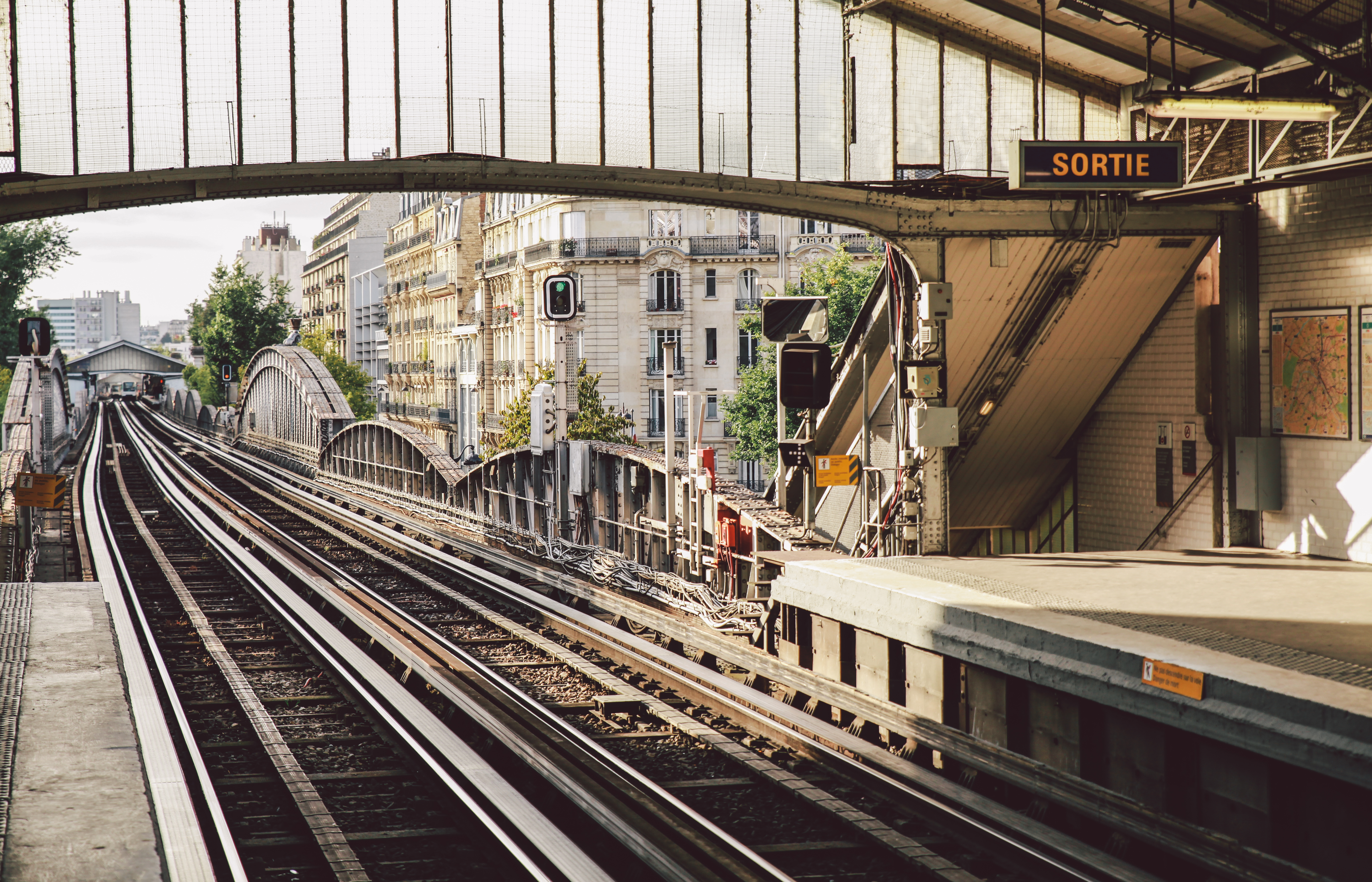
Cambronne station on Line 6 of the Paris Métro. An example of an elevated station with side platforms.

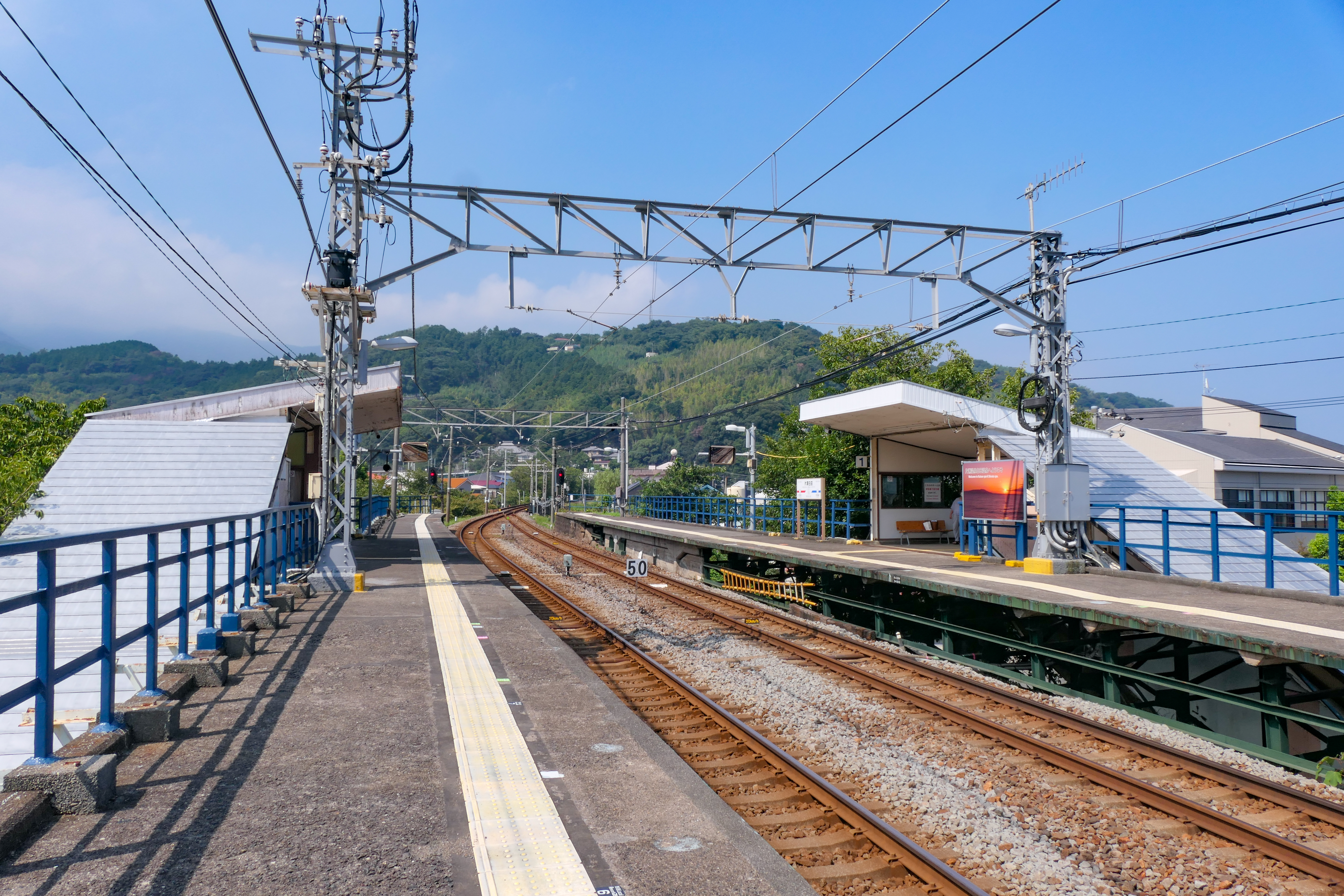
View of Katase-Shirata Station (Japan), an example where the line is mainly a single track, but it is possible for trains to cross each other at the station

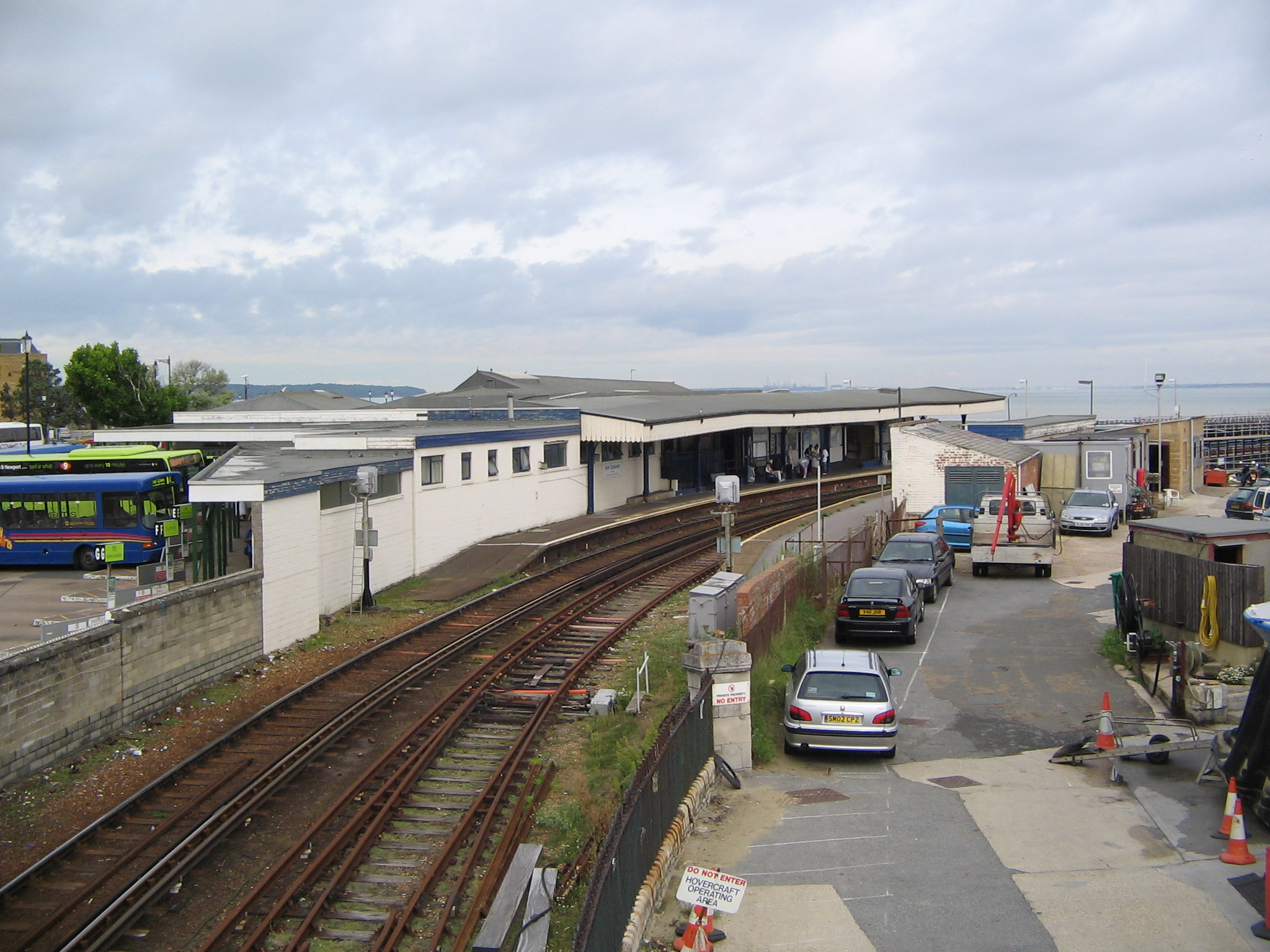
Ryde Esplanade railway station, with one platform in use and another out of use. Ryde, Isle of Wight, Hampshire, England.

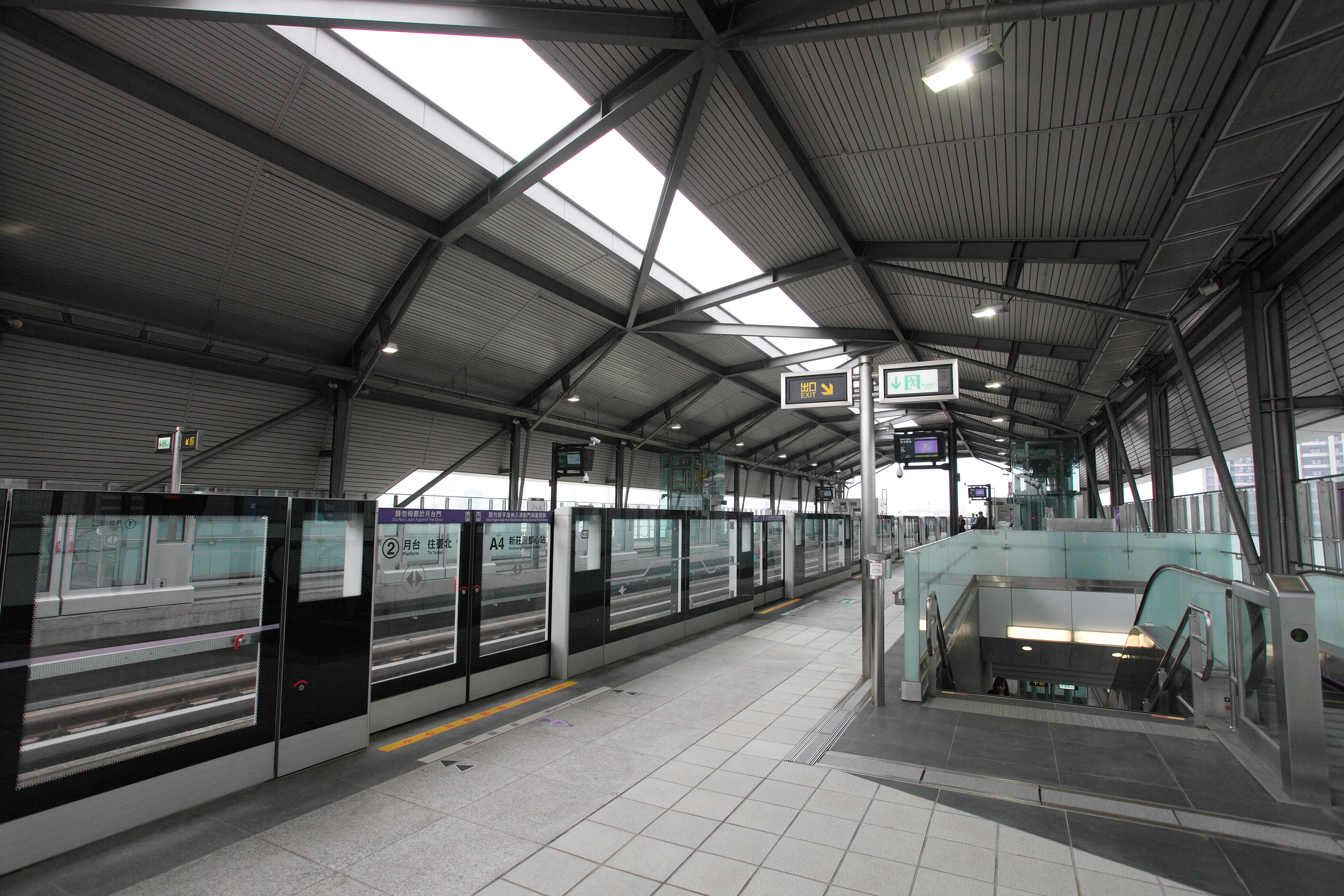
Xinzhuang Fuduxin metro station on the Taoyuan Airport MRT (Taiwan). Many stations on the Taoyuan Airport MRT use side platforms rather than an island platform to better accommodate large numbers of passengers.

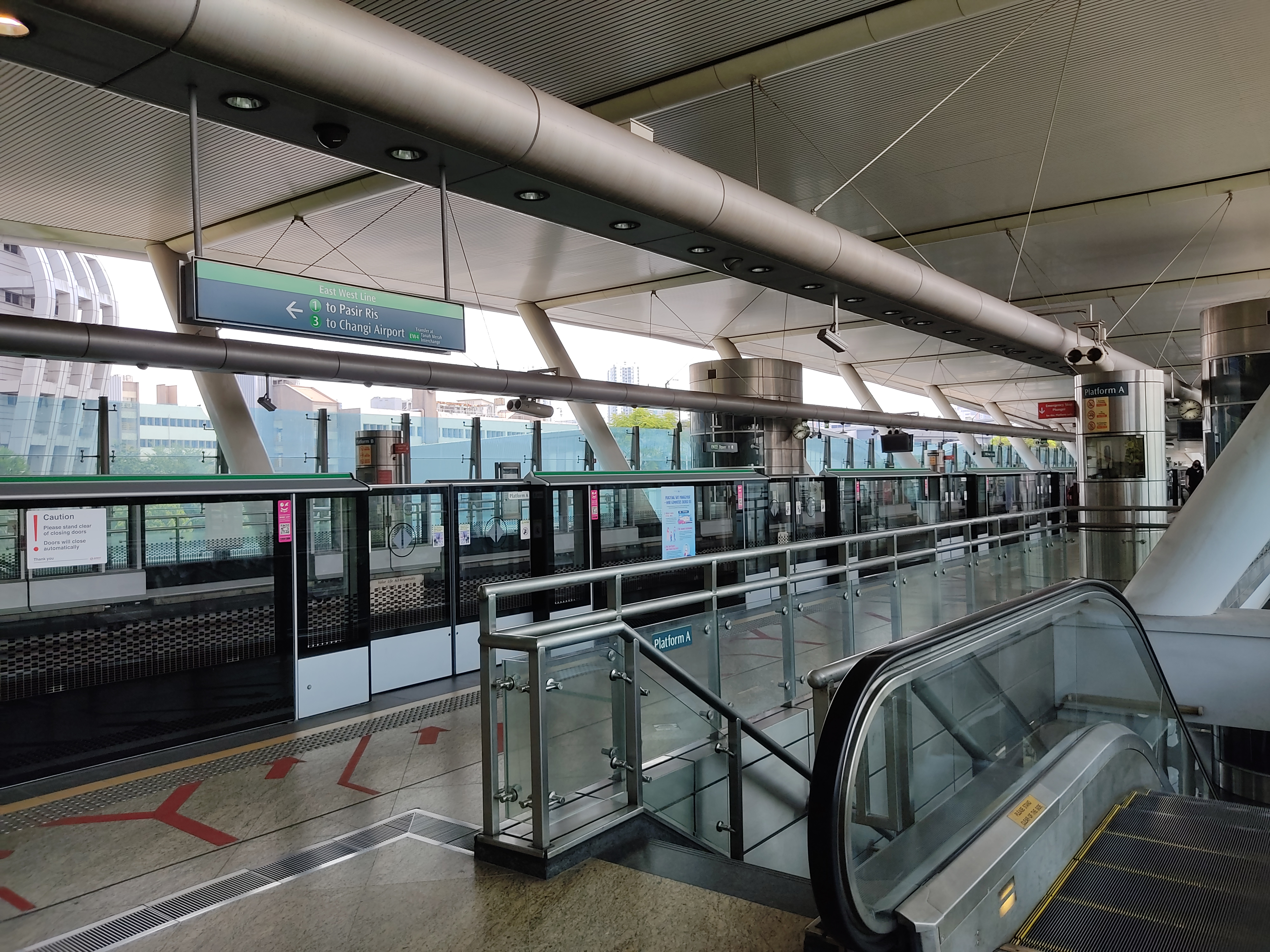
Dover MRT station (Singapore) with two platforms in use. The station is an infill station built along an existing line; thus, it takes a side platform structure.

== See also ==
- Island platform
- Split platform
