= Olympic Bridge =

Bridge in Seoul, South Korea

Coordinates: 37.5340°N 127.1039°E

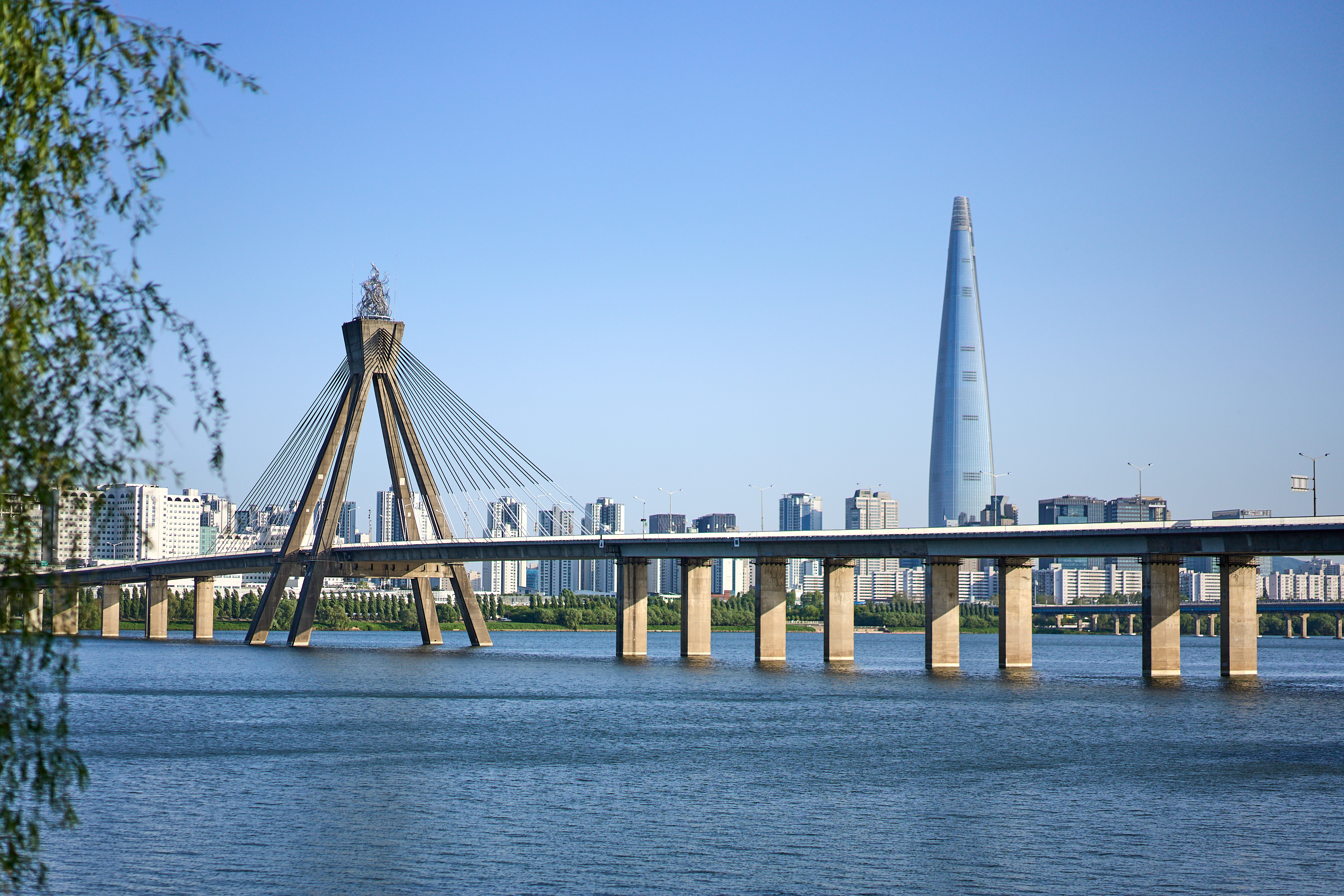

Korean name
- Hangul: 올림픽대교
- Hanja: 올림픽大橋
- RR: Ollimpik daegyo
- MR: Ollimp'ik taegyo

The Olympic Bridge (Korean: 올림픽대교), also known as the Grand Olympic Bridge, is a bridge over the Han River in Seoul, South Korea. The bridge connects the Gwangjin and Songpa districts.

== Construction ==
The bridge was meant to celebrate the 1988 Summer Olympics, which were to be held in Seoul. A design contest for the bridge began in 1984, and the design was selected by April 1985.

Construction on the bridge started in November 1985. It opened on November 15, 1989, after the games; it was delayed as part of the foundation collapsed.

== 2001 military helicopter crash ==
On May 29, 2001, a CH-47D helicopter from ROK Army, attempting to lower a sculpture onto the top of the bridge, crashed and fell into the Han River, killing all three on board.
