= Seongnae-dong =

Neighborhood in South Korea

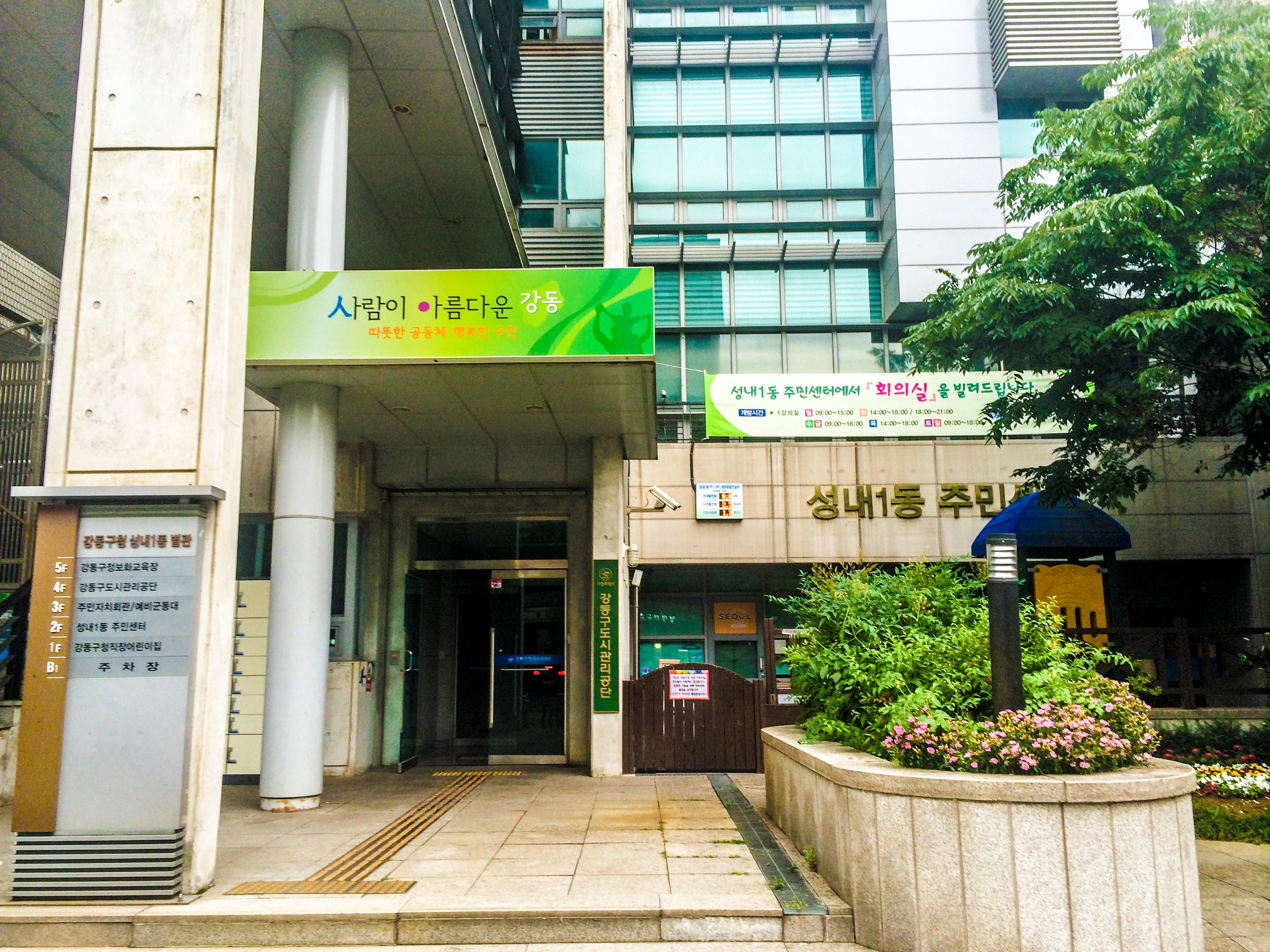
- Community service center in Seongnae-dong, June 2014.
- Country: South Korea

Area
  - Total: 1.96 km^{2} (0.76 sq mi)

Population (2001)
  - Total: 73,173
  - Density: 37,333/km^{2} (96,690/sq mi)

Korean name
- Hangul: 성내동
- Hanja: 城內洞
- RR: Seongnae-dong
- MR: Sŏngnae-dong

Seongnae-dong (Korean: 성내동) is a dong (neighbourhood) of Gangdong District, Seoul, South Korea.

== See also ==
- Administrative divisions of South Korea
