= List of South Korean festivals =

For older or historical observances in Korea see traditional festivals of Korea.

Many new festivals have originated in South Korea in response to the country's tourism initiatives. Contributing to this growth is a gradual change to a five-day work week and greater leisure.

Koreans mostly use the Gregorian calendar, which was officially adopted in 1896. However, traditional holidays are still based on the old calendar.

== Lists of festivals by region ==
=== Seoul ===
Seoul Lantern Festival

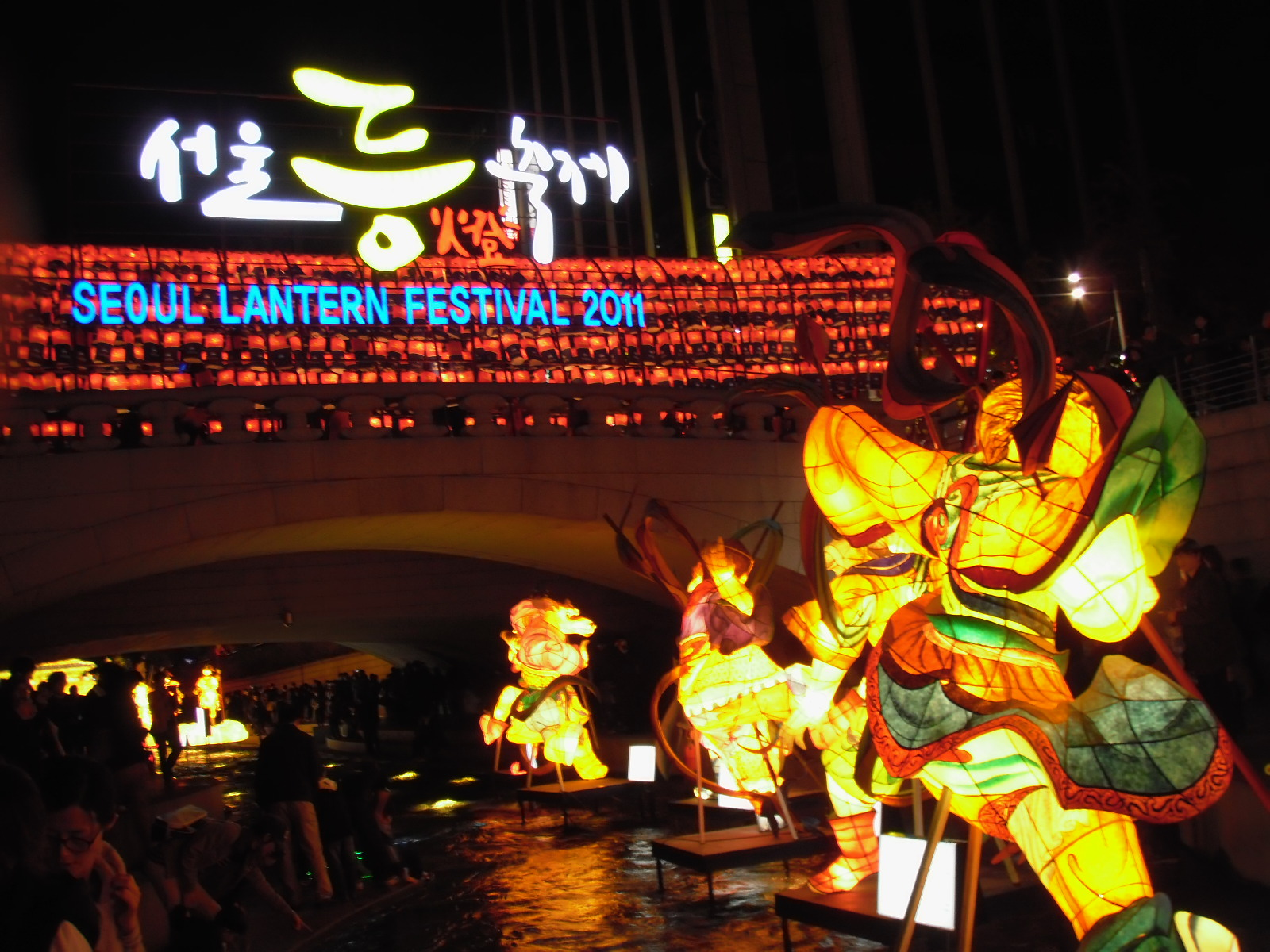
2011 Seoul lantern festival

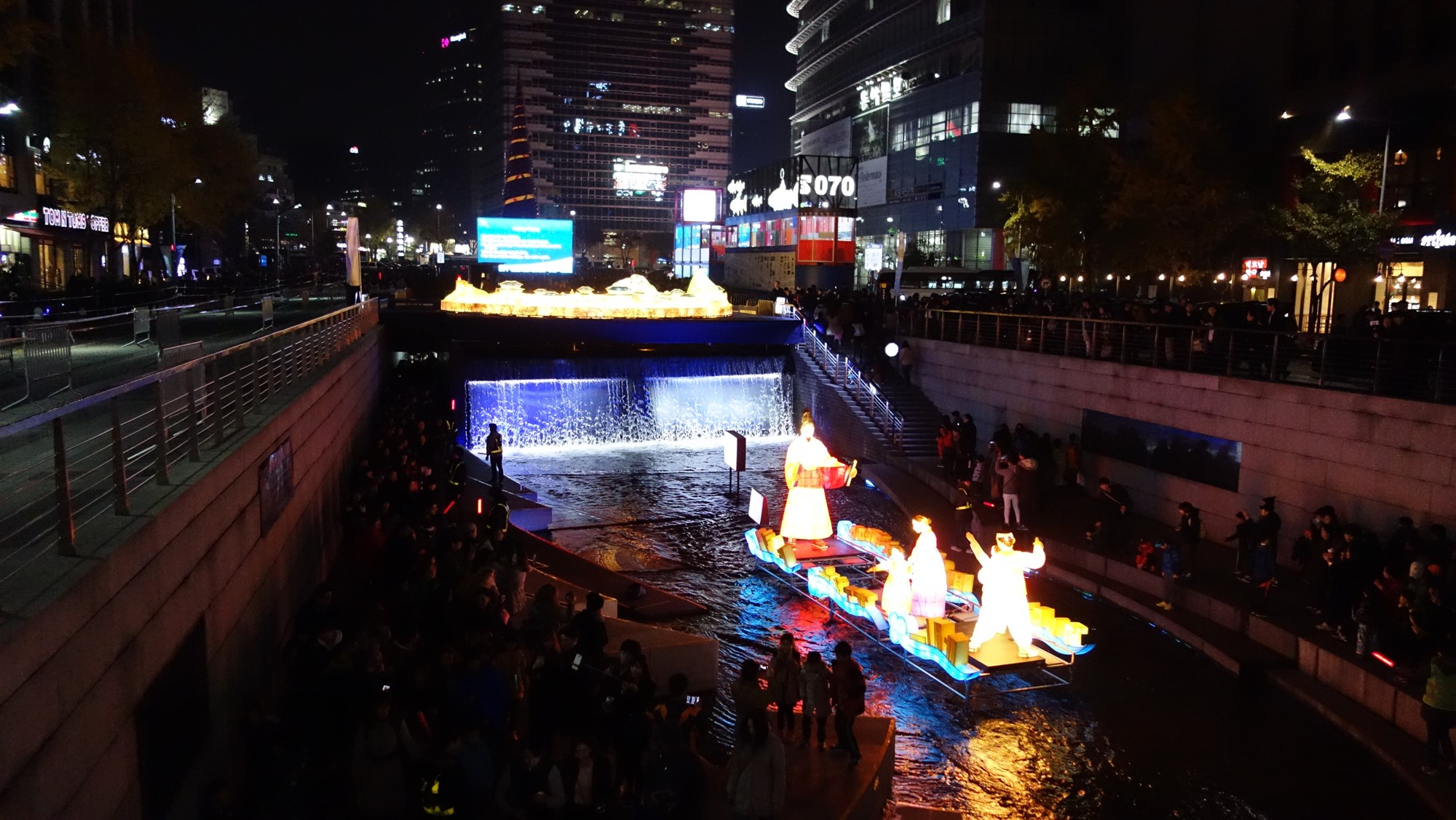
Lantern boats, 2014 festival

- Region: Around Cheonggyecheon, accessible by Seoul Subway Line 1, Jonggak Station, or Seoul Subway Line 2, City Hall Station (Seoul).
- Date (Schedule): From the first week of November to the third week of November, approximately
- History: The festival was held in 2009 for the first time in Seoul along with the restored Cheonggyecheon stream. During 12 days, over 520,000 people visited this festival. The next year, in 2010, the main theme was 'Seoul, Forest of Life for Hope'. Compared to the previous year, the number of visitors quadrupled. Foreign reporters who were visiting Korea for the G20 Seoul Summit reported at the festival. With some success, in 2011 its name was changed from the Seoul World Lantern Festival to the Seoul Lantern Festival and the theme was "Stories of Seoul's Past through Lanterns Plus"; there was again rapid growth, a 24% rise in the number of total visitors. In 2012 "a glimpse into Seoul's roots and the daily life of Korean Ancestors" was the main theme.
- Other similar festivals: Jinju Namgang Yudeung Festival
- Special activities: Visitors can climb up the Seoul City Wall, set afloat lanterns of hope, create traditional lanterns, and can buy traditional Korean paper lanterns with a discount promotion.
- "Outline of the Festival". Archived from the original on March 23, 2013.

Seoul International Fireworks Festival

- Region: Yeouido Han River park. / Subway - Seoul Subway Line 5 Yeouinaru Station exit 1
- Date: October, September (Still unconfirmed)
- History: From 2000 on, this festival has been held annually in Yeouido (except for 2001 due to the 9/11 terror attacks in the United States), 2006 (because of nuclear tests in North Korea), and 2009 (because of concerns about Influenza A virus subtype H1N1). In 2000 this festival was held for the first time with four countries represented: South Korea, the United States, Japan and China, with each team making its own show every Saturday. In 2002 the festival was designated as a formal festival for World Cup, and all five teams attended the festival: Australia, the United States, Japan, China, Italy and South Korea. In 2003's team were South Korea, Australia, Japan and China. In 2004's team were Australia, South Korea, China, and Italy. 2005's team were South Korea, the United States, China, and Italy. In 2007 only three countries, South Korea, the United States, and Japan attended. In 2008 only two countries, South Korea and Hong Kong, took part; however, In 2010 South Korea, Canada, and China attended. In 2011 Portugal joined South Korea and Japan. More recently in 2012 South Korea, Italy, the United States and China attended.
- Other similar festivals: There is another fireworks festival in Haeundae, Busan. Visitors can have a picnic in the park while waiting for the start with family or friends.

Seoul Spring Flower Festival

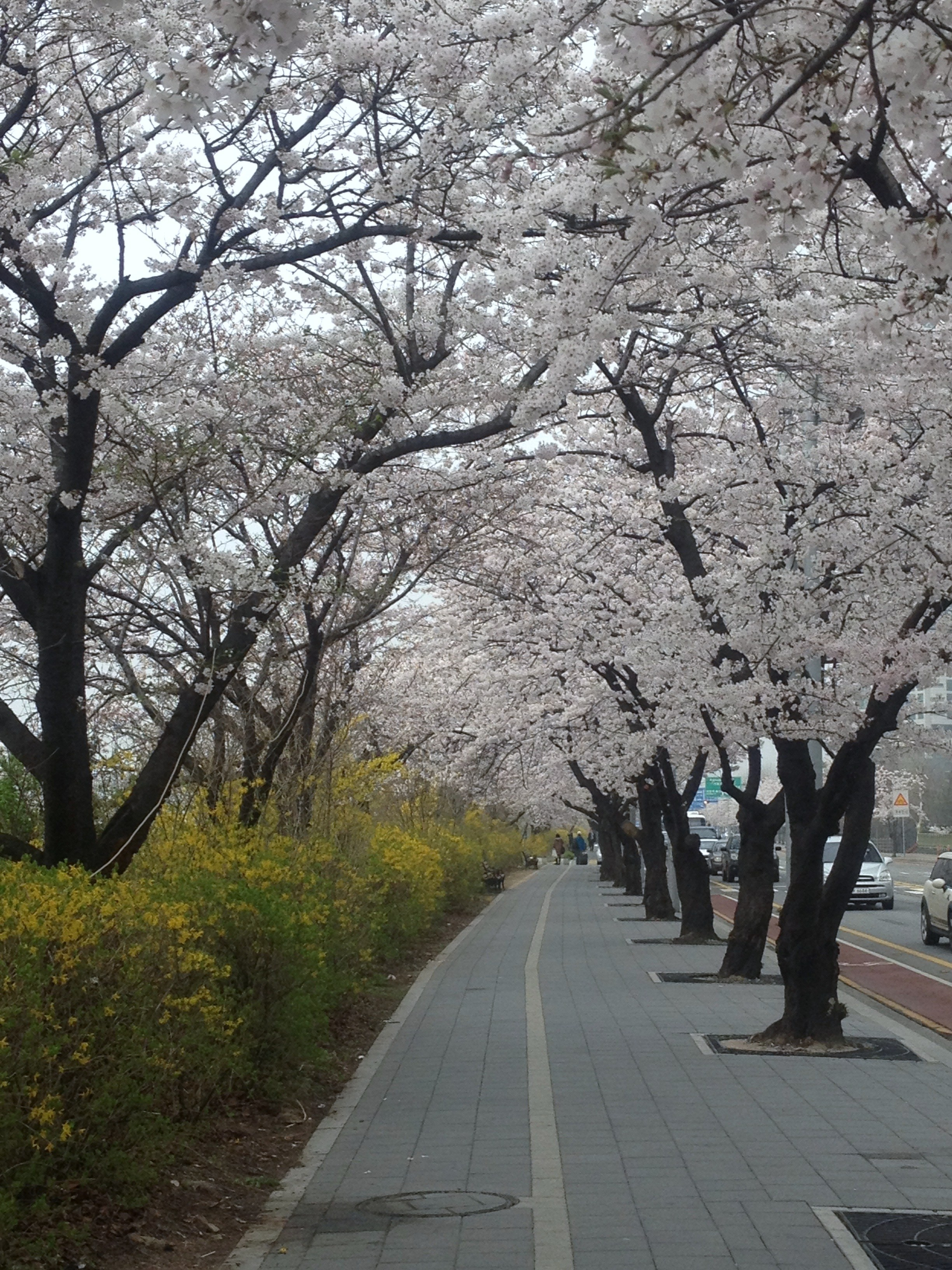
Cherry blossom festival

- Region: Yeouido // Behind the National Assembly, also called Yoonjoong-ro. People can access Seoul Subway Line 5 Yeouinaru Station, Seoul Subway Line 9 National Assembly Station, Seoul Subway Line 2 Dangsan Station.
- Date: Early April depending on the blooming of the cherry blossoms
- History: The festival was first started in 2005, and since then every year from approximately the middle of April to the end this festival is held in Yeouido.
- Other similar festivals: There are many similar festivals in Korea because cherry blossoms were planted in many places in South Korea. The origin of cherry blossoms is contested, with some arguing they originate in Japan, though Koreans claim the local variety is native. The blossom festival at Jinhae Gunhangje is one of the most popular flower festivals in South Korea. The 51st annual festival was held in Jinhae in April 2013.
- Special activities: There are singing contests, photo exhibitions, small band concerts, and so on.
- Official homepage

Seoul Eulalia Festival

- Region: Worldcup Park which is in Mapo District. Worldcup Park was finished in 2002 while Korea readied for the 2002 FIFA World Cup. It was originally a landfill of Seoul but the place was re-purposed as a park and stadium and a variety of trees and plants were planted. The festival can be reached by Seoul Subway Line 6 World Cup Stadium station.
- Date: Every October
- History: The festival has been held since 2002 when the park was made. The park usually prohibits entry after sunset, but during the festival, people can enter until 10 pm.
- Other similar festival: Hwawangsan Eulalia Festival
- Special activities: Walking around the park, small amateur saxophone concerts, and so on.
- "시민이 참여하는 공연" [Performances with citizen participation] (in Korean). Archived from the original on April 29, 2013.

=== Gyeonggi Province ===
Goyang International Flower Festival

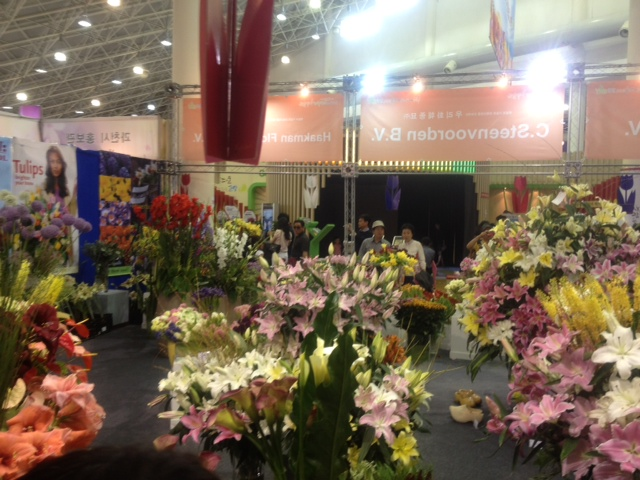
Took from flower festival

- Region / Traffic: ilsan Lake Park / Seoul Subway Line 3 Jeongbalsan station.
- Date (Schedule): Every Spring of 3 years. (It was held between last April 27 and May 12)
- History: This festival has held in 1997. Every 3 years with a different theme, this festival greets their tourists. The first festival was held in 1997 and its theme was 'Flower meeting Human'. Over 20 countries attended this festival. The second festival was held in 2000 and its theme was 'Collaboration between Human and Flower'. All 39 countries attended this festival. The third festival was held in 2003 and its theme was 'Delight Human as Flower'. Two fewer countries attended this festival in contrast with the last festival. The next festival was held in 2006 and its theme was 'One world with Flower'. 27 countries attended at that time but over 100 companies from South Korea attended. The fifth festival was held in 2009. Its theme was 'On-Nuri, Got-Nuri, which meaning 'Whole over the world with flower'. 24 countries attended this festival in 2009. The latest festival was held in 2012, themed with 'World flower parade'. In total, 40 countries attended this festival
- Other similar Festival : Anmyeondo Korea Floritopia.
- Special activities: There is much to do at this festival. Not only look around hundreds of kinds of flowers but also tourists can buy flowers at reasonable prices. Moreover, make one's own vase, make some accessories with flowers such as key rings, notes, etc.
- "Top Stories". Archived from the original on March 9, 2020.

Gyeonggi International Ceramic Biennale

- Region / Traffic: Gyeonggi Icheon / Tourist have to take their car or express bus from Seoul, Address : 389, Gwango-dong, Icheoncity, Gyeonggi Province, South Korea
- Date (Schedule): It will be held in 2014 from 28 September to 17 November (during 51 days).
- History: This festival has lasted 27 years with various "Yo-Jang", which is named for a ceramic factory. This city was designated by UNESCO as one of the creative cities in the world in 2010. For over 20 years, this festival became one of the famous festivals in Korea. From Bronze Age, Icheon was a village where people make variety kinds of ceramics. For this reason, this city dwellers have made ceramics for a long time naturally.
- Other similar festival: Gwangju Ceramic for king festival.
- Special activities: Kids can make their own ceramic with a master of ceramic making and they also are able to play with soil for ceramic. Plus, tourists can buy some ceramics for kitchen dishes, lay-out, exhibitions, and other purposes.
- "Welcome to Icheon Seolbong Park". Archived from the original on September 28, 2014.

Jarasum International Jazz Festival

- Region / Traffic:
- Date (Schedule):
- History:
- Other similar festival:
- Special activities:
- Official Homepage:

=== South Chungcheong Province ===
The Great Admiral Yisunsin Festival

- Region / Traffic: Around Onyang hot spring spare and downtown / Subway - Seoul Subway Line 1 Onyang hot spring Station
- Date (Schedule): 4/26~4/28
- History: This is the Asian cultural tourism festival. This festival is held to celebrate Yisunsin's great achievement of overcoming the national crisis. This event is held every year before or after his birthday to imbue the mind with patriotic spirit.
- Other similar festival: Celebrating the Birth of Great Admiral Yi Sun-shin Festival
- Special activities: There is a celebration concert, parade, the military service examination revival performance, and so on.
- Official Homepage

Buyeo Seodong Lotus Festival

- Region / Traffic: Around Buyeo-gun Seodong park
- Date (Schedule): 7/18~7/21
- History: Buyeo is the final capital of Baekje. In Buyeo, lotus flowers in July. Lotus Festival is held to pay tribute to the love of good Seon Wha Princess Youth and Seo Dong at a later date became King Mu. Sendong Park is the place of the festival. The festival's landscape (flowers of various lotus) has a stark, unworldly beauty. Traces of the past are left in the place name which is called "Marae embankment". So, It cast people's minds back Seodong who sold 'Ma'.
- Other similar festival: Muan Lutus Festival, Iksan Seodong Festival
- Special activities: There is a painting festival of large flowers and sketching competitions. In addition, this event tried to recapture the ceremonial walk of the king. There are traditional music performances and a gala concert of the musical Seodongyo
- Official Homepage

Boryeong Mud festival

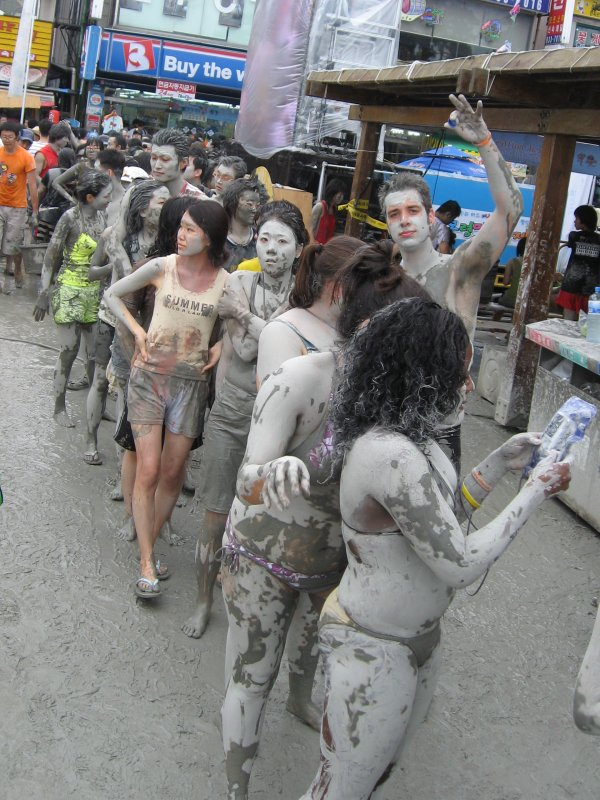
Korea-Boryeong Mud Festival-02

- Region / Traffic: Around Daechon beach in Boryong, Chungchongnam-do
- Date (Schedule): 7/19~7/28
- History: Boryeong Mud Festival was held for the first time in 1998 when mud cosmetics development in 1996. Boryeong mud has become more famous for the Boryeong Mud Festival and domestic production of mud raw material.
- Other similar festival: Nonpul Mud Festival
- Special activities: The festival is divided into the opening ceremony, planning events (mud, mud cosmetics), and experience event. Experience event is the most primary concern. There are mud games, obstacle races, and so on.
- Official Homepage

=== North Chungcheong Province ===
Cheongpungho Cherry Blossoms Festival

- Region / Traffic: Around Cheongpungho, Jecheon, Chungbuk
- Date (Schedule): 4/19~4/21
- History: This is a historied festival which started 17 years ago. In 2008, Jecheon city was changed this festival's name 'to Chonpunho Cherry Blossom Festival' for the dissemination of the 'Chonpunho name restoration campaign'.
- Other similar Festival: Yeouido Spring Flower Festival
- Special activities: During the festival, traditional markets are held. There is a local cuisine. Also, agricultural special product exhibition and sale events are held. It is possible that there is an early performance event, experience events, the exhibition event, and also experience events performances of the Chinese arts team, and dance parade in the world.
- Official Homepage

Sobaek Mountain Loyal Azalea Festival

- Region / Traffic: Around Sobaek Mountain, Namhan riverside
- Date (Schedule): 5/29~6/2
- History: This festival was started in 1983 In order to heal the sick mind of residents by Chungju dam construction and for Danyang's prosperity as loyal azalea. One year, two years after, Sobaek Mountain Loyal Azalea Festival, has solidified the facts can hold a festival of longer, various events and more period.
- Other similar festival: Gunpo Loyal Azalea Festival, Hwangmae Mountain Loyal Azalea Festival
- Special activities: there are a riverside concert, musical, circus, and hiking. Stars can be observed, and there is a beauty contest.
- Official Homepage

=== Gangwon Province ===
==== Hwacheon Sancheoneo Ice Festival ====
- Region / Traffic: Hwacheoncheon site at Hwacheon-up, Hwacheon-gun, Gangwon-do, and other 5 up and myeon
- Date (Schedule): January 5 (Saturday) 2012 ~ January 27 (Sunday) (23days)
- History: Hwacheon Sancheoneo Ice Festival is opened in every January under the slogan of “Unfrozen Hearts, Unforgettable Memories” at Hwacheon that has the geographical feature of the fastest ice freezing in the country because of cold valley wind and clean water.
- Another similar festival: Jiokbae Water Festival
- Special Activities:
  - Sancheoneo Experience Program
  - Snow and Ice Experience Program
  - Culture and Event Program
- Official Homepage

==== Jokbae Festival ====
- Region / Traffic: Bungoseom island and 5 Villages in Hwacheon-gun, Gangwon-do
- Date (Schedule): July 28(Sat) ~ August 12(Sun), 2011
- History : There was a ferry called Namgang-Naru, a shipping route for salts between Incheon and Hwacheon during Koryo Dynasty (918~1392), although water routes are not available due to dams. Nobody remembers the ferry and the boats in Hwacheon at past any more. Jjokbae Water Festival has started to reproduce the images of boats used in shipping salts at past since 2003. The festivity is last between end of July to early August every year with various programs such as Creative Jjokbae Building Contest, Valley hiking, Farm-stay for families and about 30 different programs.
- Other similar festival: Hwacheon Sancheoneo Ice Festival
- Special activities:
  - Water-related programs
  - Creative Jjokbae Building Contest
  - Camping for campers
  - Valley hiking
  - Farm-stay for families.
  - Creative Jjokbae Building Contest
- Official Homepage

=== South Gyeongsang Province ===
- Jinju Namgang Yudeung Festival
- Region / Traffic : Around Namgang, Jinju-si
- Date (Schedule): 10/1~10/13
- History: In October, 1592, when General Kim Simin with his 3800 men killed 20,000 Japanese troops, heightening national pride, the lanterns were used not only as military signals but also communicative methods between soldiers and their families. In the second attack in June, 1593, 70000 citizens, officials and soldiers were killed, and after it, they began to float the lanterns of the river during Gaecheon Art Festival as a service for repose of the deceased and peace and prosperity of homes and nation. Reflecting the long history of Jinju, Jinju Namgang Yudeung Festival has settled as the symbol of royalty and wishing.
- Other similar festival: Seoul Lotus lantern Festival
- Special activities: This festival consist of many events. Attendees can hang wishing lanterns, and float lanterns on the river. This festival exhibits traditional folk crafts and creative lanterns. Also, attendees can board a pleasure ship, see fireworks on river, experience Jinju tradition food, and more.
- Official Homepage
- Jinhae Gunhang Festival
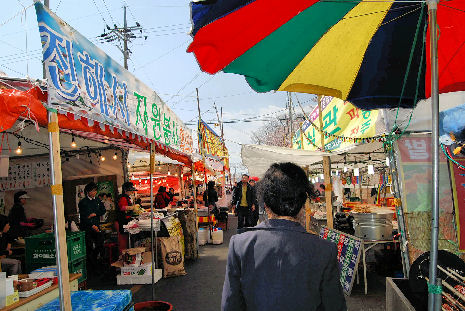
  Jinhae International Military Band Festival 2007-03
- Region / Traffic: Around Jungwon rotary, Jinhae-gu area
- Date (Schedule): 4/1~4/10
- History: Changwon-si has held this festival from 1963. The name is derived from 1952, it holds a memorial service stand to Bokwonro Rotary statue of Chungmugong Admiral Yi Sun-sin, and Naval Port Festival is compound word of the harbor and the naval base, but this festival's main attraction is cherry blossoms. In early spring, Jinhae is surrounded by cherry blossom flowers.
- Other similar festival: Gyeongju Cherry Blossoms Festival
- Special activities: This festival held in many areas. In Jungwon Rotary, there is the fringe performance, pop festival. In Jinhae Public Stadium, there is a Military Band & Guard of Honor Festival. In Jinhae Civil Center, there are some Member Exhibitions, Competitions. And there are competitions, public opening of military bases, guerilla performances.
- Official Homepage

Hadong Wild Tea Cultural Festival

- Region / Traffic: Around Hwagae-myeon, Akyang-myeon, Hadong-gun
- Date (Schedule) : 5/17~5/19
- History: Hadong is Korea's leading producer of green tea. Hadong Wild Tea came from China to Silla in 828 A.D. Over a few hundred years, Hadong wild tea was praised for this excellence. This place can produce high quality Hadong green tea because it has many gravels, a good waterway, fertile land, a high mountain, deep valleys, many large and small rivers including Sumjin River, large difference temperature during harvestion time, and much fog. All these reasons add up to make the best quality.
- Other similar festival: Bosung Green Tea Festival
- Special activities: This festival consists of three major events (Sumjin River Moonlight Tea Event, Korea Tea Lover Festival, and Boeun tea meeting). It holds many experiences, for example, making coffee, pottery making, foot bath, massage, nail art, and walking tour. Also, it holds some performance events, such as, Green tea show, symposium, and concert. Also, there are some exhibition programs (tea cafe, tea market).
- Official Homepage

=== North Gyeongsang Province ===
Cheongdo Cow Fight Festival

- Region / Traffic: Cheongdo, North Gyeongsang Province
- Date (Schedule): From 17 April to 21 April. (It can be changed every year)
- History: Originally it was started from the 1970s as a traditional play in South Korea. During the '80s and '90s it was held between mania who live in North Gyeongsang Province. Finally in 1999 this festival was held as a large, national festival. From that time this festival was held every single year and many people who live in Korea or stay in Korea took part in this festival.
- Other similar festival: No same theme of this festivals are here. However, Seoul Horse Racing Festival is also great festival with animals.
- Special activities:
- Official Homepage

=== South Jeolla Province ===
Gwangyang International Maehwa Festival

- Region / Traffic: Attendants can access to this place via their car, ktx, bus or even airplane.
- Date (Schedule): March 23~31 (9days)
- History: It was first held in 1997.
- Other similar festival:
- Photo:
- Special activities:
- Official Homepage

=== North Jeolla Province ===
Jeonju International Film Festival

- Region / Traffic: Opening/Closing Ceremonies at Moak Hall, Sori Arts Center of Jeollabuk-do. Theater at Megabox Jeonju, CGV Jeonju, Jeonju Cinema Town, Jeonju Digital Independent Cinema, Chonbuk National University Cultural Center
- Date (Schedule): 25 April (Thu) ~ 3 May (Fri), 2013, for 9 days
- History:
- Other similar Festival: BUSAN International Film Festival
- Special activities: Project Market which is help amateur film makers also held in near at the festival site.
- Official Homepage

Jeonju International Sori Festival

- Region / Traffic: (561-857) 31, Sori-ro, Deokjin-gu, Jeonju, Jeollabuk-do
- Date (Schedule): October 2 to October 6
- History: Chosen by the British World Music Magazine Songlines as one of 25 of the Best World Music Festivals and established in 2001, since 2011 extended to world music.

Pansori (or Sori) is one of the traditional Korean music forms.

- Other similar festival: This festival is first festival for Korean traditional music festival.
- Official Homepage

Muju Firefly festival

- Region / Traffic: Muju County

(Wisteria stage (special stage), Firefly gym, Arts & Sports Center, Kim Hwan-Tae Cultural Center & Choi Buk Art Center, Traditional crafts shop, Health experiencing center, Jinam Park, Namdaecheon Stream, Firefly Land (astronomical science center), firefly habitat)

- Date (Schedule): 2013.06.01 - 06.09
- History: The firefly is barometer of clean nature so the festival celebrates cleaning the environment.
- Other similar festival: Opening & closing ceremony, Culture & Arts Event, Folk Culture Experience Program, Environmental Exploration, Experience-based Event, Permanent Event etc.
- Special activities: Attendants can watch firefly in real nature not artificial space.
- Official Homepage

=== Jeju Province ===
Seongsan Sunrise Festival

- Region / Traffic: Seongsan, Jeju Island.
- Date (Schedule): Every end day of the year.
- History: Seongsan is the place where one of the famous watch site for sunrise in South Korea. Its beautiful scenery was written in book of Goryeo era. And every day lots of visitors hike this small mountain to watch a sunrise. For this reason, Jeju Province makes festival for visitors who want see first sunrise of the year.
- Other similar festivals: Hae-mazi (welcoming sunrise) festival in Busan Yeosu Hyangilam sunrise festival
- Special activities: Attendants can watch sunrise and make a wish to sun.

== Lists of festivals by topic ==
- Film festivals
- Music festivals
