= KQCF =

KQCF may refer to:

- KQCF (FM), a defunct radio station (88.1 FM) formerly licensed to serve Chiloquin, Oregon, United States
- Korea Queer Culture Festival
