= List of film festivals in South Korea =

List of film festivals in South Korea contains all film festivals in South Korea. The Busan International Film Festival is the largest in the country and one of the largest in Asia.

Festival	Hangul / Hanja	Type	Most Recent Date	Description	Reference
Asiana International Short Film Festival (AISFF)	아시아나국제단편영화제	Competition	November 11/5 - 11/10	Asiana International Short Film Festival (AISFF) is the first and largest international competitive short film festival in Korea. AISFF will be the best place to see the newest trend of world cinema through eyes of short films.	
International Film Festival of South Asia -- Seoul	제3회 서울남아시아영화제	December	December 1, 2023	International Film Festival of South Asia -- Seoul is a film festival focused on film from the South Asian diaspora.	
Bacchus 29-Second Film Festival	29초영화제	Competition	August 18	Launched in 2013, a festival where all the entries have to be 29 seconds long.	
Busan International Short Film Festival	부산국제단편영화제 BISFF	mixed	April 4/24 - 4/28	Launching in 1980, BISFF is the first short film festival in Korea. BISFF aspire to aesthetics in short films and has firmly established itself as the place to discover new, talented directors.	
Busan International Film Festival	부산국제영화제 釜山國際映畵祭	mixed	October 10/6 - 10/15	Busan International Film Festival is one of the most significant film festivals in Asia. After its establishment in 1996, BIFF has focused on introducing and supporting new Asian directors and their films. BIFF is a non-competitive festival but it also operates a competitive program. In 1998, BIFF launched Asian Project Market (APM, former Pusan Promotion Plan/PPP) followed by Asian Film Market in 2006.	
Busan International Kids and Youth Film Festival	부산국제어린이청소년영화제 BIKY	mixed	July 7/9- 7/15	Busan International Kids and Youth Film Festival was launched in 2005, it was the first children film festival(BiKi) in Korea. In 2015, BiKi changed the name to BIKY to include youth age group. BIKY has truly earned its reputation and stands out as the most renowned young film festival in Asia that shows more than 175 film from 55 countries every year.	
Daegu Independent Short Film Festival (DIFF)	대구단편영화제 DIFF	competition	August 8/11 - 8/16		
Daejeon Independent Film & Video Festival (DIFV)	대전독립영화제	competition	November 11/27 - 12/3	Launched in 2007, relaunched in 2013.	
EBS International Documentary Festival (EIDF)	EBS국제다큐멘터리 페스티벌	Competition	August 8/24 - 8/30	EIDF is one of Asia's prestigious documentary festivals. It began in 2004 and was presented by EBS, Korea's representative public television. Since 2004, EIDF had highlighted documentary films which were focused on Asia or were made on the Asian continent.	
Experimental Film and Video Festival in Seoul (EXIS)	서울 국제 실험영화 페스티벌	competition	August 8/20 - 8/27	Festival contributing to the creation of domestic experimental film and place of exchange for international experimental art.	
Film Festival for Woman Rights (FIWOM)	여성인권영화제, 피움	none	September 9/16 - 9/20	Film Festival for Women's Rights has been held to publicize the truth about violence against women and to spread the culture of supporting the victims' survival and recovering since 2006 by Korea Women's Hotline.	
Dae Jong Film Awards	대종상 영화제		November 20	Awards ceremony hosted by the Ministry of Culture and Information since 1962	
Seoul International Eco Film Festival	서울환경영화제 서울환경映畵祭	competition	June 6/2 - 6/8	Green Film Festival in Seoul is the first and biggest film festival in Korea focusing on environmental issues.	
Gwangju International Film Festival	광주국제영화제 光州國際映畵祭	non-competition	May 5/14 - 5/18	The Gwangju International Film Festival(GIFF) is presented by the Committee of Gwangju International Film Festival in Gwangju City. GIFF is non-competition film festival.	
Independent Film & Video Makers' Forum (INDIEFORUM)	인디포럼	mixed	May 5/21 - 5/28	Indie Forum, started in 1996, is a non-competitive film festival, focusing on cultural diversity and expanding independent cinema.	
Indie-AniFest	인디애니페스트	non-competitive	September 9/17 - 9/22	Focusing on Korean Independent Animator's experimental attempt and possibility, and presenting a vision through the expanding animation's area	
Jecheon International Music & Film Festival	제천국제음악영화제 堤川國祭映畵音樂祭	competition	August 8/13 - 8/18		
Jeju Film Festival	제주영화제		October 10/17 - 10/20		
Jeonju International Film Festival	전주국제영화제 全州國際映畵祭	none	April 4/30 - 5/9	Focuses on digital, independent and art films.	
Jeongdongjin Independent Film & Video Festival	정동진 독립영화제 正東津 獨立映畵祭	none	August 8/7 - 8/9	Summer festival since 1999. It is an outdoor film festival, held in the yard of Jeongdong elementary school.	
3D Korea International Film Festival	3D한국국제영화제; 3DKIFF	competition	September 9/5 - 9/7	The largest festival dedicated to 3D Film	
Korea International Expat Film Festival (KIXFF)	대한민국 국제 이방인 영화제; KIXFF	competition	June 6/21 - 6/23	Low-budget independent and "expat" films.	
Korea International Youth Film Festival	대한민국 국제 청소년영화제 大韓民國國 祭靑少年映畵祭	competition	October		
Korea Queer Film Festival (KQFF)	퀴어영화제	none	June 6/18 - 6/21	Since 2001, KQFF has proudly showcased films that depict lives of LGBT. KQFF has also thrived on increasing the varieties in movie genres that can promote the LGBT rights and cultures in South Korea. The festival is annually held in June.	
Korean Youth Film Festival	청소년영상페스티벌	competition	October	Held between 1975 and 1988 by Korean Motion Picture Promotion Corp. Short film competition for amateurs under the age of 30.	
Mise-en-scène Short Film Festival	미쟝센 단편영화제	competition	June 6/25 - 7/1	Mise-en-scène Short Film Festival(MSFF) is one of the most prestigious short film festivals in Korea. MSFF differentiates itself from the short film festivals by trying a new concept that short films can also be categorized into a genre.	
Seoul International New Media Festival	뉴 미디어 아트 페스티벌(네마프)	competition	August 8/6 - 8/14	We believe everyone has the potential to become an artist who can play through new media.	
Persons with Disabilities Film Festival	장애인영화제	none	October 10/16 - 10/19	Disabled and non-disabled beyond the movie with loved ones gathered a non-profit film festival to enjoy the movie.	
Bucheon International Fantastic Film Festival	부천국제판타스틱영화제 富川市國際판타스틱映畵祭	mixed	July 7/16 - 7/26	Also known as BiFan, focuses on Asian and international horror, thriller, mystery and fantasy films.	
Puchon International Student Animation Festival	부천국제대학 애니메이션페스티벌	mixed	November		
Seoul Human Rights Film Festival	서울인권영화제		May 5/15 - 5/17	In its 20th year, SHRFF takes place at Seoul Marronier Park, in Hyehwa. Festival focuses on Human Rights issues.	
Seoul Independent Documentary Film & Video Festival (SIDOF)	인디다큐페스티벌	none	March 3/26 - 4/1	Indie Documentary Festival to breathe and age. Oriented "experimental, progressive, dialogue and attracts Film Festival opens in the spring.	
Seoul Independent Film Festival (SIFF)	서울독립영화제	competition	November 11/26 - 12/4	Held every December, SIFF is a competition film festival and covers all sorts of film genres. It also provides an opportunity for independent filmmakers to join and develop solidarity an mutual understanding.	
Seoul International Film Festival (SIFF)	서울국제영화제	competition	September 9/20 - 9/26	The Seoul International Film Festival is one of the premier Asian film festivals, bringing together films, filmmakers, and fans from all around in one of the most dynamic cities in the world.	
Seoul International Agape Film Festival (SIAFF)	서울 국제사랑영화제	competition (Shorts)	April 4/23 - 4/30	(Can also be interpreted as Seoul Int'l Love FF): Scale | 14 Countries(53 films in total) - 23 Feature Films, 2 Medium-Length Films 28 Short Films - Premier 9 Films(World 5 Films, Asia 3 Films, Korea 1 Films)	
Seoul International Cartoon & Animation Festival (SICAF)	서울국제만화애니메이션 페스티벌	competition	May 5/23 -5/28	SICAF is Korea's largest cartoon and animation festival, and is a venue for cultural exchanges, bringing together cartoons and animated works from all around the world.	
Seoul International Family Film Festival (SIFFF)	서울국제가족영상축제	mixed	October		
SEOUL International Women's Film Festival (SIWFF)	서울여성영화제	mixed	May 5/27 - 6/3	After its establishment in 1997, SIWFF has taken its place as the world's biggest women's film festival.	
Seoul International Youth Film Festival	서울국제청소년영화제	competition	August 8/5 - 8/12		
University Film Festival of Korea (UNIFF)	대한민국 대학영화제	competition	December		
Women's Film Festival in Incheon (WFFII)	인천여성영화제 仁川女性映畵祭	mixed	July 7/9 - 7/12	The Women's Film Festival in Incheon presents the world "through the eyes of women".	
Women in Film Korea Festival	여성영화인축제		December		
Diaspora Film Festival(DIAFF)	디아스포라영화제	non-competition	May 21 - May 23	The Film Festival of Diaspora held in Incheon	

== See also ==
- Cinema of South Korea
- List of film festivals in Asia
- List of music festivals in South Korea
- List of festivals in South Korea
