= Daegu Queer Culture Festival =

Annual LGBT event in South Korea

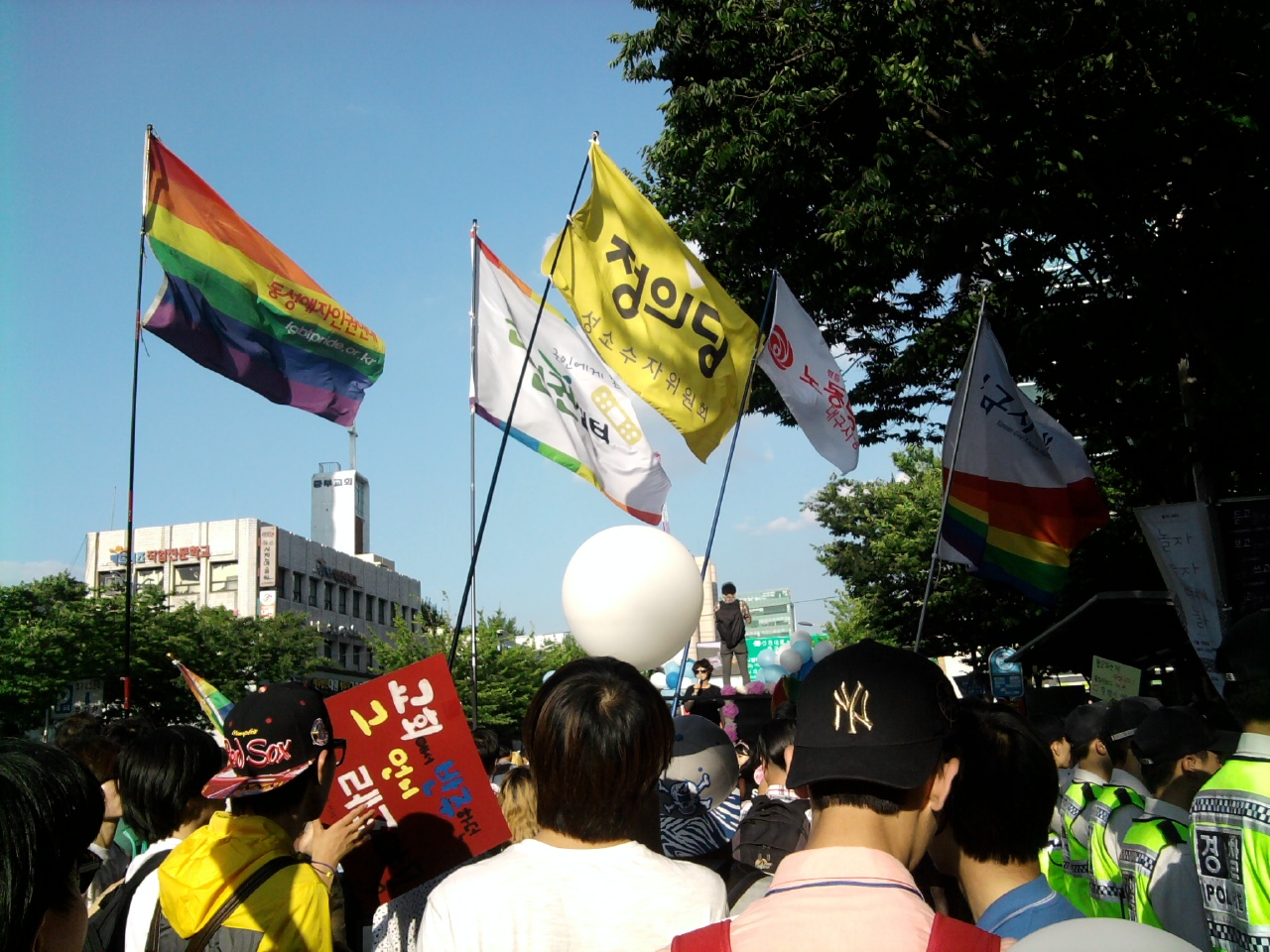
ROK Daegu LGBT Pride Parade, 2014

Daegu Queer Culture Festival (DQCF) or Daegu Queer Festival (Korean: 대구퀴어문화축제, romanized: Daegukwieomunhwachugje) is an annual modern Korean festival with the theme of LGBT rights. It includes a pride parade and film festival. The festival lasts for a week or two, and usually takes place in late June. The event has been held every year since 2009 and has faced opposition from religious groups. Opposition by religious groups has prohibited the Daegu Queer Culture Festival from being held on an outdoor stage on a popular street that is typically utilized for other festivities in Daegu. It is estimated that about 28 religious and right-wing groups have formed a "gay issue countermeasure committee" in Daegu to block the commencement of events that serve the LGBT community. These groups believe that article 11 of South Korea's constitution, which states that "discrimination in political, economic, social or cultural life on account of sex, religion or social status" does not apply to same-sex marriages. The organizer of the Korea Queer Culture Festival states that South Korea condones public homosexuality due to its conservative background. The older generations believe that homosexuality is a foreign phenomenon, which contributes to rejection and isolation of the homosexual and bisexual community.

== History ==
The concept of LGBT rights first surfaced in Korea in the mid-1990s, when popular culture started to bring along rapid change for homosexual and bisexual individuals due to the way popular culture restructured the relationship between sexuality and the power of individuality. Until the mid-1900s, it was considered taboo for homosexuals to demand the same rights as their counterparts. The LGBT community has often been alienated and stigmatized due to South Korea's inability to accept social differences. The first queer rights group, Chondonghwae, was founded in 1993 and went on to create campus groups such as Come Together at Yonsei University to inspire homosexuals and bisexuals to start queer parades and festivals within South Korea. The first queer film festival, organized by Come Together founder Seo-Dong-jin in 1997, was thwarted by local government officials. Electricity was cut off from the theater and threats of fines and jail time were made to deter the festival from moving forward. Many individuals participating in the pride parades would request the media to keep their identity hidden in the photographs taken at these events in fear of repercussions and conflict between family members.

In 2007, Pew Research Center Attitudes Survey found that 18% of South Koreans felt as if homosexuality should be tolerated within South Korean communities. The figures jumped from 18% to 39% in 2013, indicating change in South Korean attitude towards the LGBT community. Festivals such as the Daegu Queer Culture Festival and the Seoul Queer Films and Videos Festival allowed South Korea to create a safe haven for members of the LGBT community to connect, discuss, and demand representation and equality.

This event is Korea's second largest LGBT festival.

== See also ==
- LGBT rights in South Korea
- Korea Queer Culture Festival
- List of festivals in South Korea
- List of festivals in Asia
