= Mapo station =

Train station in South Korea

Coordinates: 37°32′23″N 126°56′46″E

마포; Mapo
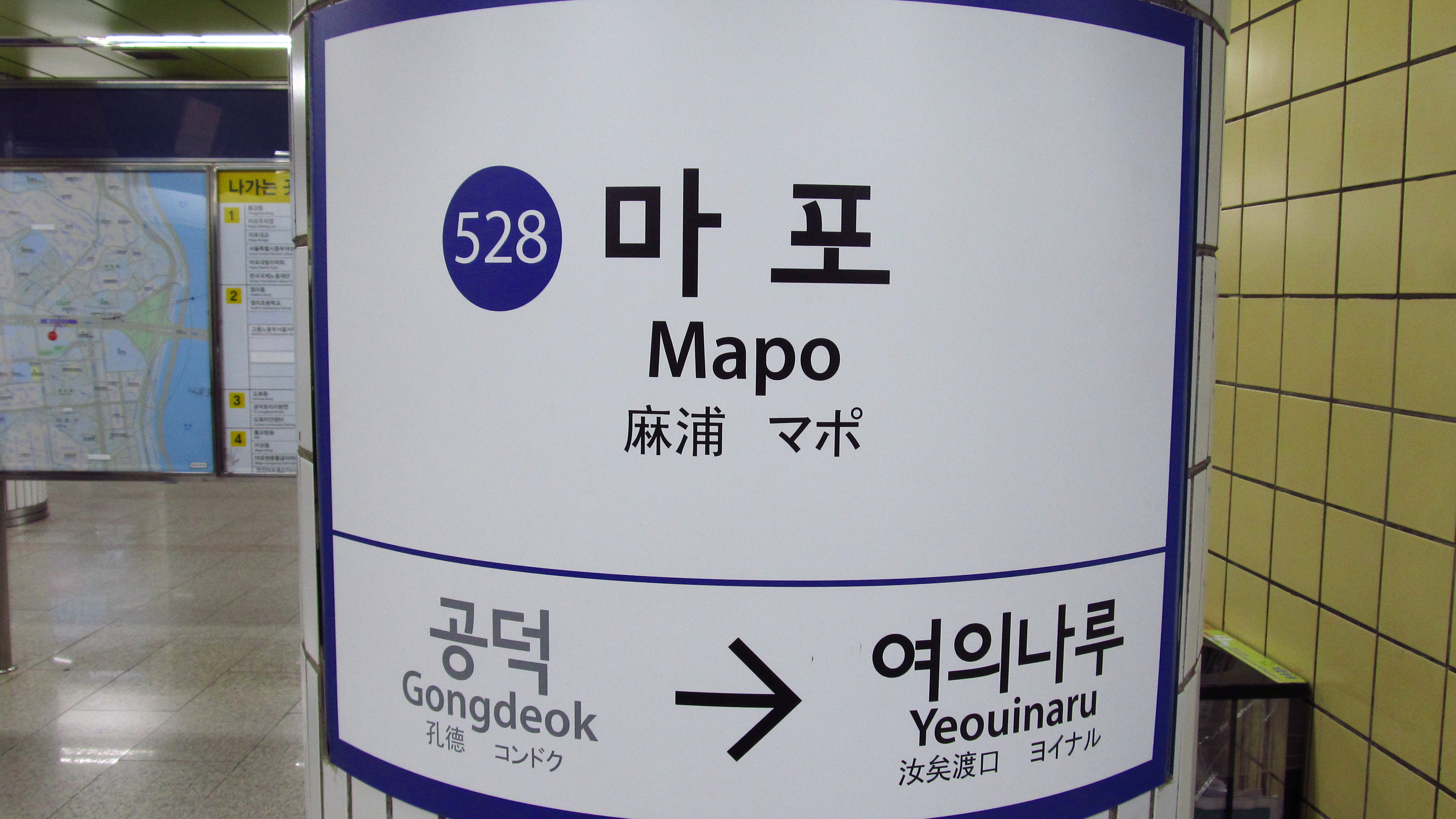
- Station sign in September 2018

Korean name
- Hangul: 마포역
- Hanja: 麻浦驛
- Revised Romanization: Mapo-yeok
- McCune–Reischauer: Map'o-yŏk

General information
- Location: 33 Mapodaero Jiha, 160 Dohwa-dong, Mapo-gu, Seoul
- Operator: Seoul Metro
- Line: Line 5
- Platforms: 1
- Tracks: 2

Construction
- Structure type: Underground

History
- Opened: December 30, 1996

Services
Preceding station	Seoul Metropolitan Subway	Following station
Yeouinaru towards Banghwa	Line 5	Gongdeok towards Hanam Geomdansan or Macheon
Location

Mapo Station is a station on Seoul Subway Line 5 in Mapo-gu, Seoul. It is located close to the northeastern end of the Mapo Bridge.

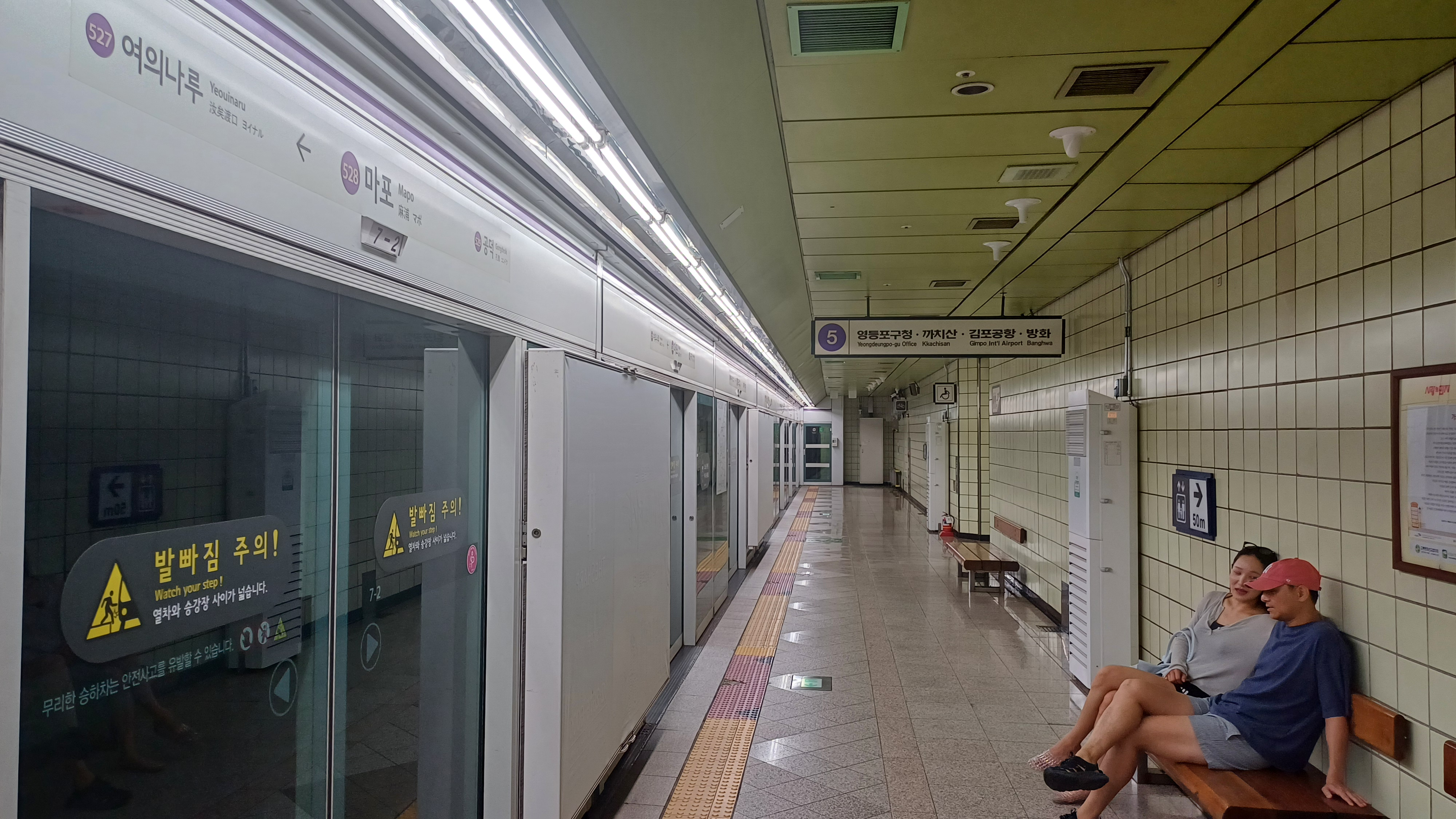
Station platform

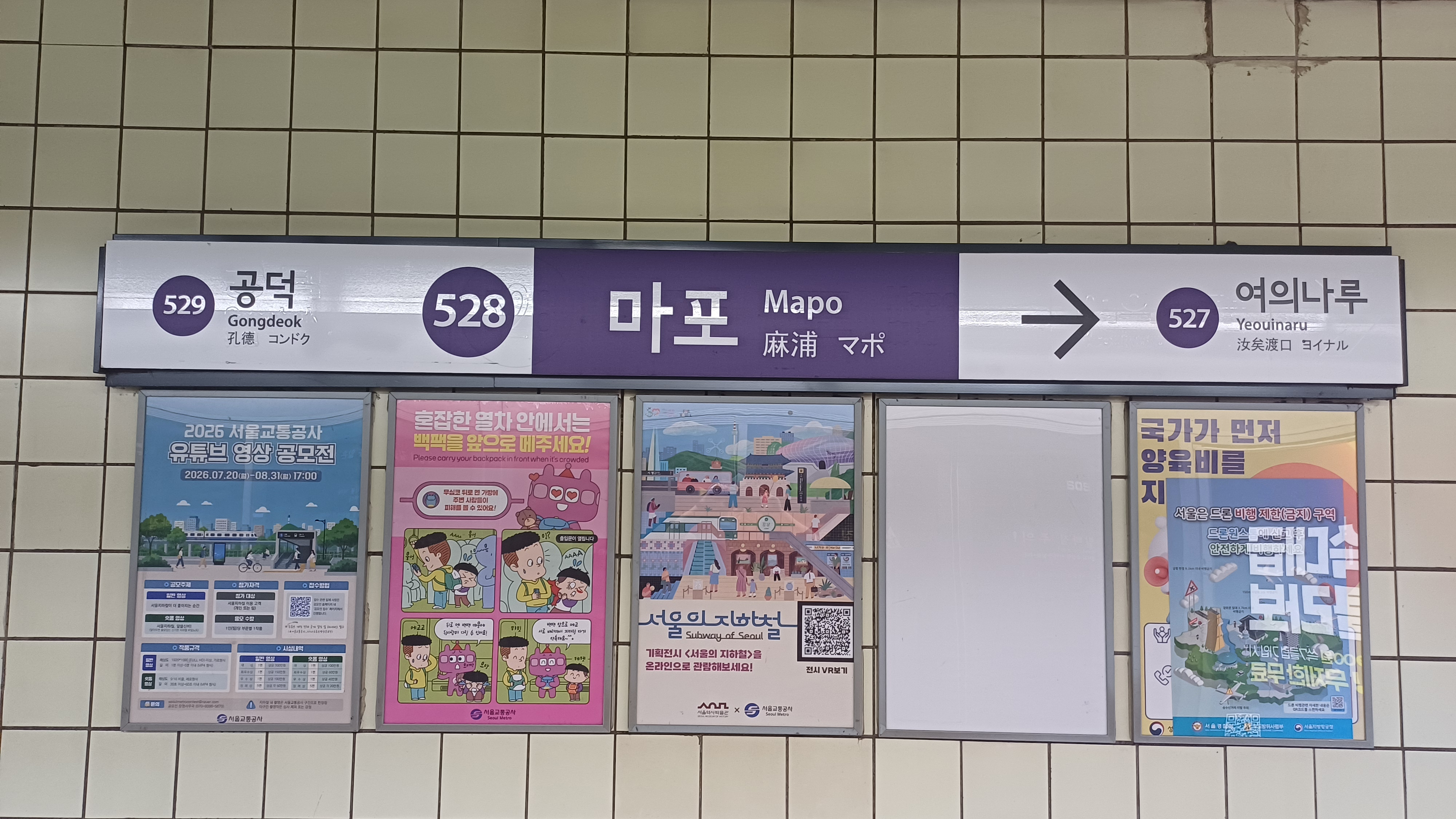
Alternative wall style station sign

== Station layout ==
G	Street level	Exit

L1; Concourse	Lobby	Customer Service, Shops, Vending machines, ATMs

L2; Platform	Westbound	← Line 5 toward Banghwa (Yeouinaru)
L2; Platform	Island platform, doors will open on the left
L2; Platform	Eastbound	Line 5 toward Hanam Geomdansan or Macheon (Gongdeok)→
