= 29 Second Film Festival =

- Location: Dasan Hall of the Korea Economic Daily in Cheongpa-ro, Seoul, Korea
- Founded: 2011
- Awards: Bacchus Grand Prize
- Hosted by: Korea Economic Daily
- No. of films: 1107 (2021)
- Festival date: 18 August 2021
- Language: Korean
- Website: 29 Second Film

Current 8th
- 9th 7th

The 29 Second Film Festival (Korean: 29초영화제) is a South Korean Film Festival, which began in 2011, where all the entries have to be 29 seconds long . It is hosted by Korea Economic Daily and supervised by the Secretariat of 29 Second Film Festival.

The 8th Bacchus 29 Second Film Festival was held on August 18, 2021. Due to COVID-19 pandemic it was held online. 1107, 29 second films were competing for prizes in 2021.

== Award winners ==
=== 2013 ===
- 29s film Award : Living in South Korea as OOO.
- S-OIL GOOD 29s film Award : "Theme 1: Better world" and "Theme2: Hero".

=== 2021 ===
- Grand Prize : My Stop for Recovery from Fatigue is My Daughter's Heart by Ji Seung-hwan
- Grand Prize for the youth department : My Stop for Fatigue is No. 1804 by Jo In-hyuk, director of Incheon Yeonsu High School
- Grand Prize for the General Division : My Stop for Fatigue is Ricianthus by Yoon Ji-hyeon

== See also ==
- List of film festivals in South Korea
- List of festivals in Asia
