= Seoul Queer Culture Festival =

Korean LGBT festival

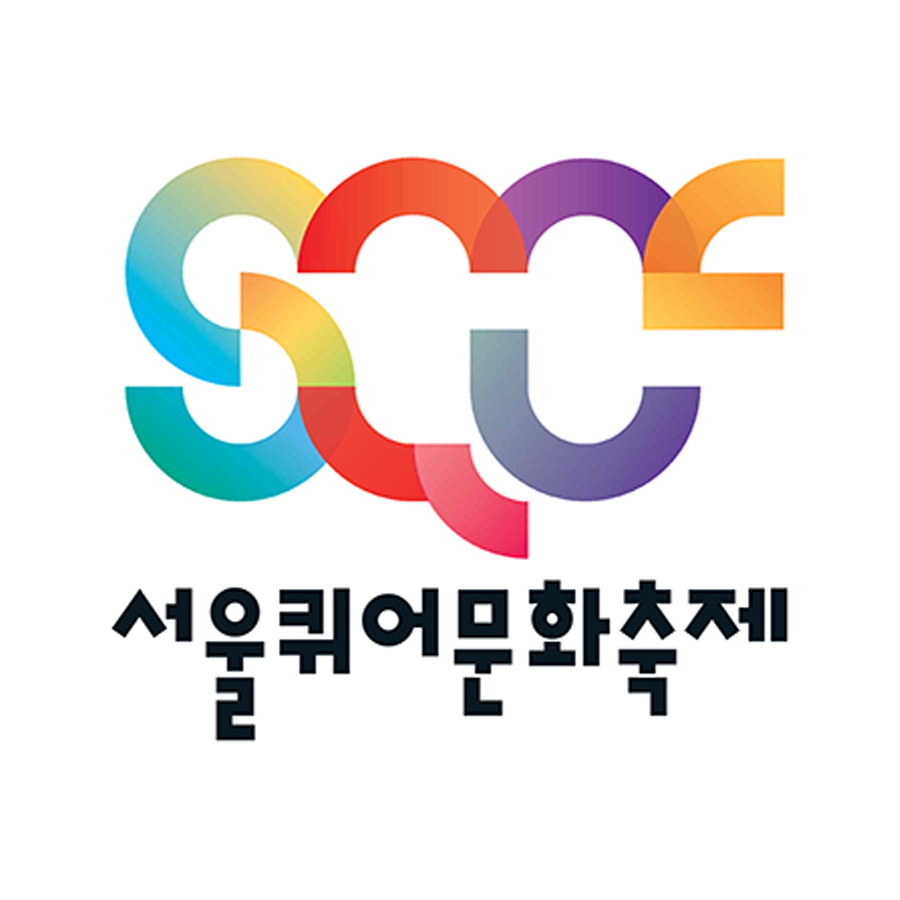

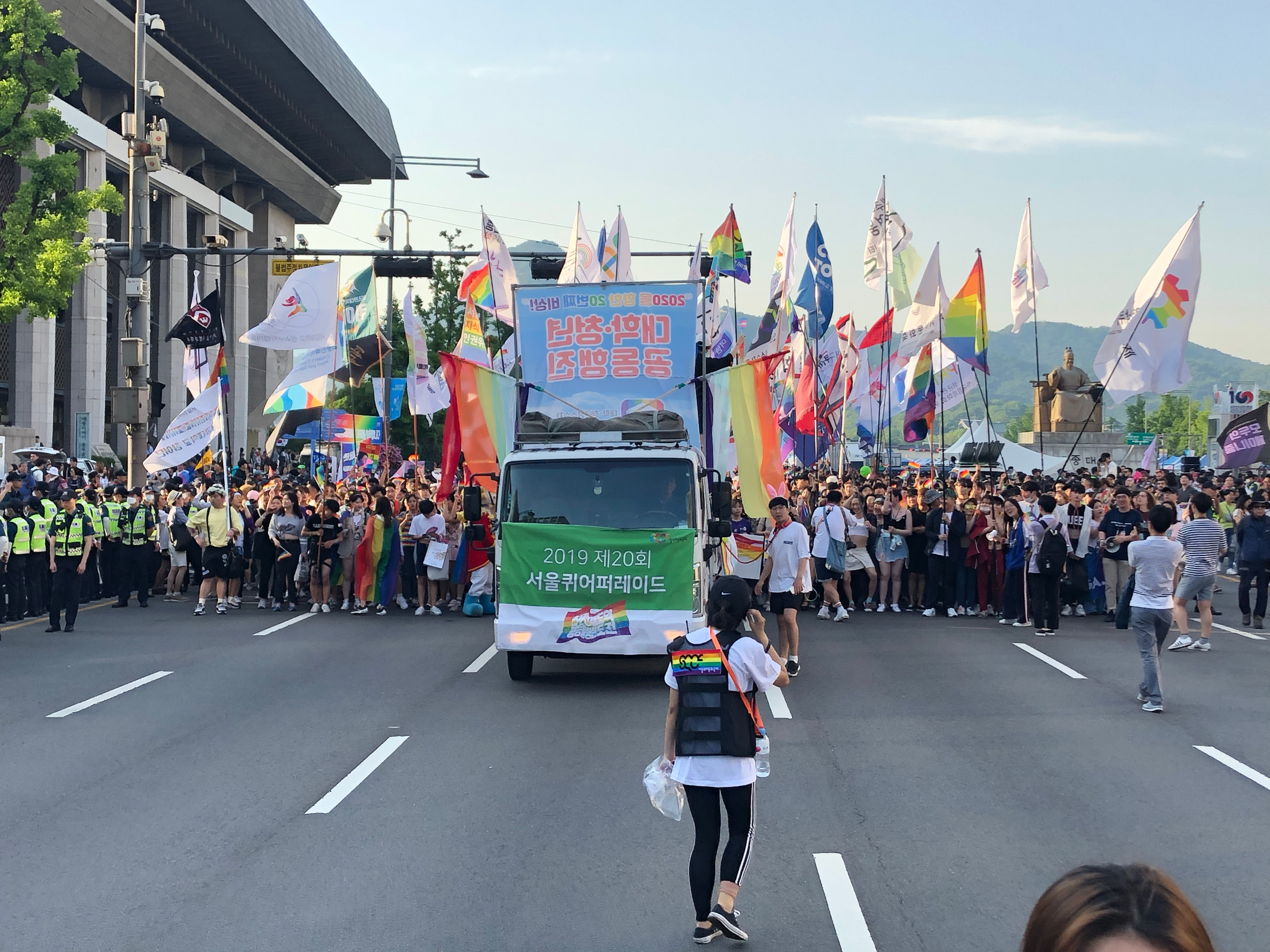
- Seoul Queer Culture Festival's pride parade in 2019, around the Gwanghwamun Plaza
- Frequency: Annually
- Locations: Seoul, South Korea
- Founded: 2000; 26 years ago
- Chief organizer: Yang Sun-Woo
- Website: sqcf.org

- South Korean name
- Hangul: 서울퀴어문화축제
- Hanja: 서울퀴어文化祝祭
- RR: Seoul kwieo munhwa chukje
- MR: Sŏul k'wiŏ munhwa ch'ukche
- IPA: [sʰʌ.uɭ kʰy.ʌ munɸa tɕʰuk̚t͈ɕe]

Seoul Queer Culture Festival (SQCF; Korean: 서울퀴어문화축제), formerly Korea Queer Culture Festival (KQCF; 한국퀴어문화축제) until 2018, is an annual modern Korean festival on LGBT rights. It usually features a combined festival, pride parade and street party, and also includes a film festival. The festival lasts for a week or two and usually takes place in late May to early June. It began with around 50 attendees in 2001. As it was the only queer culture festival in Korea until 2009, when Daegu Queer Culture Festival began, it was also commonly called Korea Queer Festival or Queer Culture Festival (QCF). (Note: English language sources, including the event's own English-language webpage (as of 2014) use both names, inconsistently. In Korean, the short name is only 퀴어문화축제, translating directly as "Queer Culture Festival" and not including the adjective "Korean".) The event is Korea's largest LGBT festival, and

== History ==
=== 2000–13: First events and growth ===
The festival first took place in the year 2000. The pride parade that year took place in the Daehangno area and reportedly had 50 attendees; some onlookers "cursed and yelled aggressively", while others were simply disinterested. Since 2001 the festival has included a film festival, Korea Queer Film Festival (KQFF).

The 9th edition in 2009 around the Cheonggye cheon area had a larger number of participants and a more peaceful atmosphere. The 2010 festival was held in the Jongno area of Seoul. The event was also attended by representatives of a number of Korean NGOs, including Baram Sory, the Korean Gay Men's Human Rights Group, the Korean Lesbian Foundation, the Lesbian Counseling Center in South Korea, Korean Womenlink, Outeen, Unninetwork and Project Butchway 2010 film studio.

In 2011, the 12th edition of the festival was held in the Hanbit Media Park in the Cheonggyecheon area of Seoul. Churches and political parties were among that year's festival participants.

The 14th edition of the festival in 2013 took place in the Hongdae area of Seoul and gathered about 10,000 attendants, a record number. Like most editions it featured a pride parade and a film festival. Notable attendees included Korean LGBT celebrities Harisu and Kim-Jho Gwangsoo.

=== 2014: "Love Conquers Hate" and disruption by religious groups ===
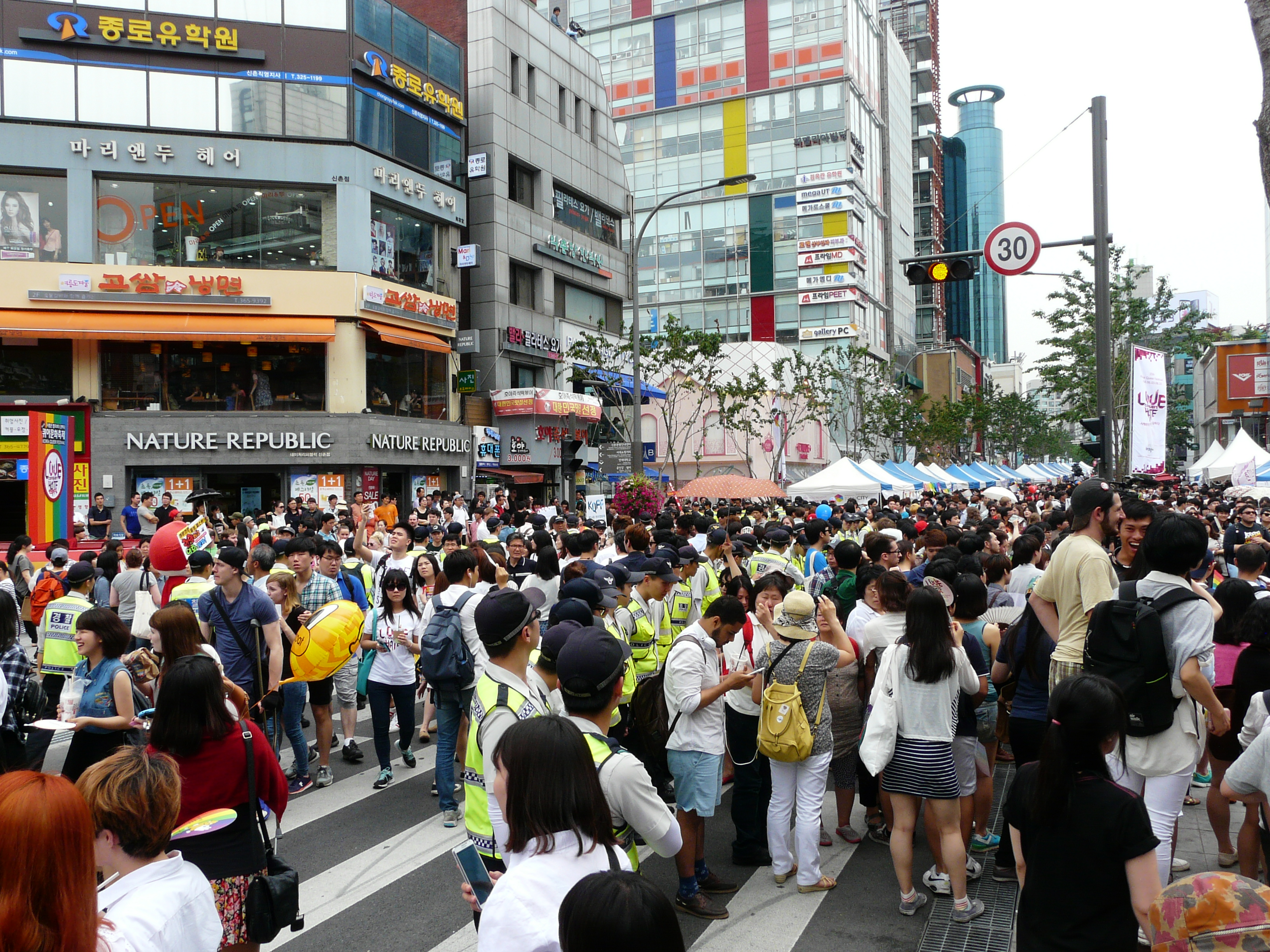
The Queer Culture Festival in 2014

The 15th edition of the festival, taking place on 7 June 2014 in the Sinchon area of Seoul, near Yonsei University, declared its goal as protesting against "the oppression of LGBT people in Russia and Korea, and show support and solidarity within the LGBT community". The 2014 festival lasted over a week, and events included a pride parade and usual film festival. With the theme "Love Conquers Hate", It received official support from Google, and drew an estimated 10,000 to 15,000 attendees. A first at the event was a ceremonial blessing by Christian clergy in support of it including Min-Kim Jong Hun, also known as Father Zacchareus, and Reverend Lim Borah.

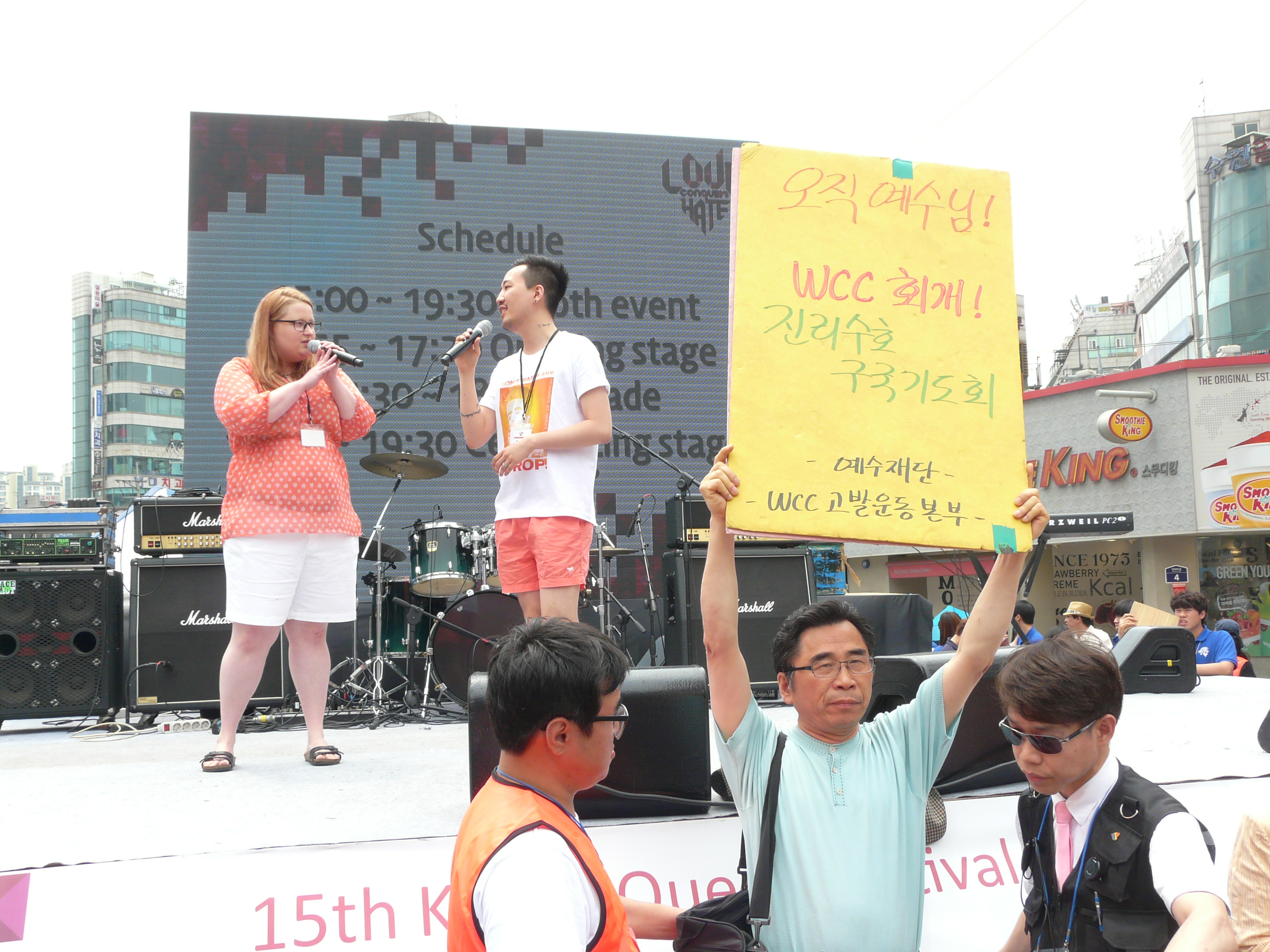
The Festival in 2014 was disrupted by a number of protesters. Here, one of the protesters is holding a sign in front of the festival's stage.

The festival organizers reported that days before the festival was about to start, the government withdrew permission from them, declaring it "inappropriate" in light of the recent Sinking of MV Sewol; the organizers stated that they believed this was a pretext used by unfriendly Christian groups trying to sabotage the festival by sending numerous complaints to the government. The organizers were prepared to disobey the authorities and hold the event even without official permission. In the end, government officials did not prevent the festival from taking place but issued permission to conservative, religious anti-LGBTQ rights groups to hold rallies at the same time and location. This led to several disruptions and delays. For example, a Protestant group of hundreds of anti-LGBTQ protestors disrupted the parade by lying down with linked arms in front of the parade vehicles and refused to move when police intervened, extending the parade's runtime until late in the night instead of its scheduled ending prior to 6pm. This was the first instance of an organized opposition to the parade being mobilized in its history. Three weeks later on 28 June, almost a thousand anti-LGBTQ protestors blocked the Daegu event's parade.

=== 2015–17: Police denial, successful appeal, and support from organizations ===
There was intense opposition when organizers were searching for a location and applying for event registration for the 2015 event, leading the applicants to camp out non-stop for eight days at Namdaemun police station with supporters delivering them food and drink; Christian conservative groups had been tipped off in advance and had positioned themselves at the start of the queue to register their own anti-LGBTQ event. Police eventually denied both the LGBTQ and anti-LGBTQ events based on the Act on Assemblies and Demonstrations which stated that "rallies may be banned when two or more rallies are planned by groups with conflicting goals" and "a possibility of inconvenience to pedestrian and vehicle traffic." This denial attracted international attention to the event, with most of it being critical of the progress made regarding LGBT rights in South Korea. Human Rights Watch expressed concern in a public online letter to the President of Korea. However, the KQCF organizers contested the police's denial and won, and secured the event at a later date than planned at Seoul Plaza. It would remain a fixture in front of Seoul City Hall, with interruptions in 2020 and 2021, until 2023. On the day of the event, while there were more attendees of the KQCF than anti-LGBT protestors, those latter protestors numbered nearly 10,000. As the United States Supreme Court had legalized same-sex marriage earlier that year, the US embassy in Seoul raised a large rainbow flag on its building for the first time and the US ambassador took part alongside other ambassadors, reading a joint declaration in support of LGBTQ rights.

The event was held again in 2016, with 50,000 attendees and nearly 100 booths including that of the Korean Confederation of Trade Unions as well as student organizations, progressive political parties, and foreign national embassies. The 2017 event, at which there were an estimated 80,000 attendees, saw the National Human Rights Commission opening a booth at the festival for the first time, and 13 foreign missions attended.

=== 2018–present: Renaming and increasing attendance ===
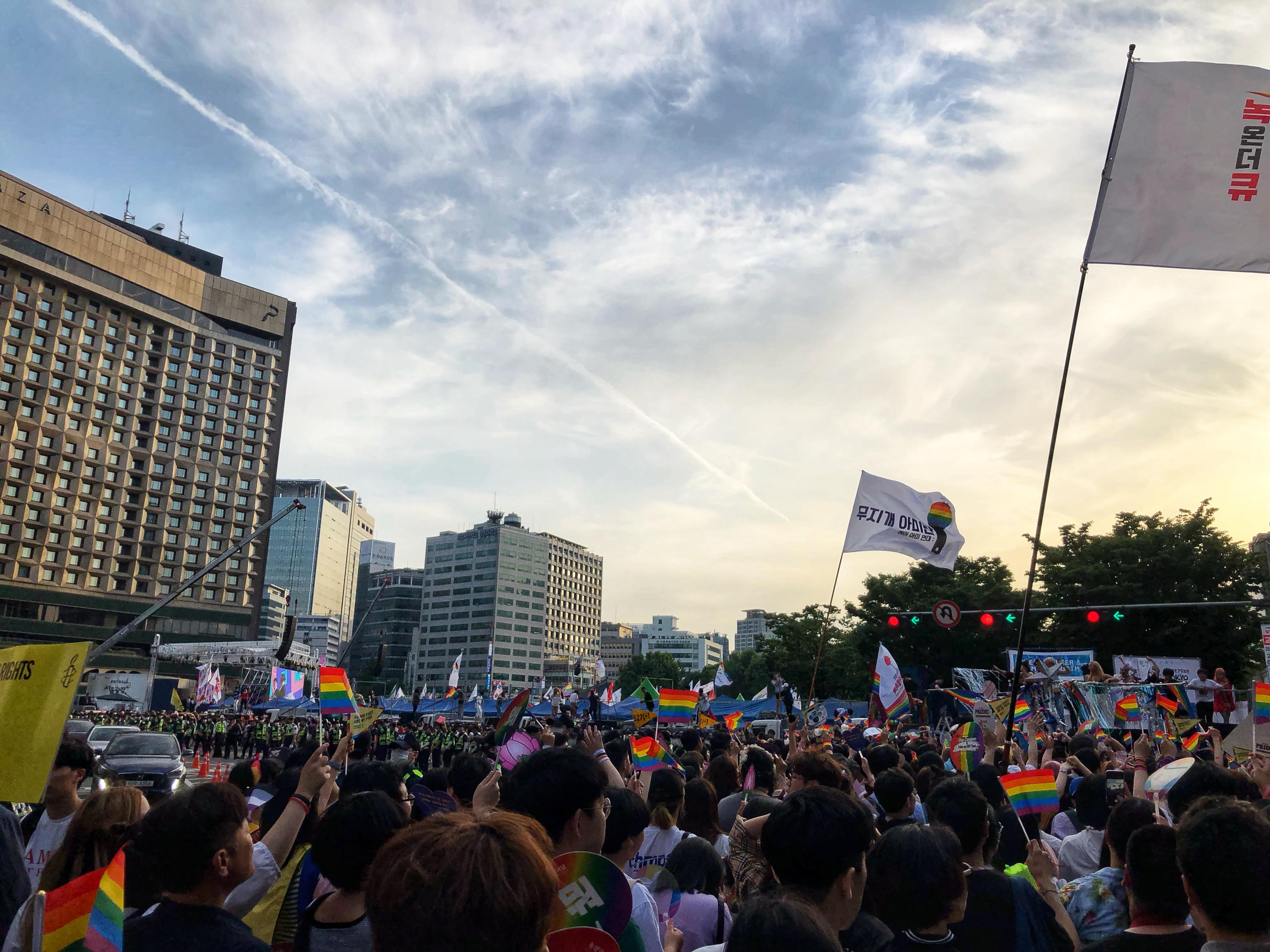
Seoul Queer Culture Festival was attended by around 150,000 people in 2019

In 2018, the event was officially renamed from the Korea Queer Culture Festival to the Seoul Queer Culture Festival; this decision was made partially to encourage local gatherings, some of which had already been founded including those in Daegu (2009), Busan and Jeju (2017). 2018 saw 120,000 attendees at the festival, making the festival one of the largest of its kind in Asia. At the 2019 event, there were an estimated 150,000 spectators.

In 2020 and 2021, rules concerning the COVID-19 pandemic prevented gatherings and thus the SQCF.

In 2022, six foreign ambassadors from the United Kingdom, United States, Australia, Canada, New Zealand and the European Union expressed their support of the SQCF. The inclusion of Gilead Sciences, known for manufacturing HIV prevention drug PrEP at a cost considered prohibitive for LGBTQ individuals, was controversial at the 2022 event.

In May 2023, Seoul’s city government effectively blocked the festival from taking place outside Seoul City Hall by granting a permit a Christian youth concert, hosted by the CTS Cultural Foundation, instead. CTS, a Christian broadcaster, had vocally opposed both homosexuality and the festival itself. THE SQCF was instead held nearby, with the parade of an estimated 35,000 to 50,000 people beginning hundreds of metres from City Hall. 155,000 people attended the 2023 festival overall according to organisers. That year, a group of over 40 activists organised a party named No Pride (노프라이드), aiming to object to the inclusion of pharmaceutical corporations and foreign embassies in booths at SQCF, particularly that of Gilead.

In May 2024, the panel overseeing events at Seoul Plaza again denied the SQCF's request to hold its festival there, instead electing to run an "outdoor library" in the space. Instead, SQCF moved several blocks downtown from City Hall to a location which only needed police permission for the event. In June 2024, though SQCF went ahead, a protest against the festival was held in a separate location in central Seoul at which thousands of participants held blue flags and signs with phrases such as "No to homosexuality Queer Festival". No Pride continued at the 2024 event, this time with the tagline "No Pride in Genocide" in response to Israel's attacks on Gaza and the United States government's alleged complicity in the humanitarian crisis. As a result, they continued to object to the SQCF's inclusion of the US Embassy in its event while stating that they were not anti-Pride or anti-SQCF.

== Political endorsements ==
The event attracts support from small Korean political parties, the Democratic Labor Party and New Progressive Party; more conservative members of Korean government take a neutral stance towards the event. The festival receives no significant support from the government. In 2017, the National Human Rights Commission of Korea participated in the festival for the first time as a government agency.

== Privacy concerns ==
Following the first event in 2000, a no-photography policy was implemented to protect attending individuals from being outed, through which media and attendees could not take photos without explicit consent. This led to the early KQCF gatherings being poorly visually documented. From 2010, photography policy began to be relaxed due to the increased ubiquity of cameras, though no-photography stickers and ribbons saw continued use by individuals who did not want to be photographed. In 2011, organizers required registration for all photographers and video recorders and asked photo-takers to blur participants' faces before publishing pictures online. In 2012, face masks and sunglasses, obscuring participants' features, were reported as common, allowing the photography of individuals who wanted to remain anonymous. In the late 2000s and early 2010s, anti-gay protesters were known to take pictures of participants and distribute them.

== See also ==
- LGBT rights in South Korea
- Daegu Queer Culture Festival
