= Buyeo Seodong Lotus Festival =

Annual summer festival in South Korea

The Buyeo Seodong Lotus Festival is an annual seasonal summer festival in South Korea held at Gungnamji, the first man-made pond in the nation, in Buyeo County, South Chungcheong Province.

== Background ==
In the name of the festival, Buyeo is the place. Seodong was a prince of Baekje Kingdom who became King Mu, the 30th monarch of the respective kingdom. Visitors can view 10 million lotus blossoms and a range of lotus flower varieties, including red and white lotuses as well as water lilies. This festival celebrates the beauty of lotus flowers and emphasizes the importance of wild flower preservation. Buyeo Seodong Lotus Festival was designated an excellent festival four years in a row, 2015–2018, by South Korea's Ministry of Culture, Sports, and Tourism. The Buyeo Seodong Lotus Festival, Korea's representative summer flower festival, was selected as an 'Excellent Festival' in 2015, following the promising festival for three consecutive years of Korean culture and tourism selected by the Ministry of Culture, Sports, and Tourism from 2012 to 2014 since its inception in 2003. The festival takes place every July during the peak summer season when lotus flowers are at bloom. The festival is based on a historical love story, with programs and performance events focused on story delivery.

=== Programs ===
Many of the activities are centered on lotus, like making lotus flowers using paper and making lotus flower soap. At night, the pond is illuminated with lights and sculptures. Some popular events at the festival are the performances showcasing a royal love story, a night parade featuring Prince Seodong and Princess Seonhwa, performances of traditional music and dance, experiences of Baekje culture, and a photo contest that involves printing lotus flowers on shirts and handkerchiefs. Other activities include lotus food tasting and participating in a lotus leaf tea ceremony; a multimedia show; a lotus canoe experience; and a lotus air balloon. On the 20th Buyeo Seodong Lotus Festival in 2022, a sky bike and waterside train were introduced.

=== History ===
Chungchecheongnam-do and Chungcheongbuk-do provinces during the Baekje period (18 BCE–660 CE) were of prime importance. These provinces in the present day consist of many registered UNESCO World Heritage relics. Gungnamji Pond is an artificial pond made during King Mu's (r. 600–641) reign; he was the 30th king of Baekje Kingdom. It is Korea's first artificial pond. The lotus festival is held around Gungnamji Pond, which bears the legend of Seodang's birth. The present-day pond was restored in 1965 and 1967. In addition to that, a small pavilion, the Poryongjeong Pavilion, was set up in the middle of the pond at the end of the wooden bridge. Gungnamji Pond with Historic Site No. 135 (designated on June 10, 1964), located in Seodong Park, is the place where the legend of King Mu, who married Princess Seonhwa of Silla, dwells. The name Gungnamji's literal meaning is pond in the south of the royal palace in Korea, named according to the Samguksagi record. According to Samguksagi, there is a record that says, "In the 35th year of King Mu of Baekje (634), a pond was dug to the south of the palace, water was brought in from about 20 miles away through the 8-km waterway to plant cherry trees and willow trees around it, and an island was made in the middle of the pond, symbolizing Bangjangseonsan Mountain". Judging from this, it can be seen that this pond was a palace garden built during the reign of King Mu of Baekje. From the hill to the east of the pond, stylobates, cornerstones, pieces of roof tiles, and pieces of bowls from the Baekje period were excavated, suggesting that there must have been a palace nearby. Gungnamji Pond, which created a pavilion in the middle of a pond to express the idea of Taoism and pray for longevity, is the oldest artificial garden in Korea, and it is said that Baekje's Nojagong(노자공) went to Japan and passed on Baekje's garden landscaping techniques. It can be seen that Baekje was excellent at gardening techniques among the three kingdoms. It is a beautiful tourist destination in all four seasons. In July, the Seodong Lotus Festival, a beautiful feast of 10 million lotuses, is held, and in October and November, the Chrysanthemum Exhibition decorated with various works is held, adding to the beauty of Gungnamji Pond.

=== Folklore and legends ===
The love story of Seodong and Princess Seonhwa, also known as Seodongyo (Song of Seodong). In the area around Gungnamji Pond, known as the site of a palace during the Baekje era, the legend of King Mu, whose childhood name was Seodong or Madong, both meaning yam child, has been handed down. "In the kingdom of Buyeo, a widower who lived alone outside the palace near the pond to the south of the palace communicated with the dragon of Gungnamji and gave birth to a son. He is the 30th king of Baekje, King Mu (600–641)." However, life outside the palace was poor, so the family dug up and sold yams to make a living. That is why his childhood name was Seodong. Despite her poverty, Seo-dong's mother raised him with sincerity. He grew up to be a leader with a strong body and extreme filial piety. Then one night, an old man came from the palace and delivered the king's secret order to infiltrate Silla's Seorabeol and spy on state affairs. Seodong gladly accepted and disguised himself as a hemp seller to infiltrate Silla and faithfully carry out his detection activities. Then one day he heard rumors about Princess Seonhwa, the third daughter of King Jinpyeong (579–632), the 26th king of Silla, and headed to Gyeongju (then Seorabeol). Seodong went to a place where many children of Seorabeol gathered, distributed yam, and made them sing. "Princess Seonhwa gets married secretly and secretly visits Seodong every night." This song spread all over the country through the mouths of children. In the end, Princess Seonhwa, who soon reached the palace, was misunderstood and exiled. Seodong, knowing this in advance, joined her on the road. As the two met more often, love blossomed, so he brought Princess Seonhwa to Baekje. Later, Seodong earned trust from the king and eventually became King Mu of Baekje, who went on to found Mireuk Temple, giving rise to the legend of Mireuksa. There are some conflicts with the actual records of events, this legend can also be an output of the historical policy of alliance between Silla and Baekje through marriage. This legend of Seodong is a love story between a man and a woman of different nationalities and statuses. Also associated with hyangga is the Silla verse form title "Seodongyo" (Song of Seodong)".
