= Korea Queer Film Festival =

Korea Queer Film Festival (KQFF) (한국퀴어영화제)
- Location: Seoul, South Korea
- Founded: 2001
- Language: International
- Website: https://www.kqff.co.kr

The Korea Queer Film Festival (KQFF) (Korean: 퀴어영화제) is a film festival held annually in Seoul that showcases the lives of sexual minorities, which seeks to increase diversity in Korean films and LGBTQ rights, and give insight into queer culture. KQFF was established in 2001 and has been held annually ever since. KQFF is the oldest gay and lesbian film festival in Korea, and is part of the Korea Queer Culture Festival. It aims to screen rare modern and older films on a wide range of LGBTQ topics. KQFF was originally named the "Rainbow Film Festival" (무지개영화제) for its 1st through 6th years, then changed its name to the "Seoul LGBT Film Festival" (서울LGBT영화제) for its 7th through 13th years, and since the 14th year has been referred to as the “Korean Queer Film Festival” (한국퀴어영화제). The festival aims to support and celebrate the LGBT community, to contribute to the development of LGBTQ films, to build a network among domestic and international filmmakers, establish cultural diversity and to be actively involved in cultural activism for LGBTQ rights.

== History ==
=== 2002: "A New Beginning: Coming Out Celluloid" ===
The second annual Korea Queer Film Festival was held in 2002 from June 4 to 6 in “Gwanghwamun Il-Joo Arthouse - My Artcube” in Jongno-Gu in Seoul. The 2002 festival featured 18 films from 3 countries (Korea, the United States, and Argentina).

=== 2003: "Homosexual Lover, Homo, and Us" ===
The third annual Korean Queer Film Festival was held in the same location as in 2002: “Gwanghwamun Il-Joo Arthouse - My Artcube” in Jongno-Gu in Seoul. The 2003 festival featured 7 films from 4 countries (the U.S., Colombia, Australia, and Canada). No Korean films were shown this year. In addition, the films shown were all from previous years, ranging from the late 80s to late 90s. Films were shown in three categories: Dyke Drama, Their Story, and Hey, Victor.

==== Section A: Dyke Drama ====
- "Ife" by H Len Keller (USA)
- "Things We Said Today" by John Miller-Monzon (USA)
- "Maya" by Caihanne Benedex (USA)
- "A Certain Grace" by Sandra Nettelbeck (USA)

==== Section B: Their Story ====
- "Tampon Thief" by Jorge Lozano (Colombia)
- "Chrissy" by Jacqui North (Australia)

==== Section C: Hey, Victor ====
- Salut Victor by Anne Claire Poirier (Canada)

=== 2004: "A Shared Life" ===
The fourth annual Korean Queer Film Festival was held June 25 to 29 in 2004, in “Gwanghwamun Il-Joo Arthouse - My Artcube” in Jongno-Gu in Seoul. The 2004 festival featured 13 films from 3 countries (Taiwan, Korea, and Japan).

==== Feature films ====
- Goodbye, Dragon Inn by Tsai Ming-liang (Taiwan)
- Love Me, If You Can by Alice Wang (Taiwan)
- Desire by Kim Eun-Soo (Korea)
- Camellia Project-Three Queer Stories of Bogil Island by Choi Jin-sung, So Joon-moon, and Lee-Song Hee-il (Korea)

==== Short films ====
- "때와 장소를 가리지 않는다" ("I do not choose when or where") by 카쥬 오쉬 (Japan)
- Boys Briefs by 사이먼 청 (Japan)
- "My Father's Song" by 이지선 (Korea)
- "Wonderful Day" by Kim Hyun-Pil (Korea)
- "A Crimson Mark" by Hyeon-jin Park (Korea)
- "Military Tango" by 황종원 (Korea)

=== 2005: "Beyond the Rainbow Bridge" ===
The fifth annual Korea Queer Film Festival was held in 2005 from June 3 to 7 at the “Gwanghwamun Il-Joo Arthouse - My Artcube” in Jongno-Gu in Seoul. The 2005 festival featured 15 films from three countries (Korea, Japan, and the U.S.).

"Section A: Korean Short Films - 1"
Title	Director	Country of origin	Release year	Length	Film Format
I'll Get This Amount (이 만큼만 가져갈게)	성새론	Korea	2004	15 min	DV6mm
The Helmet (헬멧)	One (원)	Korea	2004	25 min	DV6mm
Why Not Community (와이 낫 커뮤니티)	Park Yong-je (박용재)	Korea	2004	8 min	DV6mm
Lesbian Censorship In School 1 (이반검열)	Lee Young (이영)	Korea	2005	20 min	unknown

"Section B: Korean Short Films - 2"
Title	Director	Country of origin	Release year	Length	Film Format
그럼 당연히 괜찮지	신조 영화	Korea	2004	15 min	DV6mm
Me And Doll-Playing (나와 인형놀이)	김경묵	Korea	2004	19 min	DV6mm
제이슨과 웨이나의 이야기	장윤주	Korea	2004	6 min	DV6mm
내가 사랑하는 그녀	모기	Korea	2004	5 min	DV6mm
난 듬직하지 않아	찹찹찹	Korea	2004	8 min	DV6mm
Ddingdong (띵동!)	치치, 사포, 찌끼	Korea	2004	6 min	DV6mm
진이신이 이야기	영화공작소 땀 제작	Korea	2004	unknown	DV6mm

"Section C: Japanese Special - Queer Boys and Girls on the Bullet Train"
Title
Queer Boys and Girls on the Shinkansen (급행열차를 탄 퀴어들):

서막	하바카리-시네마 제작
평행 접촉	하세가와 rps지
나는 콧노래를 부르고 그녀는 걷다가 부딪친다	이리
열쇠	강 옌니
랩! 랩!-10cs3	울랄라 사토코
제목 없는 슬라이드 쇼	하타 토모아키
199X, 치명적 구타를 위한 테크닉.	타카사키 케이치
마키29	히라이 요코
키스해줘	이마이즈미 코이치
어느 황홀한 순간	이와사 히로키
바이 바이 ‘오버 더 레인보우’	허슬러 아키라

Director
various
Country of origin
Japan
Release year
2004
Length
58 min
Film Format
DV6mm

"Section D: Feature Films"
Title	Director	Country of origin	Release year	Length	Film Format
High Art (하이 아트)	Lisa Cholodenko (리사 촐로덴코)	USA	1998	101 min	35mm

"Section E: Feature Film"
Title	Director	Country of origin	Release year	Length	Film Format
Funeral Parade of Roses (장미의 행렬)	Toshio Matsumoto (마츠모토 토시오)	Japan	1969	105 min	unknown

"Section F: Feature Film"
Title	Director	Country of origin	Release year	Length	Film Format
백합의 향연	Sachi Hamano (하마노 사치)	Japan	2001	101 min	35mm

=== 2006: "Queer Happy Point" ===
The sixth annual Korea Queer Film Festival was held in 2006 from June 6 to 11 at the “Seoul Art Cinema (Hollywood Theater)” (서울아트시네마 (허리우드극장)) in Jongno-Gu in Seoul. The 2006 festival featured 10 films from 5 countries (the U.S., Switzerland, Israel, Germany, and Thailand).

=== 2007: "express you SeLFF" ===
The seventh annual Korea Queer Film Festival was held in 2007 from June 6 to 10 at the “Seoul Art Cinema (Hollywood Theater)” (서울아트시네마 (허리우드극장)) in Jongno-Gu in Seoul. The 2007 festival featured 15 films from 7 countries (the U.S., UK, Korea, Japan, Germany, and Taiwan).

=== 2008: "enjoy! your SeLFF" ===
The eighth annual Korea Queer Film Festival was held in 2008 from June 4 to 8 at the “Seoul Art Cinema (Hollywood Theater)” (서울아트시네마 (허리우드극장)) in Jongno-Gu in Seoul. The 2008 festival featured 20 films from 9 countries (the U.S., Japan, Thailand, Canada, Korea, Australia, France, Brazil, and UK).

=== 2009: "PRIDE YOUR SeLFF" ===
The ninth annual Korea Queer Film Festival was held in 2009 from June 3 to 7 at the “Seoul Art Cinema (Hollywood Theater)” (서울아트시네마 (허리우드극장)) in Jongno-Gu in Seoul. The 2009 festival featured 29 films from 13 countries (the U.S., UK, Taiwan, Germany, Italy, France, Spain, Japan, Mexico, Israel, Thailand, Norway, and Australia).

=== 2010: "L(Lively) G(Gay) B(Beautiful) T(Tasty) Going!" ===
The tenth annual Korea Queer Film Festival was held in 2010 from June 4 to 8 at the “Seoul Art Cinema (Hollywood Theater)” (서울아트시네마 (허리우드극장)) in Jongno-Gu in Seoul. The 2010 festival featured 16 films from 6 countries (the U.S., USA, Argentina, Peru, France, and Korea).

=== 2011: "너의 색을 밝혀라! Color of your SeLFF" ===
The eleventh annual Korea Queer Film Festival was held in 2011 from June 2 to 8 at the “Seoul Art Cinema (Hollywood Theater)” (서울아트시네마 (허리우드극장)) in Jongno-Gu in Seoul. The 2011 festival featured 2 films from 2 countries (Korea and the U.S.).

== See also ==
- List of LGBT film festivals
