= Yeouinaru station =

Station of the Seoul Metropolitan Subway

Coordinates: 37°31′37.4″N 126°55′58.1″E

여의나루 (유진투자증권); Yeouinaru (Eugene Securities)
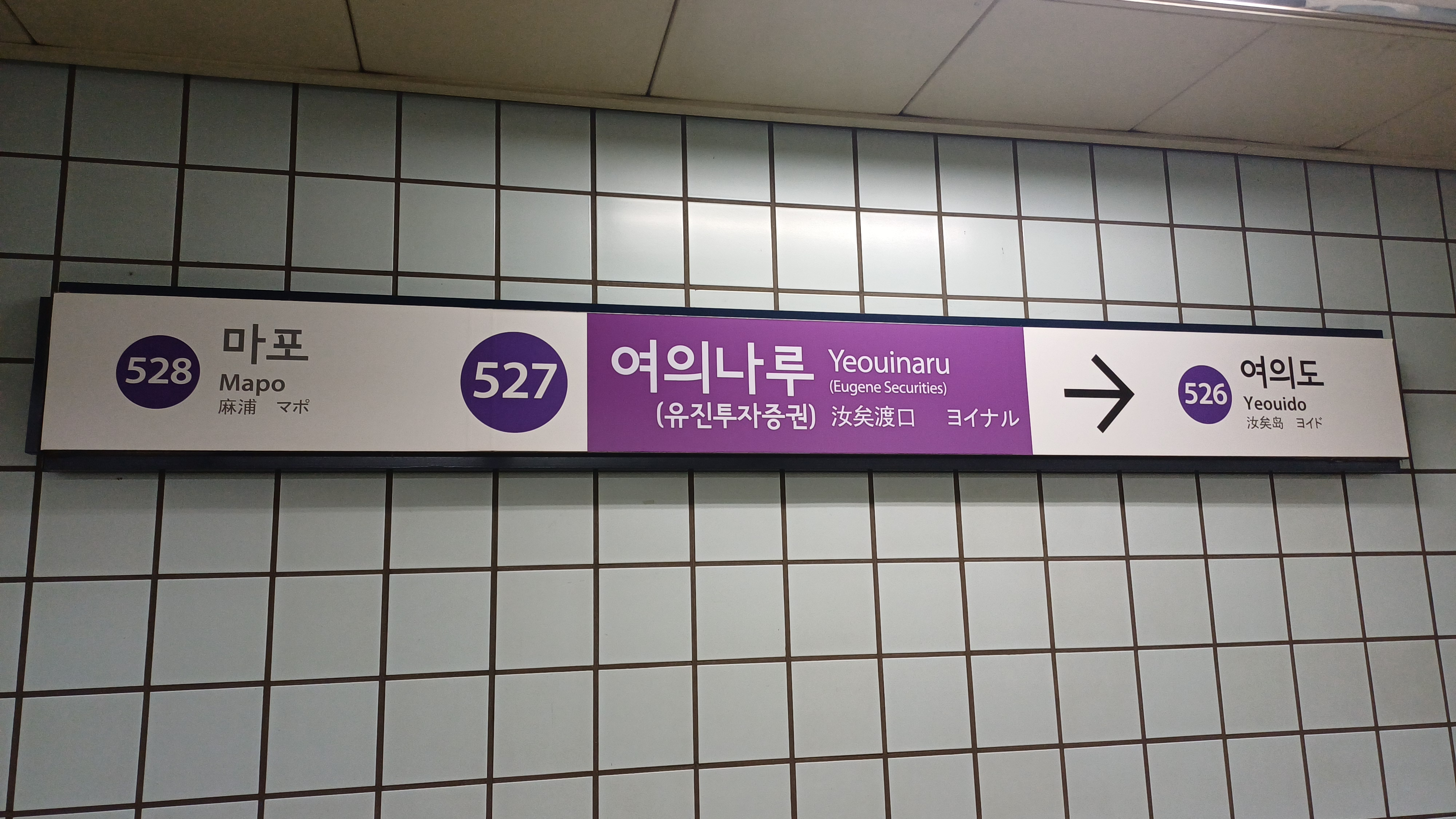
- Station nameplate in June 2025

Korean name
- Hangul: 여의나루역
- Hanja: 汝矣나루驛
- Revised Romanization: Yeouinaru-yeok
- McCune–Reischauer: Yŏŭinaru-yŏk

General information
- Location: 84-4 Yeouido-dong, 343 Yeouidongno Jiha, Yeongdeungpo-gu, Seoul
- Operator: Seoul Metro
- Line: Line 5
- Platforms: 1
- Tracks: 2

Construction
- Structure type: Underground

History
- Opened: December 30, 1996

Services
Preceding station	Seoul Metropolitan Subway	Following station
Yeouido towards Banghwa	Line 5	Mapo towards Hanam Geomdansan or Macheon
Location

Yeouinaru station (Korean: 여의나루역) is a station on the Seoul Subway Line 5. Because of having to cross the Han River by a deep tunnel and not by a rail bridge, it is the deepest train station in South Korea with a depth of 27.5 metres (90 ft) below sea level.

== Station layout ==
G	Street level	Exit

L1; Concourse	Lobby	Customer Service, Shops, Vending machines, ATMs

L2; Platform	Westbound	← Line 5 toward Banghwa (Yeouido)
L2; Platform	Island platform, doors will open on the left
L2; Platform	Eastbound	Line 5 toward Hanam Geomdansan or Macheon (Mapo)→

== Vicinity ==
- Exit 1 : Yeouido Park, KBS
- Exit 2 : Mapo Bridge (south end)
- Exit 3 : Wonhyo Bridge (south end)
- Exit 4 : Yeouido Elementary, Middle, High and Girls' High Schools
