= Seoul Lantern Festival =

Annual festival in South Korea

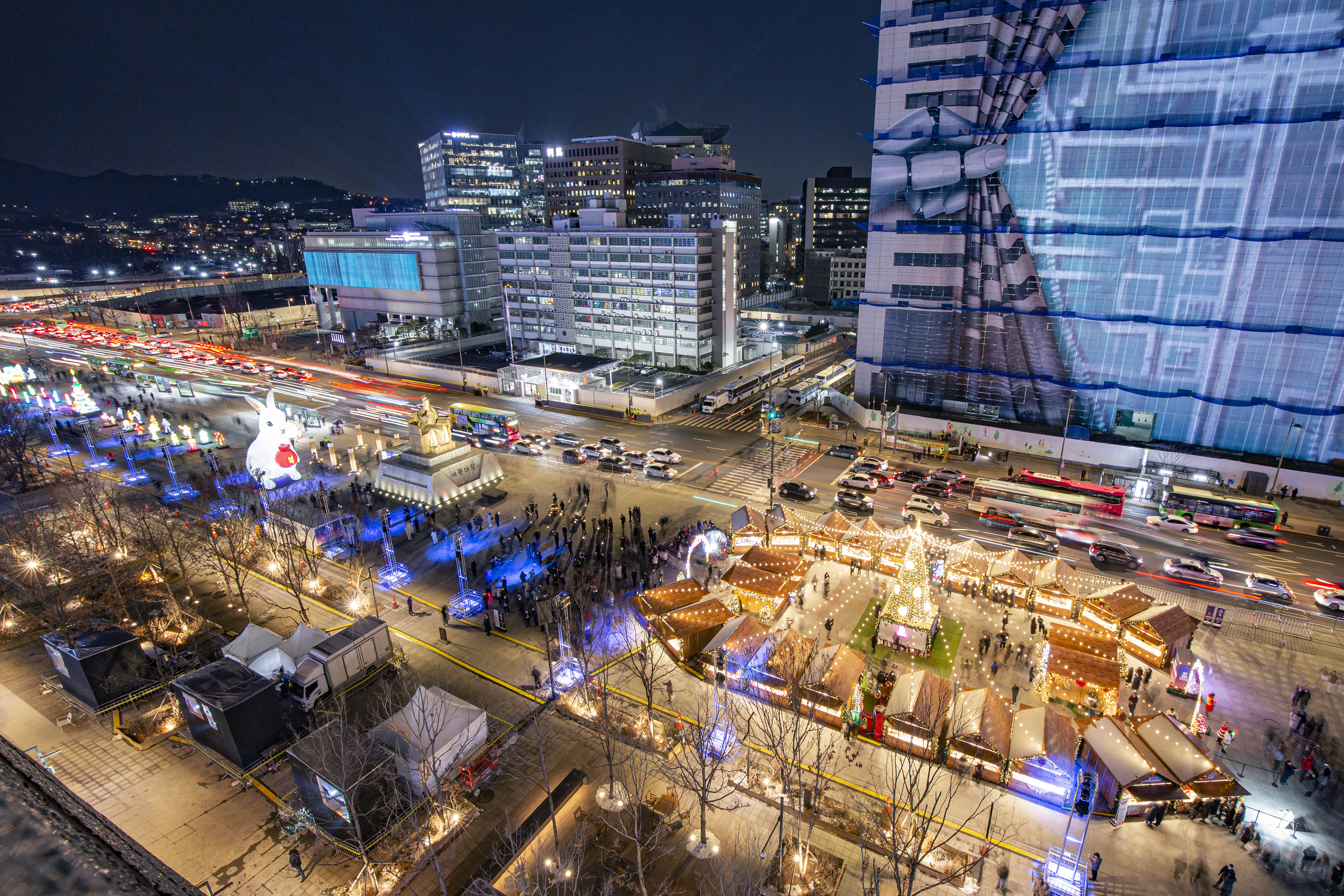
- Seoul Lantern Festival
- Genre: Exhibition
- Frequency: Annual
- Location: Seoul
- Years active: 17
- Inaugurated: 2009
- Attendance: 1.3 million (2022)
- Patron: Seoul Tourism Organization
- Website: stolantern.com

The Seoul Lantern Festival is a festival held every winter in Seoul in South Korea. It includes lanterns, outdoor light installations, Christmas market, experience programs.

This event used to take place about two weeks in November at Cheonggyecheon stream, but since 2022 it started to take place more than a month in December at yes the Gwanghwamun Plaza.

== History ==
The Seoul Lantern Festival started in 2009. The Seoul Lantern Festival started in 2009. In its earlier years, the festival was generally held in November along Cheonggyecheon Stream. In recent editions, it has taken place during the winter holiday season, with the 2025 festival running from 12 December 2025 to 4 January 2026.

== Program ==
Seoul Lantern Festival offers different concepts of festival every year.

=== 2009 ===
The first Seoul Lantern Festival celebrated the 'Visit Korea Year 2010 to 2012' for 5 days. The festival had four themes that were related to 'ryu' Korean.

- Theme 1: Gyoryu zone (Exchange zone)
- Theme 2: Wonryu zone (Headwaters zone)
- Theme 3: Hanryu zone (Korean wave zone)
- Theme 4: Ilryu zone (First-class zone)

=== 2010 ===
The second Seoul Lantern Festival drew 2.3 million visitors, including about 370,000 foreign tourists. The festival's paper lanterns were from 24 countries including Korea, Japan, China, Taiwan, the Philippines, Hong Kong, Singapore, New Zealand and Malaysia. The festival was originally planned for 10 days, but public pressure, largely from the foreign tourists, convinced the organisers to extend the festival by seven additional days.

- Theme : Seoul, the forest of the glimmer of hope.

=== 2011 ===
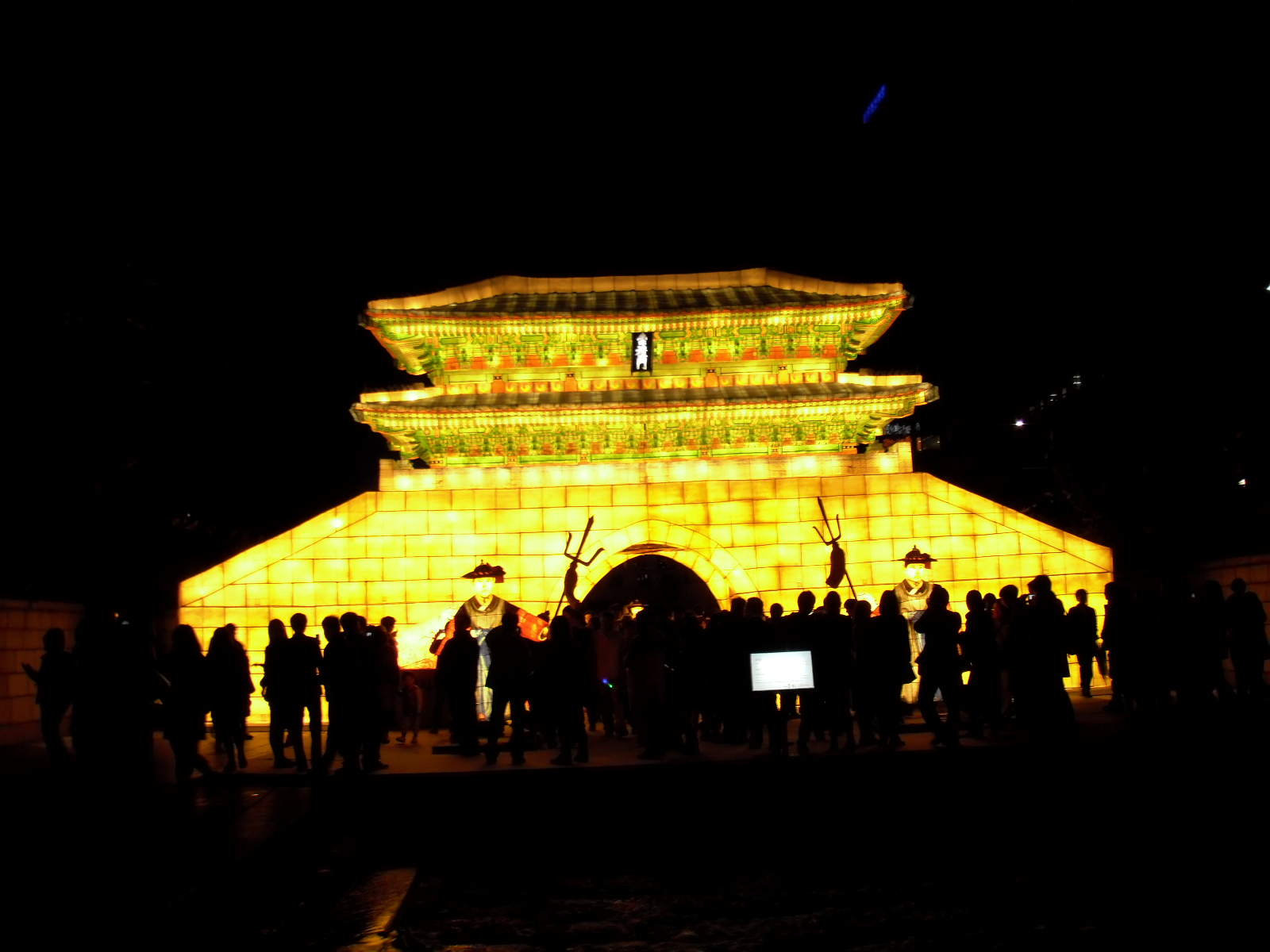
Seoul Lantern Festival in 2011

The main theme of the 2011 festival was 'The History of Seoul by Lanterns' (alternately, '...Told with Light'; literally 'An Old Story of Seoul with Lantern'). Lantern art was used to tell the history of Korea from the Joseon Dynasty through modern times, with special attention to the stories told for Children.

- Theme 1: History of Korea
- Theme 2: Memory of the childhood
- Theme 3: Characters for children

=== 2012 ===
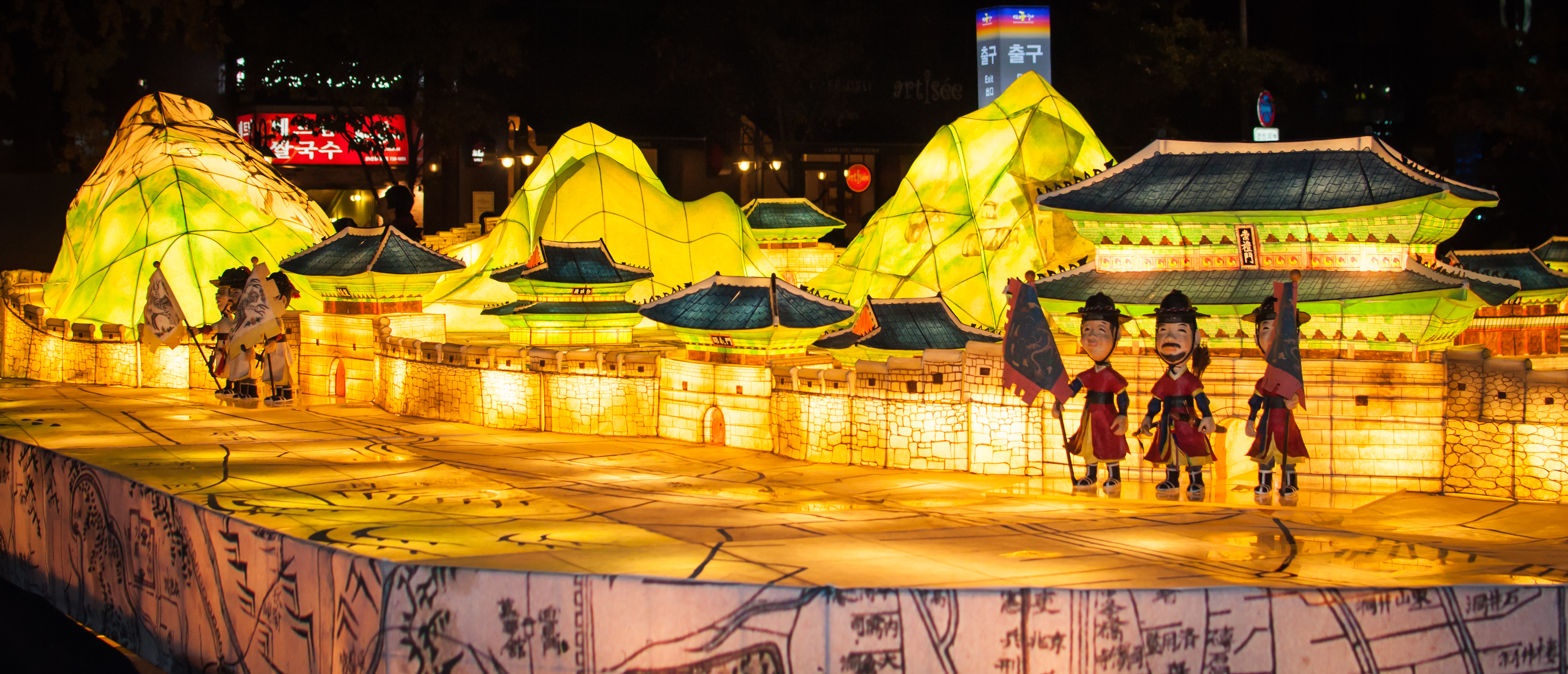
Seoul Lantern Festival in 2012

'The Roots of Seoul, the Life of Ancestors'. was the theme for 2012, once again running a total of 17 days with lanterns illuminated from 5:00 PM to 11:00 PM. Highlighting the design, colour and exotic atmosphere created by lanterns, the overall display extended to over 1.5 kilometres (0.93 mi) and included over 35,000 lights from around Korea (including Suncheon, Namwon, Uiryeong, Inje, Yeongju and Yeongwol, among others) as well as Japan, the Philippines and Singapore.

- Theme 1: Fortress Wall of Seoul
- Theme 2: The story of ancestors who lead Joseon about 200 years
- Theme 3: Life of the people of Joseon
- Theme 4: Opened Seoul

=== 2013 ===
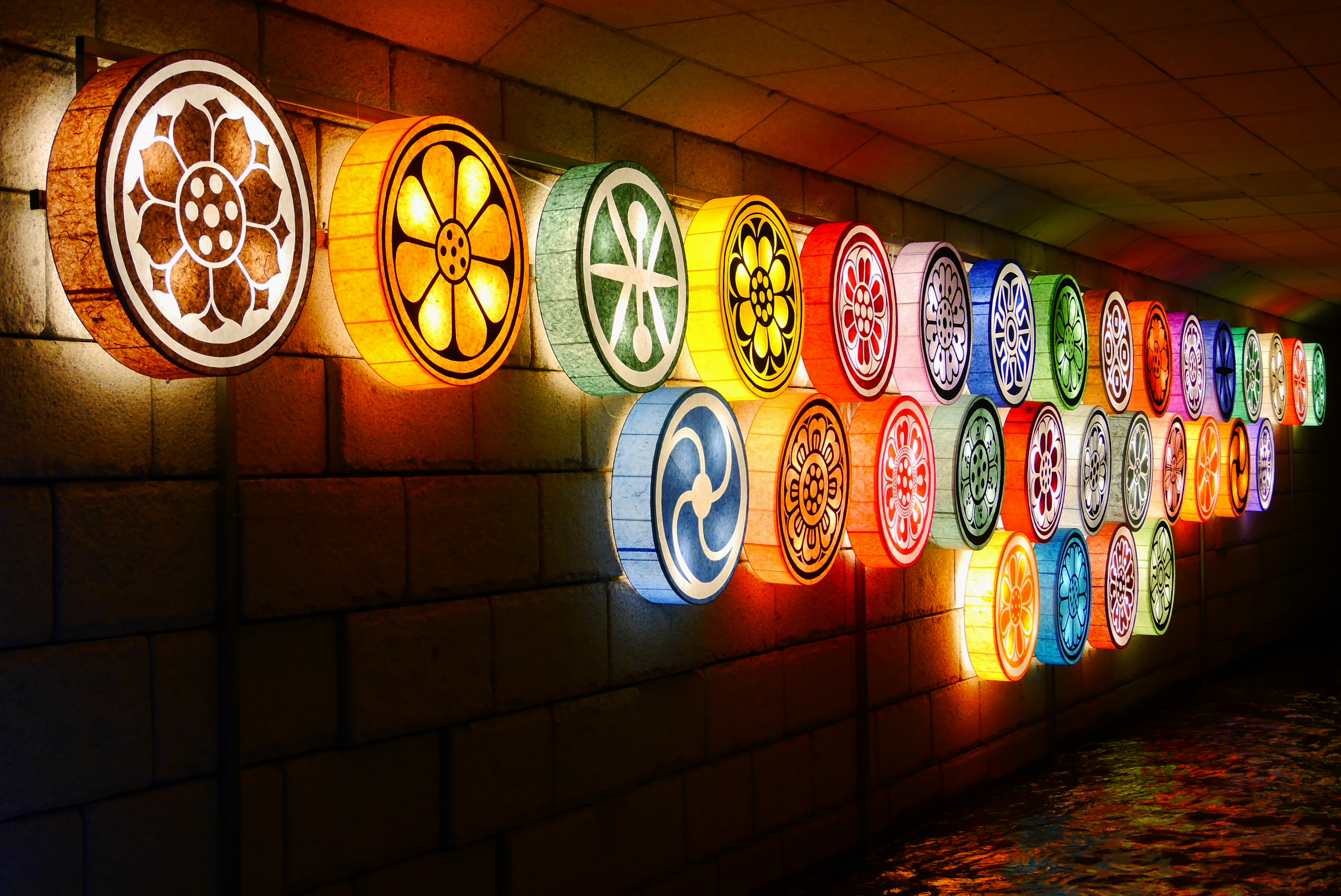
Prayer wheels at the festival in 2013

This fifth Seoul Lantern Festival opened on 1 November to 11 November with a main theme of 'Millennial dream of Hanseong Baekje'. During this festival, visitors could make hanji lanterns, watch musical performances and enjoy other entertainments and events along Cheonggye Plaza and other Seoul sites. A modern lantern in the form of a falcon symbolized the lionhearted Baekje, one of the Three Kingdoms of Korea, and an opening musical performance and parade was based on the life of Geunchogo of Baekje who oversaw the apex of that kingdom.

- Theme 1: 500 years of Hanseong Baekje
- Theme 2: Woongjin(Gongju) Baekje Period
- Theme 3: Buyeo Baekje Period
- Theme 4: The harmony, spirit of Baekje

=== 2014 ===
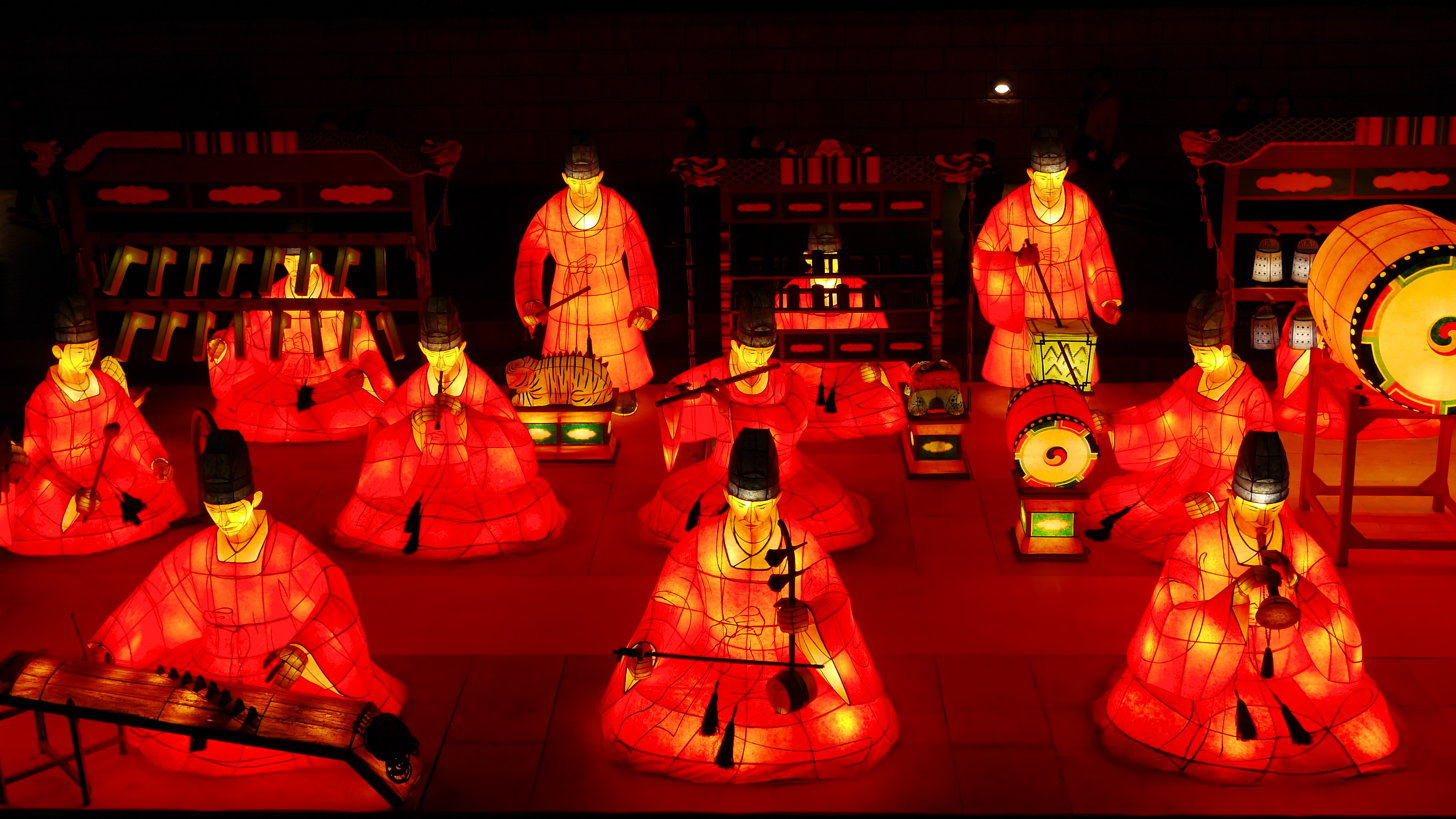
Seoul Lantern Festival 2014

The Seoul Lantern Festival changed its Korean name in 2014 to the Seoul Bitchorong Festival, but there was no change to the name in English. According to the organizing committee, it has changed the Korean name because the festival has expanded to be a combination of traditional lanterns and modern lights like LEDs. It has opened from Cheonggye Plaza to Supyogyo(Bridge) about 1.2 km and displayed about 30,000 light bulbs and about 300 lanterns of 58 lantern light arts. Moreover, the wish tree that is displayed at Kwangtong Bridge was 8 m high and it contained the wishes of Seoul citizens and foreign visitors. As a result, about 3.14 million visitors enjoyed the Seoul Lantern Festival 2014. The total visitors rate has increased 25% from the year before. The largest number of visitors enjoyed the Seoul Lantern Festival 2014.

Total foreign visitors are about 630,000 and this rate has increased 16% from the year before.

- Theme 1: Wonderful world heritage of Seoul
- Theme 2: Invitation from local government and foreign country
- Theme 3: Famous characters
- Theme 4: Light Arts

=== 2015 ===
- Theme 1: Amazing World heritage in Seoul
- Theme 2: From local governments and overseas invitation
- Theme 3: Corporation and the character
- Theme 4: Light Art author show

=== 2022 ===
- Theme 1: Sea of courage
- Theme 2: The light of Companionship
- Theme 3: Garden of Light
- Theme 4: My Soul Seoul

=== 2024 ===
The 2024 Seoul Lantern Festival was held from 13 December 2024 to 31 January 2025 along Cheonggyecheon Stream, between Cheonggye Plaza and Samilgyo Bridge. Its theme was "SOUL LANTERN: Play with the Light of Seoul", and the event featured more than 200 light installations.

=== 2025 ===
The 2025 Seoul Lantern Festival began on 12 December 2025 at Cheonggyecheon Stream and Uicheon Stream. Originally scheduled to end on 4 January 2026, the festival was extended until 18 January along the main Cheonggyecheon section, while the Uicheon section and the Cheonggyecheon section near Ogansugyo Bridge closed on 4 January. Under the theme "My Light, Our Dream, the Magic of Seoul", the Cheonggyecheon displays were organized into four themed sections: Miracle Seoul, Golden Secret, Dream Light, and Seoul Fantasia.

== Location ==
The festival's venues have varied by year. In 2024, it took place along Cheonggyecheon Stream between Cheonggye Plaza and Samilgyo Bridge. In 2025, it was held along Cheonggyecheon Stream and Uicheon Stream.

=== By subway ===
- Line 1 and 2 City Hall Station, exit 4 and 5
- Line 5 Line Gwanghwamun Station, exit 5 and 9
- Line 1 Jonggak Station, exit 1, 5 and 6
- Line 2 Euljiro 1(il)-ga Station, exit 1–1

== Criticism ==
The Seoul Lantern Festival was organized just in time to celebrate the 'Visit Korea Year 2010 to 2012'. It was decided to hold the Seoul Lantern Festival annually, and in response the city of Jinju criticized the festival severely. They said that the Seoul Lantern Festival was a copy of their Jinju Namgang Yudeng Festival, which itself is annual and had begun earlier, in 2000. It had been started in that year as a public requiem, and also as an occasion for a Korean prayer rite in honour of about 70,000 soldiers and civilians who had died in the historic second battle at Jinju Castle in 1593. More than 20 Jinju associations asked for the Seoul Lantern Festival to be discontinued. There was a one-man protest in front of the Seoul city hall and an assembly at the Seoul station. As a result, the city of Seoul and the city of Jinju agreed to change the Korean name of the Seoul Lantern Festival, and thus differentiated the Seoul Lantern Festival from the Jinju Namgang Yudeng Festival.
