= Jinju Namgang Yudeung Festival =

Annual festival in Jinju, South Korea

Jinju Namgang Yudeung Festival 진주남강유등축제
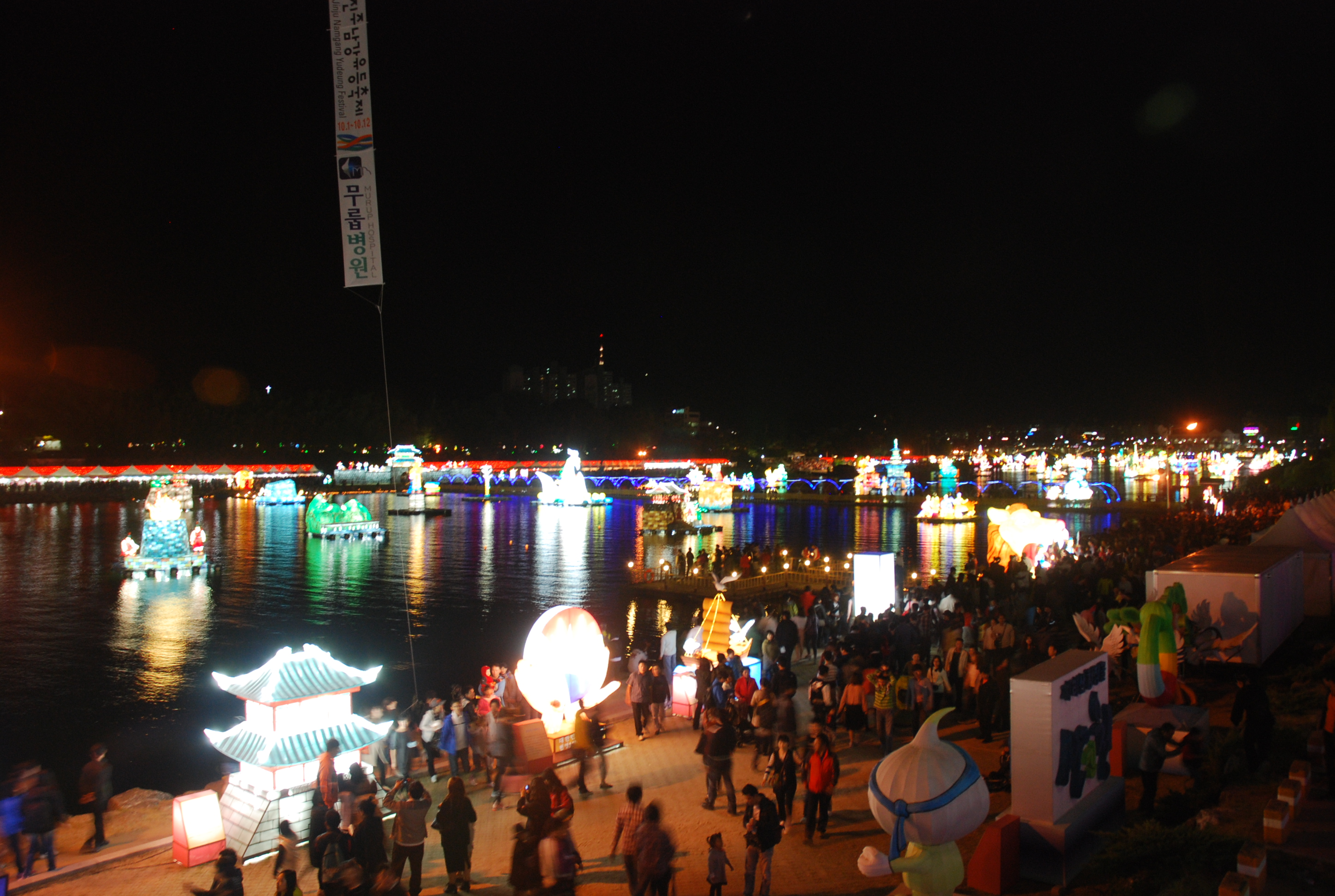
- Lantern boats floating on Nam River
- Date: October
- Locations: Nam River, Jinju
- Inaugurated: 2002
- Organiser: Jinju
- Sponsor: Ministry of Culture, Sports and Tourism
- Website: yudeung.com

The Jinju Namgang Yudeung Festival (Korean: 진주남강유등축제) is a festival held annually in October in Jinju, South Gyeongsang Province, South Korea. With its roots from the Siege of Jinju in 1592 and 1593, the festival was officially established in 2002.

== Origin ==
The Jinju Namgang Yudeung Festival originated from floating lanterns on Nam River during the Siege of Jinju in the Imjin War. The 1592 Siege of Jinju took place over six days, beginning with the Japanese invasion, followed by the united resistance of Korean civilians, militia, and government, culminating in Korea's victory and the death of Kim Simin. During the 1593 Siege of Jinju, Japan reinvaded Korea and Korea lost the war, leading to Nongae's revenge and her subsequent death. During the war, lanterns were used for military operations and to facilitate communication between those inside and outside the fortress. After the war, they were used to commemorate the spirits of those who lost their lives.

== History ==
Originally a lantern-floating event at the Gaecheon Arts Festival, it became a separate festival in 2002. It was designated as Preparatory Festival (예비축제) in 2003, Developing Festival (육성축제) in 2004, and Excellent Festival (우수축제) in 2005. It was selected as Best Festival (최우수축제) from 2006 to 2009, although it was canceled in 2009 due to the 2009 influenza outbreak. In 2010 and 2011, it was selected as the Representative Festival of Korea (대한민국 대표축제) by the Ministry of Culture, Sports and Tourism. In October 2011, it won three gold awards and one bronze award at the Pinnacle Awards hosted by the International Festivals and Events Association. From 2015 to 2019, it was selected as Global Festival of Korea (대한민국 글로벌축제).

== Events ==
The main event is floating lantern display. Visitors can also enjoy busking, making wish lanterns, and riding a cruise. Jinju Food Grand Party and local agricultural market also take place.

== Gallery ==
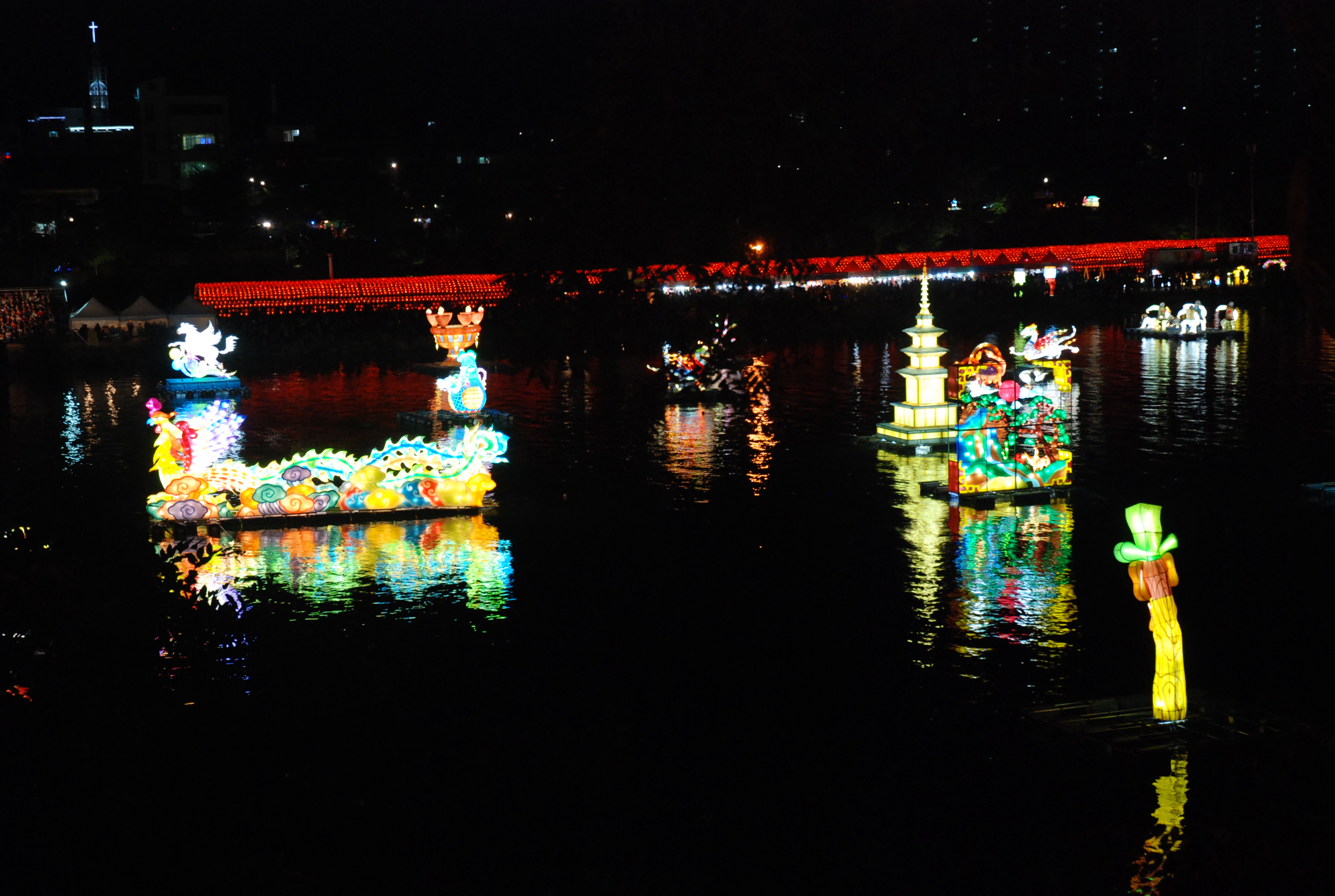
Lanterns on Nam River

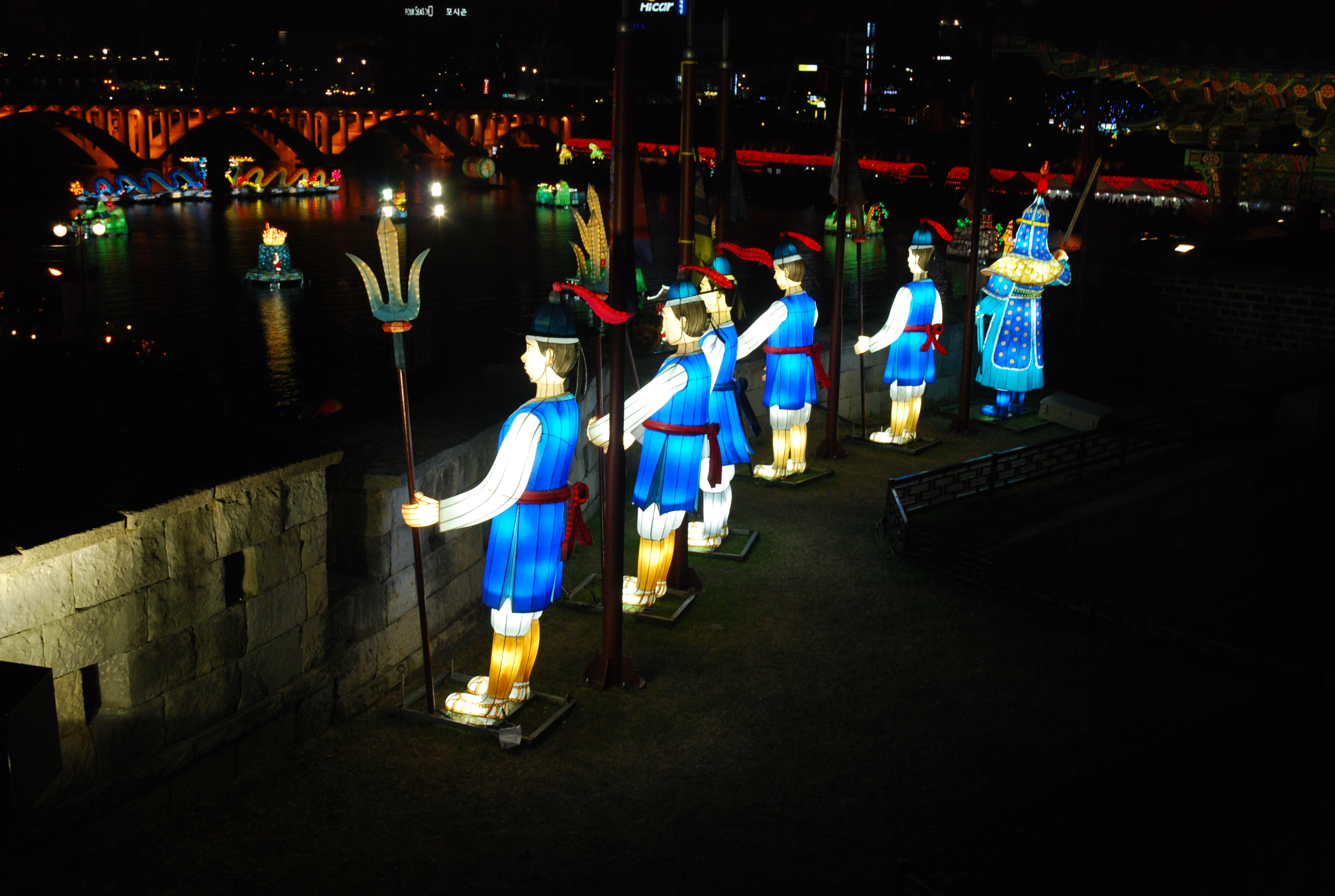
Jinju Castle wall during the festival

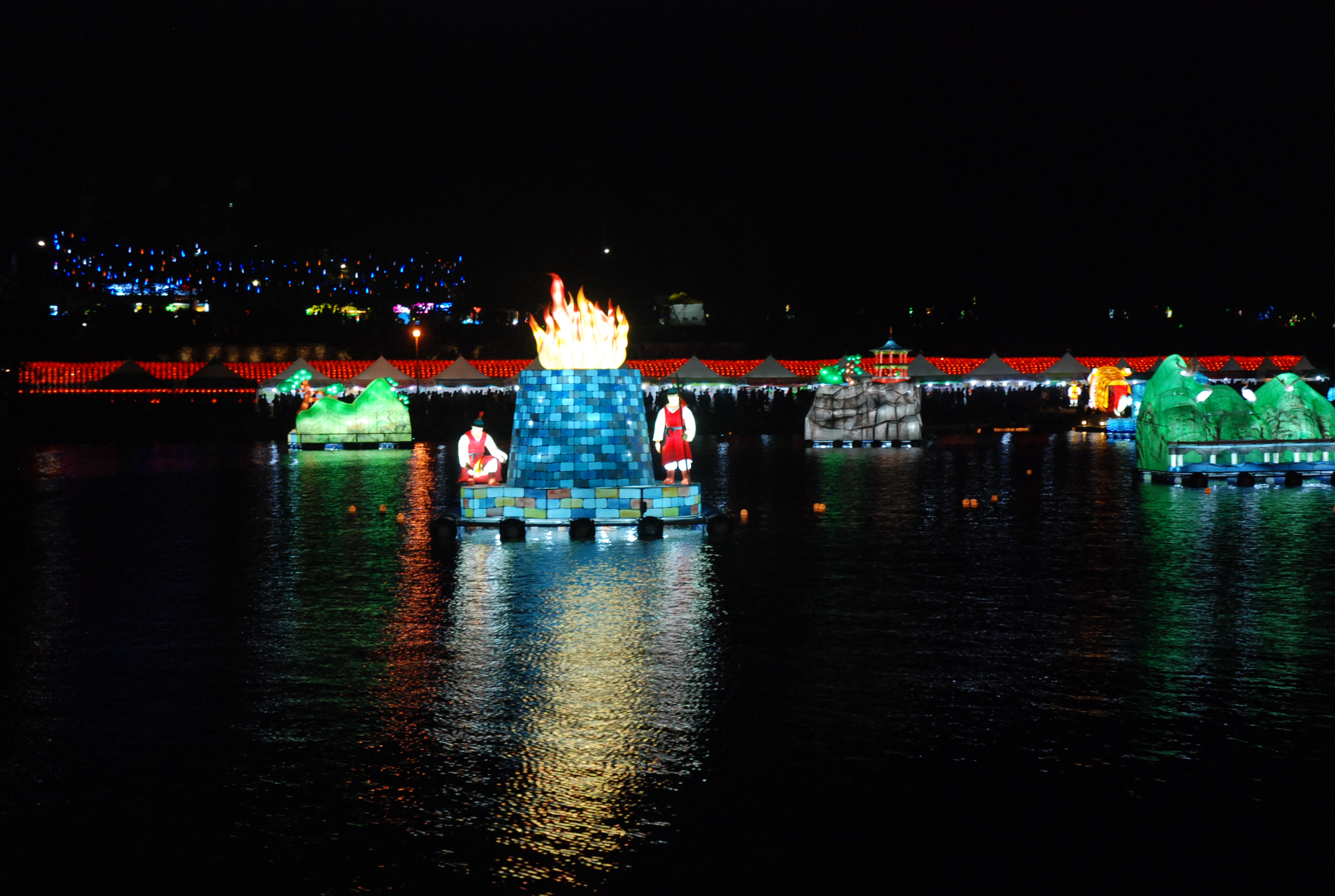
Beacon mound lantern in Jinju Castle

== External link ==
- Media related to Jinju Namgang Yudeung Festival at Wikimedia Commons
