= Misa station =

Metro station in Hanam city, Gyeonggi-do, South Korea

미사; Misa
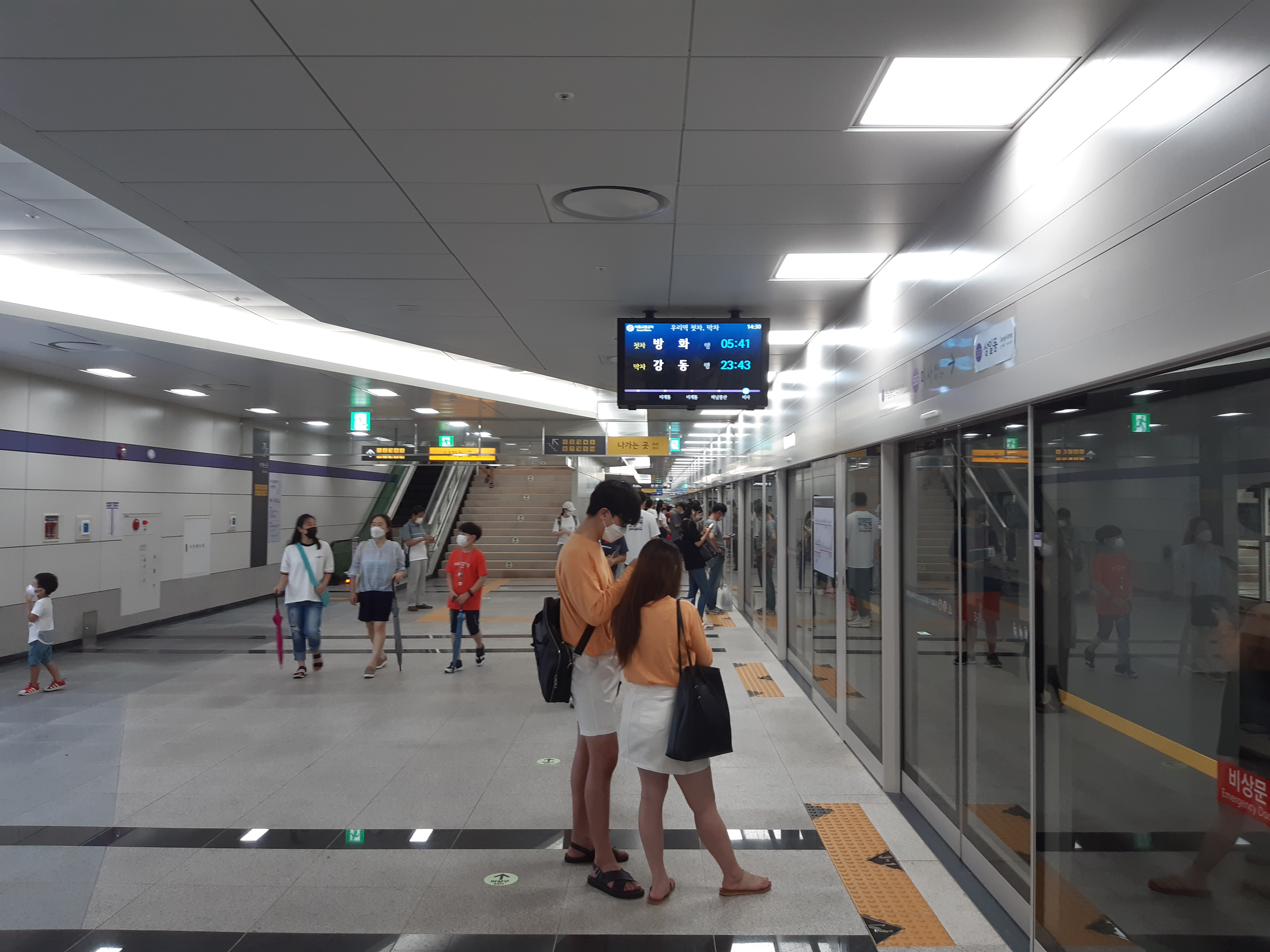

Korean name
- Hangul: 미사역
- Hanja: 渼沙驛
- RR: Misa-yeok
- MR: Misa-yŏk

General information
- Location: 90 Misagangbyeondong-ro Jiha, Hanam-si, Gyeonggi-do
- Coordinates: 37°33′47″N 127°11′34″E
- Operator: Seoul Metro
- Line: Line 5
- Platforms: 2
- Tracks: 2

Construction
- Structure type: Underground

History
- Opened: August 8, 2020

Services
Preceding station	Seoul Metropolitan Subway	Following station
Gangil towards Banghwa	Line 5	Hanam Pungsan towards Hanam Geomdansan
Location

Misa Station is a subway station on the Hanam Line of Seoul Subway Line 5 in Hanam-si, Gyeonggi-do.

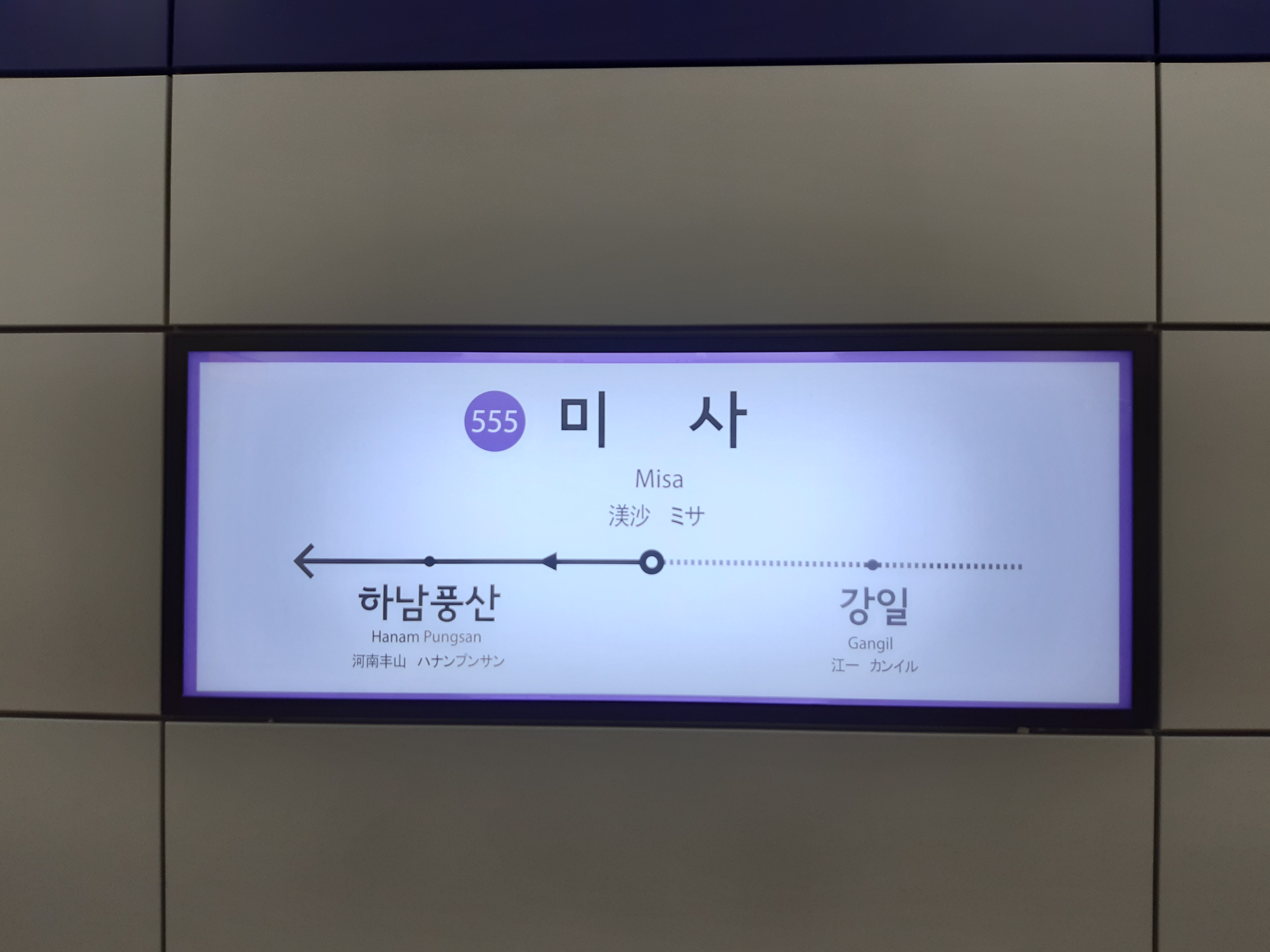

== Station layout ==
G	Street level	Exit

L1; Concourse	Lobby	Customer Service, Shops, Vending machines, ATMs

L2; Platforms	Side platform, doors will open on the right
L2; Platforms	Westbound	← Line 5 toward Banghwa (Gangil)
L2; Platforms	Eastbound	Line 5 toward Hanam Geomdansan (Hanam Pungsan)→
L2; Platforms	Side platform, doors will open on the right
