= Gangil station =

Metro station in Seoul, South Korea

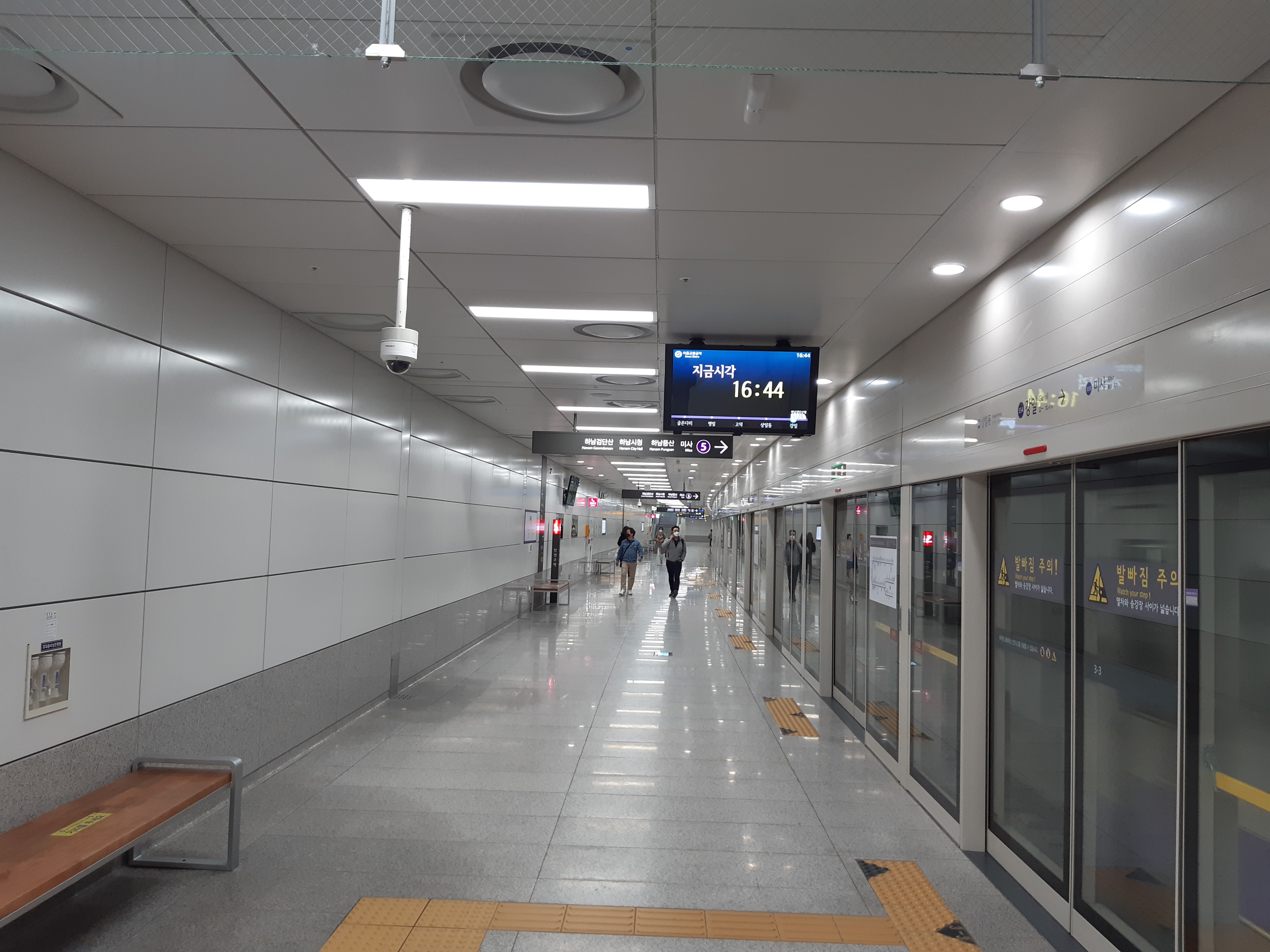

General information
- Location: Gangil-dong, Gangdong-gu, Seoul
- Coordinates: 37°33′27″N 127°10′33″E
- Operated by: Seoul Metro
- Line: Line 5
- Platforms: 2
- Tracks: 2

Construction
- Structure type: Underground

History
- Opened: March 27, 2021

Services
Preceding station	Seoul Metropolitan Subway	Following station
Sangil-dong towards Banghwa	Line 5	Misa towards Hanam Geomdansan
Location

Gangil Station (Korean: 강일역) is a subway station on the Hanam Line of Seoul Subway Line 5, located in Gangdong District, Seoul, South Korea.

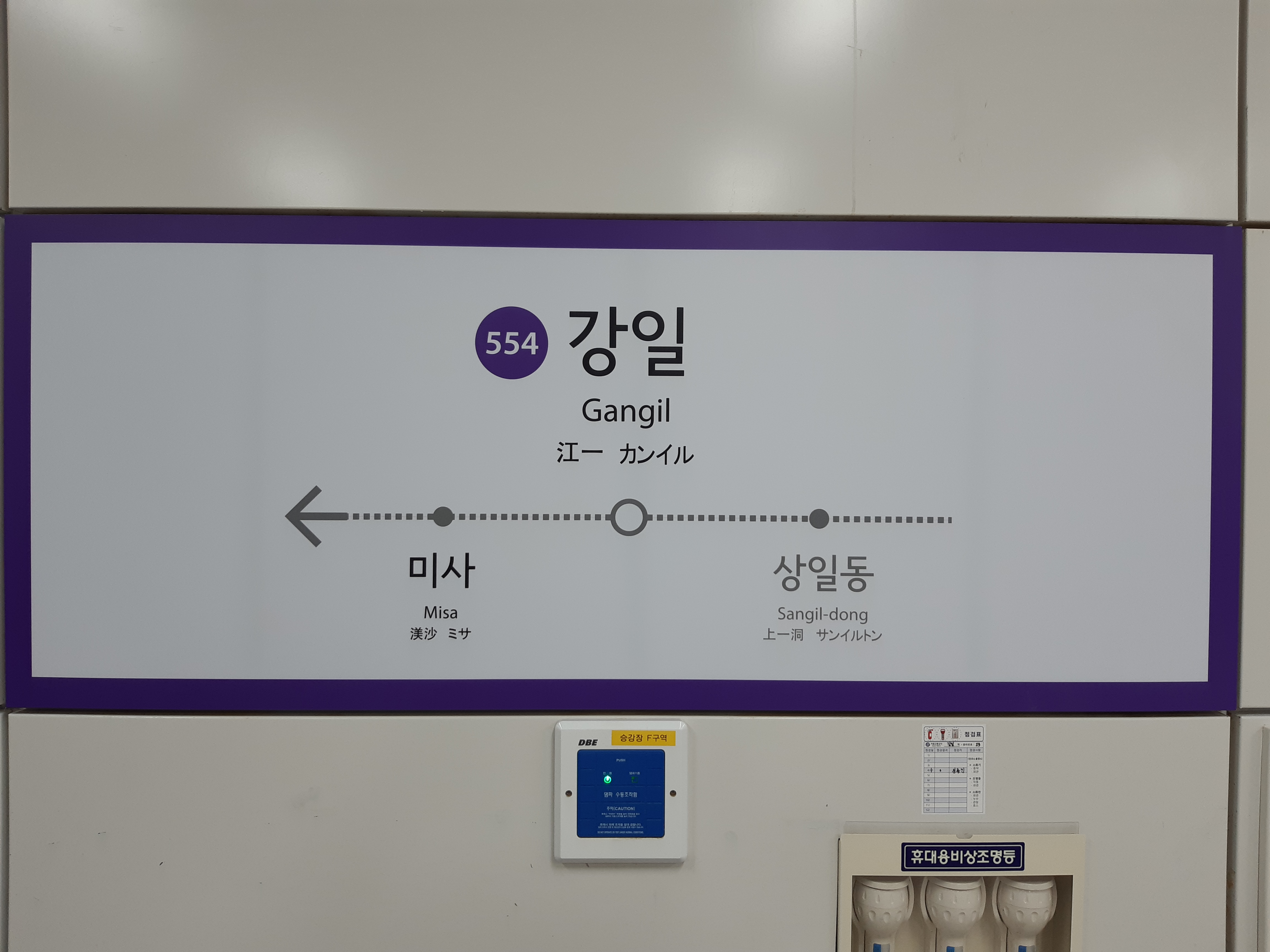

== Station Layout ==
Gangil Station has three levels:

- Street level: Exits - Concourse (L1): Lobby, customer service, shops, vending machines, ATMs - Platforms (L2): Two side platforms with doors that open on the right

=== Platforms ===
- Westbound: Towards Banghwa Station (Sangil-dong) - Eastbound: Towards Hanam Geomdansan Station (Misa)

== History ==
Gangil Station was opened as an infill station as part of the second phase of the extension of Line 5 from Hanam Pungsan to Hanam Geomdansan.
