= Sangil-dong station =

Metro station in South Korea

상일동; Sangil-dong
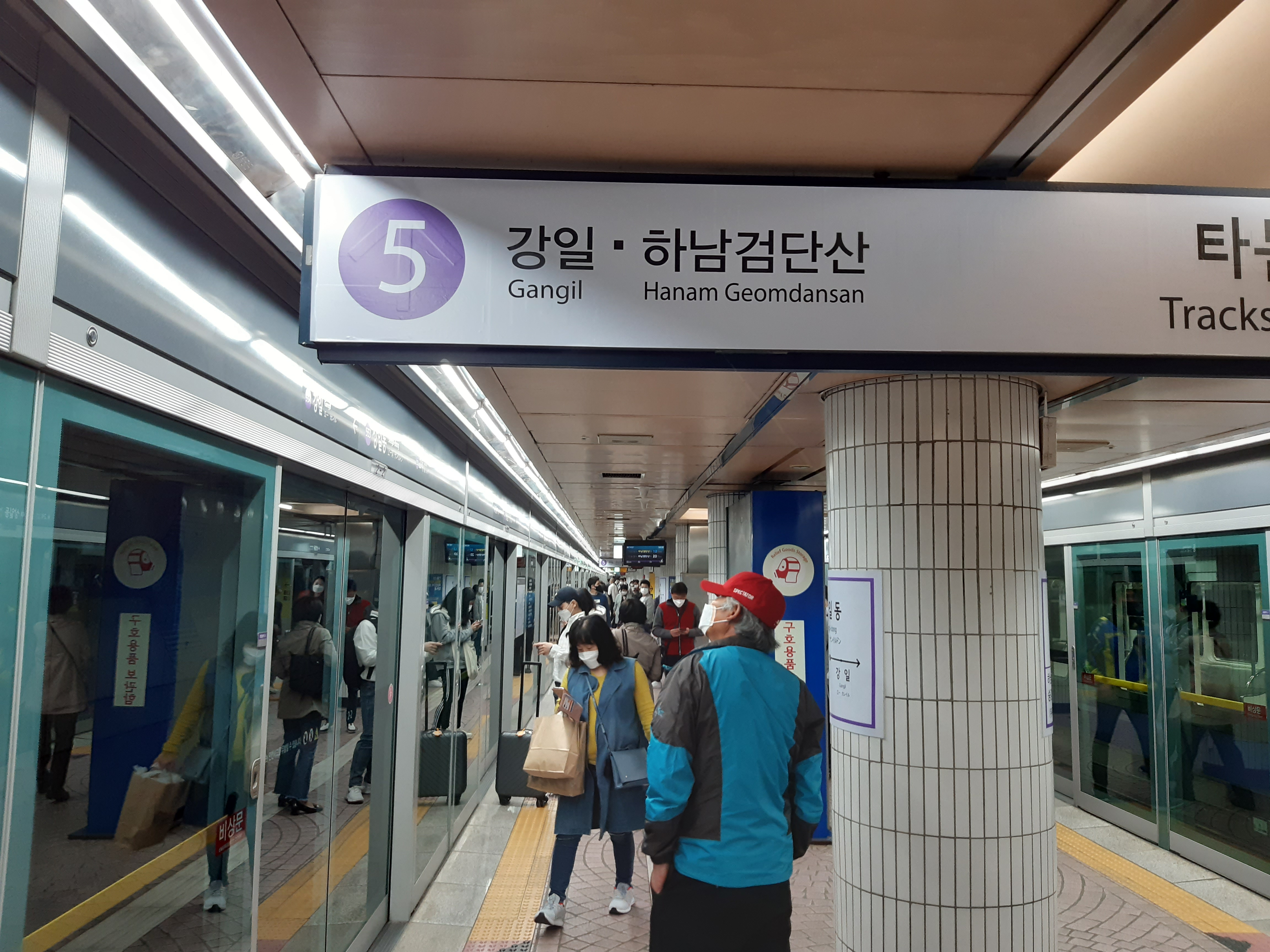

Korean name
- Hangul: 상일동역
- Hanja: 上一洞驛
- Revised Romanization: Sangildong-yeok
- McCune–Reischauer: Sangiltong-yŏk

General information
- Location: 148 Sangil-dong, Gangdong-gu, Seoul
- Coordinates: 37°33′24″N 127°09′57″E
- Operator: Seoul Metro
- Line: Line 5
- Platforms: 2
- Tracks: 3

Construction
- Structure type: Underground

History
- Opened: November 15, 1995

Services
Preceding station	Seoul Metropolitan Subway	Following station
Godeok towards Banghwa	Line 5	Gangil towards Hanam Geomdansan
Location

Sangil-dong station is the subway station of Line 5 in Gangdong-gu, Seoul. Seoul Metro have extended the subway line from this station to Hanam Geomdansan in the nearby city of Hanam.

The South Korean government plans to build a new apartment complex roughly 2 million pyeong in size.

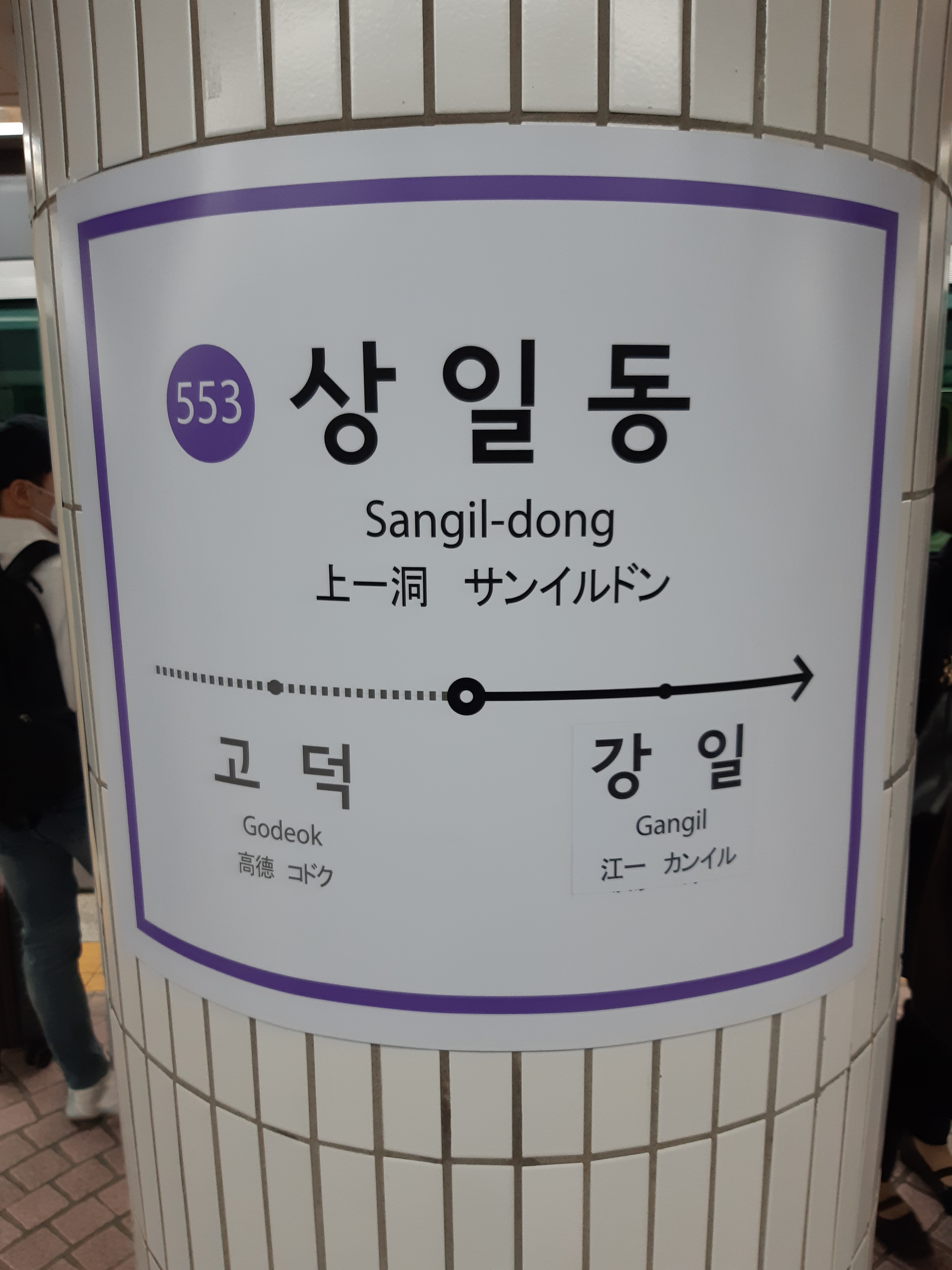

== Station layout ==
G	Street level	Exit

L1; Concourse	Lobby	Customer service, shops, vending machines, ATMs

L2; Platforms	Westbound	← Line 5 toward Banghwa (Godeok)
L2; Platforms	Island platform, doors will open on the left, right
L2; Platforms	Terminating Platform	Line 5 Alighting Passengers Only
L2; Platforms	Island platform, doors will open on the left, right
L2; Platforms	Eastbound	Line 5 toward Hanam Geomdansan (Gangil) →

== Vicinity ==
- Exit 1 : Godeok Lifelong Learning Center, Godeok 2-dong Community Service Center, Jugong Apts. Complex 2, 8
- Exit 2 : Saemaeul Market, Jugong Apts. Complex 2
- Exit 3 : Goil Elementary School, Kodeok Sports Center, Korea Welfare Center for the visually handicapped, Jugong Apts. Complex 3, 5, 6
- Exit 4 : Godeok Post Office, Godeok Police Box, Jugong Apts. Complex 3, 4, 7

== Ridership ==
Station	Figure						
Station	2000	2001	2002	2003	2004	2005	2006
Line 5	9828	10591	10792	10363	9788	9138	8491
