= Hanam Pungsan station =

Metro station in Hanam city, Gyeonggi-do, South Korea

하남풍산; Hanam Pungsan
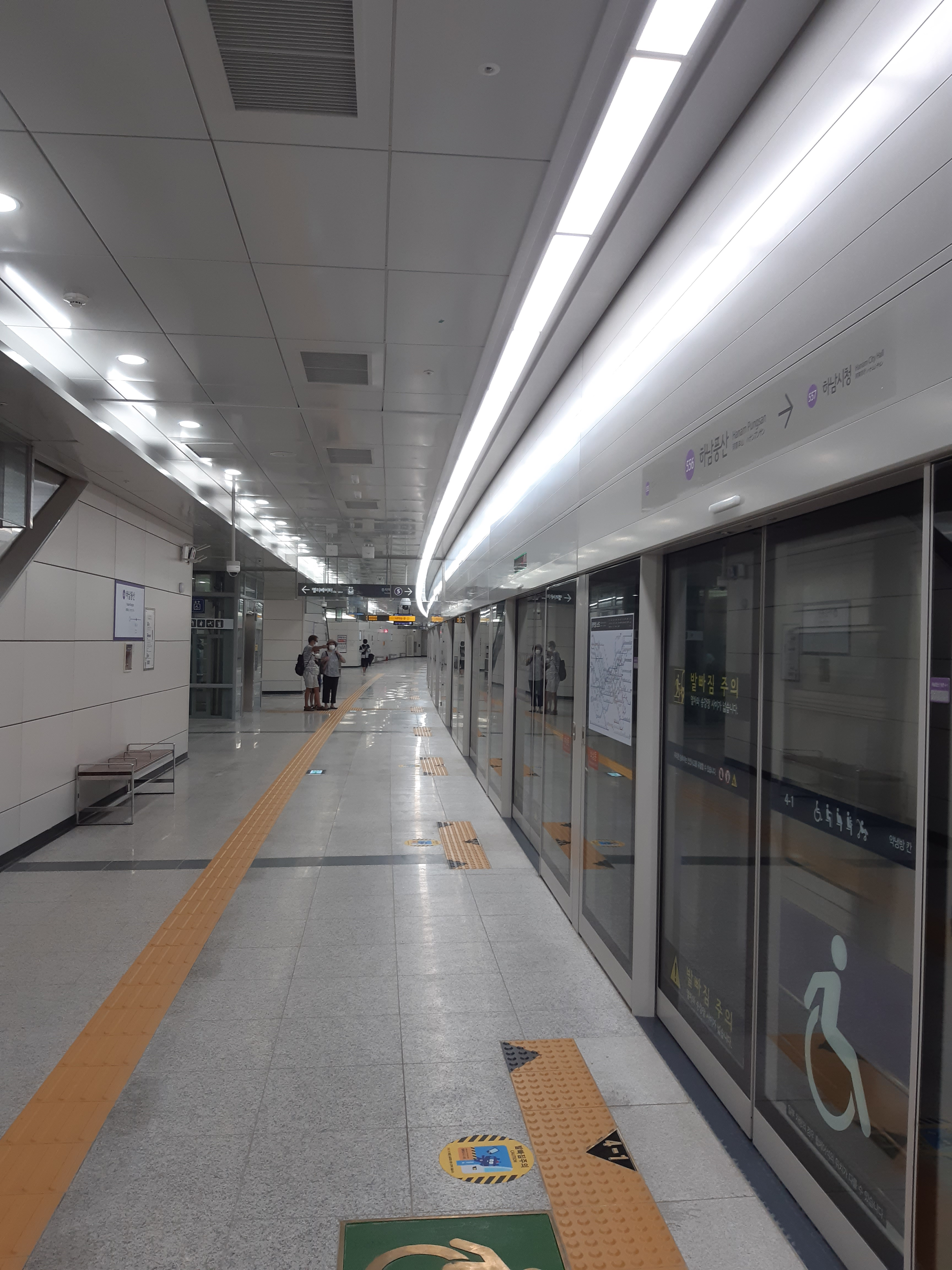

Korean name
- Hangul: 하남풍산역
- Hanja: 河南豊山驛
- RR: Hanam Pungsan-yeok
- MR: Hanam P'ungsan-yŏk

General information
- Location: 50, Deokpungseo-ro Jiha, Hanam-si, Gyeonggi-do
- Coordinates: 37°33′11″N 127°12′17″E
- Operator: Seoul Metro
- Line: Line 5
- Platforms: 2
- Tracks: 2

Construction
- Structure type: Underground

History
- Opened: August 8, 2020

Services
Preceding station	Seoul Metropolitan Subway	Following station
Misa towards Banghwa	Line 5	Hanam City Hall towards Hanam Geomdansan
Location

Hanam Pungsan Station is a subway station on the Hanam Line of Seoul Subway Line 5 in Hanam-si, Gyeonggi-do.

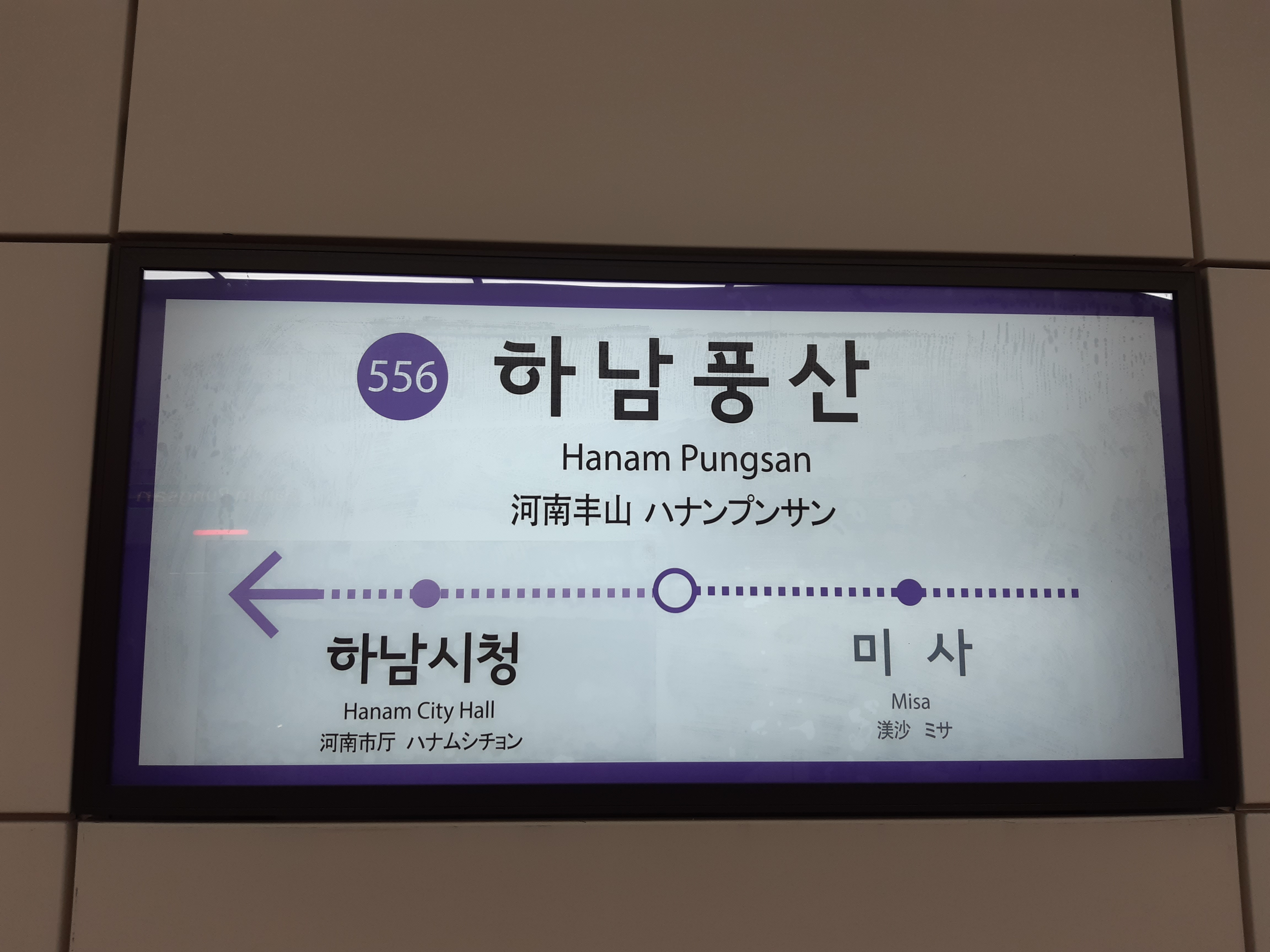

== Station layout ==
G	Street level	Exit

L1; Concourse	Lobby	Customer Service, Shops, Vending machines, ATMs

L2; Platforms	Side platform, doors will open on the right
L2; Platforms	Westbound	← Line 5 toward Banghwa (Misa)
L2; Platforms	Eastbound	Line 5 toward Hanam Geomdansan (Hanam City Hall) →
L2; Platforms	Side platform, doors will open on the right
