= Aeogae station =

Station of the Seoul Metropolitan Subway

Coordinates: 37°33′12.4″N 126°57′24″E

애오개; Aeogae
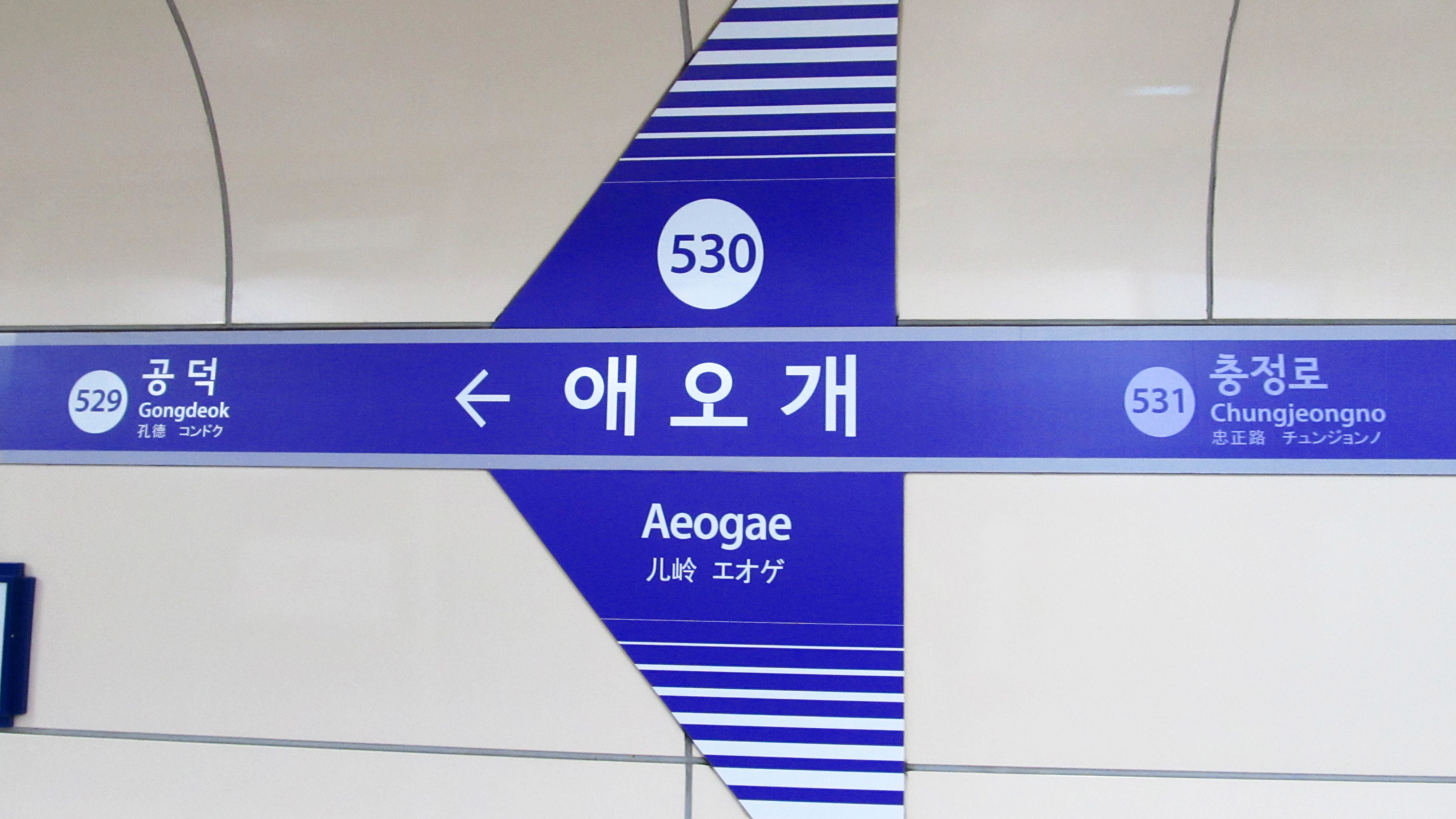
- Station nameplate

Korean name
- Hangul: 애오개역
- Hanja: 애오개驛
- Revised Romanization: Aeogae-yeok
- McCune–Reischauer: Aeogae-yŏk

General information
- Location: 210 Mapodaero Jiha, 612 Ahyeon-dong, Mapo-gu, Seoul
- Operator: Seoul Metro
- Line: Line 5
- Platforms: 2
- Tracks: 2

Construction
- Structure type: Underground

History
- Opened: December 30, 1996

Services
Preceding station	Seoul Metropolitan Subway	Following station
Gongdeok towards Banghwa	Line 5	Chungjeongno towards Hanam Geomdansan or Macheon
Location

Aeogae station (Korean: 애오개; lit. 'Small ridge') is a subway station on Line 5 of the Seoul Metropolitan Subway. The station is located in the Ahyeon neighborhood of Mapo District, Seoul. The name Aeogae is notable for being one of the few station names in the Seoul Metropolitan Subway not derived from Chinese. The station name is derived from a native Korean word meaning "small ridge" and is shared by the neighborhood where the station is located.

== Station layout ==
G	Street level	Exit

L1; Concourse	Lobby	Customer Service, Shops, Vending machines, ATMs

L2; Platforms	Side platform, doors will open on the right
L2; Platforms	Westbound	← Line 5 toward Banghwa (Gongdeok)
L2; Platforms	Eastbound	Line 5 toward Hanam Geomdansan or Macheon (Chungjeongno)→
L2; Platforms	Side platform, doors will open on the right
