= Hanam City Hall station =

Metro station in Hanam city, Gyeonggi-do, South Korea

하남시청 (덕풍·신장); Hanam City Hall (Deokpung & Sinjang)
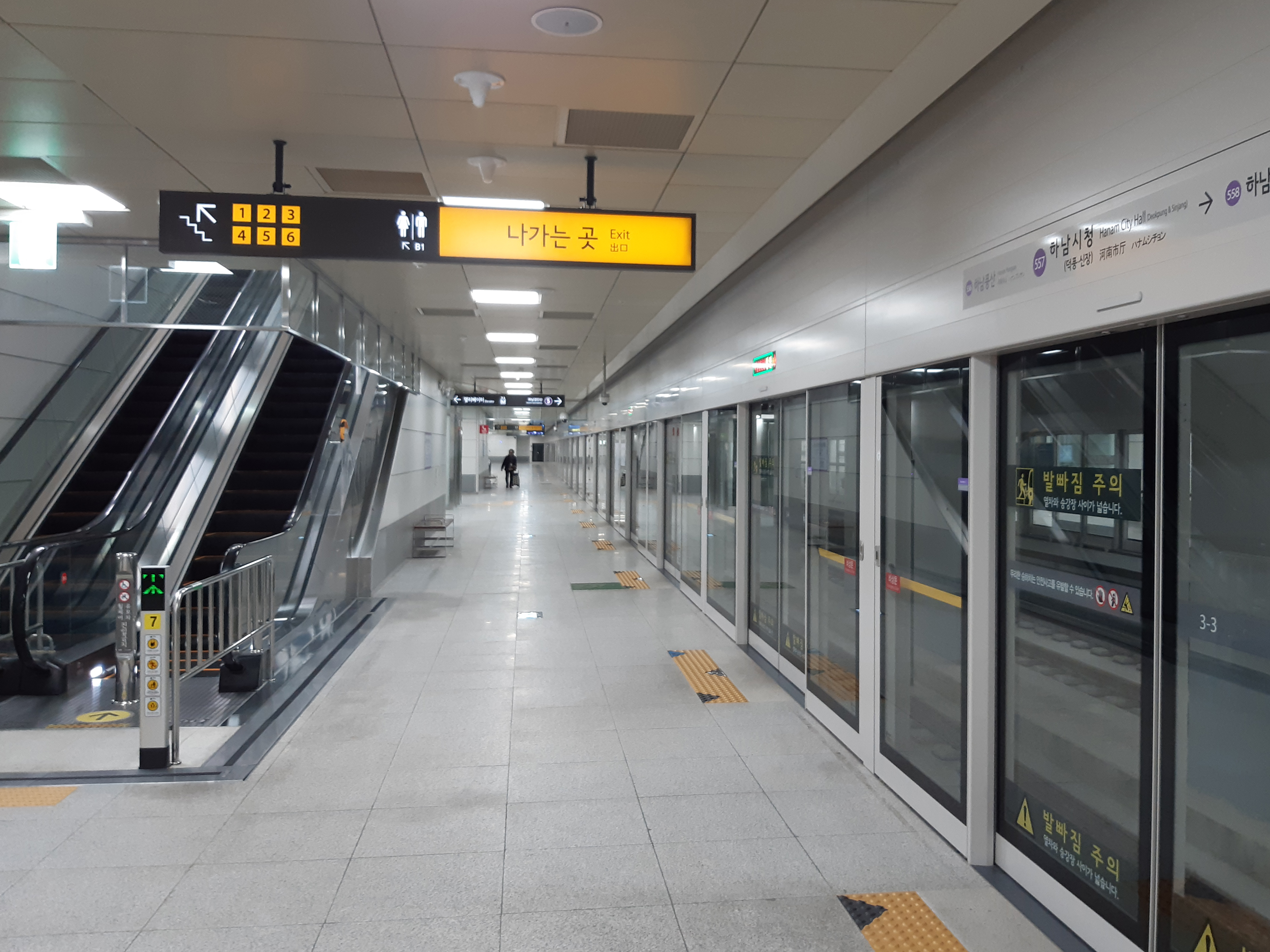

Korean name
- Hangul: 하남시청역
- Hanja: 河南市廳驛
- Revised Romanization: Hanamsicheong-yeok
- McCune–Reischauer: Hanamsich'ŏng-yŏk

General information
- Location: 820, Hanamdaero Jiha, Hanam-si, Gyeonggi-do
- Coordinates: 37°32′30″N 127°12′25″E
- Operated by: Seoul Metro
- Line: Line 5
- Platforms: 2
- Tracks: 2

Construction
- Structure type: Underground

History
- Opened: March 27, 2021

Services
Preceding station	Seoul Metropolitan Subway	Following station
Hanam Pungsan towards Banghwa	Line 5	Hanam Geomdansan Terminus
Location

Hanam City Hall Station is a subway station on the Hanam Line of Seoul Subway Line 5 in Hanam-si, Gyeonggi-do.

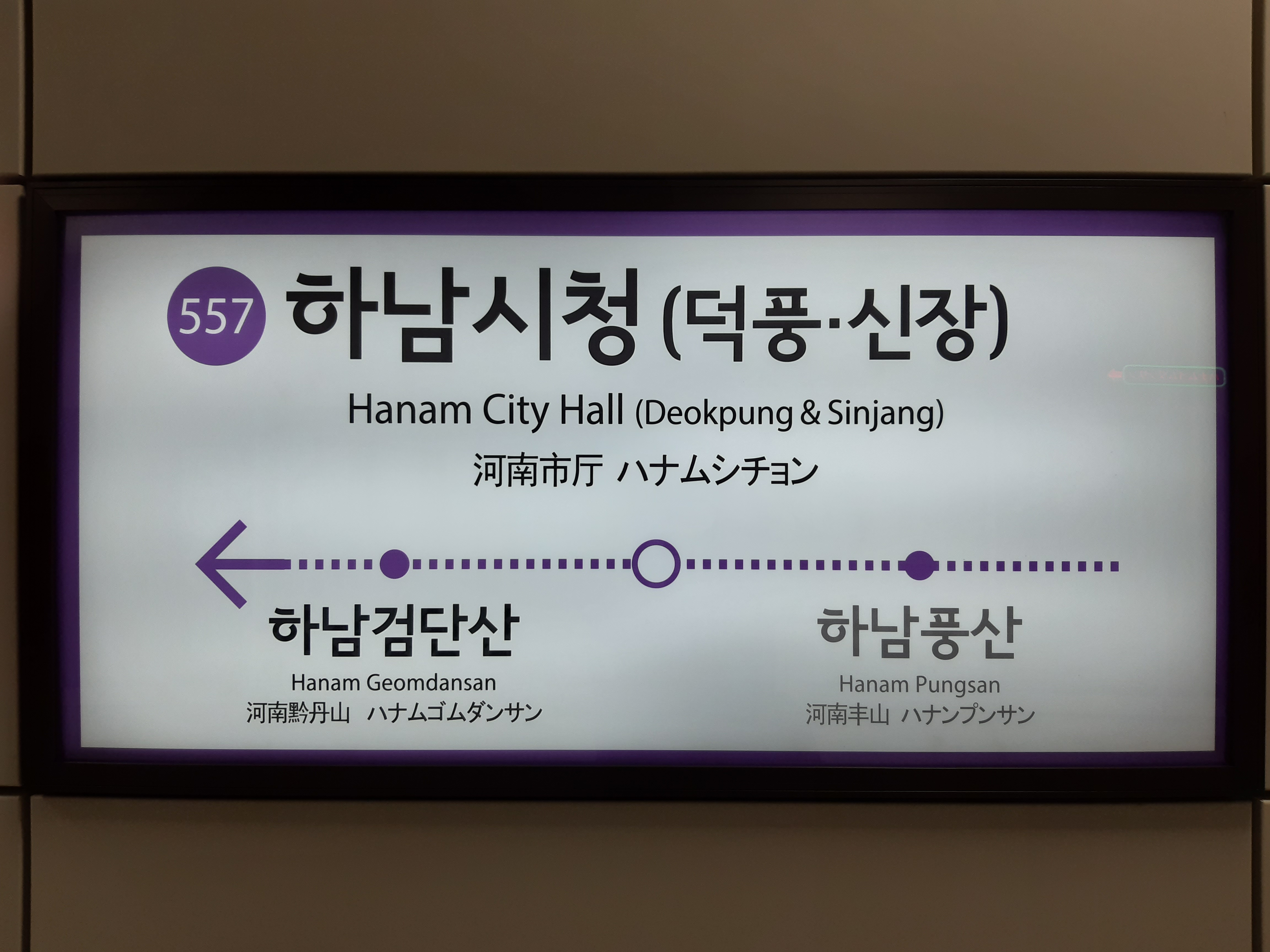

== Station layout ==
G	Street level	Exit

L1; Concourse	Lobby	Customer Service, Shops, Vending machines, ATMs

L2; Platforms	Side platform, doors will open on the right
L2; Platforms	Westbound	← Line 5 toward Banghwa (Hanam Pungsan)
L2; Platforms	Eastbound	Line 5 toward Hanam Geomdansan (Terminus)→
L2; Platforms	Side platform, doors will open on the right
