= Sinjeong station =

Metro station in South Korea

Coordinates: 37°31′30″N 126°51′22.6″E

신정 (은행정); Sinjeong (Eunhaengjeong)
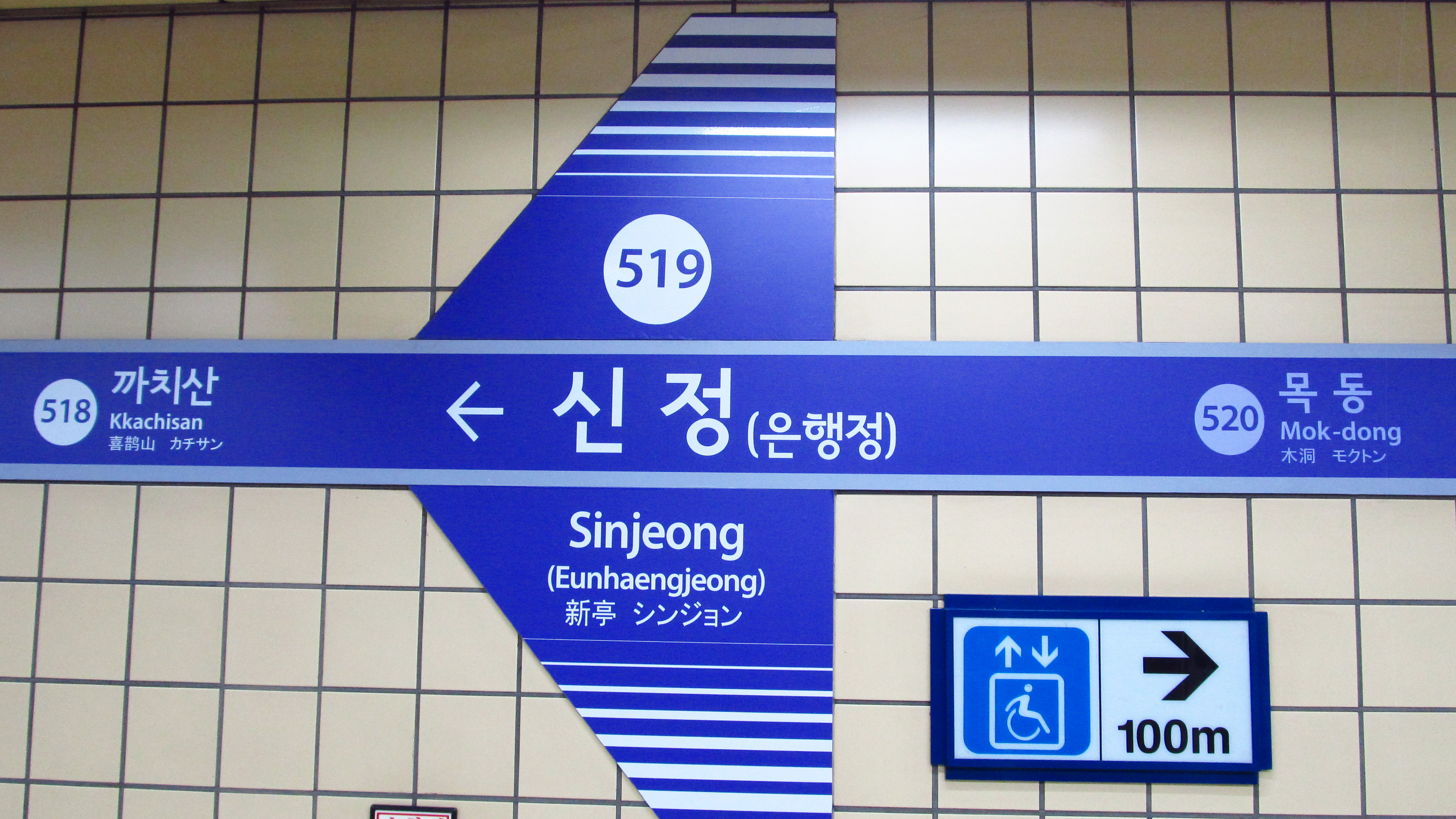
- Station sign

Korean name
- Hangul: 신정역
- Hanja: 新亭驛
- Revised Romanization: Sinjeong-yeok
- McCune–Reischauer: Sinjŏng-yŏk

General information
- Location: 949 Sinjeong-dong, Yangcheon-gu, Seoul
- Operator: Seoul Metro
- Line: Line 5
- Platforms: 2
- Tracks: 2

Construction
- Structure type: Underground

History
- Opened: August 12, 1996

Services
Preceding station	Seoul Metropolitan Subway	Following station
Kkachisan towards Banghwa	Line 5	Mok-dong towards Hanam Geomdansan or Macheon
Location

Sinjeong Station is a railway station on Seoul Subway Line 5, located in Yangcheon-gu, Seoul.

== Station layout ==
G	Street level	Exit

L1; Concourse	Lobby	Customer Service, Shops, Vending machines, ATMs

L2; Platforms	Side platform, doors will open on the right
L2; Platforms	Westbound	← Line 5 toward Banghwa (Kkachisan)
L2; Platforms	Eastbound	Line 5 toward Hanam Geomdansan or Macheon (Mok-dong)→
L2; Platforms	Side platform, doors will open on the right
