= Yeongdeungpo Market station =

Station of the Seoul Metropolitan Subway

Coordinates: 37°31′21.6″N 126°54′18.2″E

영등포시장; Yeongdeungpo Market
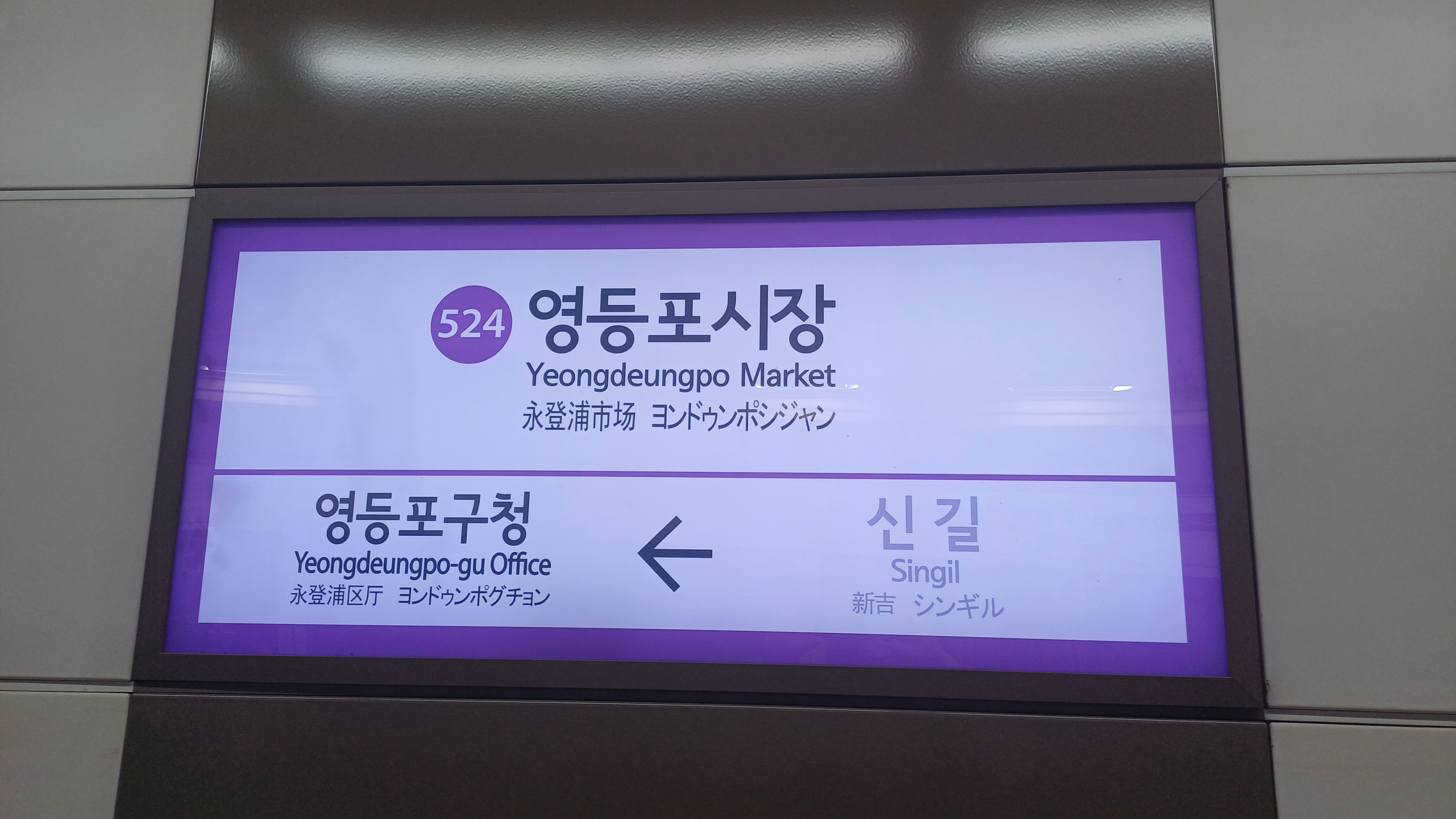
- Station sign

Korean name
- Hangul: 영등포시장역
- Hanja: 永登浦市場驛
- Revised Romanization: Yeongdeungposijang-yeok
- McCune–Reischauer: Yŏngdŭngp'osijang-yŏk

General information
- Location: 62-1 Yeongdeungpo-dong 5-ga, 200 Yangsanno, Yeongdeungpo-gu, Seoul
- Operator: Seoul Metro
- Line: Line 5
- Platforms: 2
- Tracks: 2

Construction
- Structure type: Underground

History
- Opened: August 12, 1996

Services
Preceding station	Seoul Metropolitan Subway	Following station
Yeongdeungpo-gu Office towards Banghwa	Line 5	Singil towards Hanam Geomdansan or Macheon
Location

Yeongdeungpo Market Station is a station on Seoul Subway Line 5 in Yeongdeungpo-gu, Seoul.

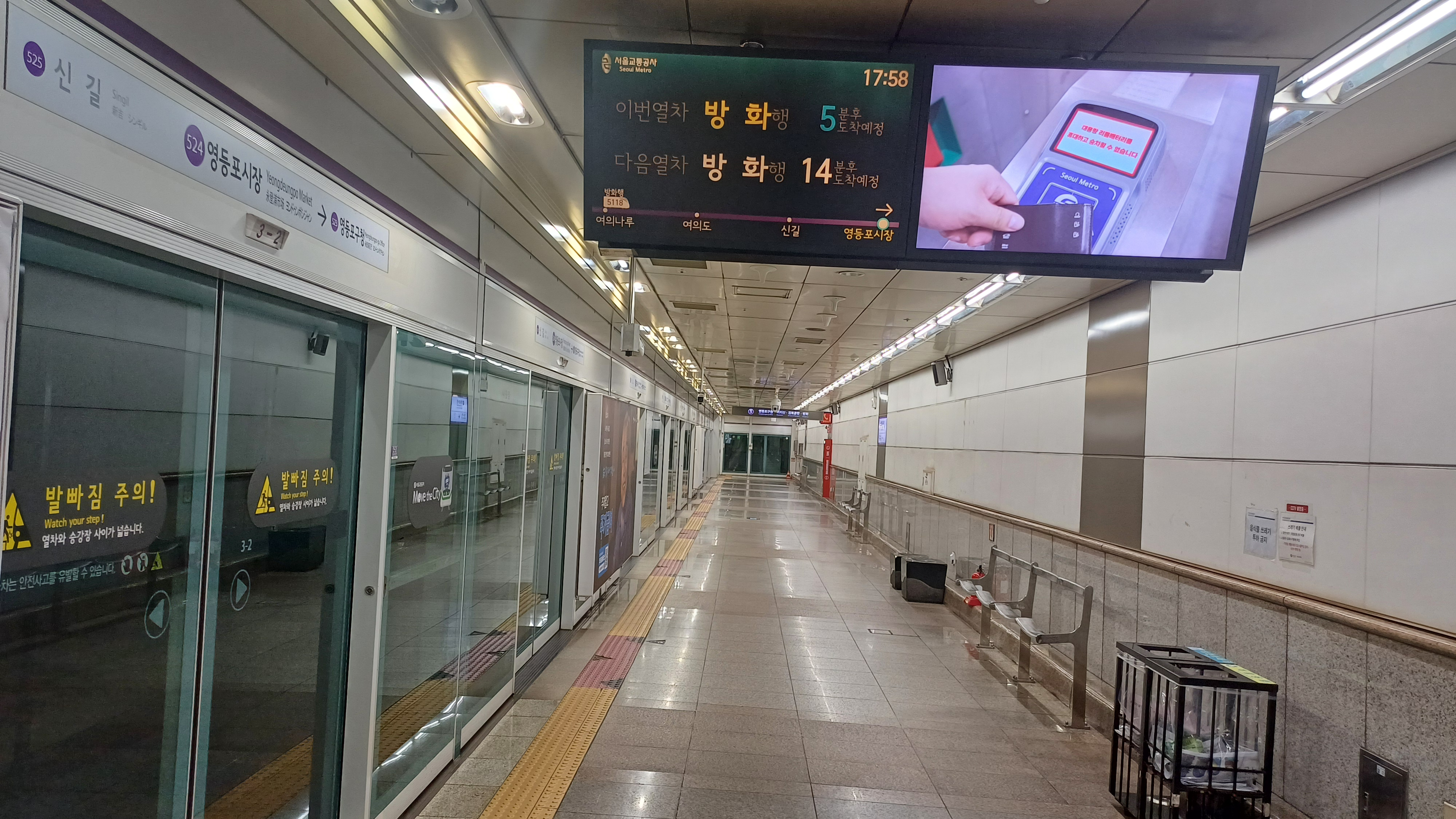
Station platform

== Station layout ==
G	Street level	Exit

L1; Concourse	Lobby	Customer Service, Shops, Vending machines, ATMs

L2; Platforms	Side platform, doors will open on the right
L2; Platforms	Westbound	← Line 5 toward Banghwa (Yeongdeungpo-gu Office)
L2; Platforms	Eastbound	Line 5 toward Hanam Geomdansan or Macheon (Singil)→
L2; Platforms	Side platform, doors will open on the right

The station has an unfinished station shell that was intended to become part of a Line 10.

== Vicinity ==
- Exit 1 : Yeongjung Elementary School
- Exit 2 : Yeongdong Elementary School
- Exit 3 : Yeongdeungpo Market
- Exit 4 : Jogwang Market
