= Yeongdeungpo-gu Office station =

Station of the Seoul Metropolitan Subway

| 영등포구청; Yeongdeungpo-gu Office |
| 영등포구청; Yeongdeungpo-gu Office |
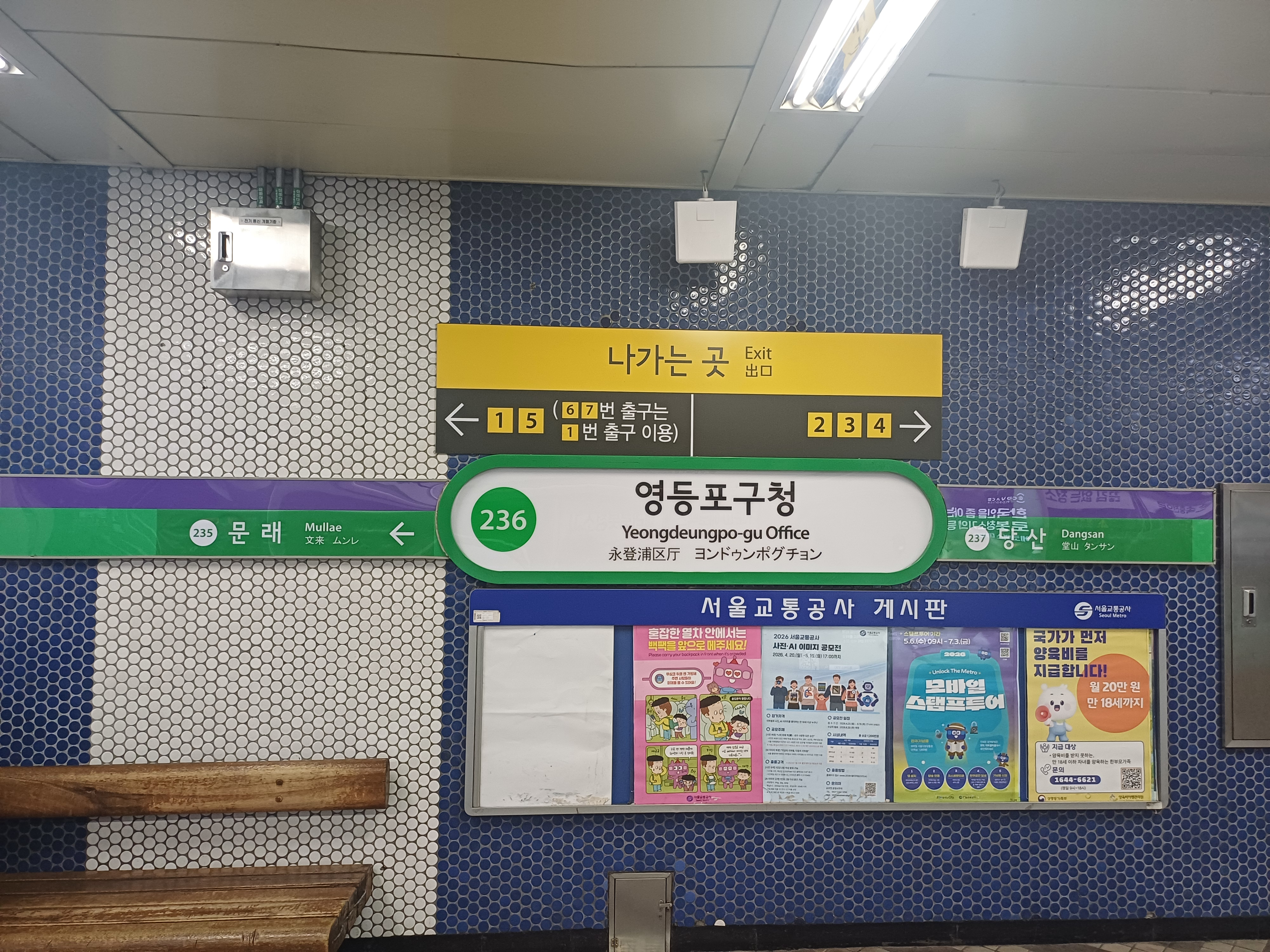
- Line 2 station nameplate

Korean name
- Hangul: 영등포구청역
- Hanja: 永登浦區廳驛
- Revised Romanization: Yeongdeungpogucheong-yeok
- McCune–Reischauer: Yŏngdŭngp'oguch'ŏng-yŏk

General information
- Location: 270-1 Dangsan-dong 3-ga, 121 Dangsanno, Yeongdeungpo-gu, Seoul
- Coordinates: 37°31′32″N 126°53′48″E
- Operator: Seoul Metro
- Lines: Line 2 Line 5
- Platforms: 4
- Tracks: 4

Construction
- Structure type: Underground

Key dates
- May 22, 1984: Line 2 opened
- August 12, 1996: Line 5 opened

Passengers
- (Daily) Based on Jan-Dec of 2012. Line 2: 43,252; Line 5: 6,558

Services
| Preceding station | Seoul Metropolitan Subway | Following station |
|---|---|---|
| Mullae Next counterclockwise | Line 2 | Dangsan Next clockwise |
| Yangpyeong towards Banghwa | Line 5 | Yeongdeungpo Market towards Hanam Geomdansan or Macheon |
Location

Yeongdeungpo-gu Office station is a station on Seoul Subway Line 2 and Seoul Subway Line 5. Before Mok-dong station on Line 5 was completed, this station served as a link to that neighbourhood via bus.

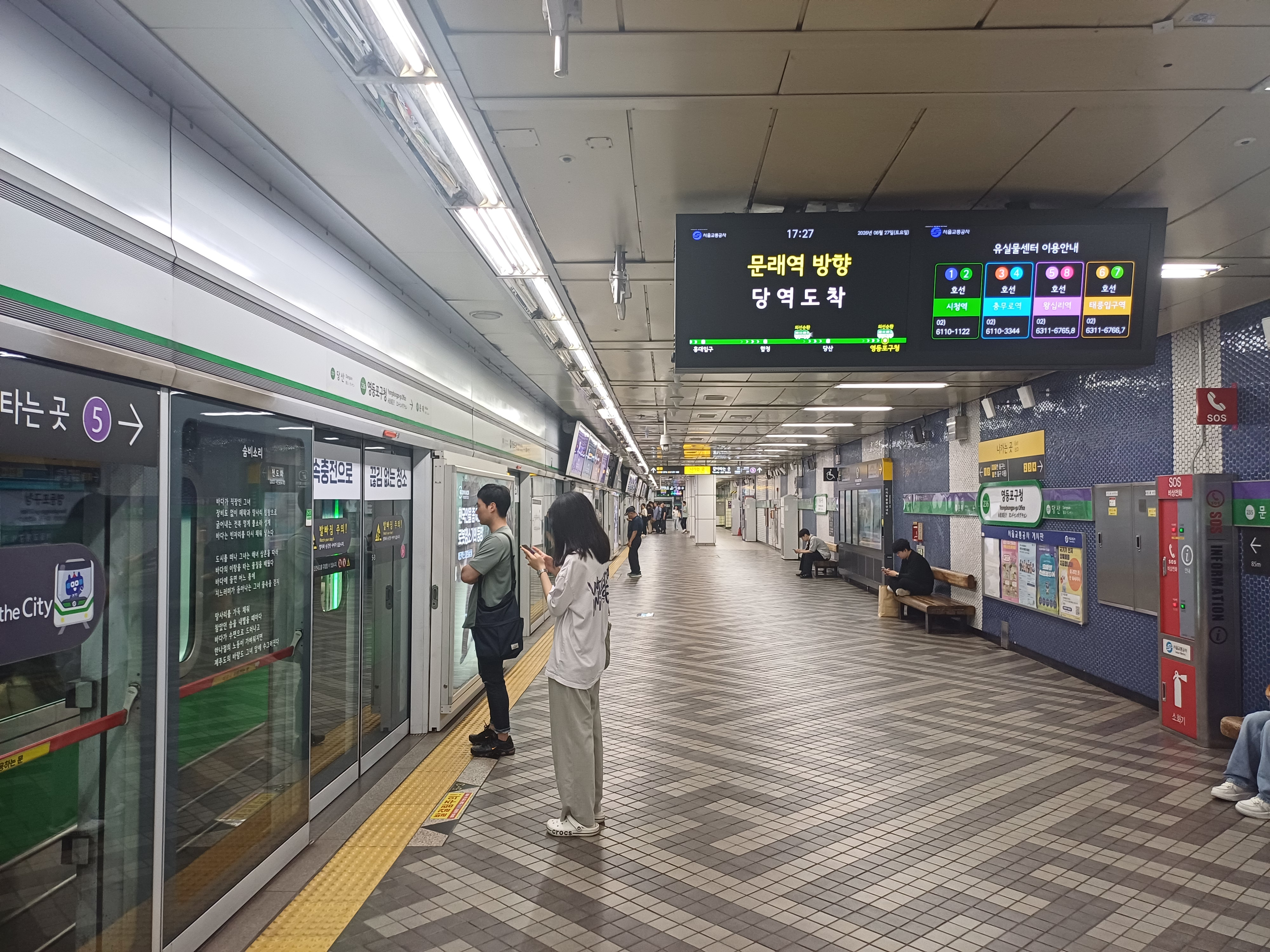
Line 2 platform

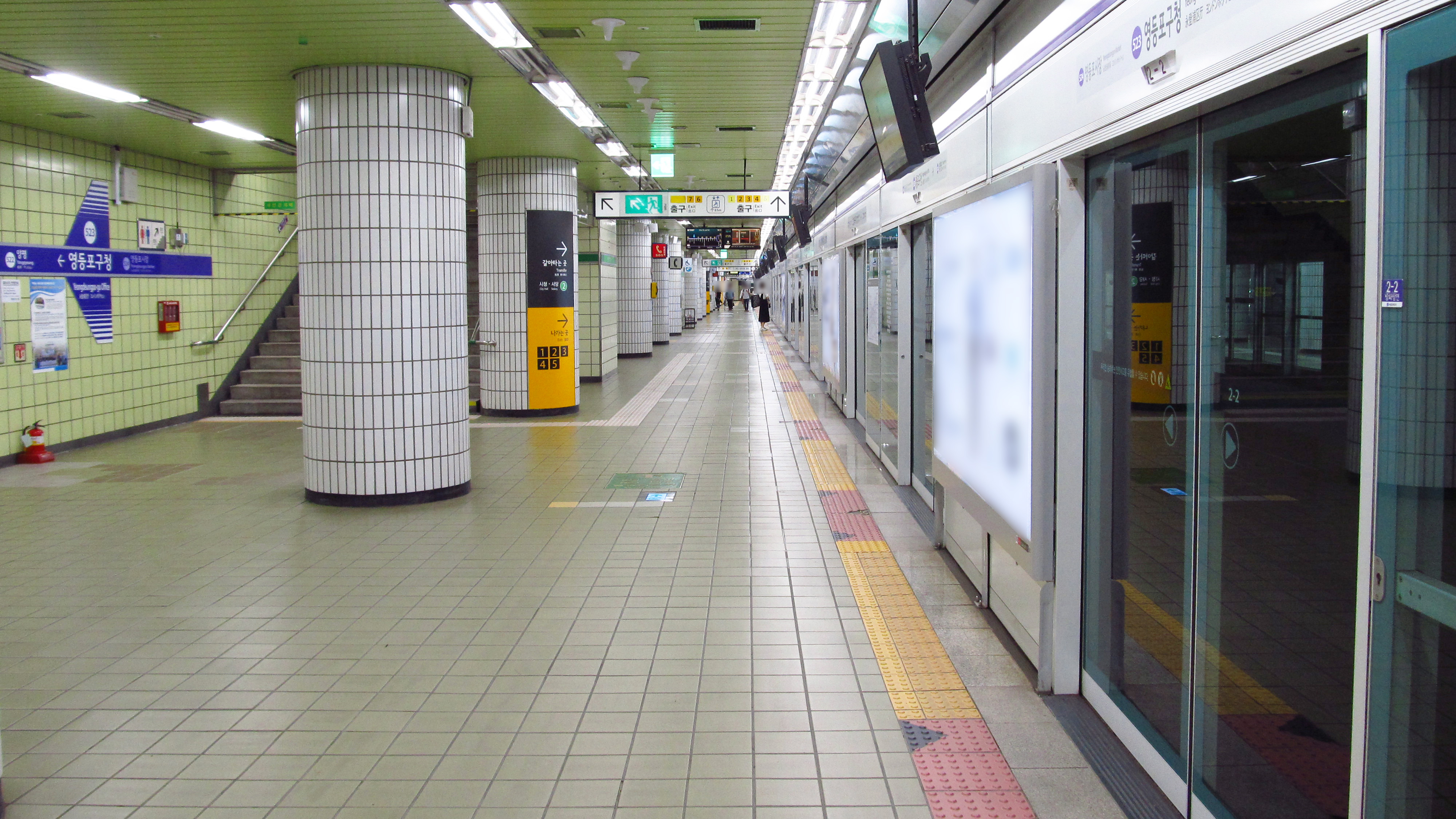
Line 5 platform

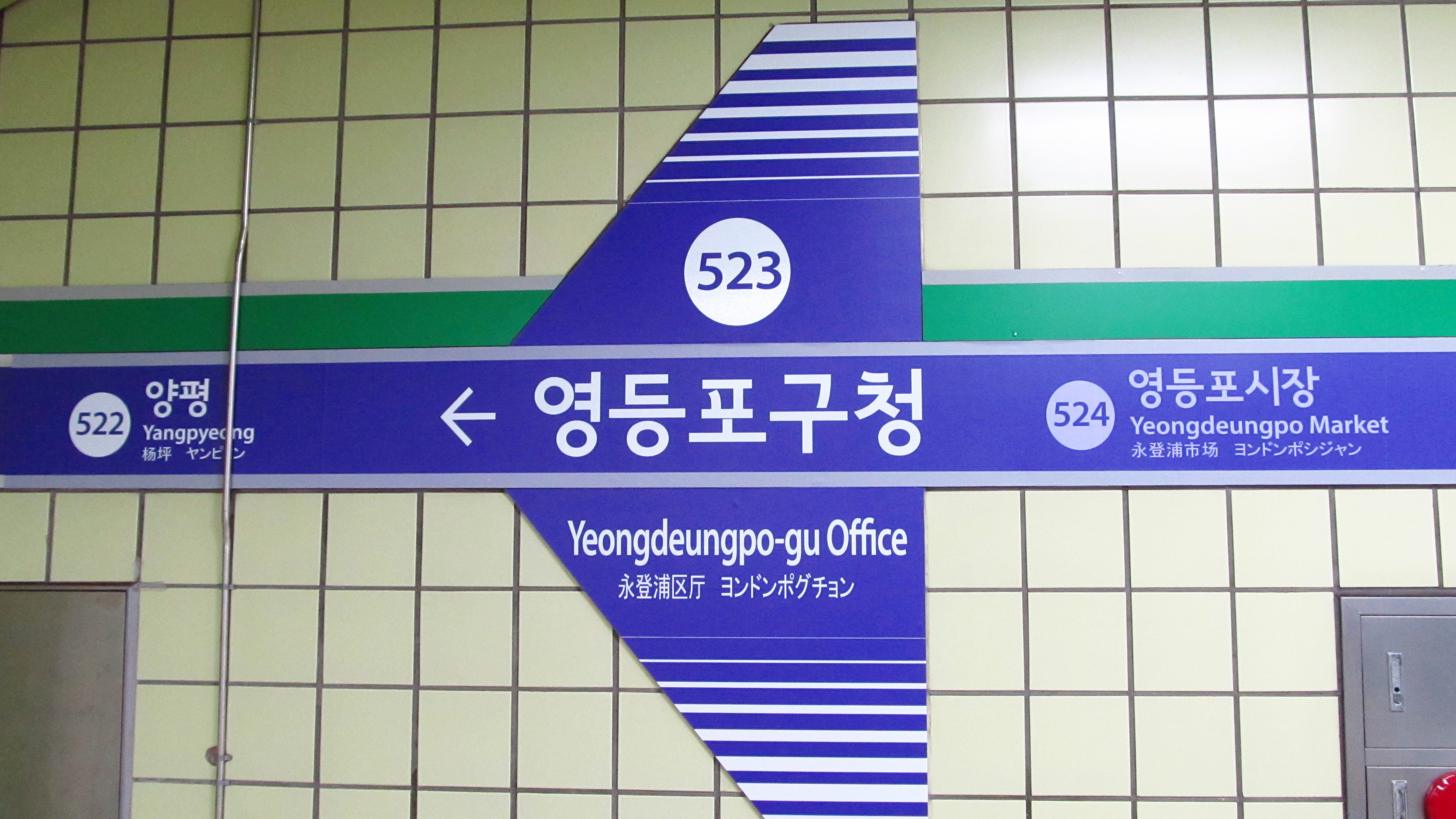
Line 5 station nameplate
