= Mok-dong station =

Train station in Seoul

Coordinates: 37°31′33.8″N 126°51′53.4″E

목동; Mok-dong
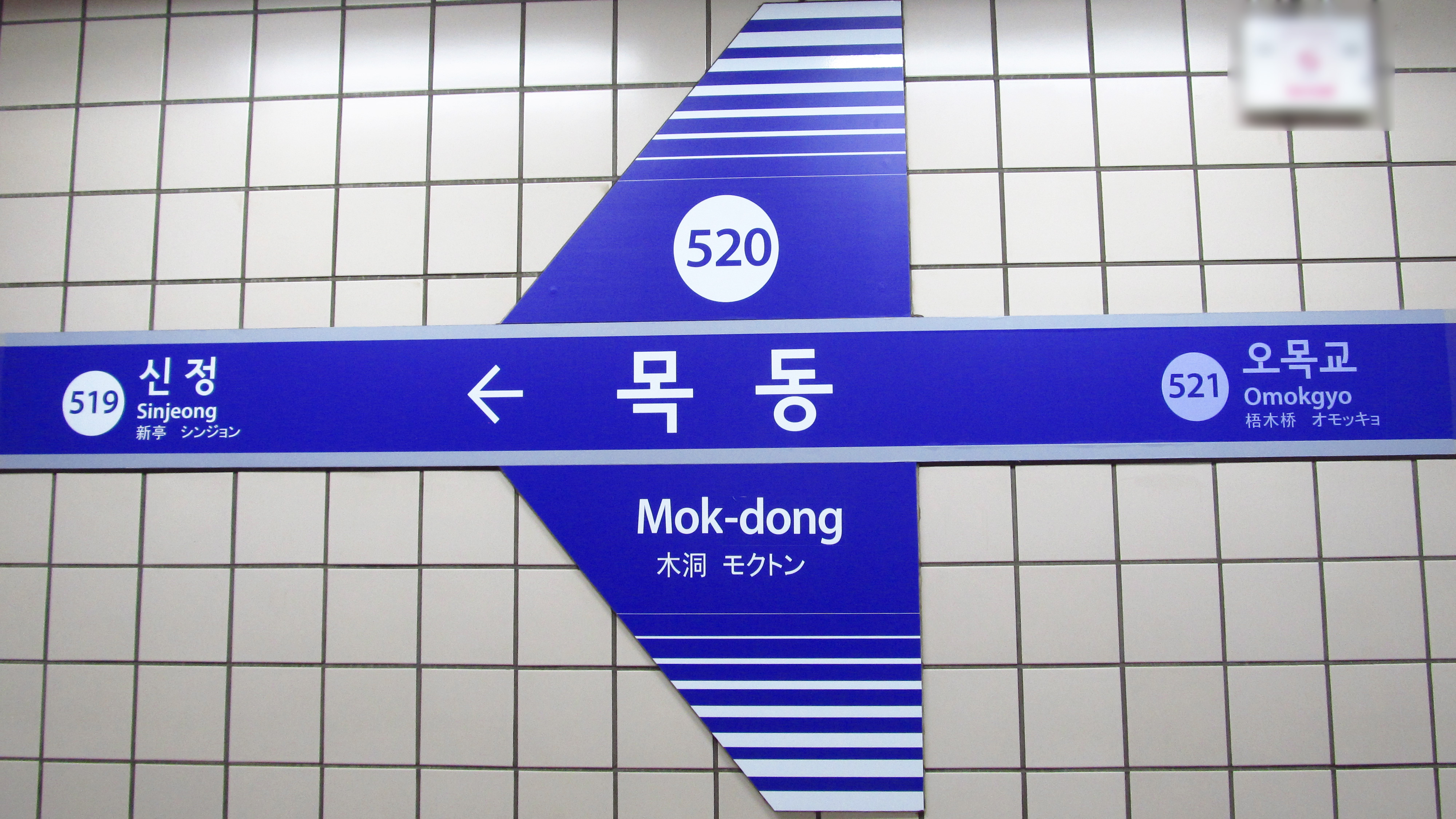
- Station Sign

Korean name
- Hangul: 목동역
- Hanja: 木洞驛
- Revised Romanization: Mokdong-yeok
- McCune–Reischauer: Moktong-yŏk

General information
- Location: 245 Omok-ro Jiha, 926-3 Mok 1-dong, Yangcheon-gu, Seoul
- Operator: Seoul Metro
- Line: Line 5
- Platforms: 2
- Tracks: 2

Construction
- Structure type: Underground

History
- Opened: August 12, 1996

Services
Preceding station	Seoul Metropolitan Subway	Following station
Sinjeong towards Banghwa	Line 5	Omokgyo towards Hanam Geomdansan or Macheon
Location

Mok-dong Station is a railway station on Seoul Subway Line 5 in Yangcheon-gu, Seoul.

== Station layout ==
G	Street level	Exit

L1; Concourse	Lobby	Customer Service, Shops, Vending machines, ATMs

L2; Platforms	Side platform, doors will open on the right
L2; Platforms	Westbound	← Line 5 toward Banghwa (Sinjeong)
L2; Platforms	Eastbound	Line 5 toward Hanam Geomdansan or Macheon (Omokgyo)→
L2; Platforms	Side platform, doors will open on the right
