= Gaehwasan station =

Subway station in Seoul, South Korea

Coordinates: 37°34′20″N 126°48′22″E

개화산; Gaehwasan
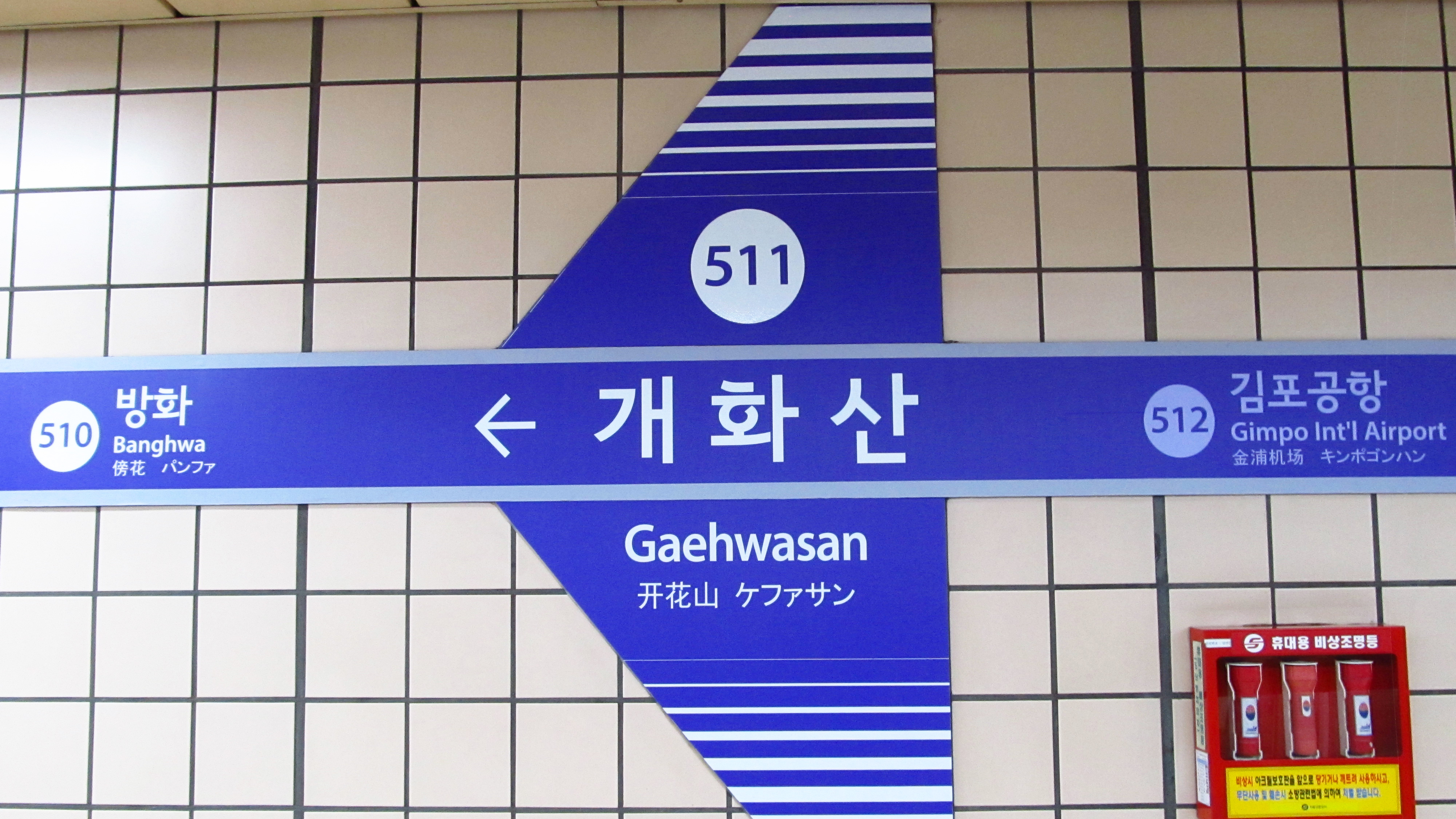

Korean name
- Hangul: 개화산역
- Hanja: 開花山驛
- Revised Romanization: Gaehwasan-yeok
- McCune–Reischauer: Kaehwasan-yŏk

General information
- Location: 846 Banghwa-dong, 22 Yangcheonno, Gangseo-gu, Seoul
- Operator: Seoul Metro
- Line: Line 5
- Platforms: 2
- Tracks: 2

Construction
- Structure type: Underground

History
- Opened: March 20, 1996

Services
Preceding station	Seoul Metropolitan Subway	Following station
Banghwa Terminus	Line 5	Gimpo International Airport towards Hanam Geomdansan or Macheon
Location

Gaehwasan Station is a subway station on Seoul Subway Line 5 in Gangseo District, Seoul. Its name comes from the nearby Gaehwasan mountain.

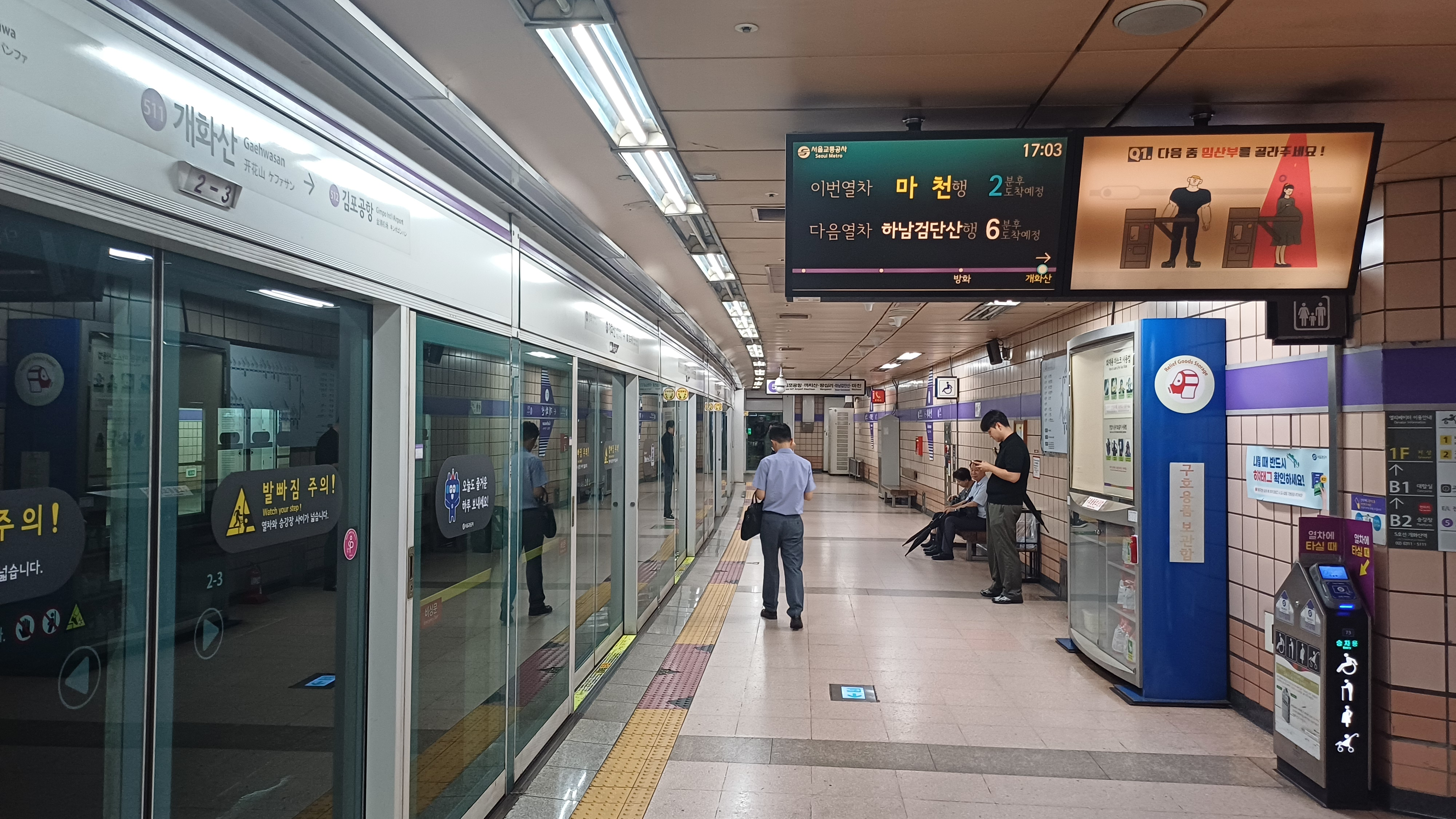
Platform

== Station layout ==
G	Street level	Exit

L1; Concourse	Lobby	Customer Service, Shops, Vending machines, ATMs

L2; Platforms	Side platform, doors will open on the right
L2; Platforms	Westbound	← Line 5 toward Banghwa (Terminus)
L2; Platforms	Eastbound	Line 5 toward Hanam Geomdansan or Macheon (Gimpo Int'l Airport)→
L2; Platforms	Side platform, doors will open on the right

== Vicinity ==
Public Centers:

- Banghwa 1-dong Citizen's Center
- Banghwa 2-dong Citizen's Center
- Gaehwa Peace Center
- Mt. Gaehwa

Schools:

- Gaehwa Elementary School
- Banghwa Elementary School
- Banghwa Middle School
- Seongji Middle School
- Seongji High School
- Airport High School
- Hanseo High School
