= Yuhwang-ori =

Korean duck dish

Yuhwang-ori (Korean: 유황오리) is a traditional Korean dish, made of duck that has been fed sulfur and is then slow-cooked for up to three hours. The duck is cooked with different medicinal herbs and is believed to have originated in the city of Hanam.

== See also ==
- List of duck dishes
