= Seoul Subway Line 5 =

Subway line in South Korea

Line 5
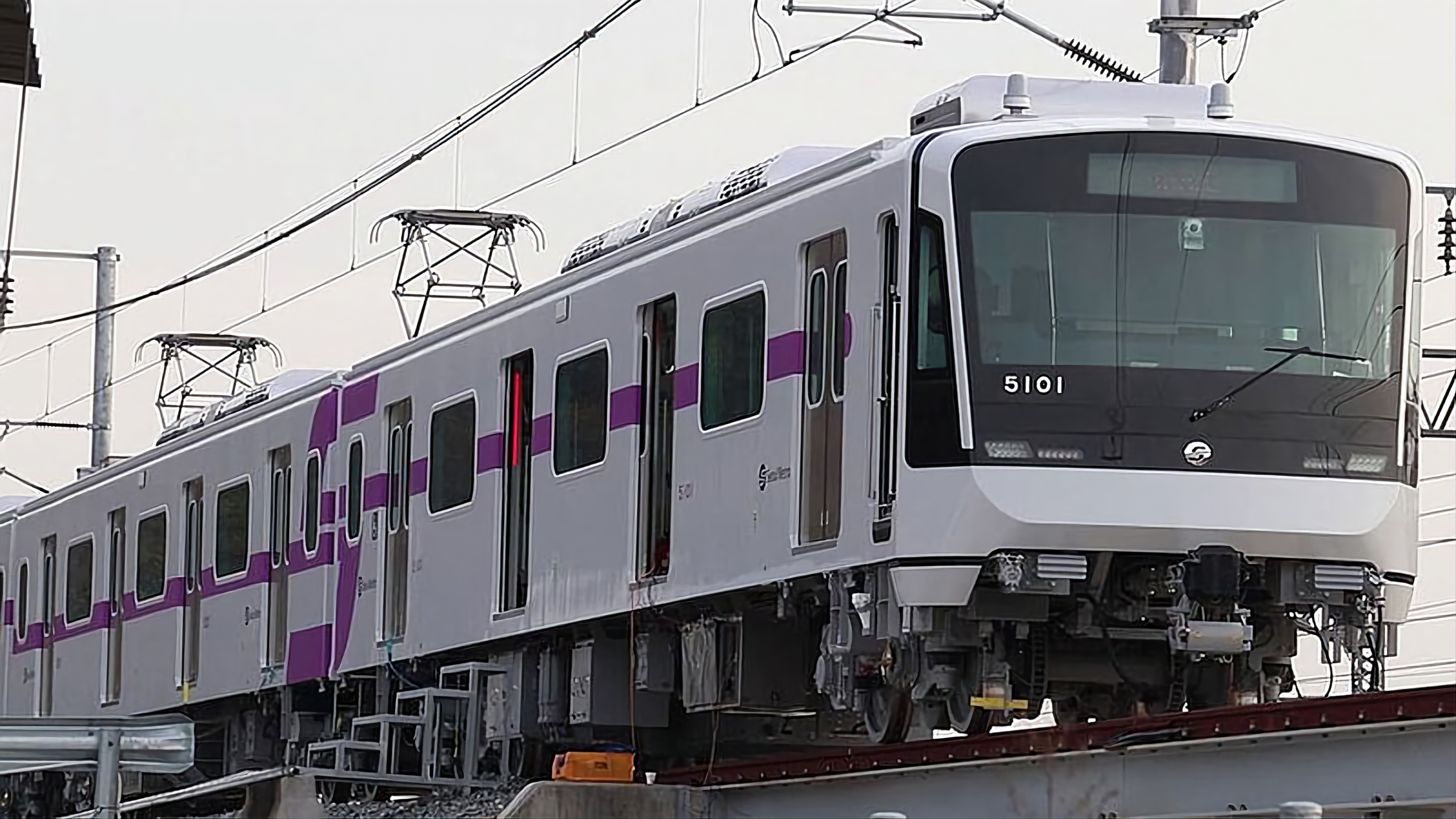
- 4th Generation Line 5 train

Overview
- Native name: 5호선(五號線); O Hoseon
- Status: Operational
- Termini: Banghwa; Hanam Geomdansan / Macheon
- Stations: 57

Service
- Type: Rapid transit
- System: Seoul Metropolitan Subway
- Operator: Seoul Metro
- Daily ridership: 944,969 (2024)
- Ridership: 345.86 million (2024) (▲3.3%)

History
- Opened: 15 November 1995; 30 years ago
- Last extension: 2021

Technical
- Line length: 58.9 km (36.6 mi)
- Number of tracks: 2
- Electrification: 1,500 V DC overhead catenary
Route map
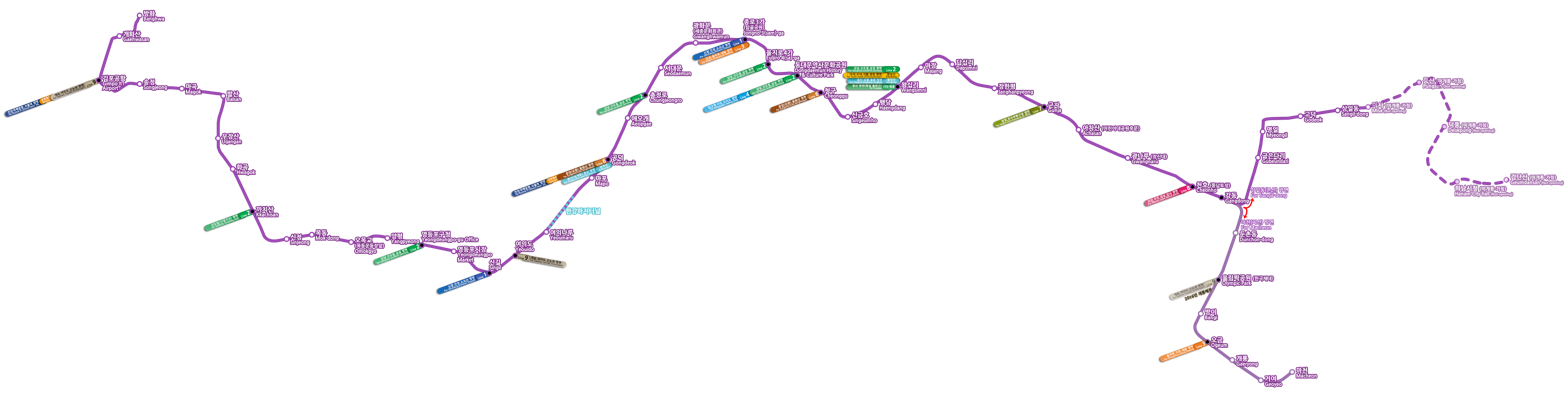

Seoul Subway Line 5 of the Seoul Metropolitan Subway, dubbed the violet line, is a long line crossing from west to the east across the Seoul National Capital Area, South Korea. It is one of two subway lines in Seoul to cross under the Han River (the other being the Suin-Bundang Line), which is done at two points (between Mapo and Yeouinaru, and also between Gwangnaru and Cheonho). The main line runs through to Hanam Geomdansan Station while the branch line from Gangdong Station terminates at Macheon Station. In 2019, Line 5 carried an annual ridership of 334 million or about 915,000 passengers per day. It is the only line so far to have no above-ground stations, though it initially shared this distinction with Line 6 before the construction of Sinnae station.

Line 5 has a different station sign design compared to the first four lines; its station signs have purple or blue arrowhead-shaped designs with their station's number printed in the top, the Hangul name in the centre, and the English and Hanja names on the bottom, with an arm pointing out of the end of the arrowhead indicating the next station, with the straight part of the arrowhead holding the previous station's name. This design would be repeated in Lines 7 and 8, while a similar design with a chevron-shaped sign would be employed in Line 6.

The total length of this line is 58.9 kilometres (36.6 mi). Upon opening, it was among the longest underground railway tunnels of any kind constructed. Today it is the 8th longest continuous underground subway tunnel in the world, just behind Chengdu Metro Line 6, Qingdao Metro Line 1, Guangzhou Metro Line 18, Guangzhou Metro Line 3, Moscow Metro Bolshaya Koltsevaya Line, Beijing Subway Line 10 and Beijing Subway Line 6. Line 5 is also the first subway and passenger railway line in the Korean Peninsula to directly serve an airport, when the line was extended westward to Banghwa via Gimpo International Airport in 1996.

== History ==
The line was built 1990–1996 and is an important east–west link connecting Gimpo Airport, the Yeouido business area, downtown Seoul, and the Gangdong residential districts.

In 1996 Line 5 was implemented with Automatic train operation. However, it was deemed that a driver would be necessary in case of a breakdown of the automation system, therefore each subway train has one driver on board.

It was the world's longest underground railway line for 9 years until Guangzhou Metro Line 3 came into operation in 2005.

In December 2010 the line is recorded as having the third highest WiFi data consumption in the Seoul Metropolitan area. It averaged 1.67 times more than the other 14 subway lines fitted with WiFi service zones.

The main branch of the line was extended to the city of Hanam with a total of 5 stations spanning 6.5 km. The extension opened in two stages; the first opened on August 8, 2020, and the other opened on March 27, 2021.

== Tourism ==
In January 2013, the Seoul Metropolitan Rapid Transit Corporation, which operated the line at the time, published free guidebooks features eight tours as well as recommendations for accommodations, restaurants and shopping centers. These guidebooks were printed in three languages: English, Japanese and Chinese (simplified and traditional). They were distributed from information centers on this line.

The tours are designed with different themes for travel along the subway lines, e.g. Korean traditional culture. The destinations range from Jongno 3-ga Station to Anguk Station and Gyeongbokgung Station on line No 3 showcasing antique shops and art galleries of Insa-dong.

In the summer of 2013, the Seoul Metropolitan Rapid Transit Corporation to display water parks that are located near stations operated by the Seoul Metropolitan Rapid Transit Corporation on the LCD screens both inside the train, and on the station platforms.

== Stations ==
=== Current Routes ===
- Banghwa — Hanam Geomdansan (main line)
- Banghwa — Macheon (Macheon branch)
- Macheon — Hanam Geomdansan (future)

=== Main Line ===
Station Number	Station Name English	Station Name Hangul	Transfer	Distance in km	Total Distance	Location	
500	Nusan (2033)	누산		---	---	Gyeonggi-do	Gimpo-si
501	Seokmo (2033)	석모		---	---	Gyeonggi-do	Gimpo-si
502	Janggi (2033)	장기	Gimpo Goldline	---	---	Gyeonggi-do	Gimpo-si
503	Gamjeong (2033)	감정	(Goyang branch)	---	---	Gyeonggi-do	Gimpo-si
504	Singeomdanjungang (2033)	신검단중앙	Incheon Subway Line 1	---	---	Incheon	Geomdan-gu
505	Ara (2033)	아라	Incheon Subway Line 1	---	---	Incheon	Geomdan-gu
506	Pungmu (2033)	풍무	Gimpo Goldline	---	---	Gyeonggi-do	Gimpo-si
507	Hyangsan (2033)	향산		---	---	Gyeonggi-do	Gimpo-si
508	Jeonho (2033)	전호		---	---	Gyeonggi-do	Gimpo-si
509	Gangseo Hakang Park (2033)	강서한강공원		---	---	Seoul	Gangseo-gu
510	Banghwa	방화		---	0.0	Seoul	Gangseo-gu
511	Gaehwasan	개화산		0.9	0.9	Seoul	Gangseo-gu
512	Gimpo Int'l Airport	김포공항	Gimpo Goldline Seohae Line	1.2	2.1	Seoul	Gangseo-gu
513	Songjeong	송정		1.2	3.3	Seoul	Gangseo-gu
514	Magok (Home & Shopping)	마곡 (홈앤쇼핑)		1.1	4.4	Seoul	Gangseo-gu
515	Balsan	발산		1.2	5.6	Seoul	Gangseo-gu
516	Ujangsan	우장산		1.1	6.7	Seoul	Gangseo-gu
517	Hwagok	화곡		1.0	7.7	Seoul	Gangseo-gu
518	Kkachisan	까치산	(Sinjeong branch)	1.2	8.9	Seoul	Gangseo-gu
519	Sinjeong (Eunhaengjeong)	신정 (은행정)		1.3	10.2	Seoul	Yangcheon-gu
520	Mok-dong	목동		0.8	11.0	Seoul	Yangcheon-gu
521	Omokgyo (Mokdong Stadium)	오목교 (목동운동장앞)		0.9	11.9	Seoul	Yangcheon-gu
522	Yangpyeong	양평		1.1	13.0	Seoul	Yeongdeungpo-gu
523	Yeongdeungpo-gu Office	영등포구청	Seoul Subway Line 2	0.8	13.8	Seoul	Yeongdeungpo-gu
524	Yeongdeungpo Market	영등포시장		0.9	14.7	Seoul	Yeongdeungpo-gu
525	Singil	신길	Seoul Subway Line 1	1.1	15.8	Seoul	Yeongdeungpo-gu
526	Yeouido	여의도	Seoul Subway Line 9	1.0	16.8	Seoul	Yeongdeungpo-gu
527	Yeouinaru	여의나루		1.0	17.8	Seoul	Yeongdeungpo-gu
528	Mapo	마포		1.8	19.6	Seoul	Mapo-gu
529	Gongdeok	공덕	Gyeongui–Jungang Line	0.8	20.4	Seoul	Mapo-gu
530	Aeogae	애오개		1.1	21.5	Seoul	Mapo-gu
531	Chungjeongno (Kyonggi Univ.)	충정로 (경기대입구)	Seoul Subway Line 2	0.9	22.4	Seoul	Seodaemun-gu
532	Seodaemun (Kangbuk Samsung Hospital)	서대문 (강북삼성병원)		0.7	23.1	Seoul	Jongno-gu
533	Gwanghwamun (Sejong Center for the Performing Arts)	광화문 (세종문화회관)		1.1	24.2	Seoul	Jongno-gu
534	Jongno 3(sam)-ga (Tapgol Park)	종로3가 (탑골공원)	Seoul Subway Line 1 Seoul Subway Line 3	1.2	25.4	Seoul	Jongno-gu
535	Euljiro 4(sa)-ga (BC Card)	을지로4가 (BC카드)	Seoul Subway Line 2	1.0	26.4	Seoul	Jung-gu
536	Dongdaemun History & Culture Park (DDP)	동대문역사문화공원 (DDP)	Seoul Subway Line 2 Seoul Subway Line 4	0.9	27.3	Seoul	Jung-gu
537	Cheonggu	청구	Seoul Subway Line 6	0.9	28.2	Seoul	Jung-gu
538	Singeumho	신금호		0.9	29.1	Seoul	Seongdong-gu
539	Haengdang	행당		0.8	29.9	Seoul	Seongdong-gu
540	Wangsimni (Seongdong-gu Office)	왕십리 (성동구청)	Gyeongui–Jungang Line Suin–Bundang Line	0.9	30.8	Seoul	Seongdong-gu
541	Majang	마장		0.7	31.5	Seoul	Seongdong-gu
542	Dapsimni	답십리		1.0	32.5	Seoul	Dongdaemun-gu
543	Janghanpyeong	장한평		1.2	33.7	Seoul	Dongdaemun-gu
544	Gunja (Neung-dong)	군자 (능동)	Seoul Subway Line 7	1.5	35.2	Seoul	Gwangjin-gu
545	Achasan (Rear Entrance to Seoul Children's Grand Park)	아차산 (어린이대공원후문)		1.0	36.2	Seoul	Gwangjin-gu
546	Gwangnaru (Presbyterian Univ. & Theological Seminary)	광나루 (장신대)		1.5	37.7	Seoul	Gwangjin-gu
547	Cheonho (Pungnaptoseong)	천호 (풍납토성)	Seoul Subway Line 8	2.0	39.7	Seoul	Gangdong-gu
548	Gangdong (Kangdong Sacred Heart Hospital)	강동 (강동성심병원)	(for Macheon)	0.8	40.5	Seoul	Gangdong-gu
549	Gil-dong	길동		0.9	41.4	Seoul	Gangdong-gu
550	Gubeundari (Gangdong Community Center)	굽은다리 (강동구민회관앞)		0.8	42.2	Seoul	Gangdong-gu
551	Myeongil	명일		0.7	42.9	Seoul	Gangdong-gu
552	Godeok (Kyung Hee Univ. Hospital at Gangdong)	고덕 (강동경희대병원)	(2028)	1.2	44.1	Seoul	Gangdong-gu
553	Sangil-dong	상일동		1.1	45.2	Seoul	Gangdong-gu
554	Gangil	강일		0.7	45.9	Seoul	Gangdong-gu
555	Misa	미사		1.7	47.6	Gyeonggi-do	Hanam-si
556	Hanam Pungsan	하남풍산		2.1	49.7	Gyeonggi-do	Hanam-si
557	Hanam City Hall (Deokpung & Sinjang)	하남시청 (덕풍·신장)	(2032)	1.3	51.0	Gyeonggi-do	Hanam-si
558	Hanam Geomdansan	하남검단산		1.7	52.7	Gyeonggi-do	Hanam-si

=== Macheon Branch ===
Station Number	Station Name English	Station Name Hangul	Transfer	Distance in km	Total Distance	Location	
548	Gangdong (Kangdong Sacred Heart Hospital)	강동 (강동성심병원)	(for Hanam Geomdansan)	0.8	40.5	Seoul	Gangdong-gu
P549	Dunchon-dong	둔촌동		1.2	41.7	Seoul	Gangdong-gu
P550	Olympic Park (Korea National Sport Univ.)	올림픽공원 (한국체대)	Seoul Subway Line 9	1.4	43.1	Seoul	Songpa-gu
P551	Bangi	방이		0.9	44.0	Seoul	Songpa-gu
P552	Ogeum	오금	Seoul Subway Line 3	0.9	44.9	Seoul	Songpa-gu
P553	Gaerong	개롱		0.9	45.8	Seoul	Songpa-gu
P554	Geoyeo	거여		0.9	46.7	Seoul	Songpa-gu
P555	Macheon	마천		0.9	47.6	Seoul	Songpa-gu

== Rolling stock ==
=== Current ===
==== Seoul Metro ====
- Seoul Metro 5000 series
  - 1st generation – since 1994 (Retired)
  - 2nd generation – since 1996
  - 3rd generation – since 2018
  - 4th generation – since 2021
  - (Future) 5th generation – since 2024
  - (Future) 6th generation – since 2026
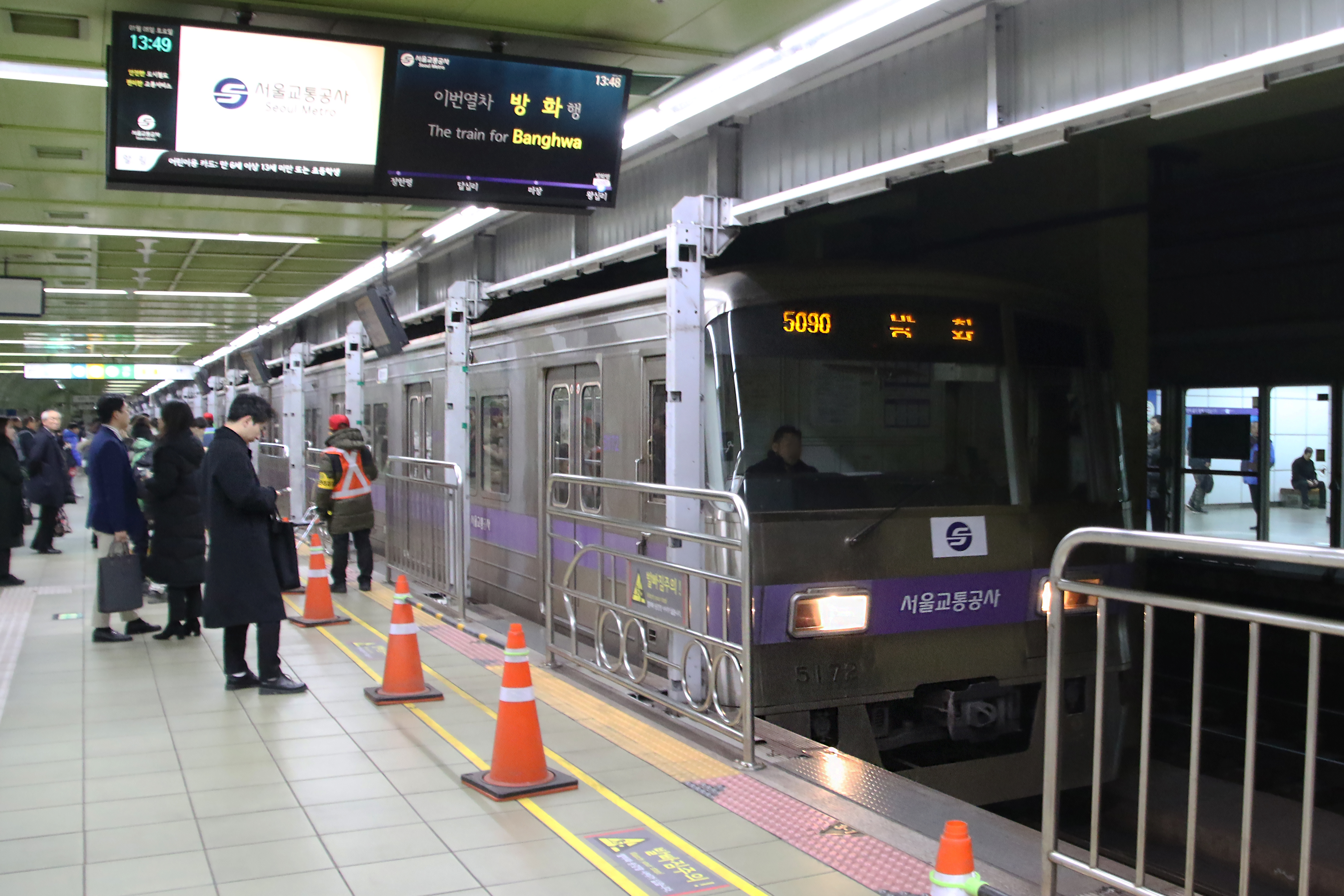
Seoul Metro 5000 series EMU (2nd generation)

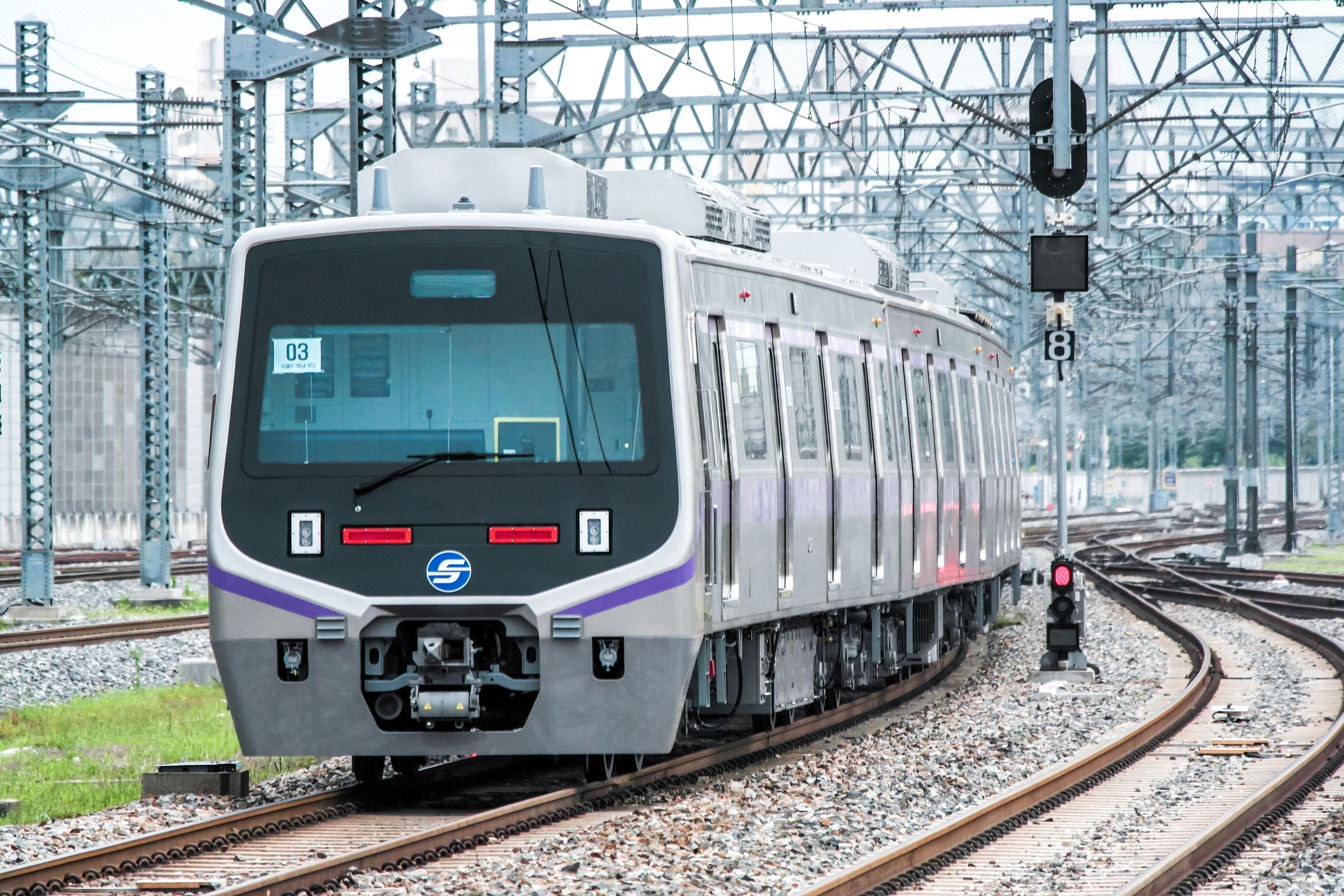
Seoul Metro 5000 series EMU (3rd generation)

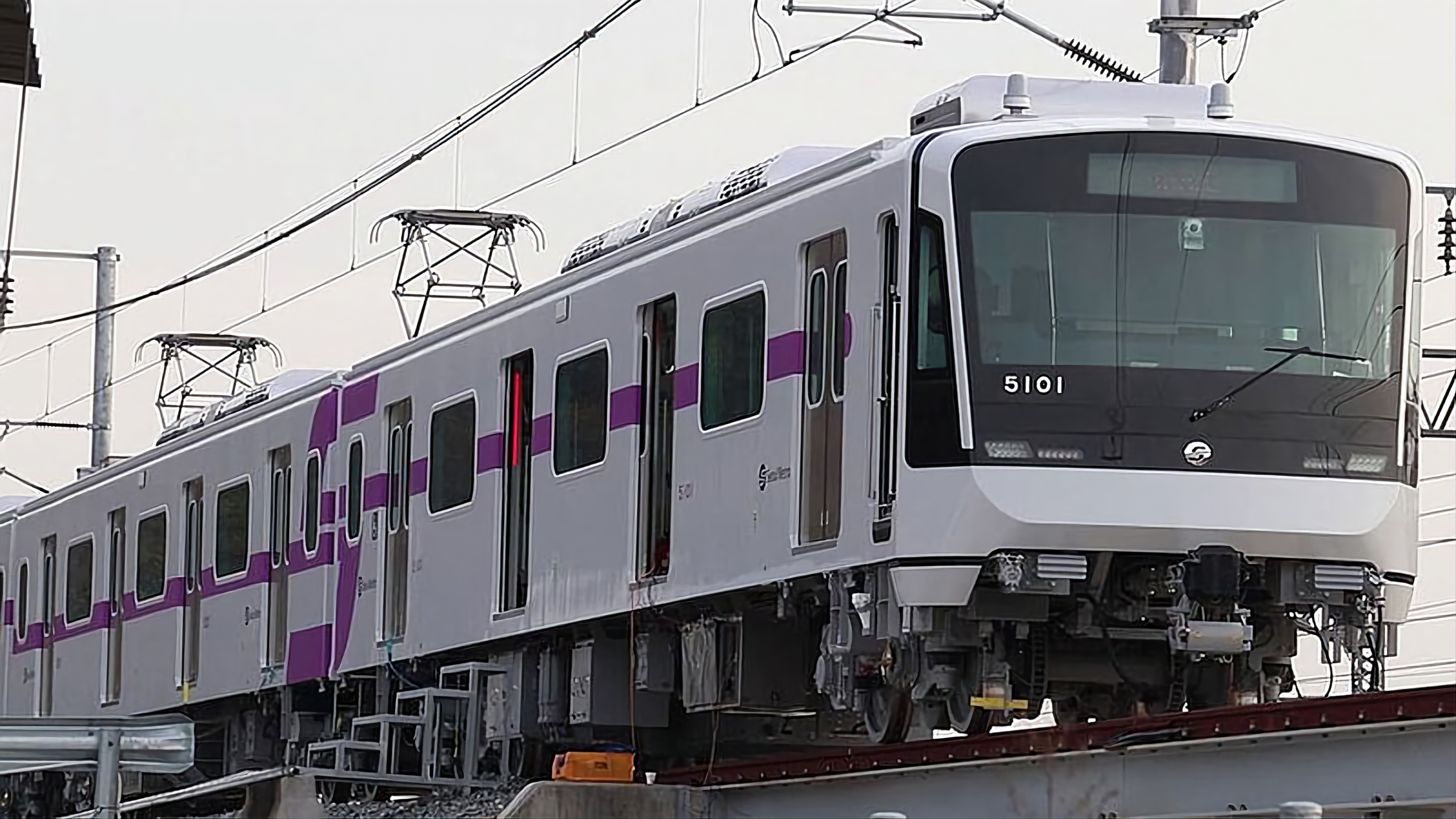
Seoul Metro 5000 series (4th generation)

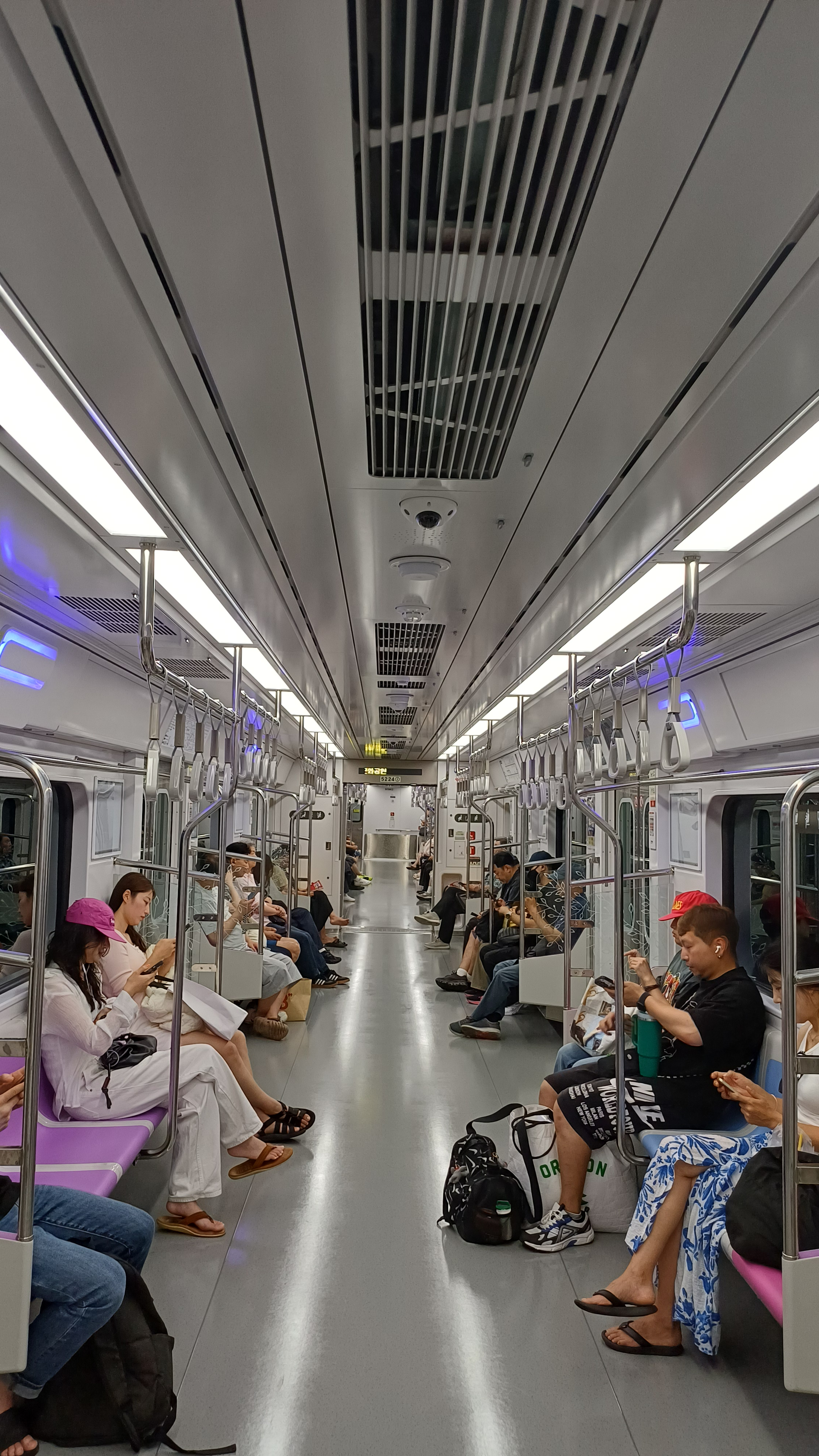
Seoul Metro 5000 series inside (4th generation)

== Ridership ==
Seoul Subway Line 5 Ridership (Note: The ridership is calculated based on boarding and transferring passengers (a+c). The data tallies between the two sources but the Seoul Metro source is more granular. The ridership data is derived from the 서울교통공사 수송실적 (Seoul Metro transport performance) data/report.)
Year	Ridership	Change (%)	Remarks
2026	177,906,025	-	Updated as of June 2026
2025	347,960,248	▲0.6	Highest on record
2024	345,858,654	▲3.3	
2023	334,884,000	▲8.7	Restoration of 2019 ridership
2022	308,022,000	▲11.6	
2021	276,001,000	▲6.7	Extension from Hanam Pungsan to Hanam Geodamsan opens for service
2020	258,551,000	▼22.6	COVID-19 pandemic Extension from Sangil-dong to Hanam Pungsan opens for service
2019	333,836,000	▲1.6	
2018	328,528,000	▲0.2	
2017	327,891,000	▼0.0	
2016	327,935,000	▲6.3	
2015	308,501,000	▼1.2	
2014	312,163,000	▲0.9	
2013	309,511,000	▲0.8	
2012	307,046,000	▲1.9	
2011	301,380,000	▲1.7	
2010	296,458,000	▲1.4	
2009	292,496,000	▼2.0	
2008	298,451,000	▲0.4	Opening of Magok station between Songjeong and Balsan
2007	297,274,000	▼0.9	
2006	300,028,000	▼1.8	
2005	305,608,000	▼2.1	
2004	312,313,000	▲1.8	
2003	306,868,000	▲1.9	
2002	301,195,000	▼0.3	
2001	301,992,000	▲47.8	Vast network expansion of Seoul Metropolitan Subway
2000	204,351,000	▼28.0	
1999	283,667,000	▲43.6	
1998	197,538,000	▲3.1	
1997	191,521,000	-	

== See also ==
- Subways in South Korea
- Seoul Metropolitan Rapid Transit Corporation
- Seoul Metropolitan Subway
