= Hanam =

City in Gyeonggi, South Korea

Coordinates: 37°31′N 127°12′E

- Municipal City
- Panoramic view of Sinjang-dong, Hanam

- Flag Emblem of Hanam

- Location in South Korea
- Country: South Korea
- Region: Gyeonggi Province (Sudogwon)
- Administrative divisions: 13

Area
  - Total: 93.07 km^{2} (35.93 sq mi)

Population (February 2025)
  - Total: 328,412
  - Density: 1,612/km^{2} (4,180/sq mi)
  - Dialect: Seoul

Korean name
- Hangul: 하남시
- Hanja: 河南市
- RR: Hanam-si
- MR: Hanam-si
- Symbols
- Flower: Convallaria keiskei

Hanam (Korean: 하남; Korean pronunciation: [ha.nam]) is a city in Gyeonggi Province, South Korea. Formerly a part of Gwangju County, it was designated a city in 1989. The ancient Baekje capital of Hanam Wiryeseong may have been located there.

Lying immediately east of Seoul, Hanam is also bordered by Namyangju, Gwangju, and Seongnam.

== Administrative divisions ==
Hanam is divided as follows:

- Cheonhyun-dong (천현동)
- Shinjang1-dong (신장1동)
- Shinjang2-dong (신장2동)
- Deokpung1-dong (덕풍1동)
- Deokpung2-dong (덕풍2동)
- Deokpung3-dong (덕풍3동)
- Pungsan-dong (풍산동)
- Misa1-dong (미사1동)
- Misa2-dong (미사2동)
- Gambuk-dong (감북동)
- Gami-dong (감이동)
- Wyrye-dong (위례동)
- Chungung-dong (춘궁동)
- Choi-dong (초이동)

== Statistics ==
| Population (2025): | 328,412 |
| Yearly birth (2018): | 2,039 |
| Yearly death (2018): | 721 |
| Households (2018): | 93,741 |
| Move-in (2017): | 41,988 |
| Move-out (2017): | 25,945 |

== Climate ==
Hanam has a humid continental climate (Köppen: Dwa), but can be considered a borderline humid subtropical climate (Köppen: Cwa) using the −3 °C (27 °F) isotherm.

Climate data for Hanam (2004–2020 normals)
| Month | Jan | Feb | Mar | Apr | May | Jun | Jul | Aug | Sep | Oct | Nov | Dec | Year |
|---|---|---|---|---|---|---|---|---|---|---|---|---|---|
| Mean daily maximum °C (°F) | 2.7 (36.9) | 5.9 (42.6) | 12.1 (53.8) | 18.8 (65.8) | 24.9 (76.8) | 28.7 (83.7) | 29.5 (85.1) | 30.6 (87.1) | 26.2 (79.2) | 21.0 (69.8) | 12.6 (54.7) | 4.1 (39.4) | 18.1 (64.6) |
| Daily mean °C (°F) | −2.4 (27.7) | 0.7 (33.3) | 6.2 (43.2) | 12.4 (54.3) | 18.3 (64.9) | 22.9 (73.2) | 25.1 (77.2) | 26.0 (78.8) | 20.8 (69.4) | 14.2 (57.6) | 7.2 (45.0) | −0.6 (30.9) | 12.6 (54.7) |
| Mean daily minimum °C (°F) | −6.9 (19.6) | −4.3 (24.3) | 0.9 (33.6) | 6.6 (43.9) | 12.4 (54.3) | 18.0 (64.4) | 21.9 (71.4) | 22.3 (72.1) | 16.5 (61.7) | 9.2 (48.6) | 2.5 (36.5) | −5.0 (23.0) | 7.8 (46.0) |
| Average precipitation mm (inches) | 11.6 (0.46) | 18.3 (0.72) | 31.0 (1.22) | 57.2 (2.25) | 66.8 (2.63) | 103.1 (4.06) | 379.1 (14.93) | 230.9 (9.09) | 120.3 (4.74) | 34.5 (1.36) | 42.0 (1.65) | 15.8 (0.62) | 1,110.6 (43.72) |
| Average precipitation days (≥ 0.1 mm) | 3.0 | 3.3 | 5.7 | 7.4 | 6.3 | 7.4 | 13.8 | 12.1 | 6.6 | 3.9 | 6.2 | 4.8 | 80.5 |
Source: Korea Meteorological Administration

== Sister cities ==
- Rushan, Shandong, China
- Little Rock, Arkansas, United States
- Shah Alam, Selangor, Malaysia

== See also ==
- List of cities in South Korea
- Geography of South Korea
- Seoul Capital Area
