= Hanam Geomdansan station =

Metro station in Hanam city, Gyeonggi-do, South Korea

| 하남검단산; Hanam Geomdansan |
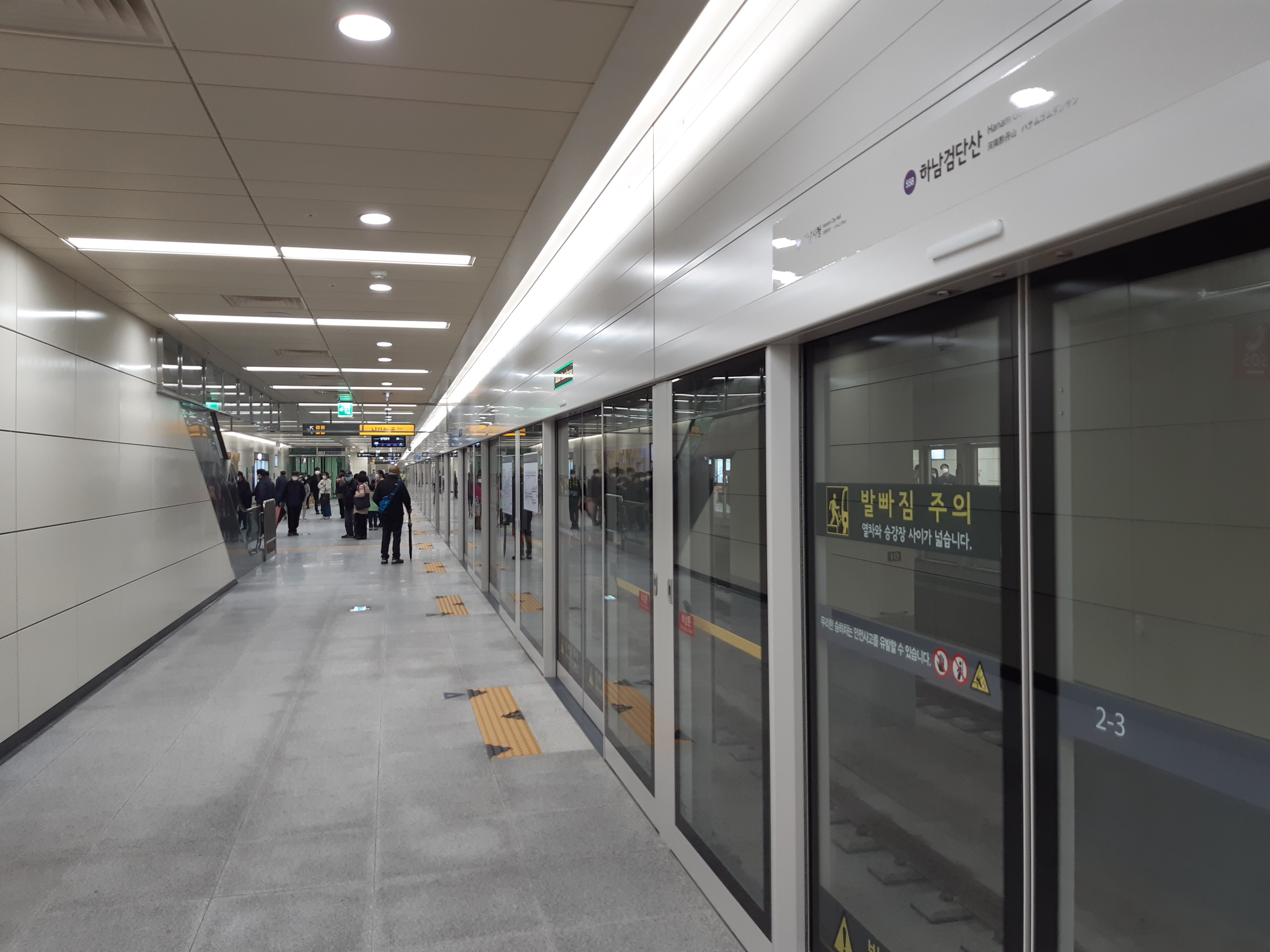

Korean name
- Hangul: 하남검단산역
- Hanja: 河南黔丹山驛
- Revised Romanization: Hanamgeomdansan-yeok
- McCune–Reischauer: Hanamgŏmdansan-yŏk

General information
- Location: 100 Daecheong-ro Jiha, Hanam-si, Gyeonggi-do
- Coordinates: 37°32′23″N 127°13′25″E
- Operated by: Seoul Metro
- Line: Line 5
- Platforms: 2
- Tracks: 2

Construction
- Structure type: Underground

History
- Opened: March 27, 2021

Services
| Preceding station | Seoul Metropolitan Subway | Following station |
|---|---|---|
| Hanam City Hall towards Banghwa | Line 5 | Terminus |
Location

Hanam Geomdansan Station (Korean: 하남검단산역) is a subway station on the Hanam Line of Seoul Subway Line 5 in Hanam-si, Gyeonggi-do.

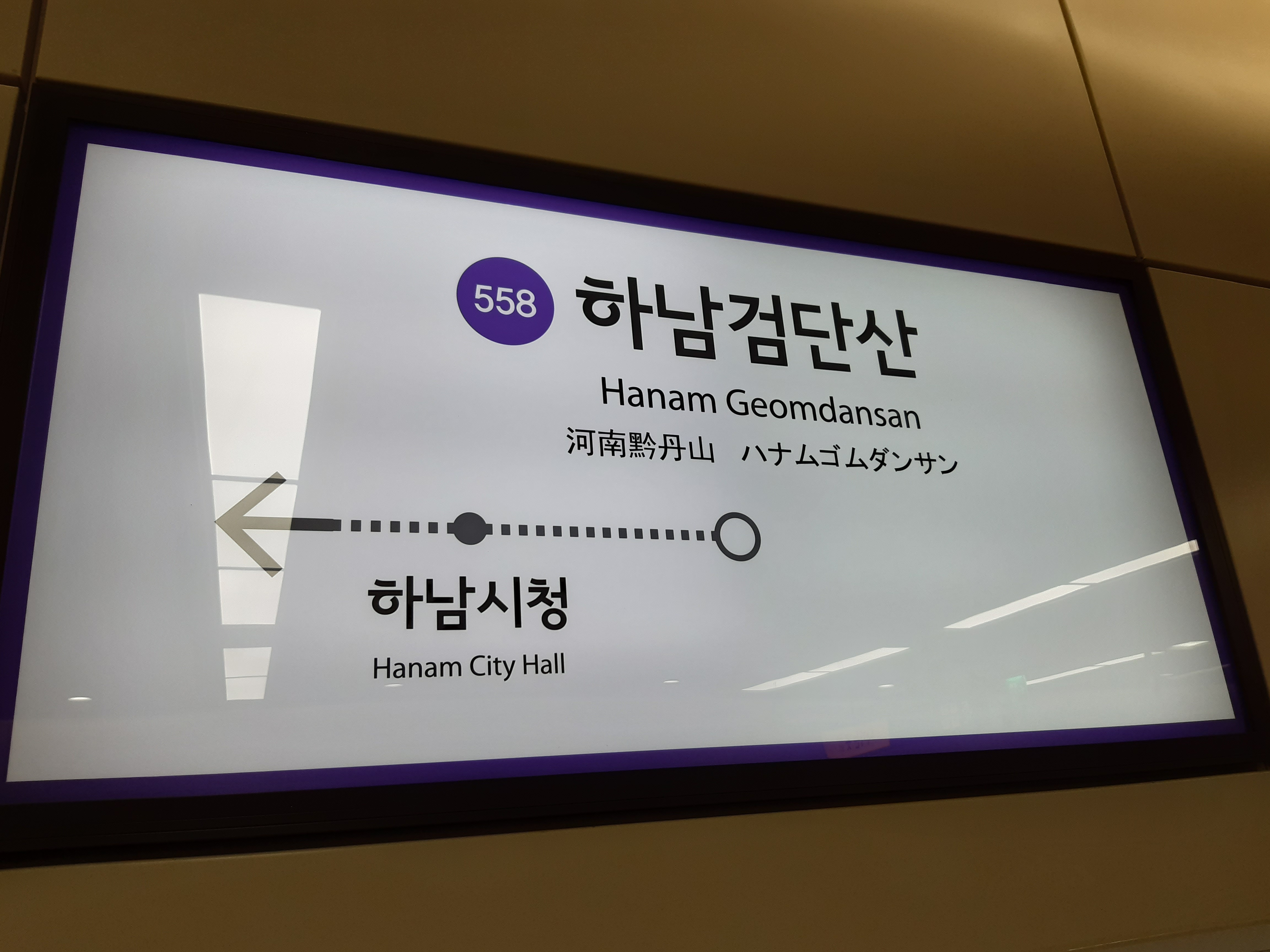

== Station layout ==
| G | Street level | Exit |

| L1; Concourse | Lobby | Customer Service, Shops, Vending machines, ATMs |

| L2; Platforms | Side platform, doors will open on the right |
| L2; Platforms | Westbound | ← Line 5 toward Banghwa (Hanam City Hall) |
| L2; Platforms | Eastbound | Line 5 Alighting Passengers Only → |
| L2; Platforms | Side platform, doors will open on the right |
