= Banghwa station =

Station of the Seoul Metropolitan Subway

Coordinates: 37°34′39″N 126°48′46″E

방화; Banghwa
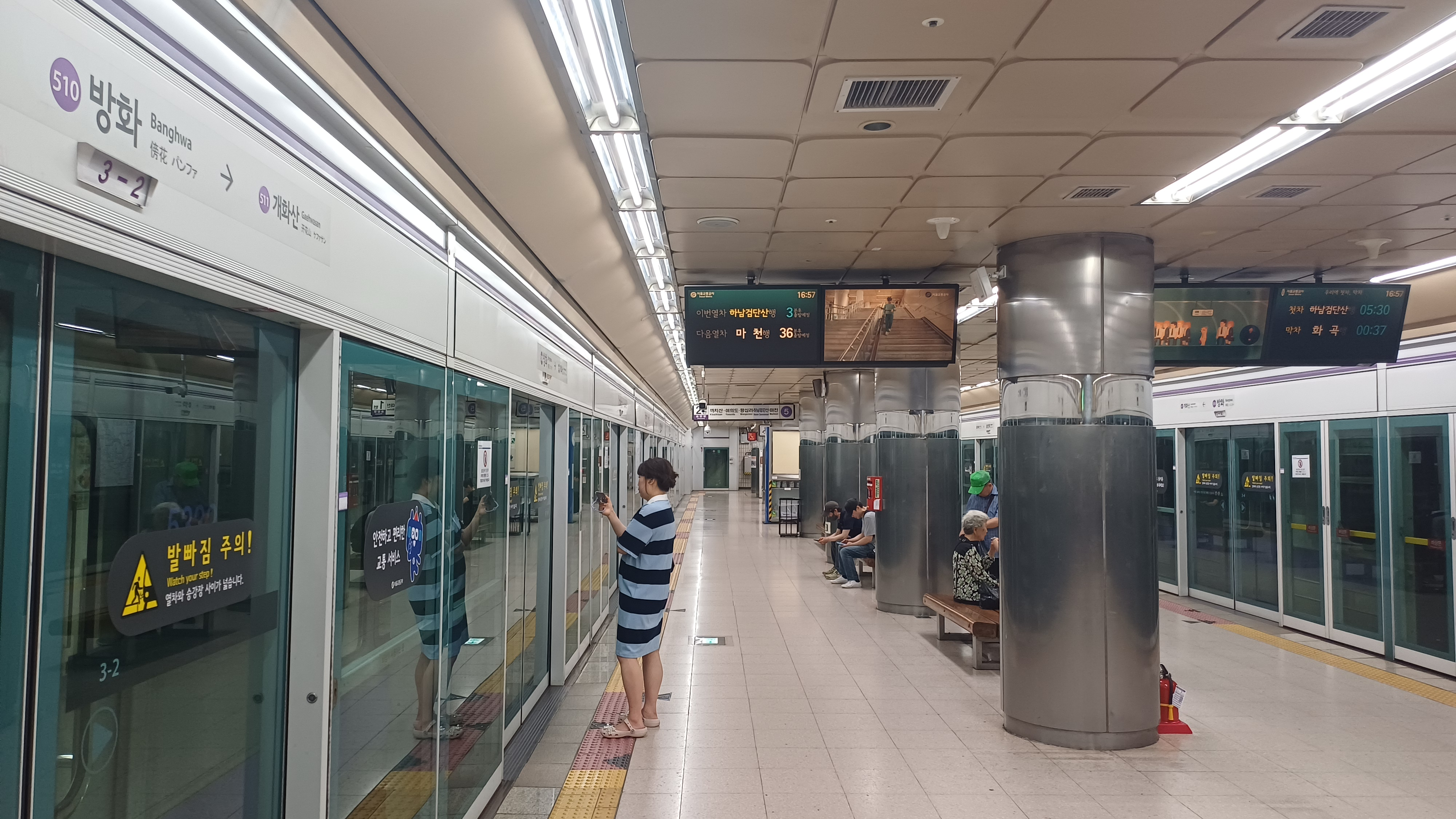
- Station platform

Korean name
- Hangul: 방화역
- Hanja: 傍花驛
- Revised Romanization: Banghwa-yeok
- McCune–Reischauer: Panghwa-yŏk

General information
- Location: Geumnanghwaro Jiha 132, Gangseo-gu, Seoul
- Operator: Seoul Metro
- Line: Line 5
- Platforms: 2
- Tracks: 3

Construction
- Structure type: Underground

History
- Opened: March 20, 1996

Services
Preceding station	Seoul Metropolitan Subway	Following station
Terminus	Line 5	Gaehwasan towards Hanam Geomdansan or Macheon
Location

Banghwa station (Korean: 방화; Hanja: 傍花) is a subway station on Line 5 of the Seoul Metropolitan Subway. Located in Gangseo-gu, Seoul, it is the Western terminus of Line 5.

== Station layout ==
G	Street Level	Exits
L1	Concourse	Faregates, Ticketing Machines, Station Control
L2; Platforms	Eastbound	Line 5 toward Hanam Geomdansan or Macheon (Gaehwasan) →
L2; Platforms	Island platform, doors will open on the left and right
L2; Platforms	Eastbound	Line 5 toward Hanam Geomdansan or Macheon (Gaehwasan) →
L2; Platforms	Island platform, doors will open on the left and right
L2; Platforms	Eastbound	Line 5 toward Hanam Geomdansan or Macheon (Gaehwasan) →

== Vicinity ==
Public Centers:

- Banghwa 1-dong Citizen's Center
- Banghwa 3-dong Citizen's Center
- Banghwa Welfare Center
- Banghwa Police Station
- Banghwa Fire Station
- Banghwa Post Office
- Korean Language Center
- Bangsin Market
- Neuti Park

Schools:

- Chihyeon Elementary School
- Samjeong Elementary School
- Samjeong Middle School
- Bangwon Middle School
- Hanseo High School
- Gangseo Industrial High School
