= Sinjeongnegeori station =

Train station in South Korea

Coordinates: 37°31′12″N 126°51′10″E

신정네거리; Sinjeongnegeori
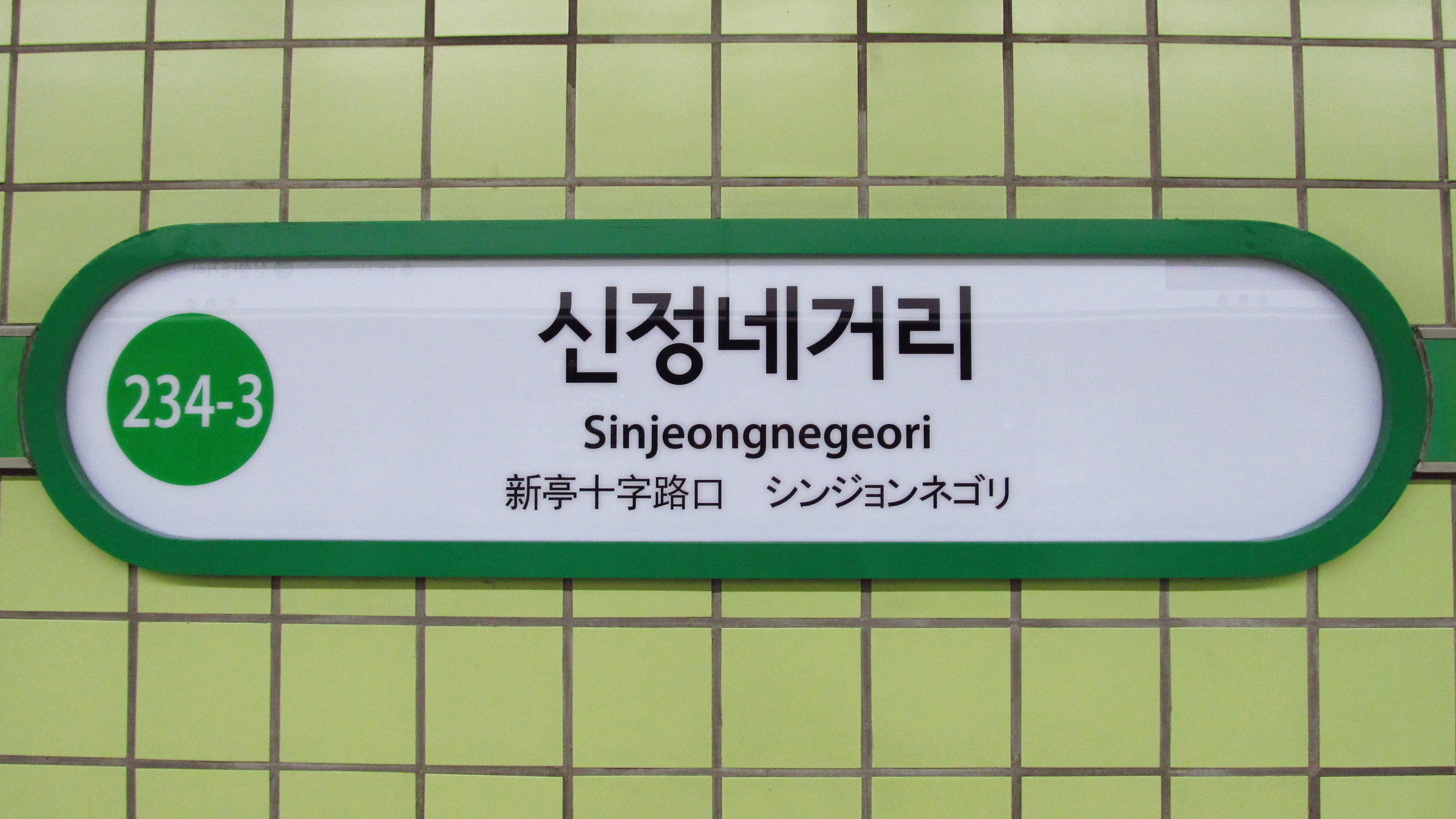

Korean name
- Hangul: 신정네거리역
- Hanja: 新亭네거리驛
- Revised Romanization: Sinjeongnegeori-yeok
- McCune–Reischauer: Sinjŏngnegŏri-yŏk

General information
- Location: 261 Jungang-ro Jiha, 1231 Sinjeong 3-dong, Yangcheon-gu, Seoul
- Operated by: Seoul Metro
- Line(s): Line 2
- Platforms: 2
- Tracks: 2

Construction
- Structure type: Underground

History
- Opened: February 29, 1996

Passengers
- (Daily) Based on Jan-Dec of 2012. Line 2: 23,174

Services
Preceding station	Seoul Metropolitan Subway	Following station
Yangcheon-gu Office towards Sindorim	Line 2 Sinjeong Branch	Kkachisan Terminus

Sinjeongnegeori Station is a station on the Sinjeong Branch of Seoul Subway Line 2. In English, the name of the station is "four-way junction in Sinjeong-dong."
