= Dorimcheon station =

Station on the Sinjeong Branch of the Seoul Subway Line 2

Coordinates: 37°30′52″N 126°52′58″E

도림천; Dorimcheon
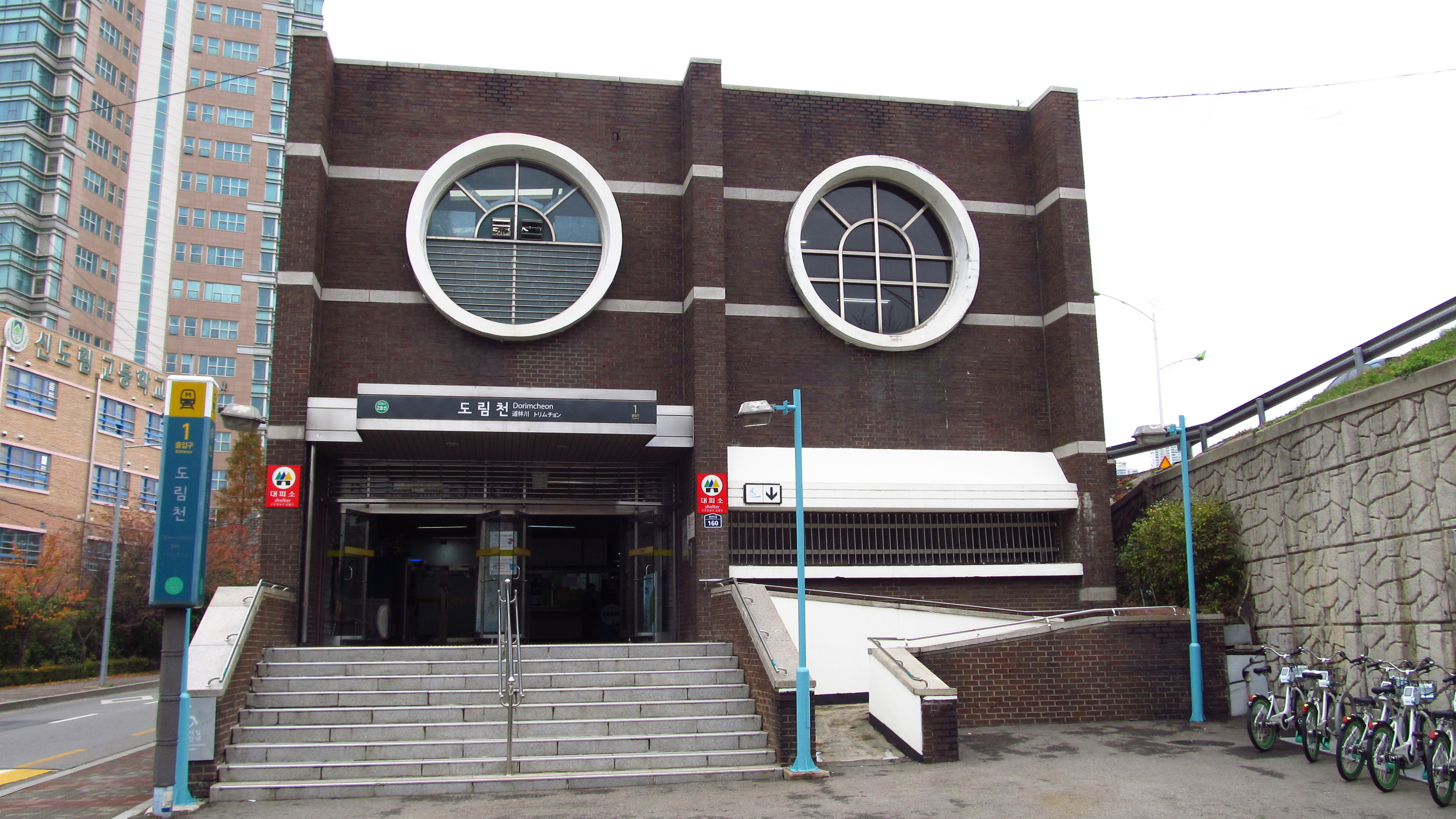

Korean name
- Hangul: 도림천역
- Hanja: 道林川驛
- Revised Romanization: Dorimcheon-yeok
- McCune–Reischauer: Torimch'ŏn-yŏk

General information
- Location: 160 Gyeongin-ro 67-gil, 323-16 Sindorim-dong, Guro-gu, Seoul
- Operated by: Seoul Metro
- Line(s): Line 2
- Platforms: 2
- Tracks: 2

Construction
- Structure type: Underground

History
- Opened: May 22, 1992

Passengers
- (Daily) Based on Jan-Dec of 2012. Line 2: 2,004

Services
Preceding station	Seoul Metropolitan Subway	Following station
Sindorim Terminus	Line 2 Sinjeong Branch	Yangcheon-gu Office towards Kkachisan

Dorimcheon (Korean: 도림천역) is a station on the Sinjeong Branch of the Seoul Subway Line 2. It is the least-used station on Line 2. This station is located in Sindorim-dong, Guro District, Seoul.

== Vicinity ==
- Exit 1 : Sindorim Elementary School
- Exit 2 : Anyang River
