= Yangcheon-gu Office station =

Station of the Seoul Metropolitan Subway

Coordinates: 37°30′44″N 126°51′56″E

양천구청; Yangcheon-gu Office
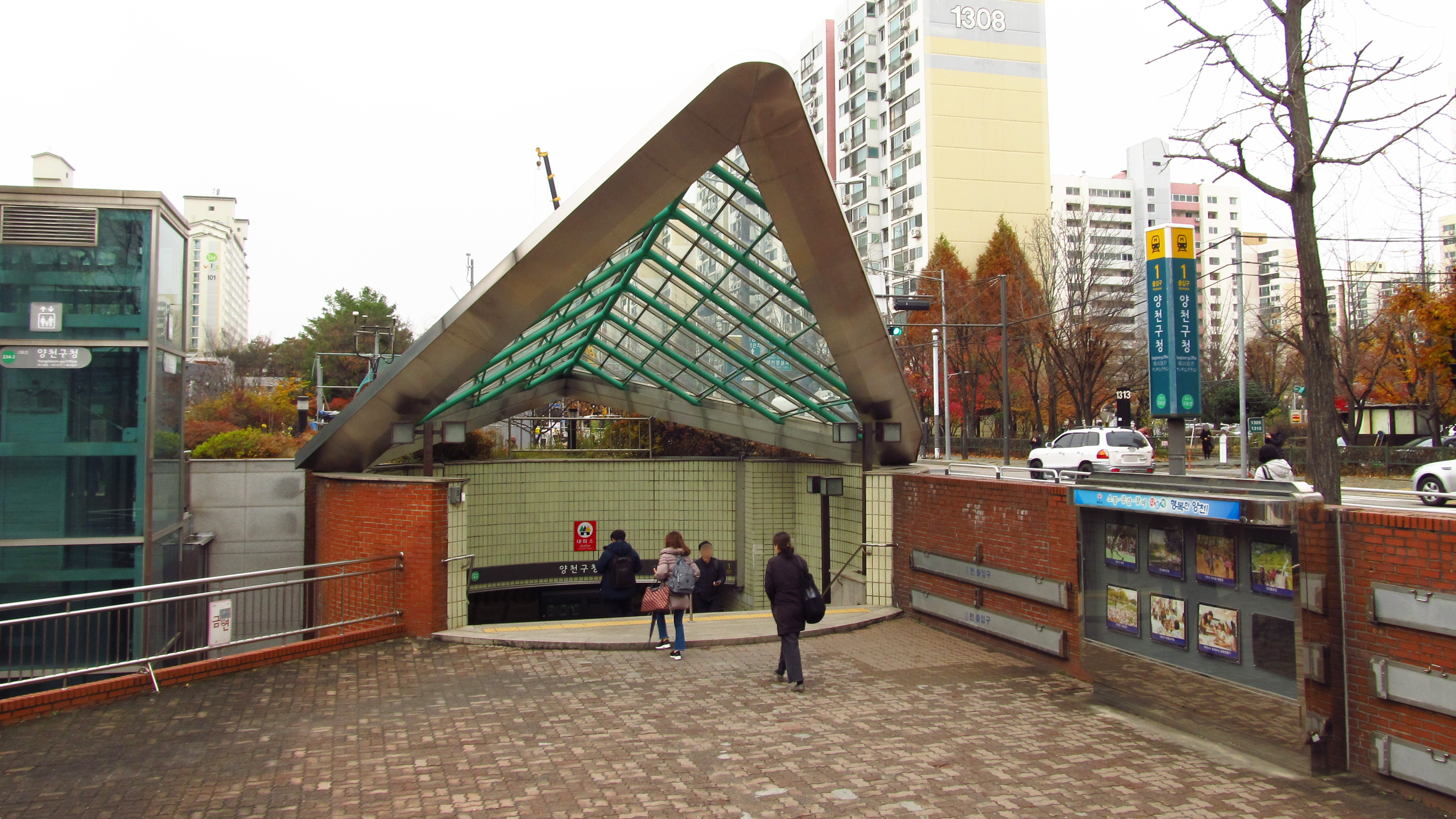
- Exit 1

Korean name
- Hangul: 양천구청역
- Hanja: 陽川區廳驛
- Revised Romanization: Yangcheongucheong-yeok
- McCune–Reischauer: Yangch'ŏnguch'ŏng-yŏk

General information
- Location: 33 Mokdong-ro 3-gil jiha, 165-1 Sinjeong 7-dong, Yangcheon-gu, Seoul
- Operated by: Seoul Metro
- Line: Line 2
- Platforms: 2
- Tracks: 2

Construction
- Structure type: Underground

History
- Opened: May 22, 1992

Passengers
- (Daily) Based on Jan-Dec of 2012. Line 2: 16,078

Services
Preceding station	Seoul Metropolitan Subway	Following station
Dorimcheon towards Sindorim	Line 2 Sinjeong Branch	Sinjeongnegeori towards Kkachisan
Location

Yangcheon-gu Office Station is a station on the Sinjeong Branch of the Seoul Subway Line 2. This station is located in Sinjeong-dong, Yangcheon-gu, Seoul. It is named after the city hall of Yangcheon-gu district; Yangcheon means "sunny stream".

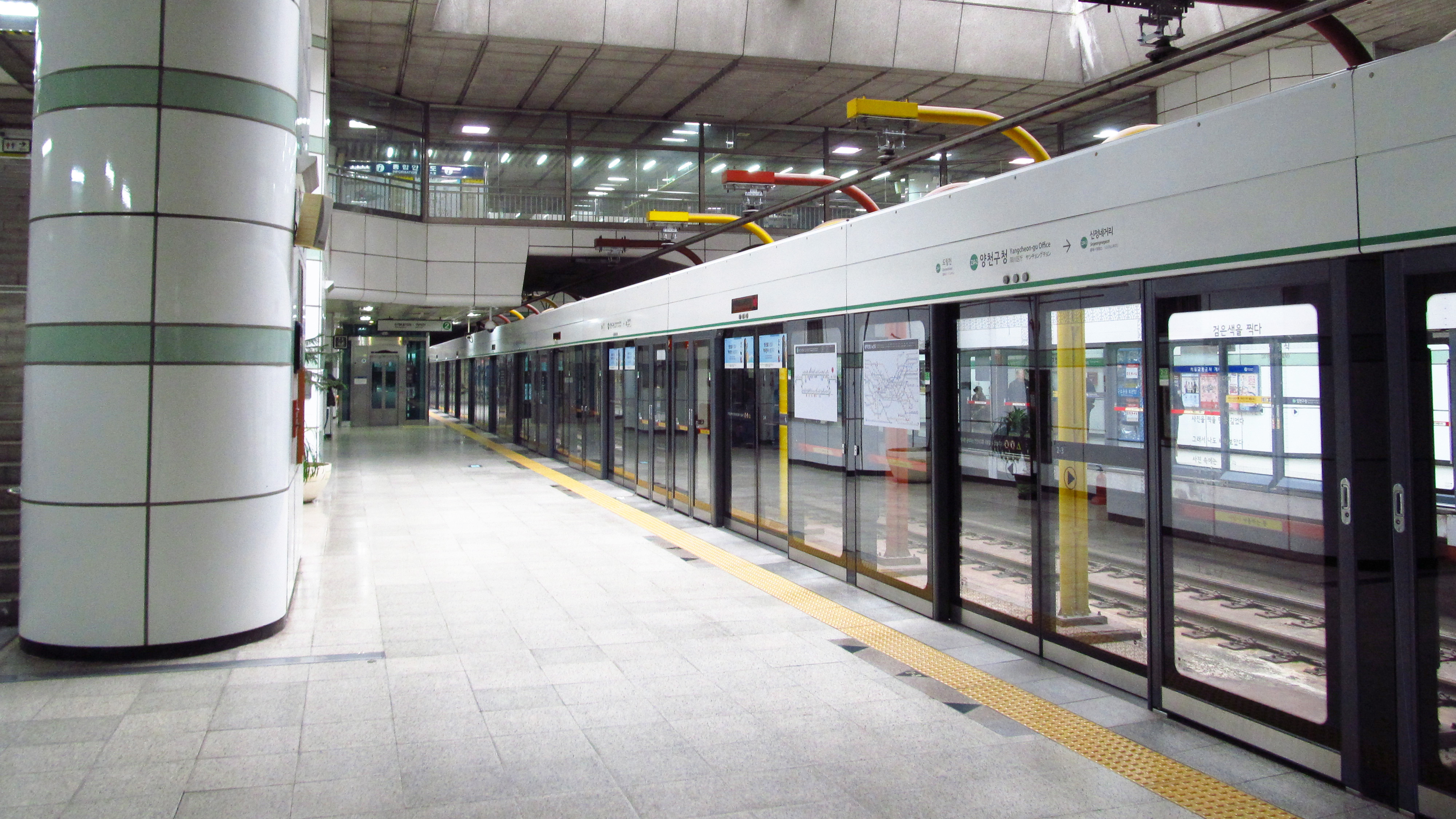
Platform

== Neighborhood ==
- Seoul Metro Sinjeong Train Depot
