= Kim Soo-young (politician) =

South Korean politician

- 김수영

Mayor of Yangcheon District
- In office 1 July 2014 – June 30, 2022
- Preceded by: Choo Jae-yup
- Succeeded by: Lee Ki-jae

Personal details
- Born: 5 December 1964 (age 61)
- Party: Democratic
- Education: Ewha Womans University; Sogang University; Soongsil University

Kim Soo-young (Korean: 김수영; Hanja: 金水英; born 5 December 1964) is a South Korean politician who served as Mayor of Yangcheon District, Seoul and its first woman mayor from July 2014 to June 2022.

From 2006 to 2008, she worked as the first head of Siheung's women's job center run by Ministry of Gender Equality and Family.

From 2012 to 2014 Kim was the adjunct professor of social welfare at Soongsil University.

== Education ==
Kim holds three degrees - a bachelor in Korean language from Ewha Womans University, a master's in social welfare policy from Sogang University and a doctorate in social welfare from Soongsil University.

== Political career ==
Kim was the president of student union of Ewha Womans University in late 1980s and imprisoned for student activism against authoritarian regime of Chun Doo-hwan. She then worked as a member of pro-democracy student organisation supportive of Kim Dae-jung's presidential candidacy.

She took multiple roles in her party such as a member of human rights committee of Kim Dae-jung's third presidential campaign in 1992, a director of Women's Affairs Bureau of her party, then-Uri Party, from 2004 to 2006 and vice president of Women's leadership centre of her party, then-New Politics Alliance for Democracy.

=== Mayor of Yangcheon District ===
In 2011 Kim ran for Mayor of Yangcheon against Choo Jae-yup (Korean: 추재엽) in the by-election held after her husband and then-mayor, Lee Jae-hak (Korean: 이제학), was sentenced guilty by the Supreme Court for spreading lies about Choo, then the opposing candidate, during campaign. In 2013 Choo who has served as Mayor of Yangcheon three times non-consecutively was removed from the post after the Supreme Court sentenced him guilty for Perjury during Lee's trial and breaking election law after it is reasonable to believe Lee's "lie" that Choo actually waterboarded people while working for Army Counterintelligence Corps.

In an interview, she said she had dreamed of becoming an elected official of local government and then member of the National Assembly and would have run for elected post regardless of her marriage.

In 2014, Kim ran for Mayor again and won becoming the only woman among 20 democratic mayors in Seoul and the first woman to lead Yangcheon.

In 2018, Kim became the first Yangcheon mayor to be elected twice consecutively. She is also the first woman from her party or its preceding parties to be elected twice for head of local government in South Korea.

== Electoral history ==
Election	Year	Post	Party affiliation	Votes	Percentage of votes	Results
By-election	2011	Mayor of Seoul Yangcheon District	Democratic Party (2008)	74,514	38.54%	Lost (2nd)
6th Local Election	2014	Mayor of Seoul Yangcheon District	New Politics Alliance for Democracy (NPAD)	111,738	47.90%	Won
7th Local Election	2018	Mayor of Seoul Yangcheon District	Democratic Party (2015)	143,583	61.0%	Won
8th Local Election	2022	Mayor of Seoul Yangcheon District	Democratic Party (2015)	91,367	43.97%	Lost (2nd)
