= Hwagok station =

Metro station in South Korea

Coordinates: 37°32′30″N 126°50′25″E

화곡; Hwagok
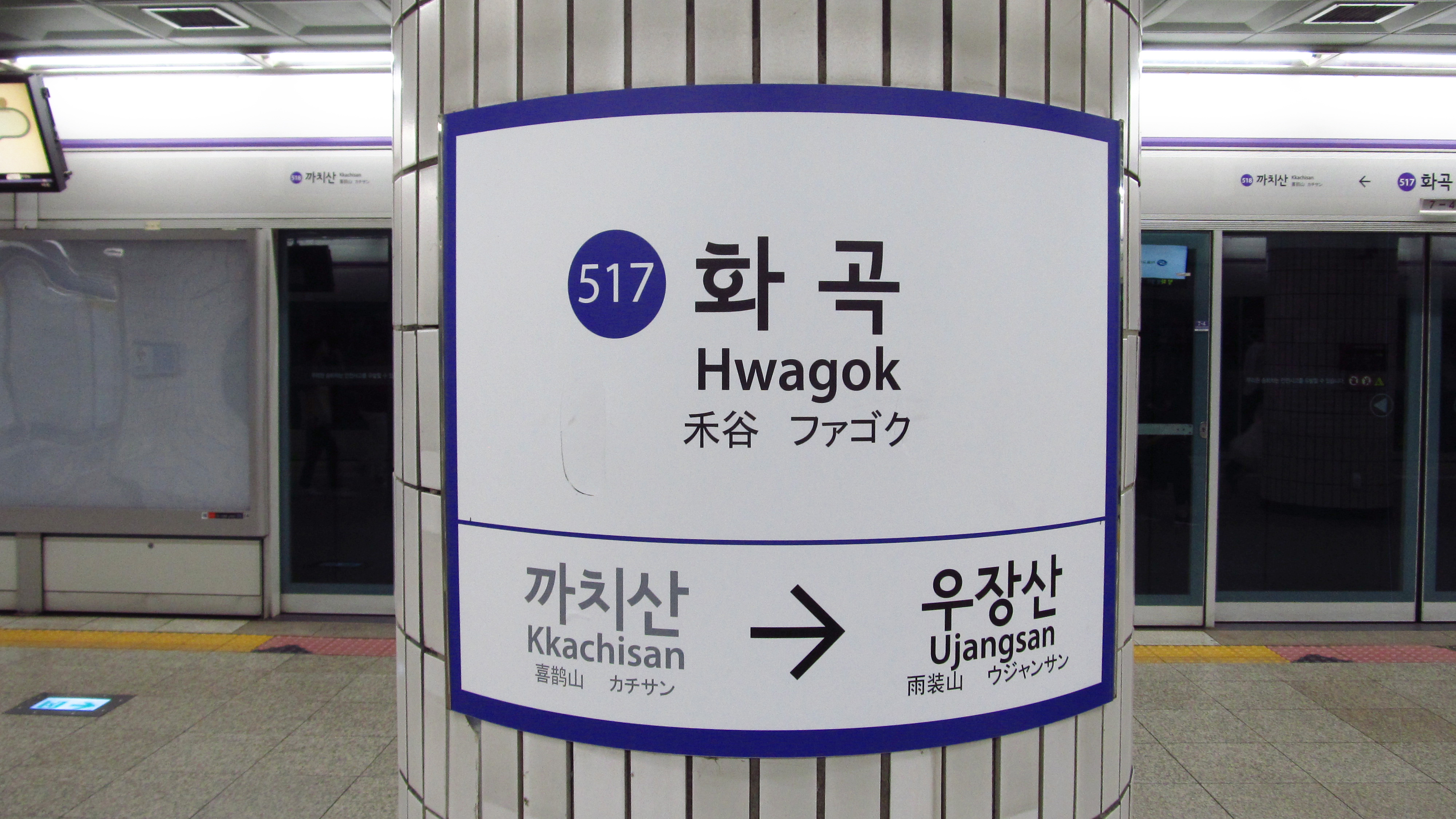

Korean name
- Hangul: 화곡역
- Hanja: 禾谷驛
- Revised Romanization: Hwagok-yeok
- McCune–Reischauer: Hwagok-yŏk

General information
- Location: 1089-54 Hwagok 7-dong, 168 Hwagok-ro Jiha; Gangseo-gu, Seoul
- Operator: Seoul Metro
- Line: Line 5
- Platforms: 1
- Tracks: 2

Construction
- Structure type: Underground

History
- Opened: March 20, 1996

Services
Preceding station	Seoul Metropolitan Subway	Following station
Ujangsan towards Banghwa	Line 5	Kkachisan towards Hanam Geomdansan or Macheon
Location

Hwagok Station is a station on Seoul Subway Line 5 in Gangseo District, Seoul, South Korea.

== Station layout ==
G	Street level	Exit

L1; Concourse	Lobby	Customer Service, Shops, Vending machines, ATMs

L2; Platforms	Westbound	← Line 5 toward Banghwa (Ujangsan)
L2; Platforms	Island platform, doors will open on the left
L2; Platforms	Eastbound	Line 5 toward Hanam Geomdansan or Macheon (Kkachisan)→
