= Sinjeong-dong, Yangcheon =

Sinjeong-dong
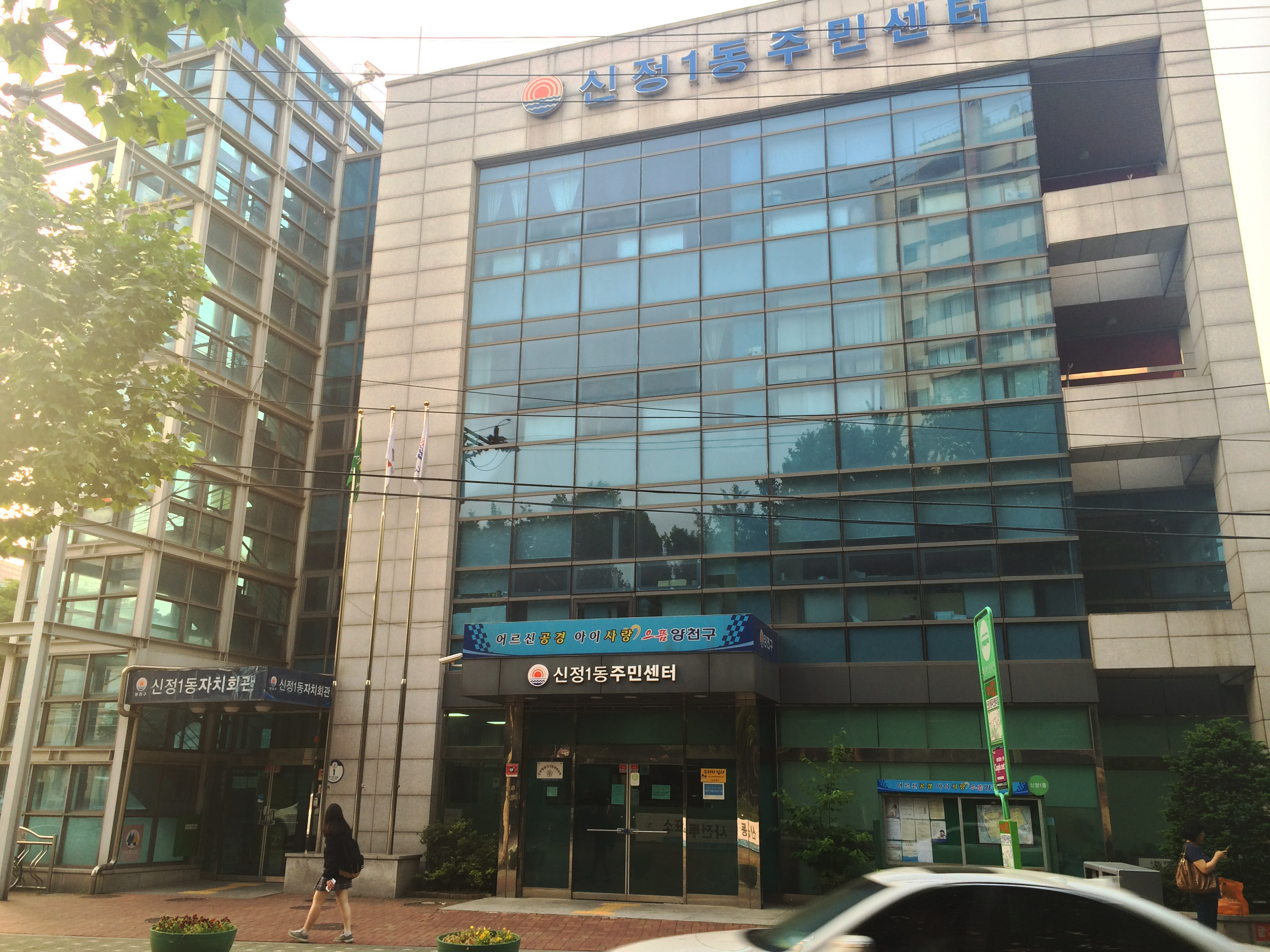
- Sinjeong 1-dong Comunity Service Center (Yangcheon-gu)
- Country: South Korea

Area
  - Total: 6.93 km^{2} (2.68 sq mi)

Population (2024)
  - Total: 170,958
  - Density: 26,371.57/km^{2} (68,302.1/sq mi)

Korean name
- Hangul: 신정동
- Hanja: 新亭洞
- RR: Sinjeong-dong
- MR: Sinjŏng-dong

Sinjeong-dong (Korean: 신정동) is a dong (neighbourhood) of Yangcheon District, Seoul, South Korea.

== History ==
The region was part of Jechapaui-hyeon (제차파의현, 齊次巴衣縣, can be translated either as "Jechapaui-prefecture" or "Jechapaui county"), when it was ruled by Goguryeo. The word jecha has the meaning of ancestral rites and the word paui has the meaning of "rock", and the region was also used by the Baekje kingdom as a place to perform rituals by the king when the kingdom of Baekje still had its capital in modern day Seoul. In 757, the region was part of the administrative division of Gongam-hyeon which later was administered under the administrative division of Yuljin-gun. The region was called yangcheonhyeon during the Goryeo period. Before the liberation of korea in 1945, during the Japanese colonial period, there were five towns in the region, which were Sinteuri, Eunhaengjeong, Okumri, Tansan, and Chungcheonhchon. The town of chungcheongchon was formed because of a mass influx of people from the Chungcheong Province that was brought by the Japanese colonial administration to build a dike to prevent floods from the nearby Anyangcheon river stream, and tansan was created as a result of land reclamation project conducted by the colonial authorities. The dong was named after two of the oldest towns in the region called "Sinteuri" and "Eunhaengjeong".

== Government ==
The area is home to the main district office of Yangcheon District, known as the Yangcheon-gu Office, which gave its name to the eponymous station on Seoul Subway Line 2.

== Transportation ==
Sinjeong-dong is served by two subway lines, Seoul Subway Line 2 and Seoul Subway Line 5, with three stations located in the area: Yangcheon-gu Office station, Sinjeongnegeori station, and Sinjeong station.

== See also ==
- Administrative divisions of South Korea
