= West Seoul Lake Park =

Park in Seoul, South Korea

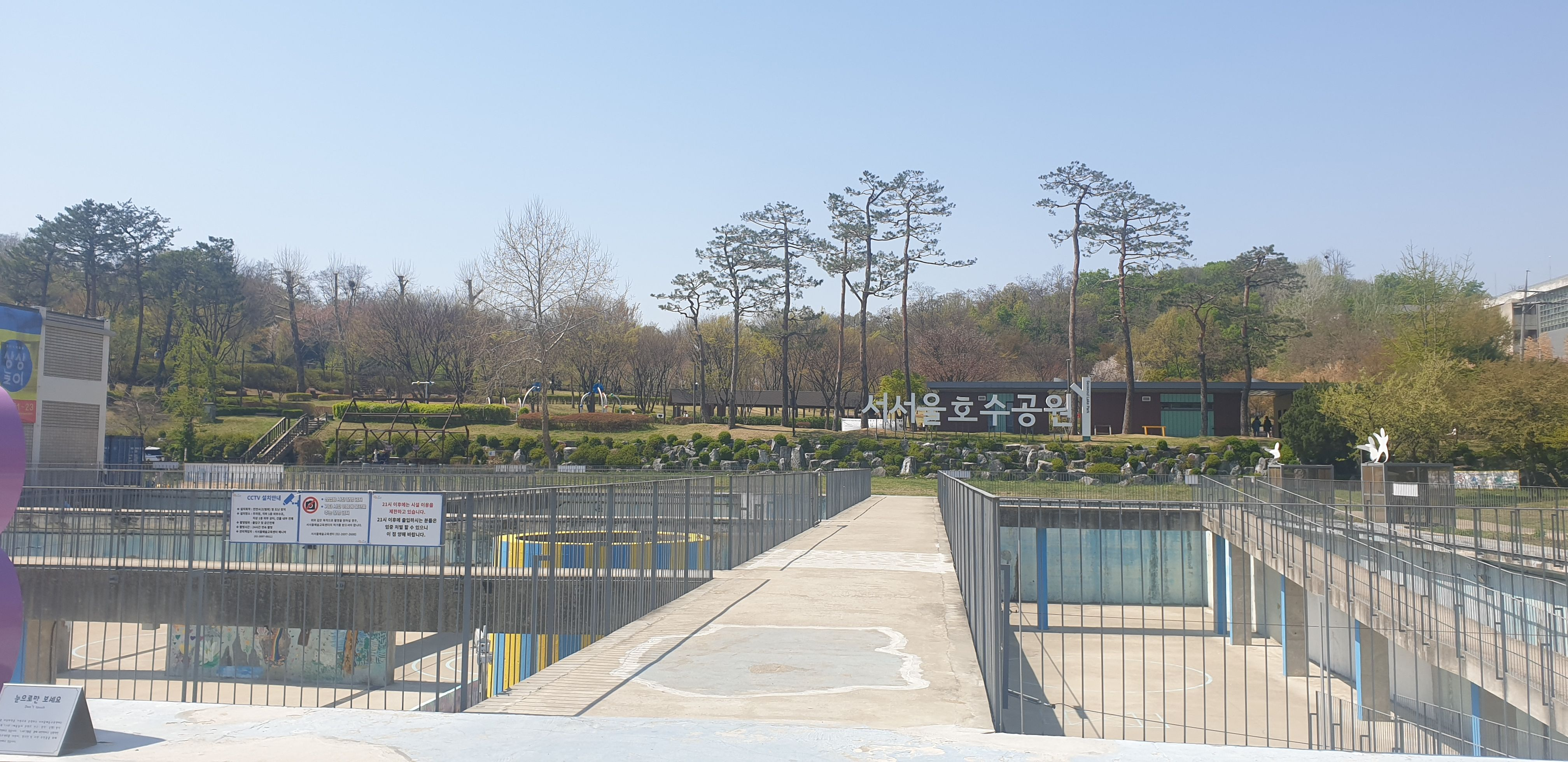
- The park's entrance (2023)
- Interactive map of West Seoul Lake Park
- Coordinates: 37.5276°N 126.8297°E
- Opened: 2009

West Seoul Lake Park (Korean: 서서울호수공원; Hanja: 西서울湖水公園) is a park located in the Yangcheon District of Seoul, South Korea, which opened in 2009. It won an honor award in the general design category of the 2011 American Society of Landscape Architects Professional Awards.

West Seoul Lake Park contains a population of raccoon dogs due to its green spaces, hiding spots under decks and water-friendly areas.
