= Ujangsan station =

Station of the Seoul Metropolitan Subway

Coordinates: 37°32′56″N 126°50′11″E

우장산; Ujangsan
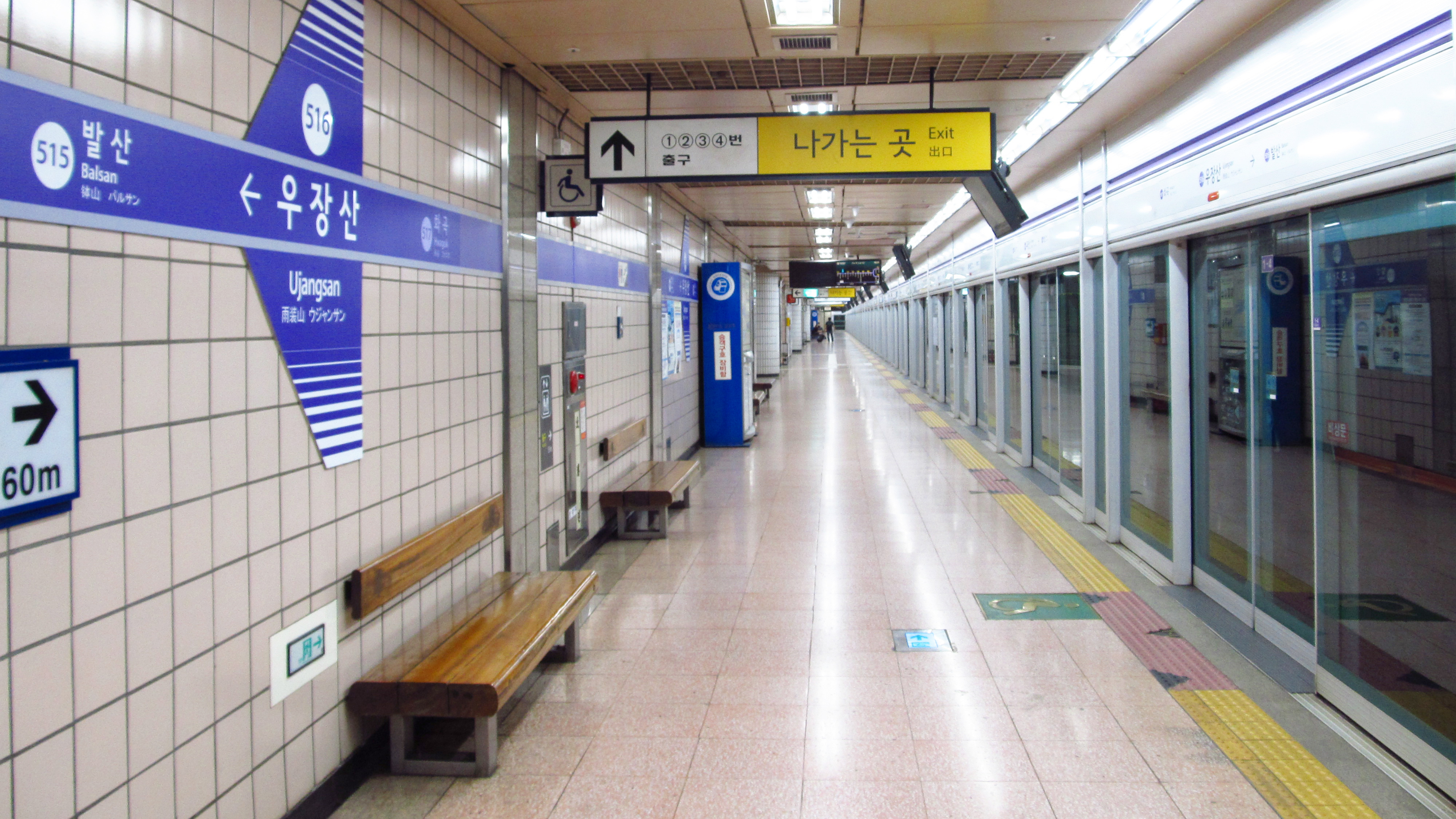
- Station platform in September 2018

Korean name
- Hangul: 우장산역
- Hanja: 雨裝山驛
- Revised Romanization: Ujangsan-yeok
- McCune–Reischauer: Ujangsan-yŏk

General information
- Location: 723 Naebalsan-dong, 262 Gangseo-ro Jiha; Gangseo-gu, Seoul
- Operator: Seoul Metro
- Line: Line 5
- Platforms: 2
- Tracks: 2

Construction
- Structure type: Underground

History
- Opened: March 20, 1996

Services
Preceding station	Seoul Metropolitan Subway	Following station
Balsan towards Banghwa	Line 5	Hwagok towards Hanam Geomdansan or Macheon
Location

Ujangsan Station is a station on the Seoul Subway Line 5 in Gangseo-gu, Seoul. It is named after a nearby mountain to the east.

This station is notable for being the first one operated by Seoul Metro to have platform screen doors.

== Station layout ==
G	Street level	Exit

L1; Concourse	Lobby	Customer Service, Shops, Vending machines, ATMs

L2; Platforms	Side platform, doors will open on the right
L2; Platforms	Westbound	← Line 5 toward Banghwa (Balsan)
L2; Platforms	Eastbound	Line 5 toward Hanam Geomdansan or Macheon (Hwagok)→
L2; Platforms	Side platform, doors will open on the right

== Vicinity ==
- Exit 1 : Ujangsan Park, Naebalsan Elementary School
- Exit 2 : Korea Polytechnic College (Gangseo Campus)
- Exit 3 : Hwagok Middle & High Schools
- Exit 4 : Balsan Elementary School

== See also ==
- Ujangsan
