= Mullae station =

Underground station on Seoul Subway Line 2

Coordinates: 37°31′08″N 126°53′42″E

문래 (김안과병원); Mullae (Kim's Eye Hospital)
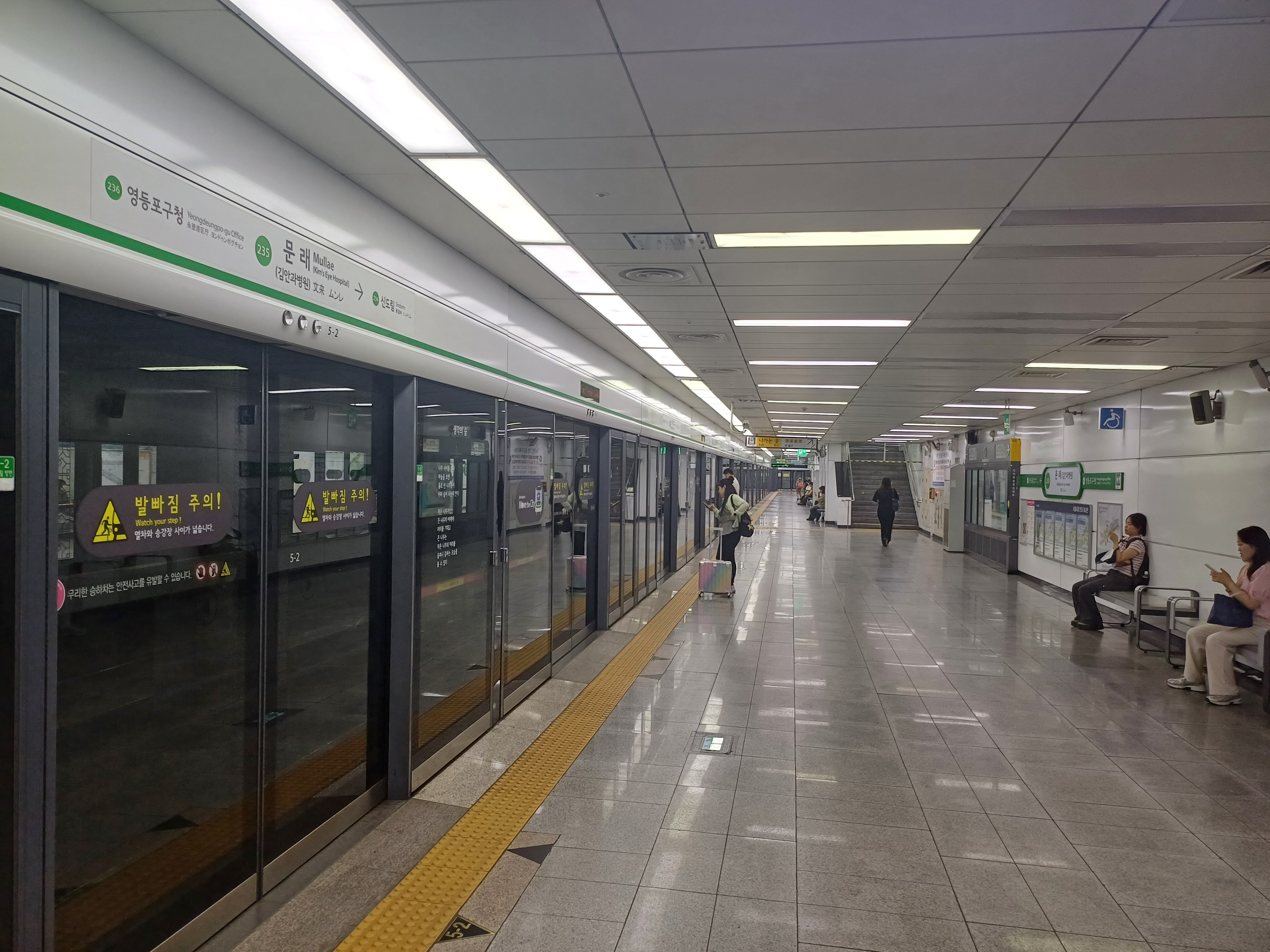

Korean name
- Hangul: 문래역
- Hanja: 文來驛
- Revised Romanization: Mullae-yeok
- McCune–Reischauer: Mullae-yŏk

General information
- Location: 68-1 Mullae 3-dong, 28 Dangsanno, Yeongdeungpo-gu, Seoul
- Operator: Seoul Metro
- Line: Line 2
- Platforms: 2
- Tracks: 2

Construction
- Structure type: Underground

History
- Opened: May 22, 1984

Passengers
- (Daily) Based on Jan-Dec of 2012. Line 2: 38,329

Services
Preceding station	Seoul Metropolitan Subway	Following station
Sindorim Next counterclockwise	Line 2	Yeongdeungpo-gu Office Next clockwise
Location

Mullae Station is an underground station on Seoul Subway Line 2. There is a 24-hour Home plus immediately outside Exit 4. It also serves various apartment complexes and factories. Close to Exit 7 is the street where some scenes in Avengers: Age of Ultron were filmed.

== Station layout ==
G	Street level	Exit

L1; Concourse	Lobby	Customer Service, Shops, Vending machines, ATMs

L2; Platform level	Side platform, doors will open on the right
L2; Platform level	Outer circle	← Line 2 Next counterclockwise (Sindorim)
L2; Platform level	Inner circle	Line 2 Next clockwise (Yeongdeungpo-gu Office) →
L2; Platform level	Side platform, doors will open on the right
