= Magok station =

Train station in South Korea

마곡; Magok
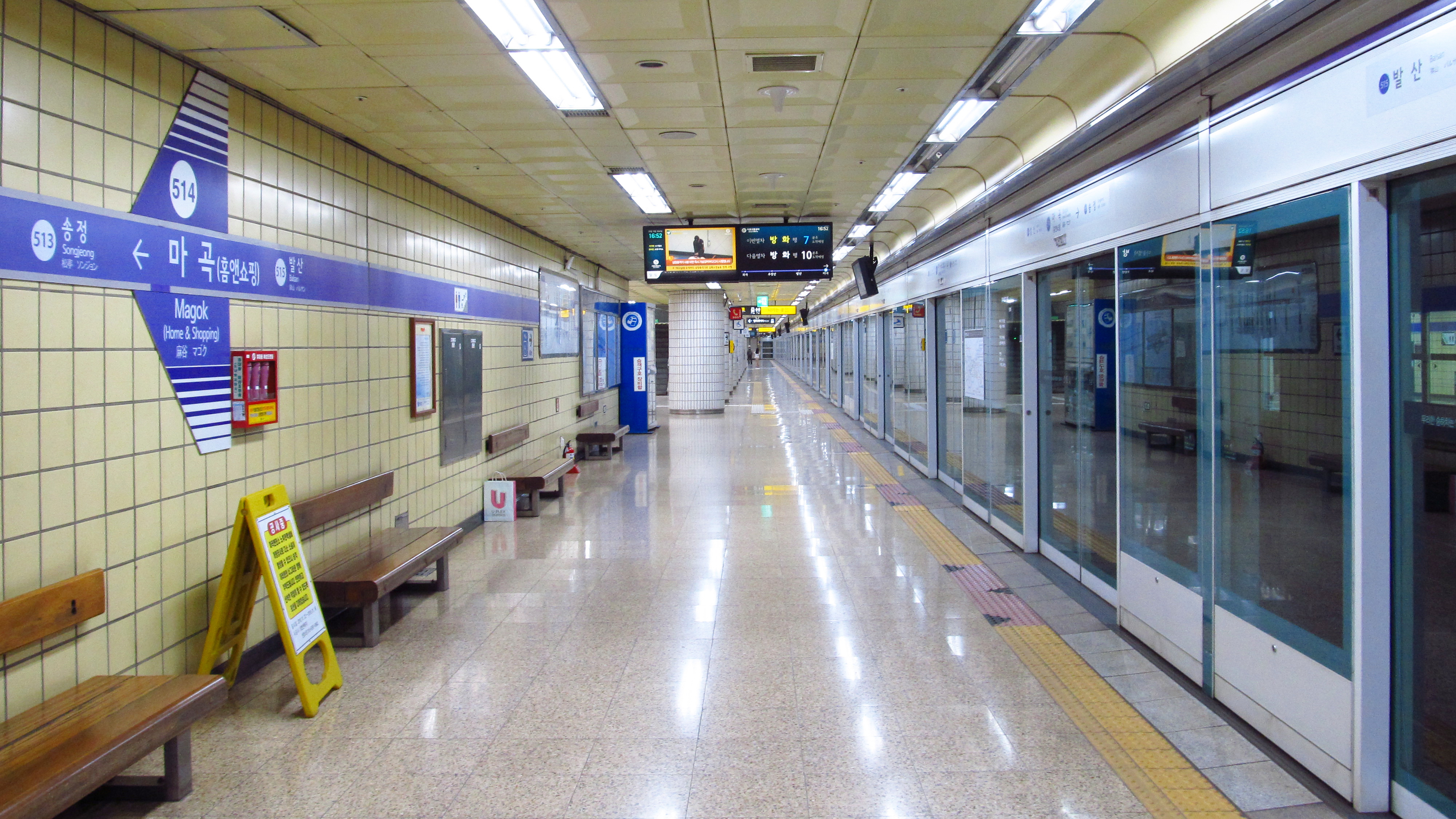
- Station platform in September 2018

Korean name
- Hangul: 마곡역
- Hanja: 麻谷驛
- Revised Romanization: Magongnyeok
- McCune–Reischauer: Magongnyŏk

General information
- Location: 530-6 Gayang-dong, 163 Gonghangdae-ro Jiha; Gangseo-gu, Seoul
- Coordinates: 37°33′36.6″N 126°49′31.5″E
- Operator: Seoul Metro
- Line: Line 5
- Platforms: 2
- Tracks: 2

Construction
- Structure type: Underground

History
- Opened: June 20, 2008

Services
Preceding station	Seoul Metropolitan Subway	Following station
Songjeong towards Banghwa	Line 5	Balsan towards Hanam Geomdansan or Macheon
Location

Magok Station is a subway station of Seoul Subway Line 5. It was opened in 2008, much later than the rest of Line 5, because the area underwent a significant redevelopment transforming a previously largely residential area into a completely new core city with the headquarters and R&D centers of major multinationals such as LG and Lotte, Seoul's first botanic garden, a major Ewha Womans University hospital and large apartment complexes.

Initially opened with only one exit, the station now features seven exits and is right next to a major BRT bus stop.

== Station layout ==
G	Street level	Exit

L1; Concourse	Lobby	Customer Service, Shops, Vending machines, ATMs

L2; Platforms	Side platform, doors will open on the right
L2; Platforms	Westbound	← Line 5 toward Banghwa (Songjeong)
L2; Platforms	Eastbound	Line 5 toward Hanam Geomdansan or Macheon (Balsan)→
L2; Platforms	Side platform, doors will open on the right

== History ==
1. March 20, 1996, Operates as a non-stop transit station with the opening of the section between Banghwa Station and Kkachi Mountain Station on Seoul Subway Line 5 (business postponed indefinitely)
2. 20 June 2008, Open for business with opening of Magok Station
3. January 7, 2010, Elevator commences operation
4. January 9, 2016, Change from exit 1 to exit 2 and new exits 1, 6 and 7
5. October 5, 2020, New exits 3, 4, and 5
