= International Seon Center =

Buddhist temple in South Korea

- 국제선센터
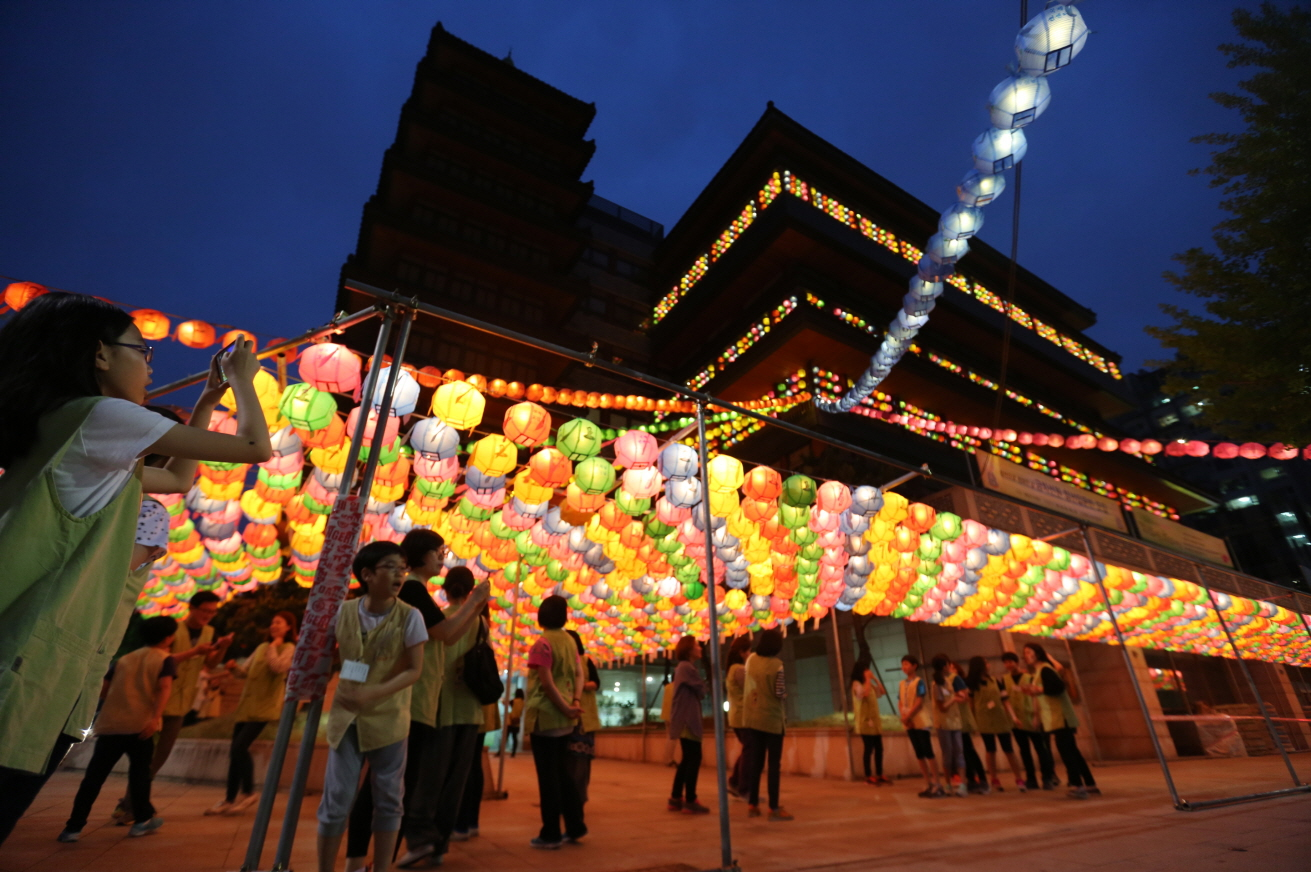
- View of International Seon Center in South Korea

Religion
- Affiliation: Jogye Order of Korean Buddhism

Location
- Location: 167, Mokdongdong-ro, Yangcheon-gu, Seoul
- Country: South Korea
- Interactive map of International Seon Center
- Coordinates: 37°31′18.0″N 126°52′12.1″E

International Seon Center (Korean: 국제선센터) is a Buddhist temple in Yangcheon District, Seoul, South Korea. It opened in November 2010 under direct management of the Jogye Order of Korean Buddhism.

The Center is in a new "planned city" in Mok-dong, with 10,500 square metres (113,000 ft^{2}) of floor space, standing seven stories above ground and three stories below. It is located near Yangcheon Park, the Anyangcheon river and the Seonyudo Island.

The Center provides programs for visitors on Buddhist and traditional culture such as Ganhwa Seon practice, Seon cultural classes and temple food. It also offers temple stay programs where visitors can experience Buddhist culture.

== Gallery ==
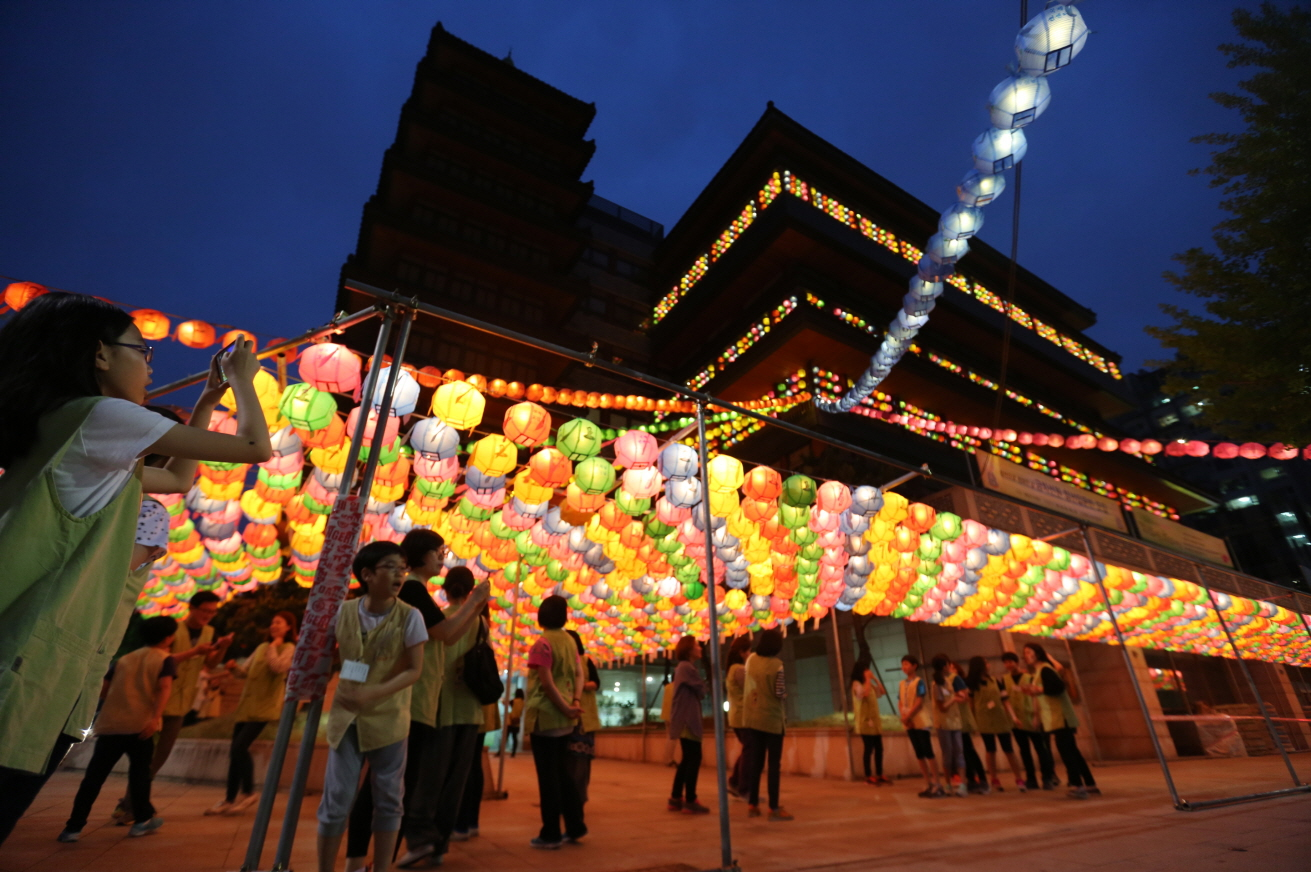

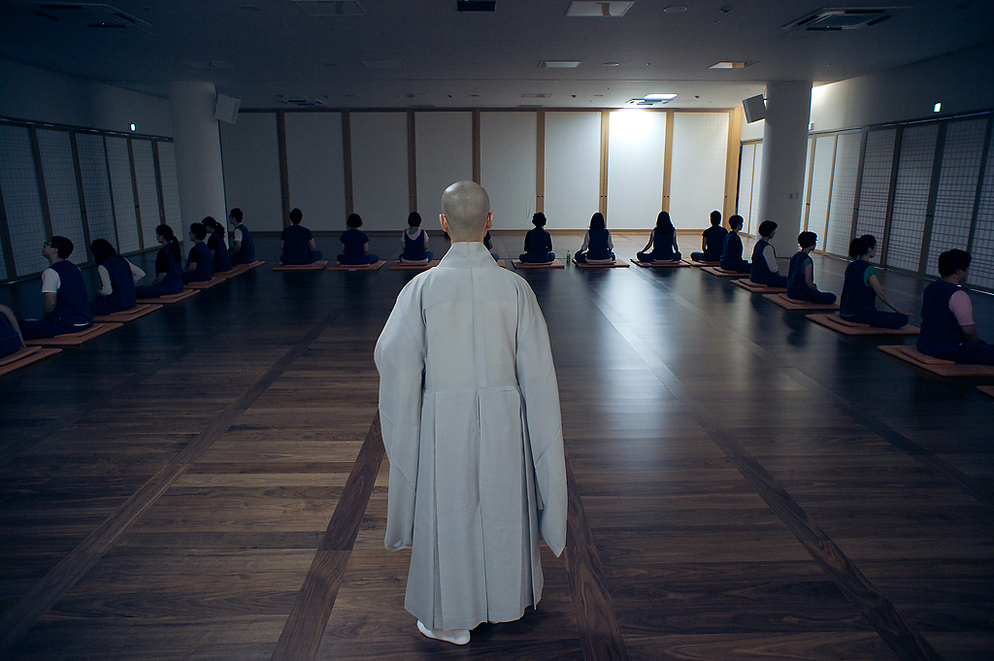

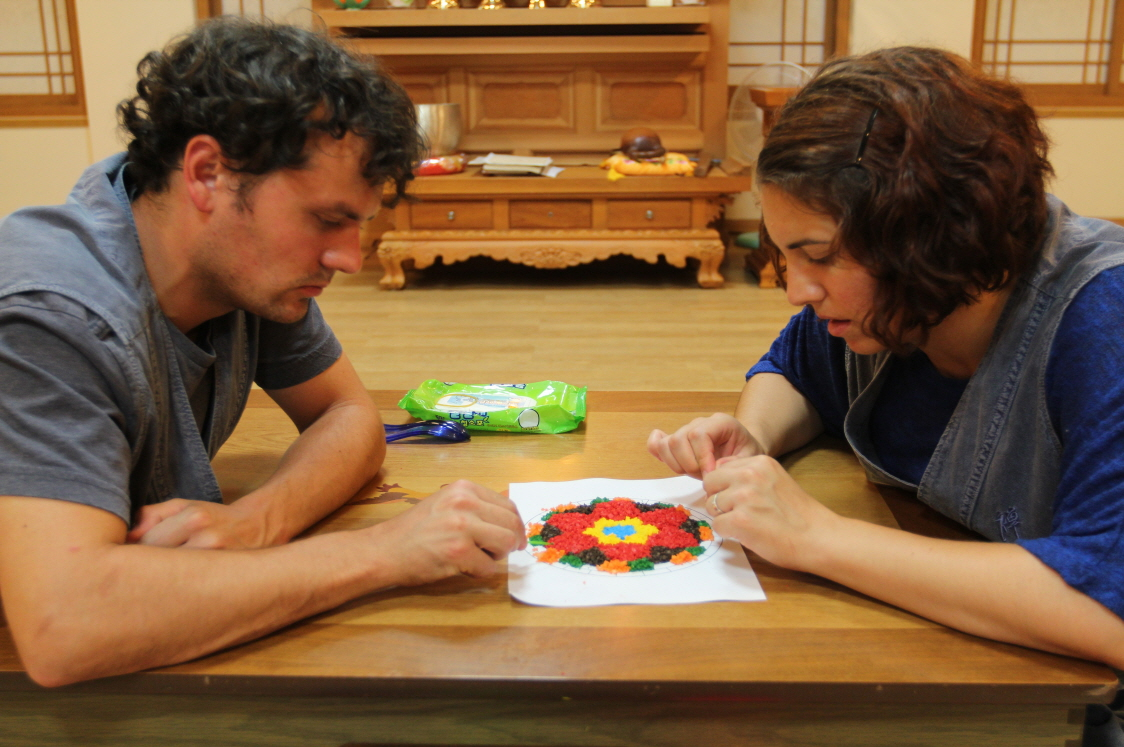
