= Balsan station =

Station of the Seoul Metropolitan Subway

발산 (SNU서울병원); Balsan (SNU Seoul Hospital)
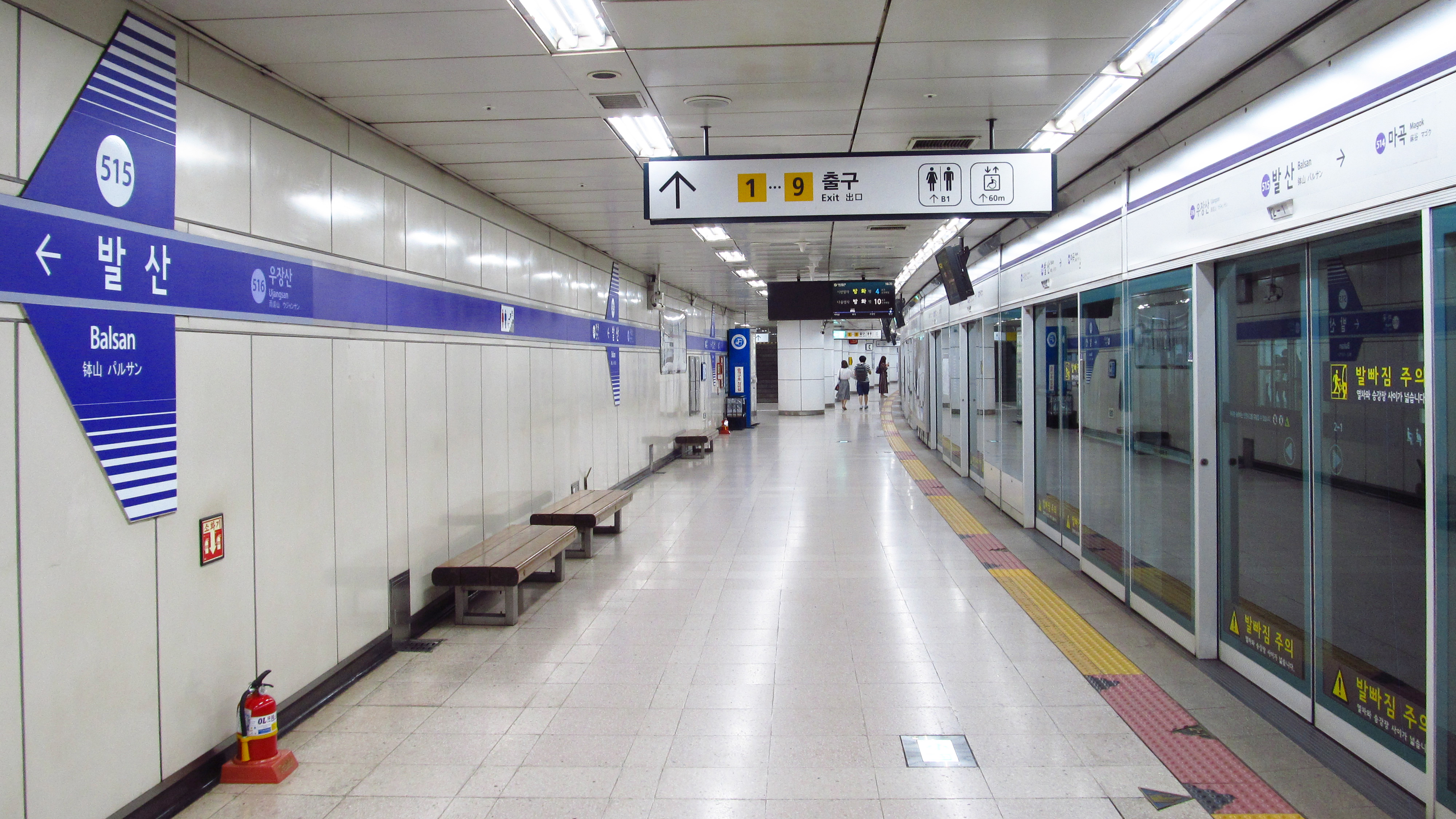
- Station platform in September 2018

Korean name
- Hangul: 발산역
- Hanja: 鉢山驛
- Revised Romanization: Balsannyeok
- McCune–Reischauer: Palsannyŏk

General information
- Location: 967-3 Gayang-dong, 267 Gonghangdae-ro Jiha; Gangseo-gu, Seoul
- Coordinates: 37°33′31″N 126°50′14″E
- Operator: Seoul Metro
- Line: Line 5
- Platforms: 2
- Tracks: 2

Construction
- Structure type: Underground

History
- Opened: March 20, 1996

Services
Preceding station	Seoul Metropolitan Subway	Following station
Magok towards Banghwa	Line 5	Ujangsan towards Hanam Geomdansan or Macheon
Location

Balsan Station is a station on the Seoul Subway Line 5 in Gangseo-gu, Seoul.

Balsan station lies just east of Gimpo International Airport. The Han River is a 15-minute walk to the north. Businesses around the station include NC Department stores, and Lotteria. Also within walking distance to the east are Home Plus, E-Mart, and McDonald's.

== Station layout ==
G	Street level	Exit

L1; Concourse	Lobby	Customer Service, Shops, Vending machines, ATMs

L2; Platforms	Side platform, doors will open on the right
L2; Platforms	Westbound	← Line 5 toward Banghwa (Magok)
L2; Platforms	Eastbound	Line 5 toward Hanam Geomdansan or Macheon (Ujangsan)→
L2; Platforms	Side platform, doors will open on the right

== Vicinity ==
- Exit 1: Magok-dong
- Exit 2: Balsan Sageori(Junction)
- Exit 3: NC Department Stores, Deungmyeong Elementary & Middle Schools
- Exit 4: Gangseo Employment Office
- Exit 5: Gangseo-gu Office
- Exit 6: Ujangsan Hillstate APT
- Exit 7: Gagok Elementary School
- Exit 8: Balsan 1-dong, Ewha Womans University Medical Center
- Exit 9: Gangseo driver's examination office
