= Songjeong station =

Station of the Seoul Metropolitan Subway

송정; Songjeong
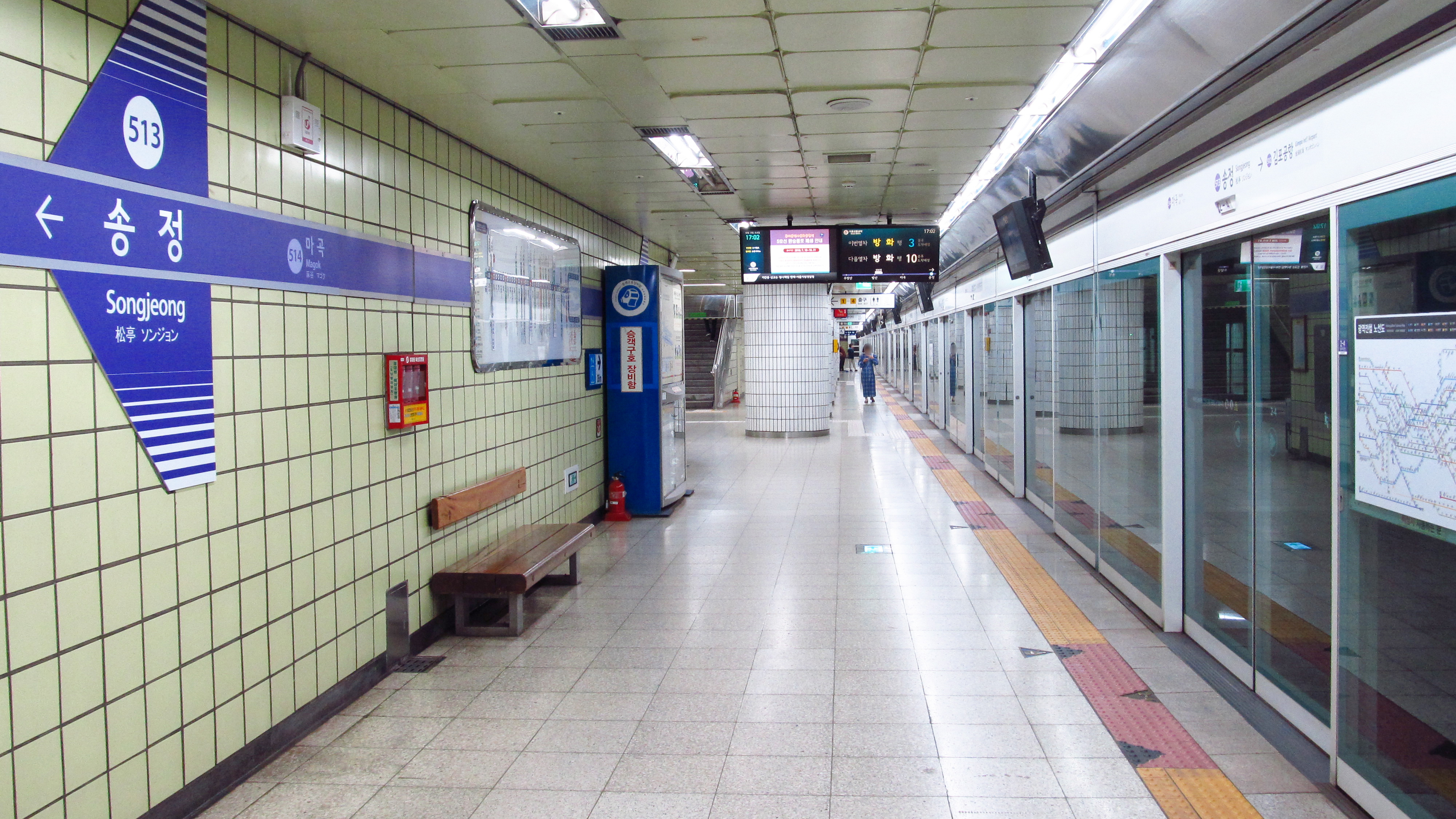
- Station platform in September 2018

Korean name
- Hangul: 송정역
- Hanja: 松亭驛
- Revised Romanization: Songjeongnyeok
- McCune–Reischauer: Songjŏngnyŏk

General information
- Location: 29-5 Gonghang-dong, 33 Gonghangdae-ro Jiha; Gangseo-gu, Seoul
- Coordinates: 37°33′40″N 126°48′43″E
- Operator: Seoul Metro
- Line: Line 5
- Platforms: 2
- Tracks: 2

Construction
- Structure type: Underground

History
- Opened: March 20, 1996

Services
Preceding station	Seoul Metropolitan Subway	Following station
Gimpo International Airport towards Banghwa	Line 5	Magok towards Hanam Geomdansan or Macheon
Location

Songjeong Station is a station on Seoul Subway Line 5 in Gangseo-gu, Seoul.

== Station layout ==
G	Street level	Exit

L1; Concourse	Lobby	Customer Service, Shops, Vending machines, ATMs

L2; Platforms	Side platform, doors will open on the right
L2; Platforms	Westbound	← Line 5 toward Banghwa (Gimpo Int'l Airport)
L2; Platforms	Eastbound	Line 5 toward Hanam Geomdansan or Macheon (Magok)→
L2; Platforms	Side platform, doors will open on the right

== Vicinity ==
- Exit 1 : Songjeong Elementary School
- Exit 2 : Gonghang Elementary & Middle Schools
- Exit 3 : Doksuri Gonghang APT
- Exit 4 : Gimpo Airport
