= Sindorim-dong =

- Interactive map of Sindorim-dong
- Country: South Korea

Area
  - Total: 1.49 km^{2} (0.58 sq mi)

Population (2001)
  - Total: 23,985
  - Density: 16,100/km^{2} (41,700/sq mi)

Korean name
- Hangul: 신도림동
- Hanja: 新道林洞
- RR: Sindorim-dong
- MR: Sindorim-dong

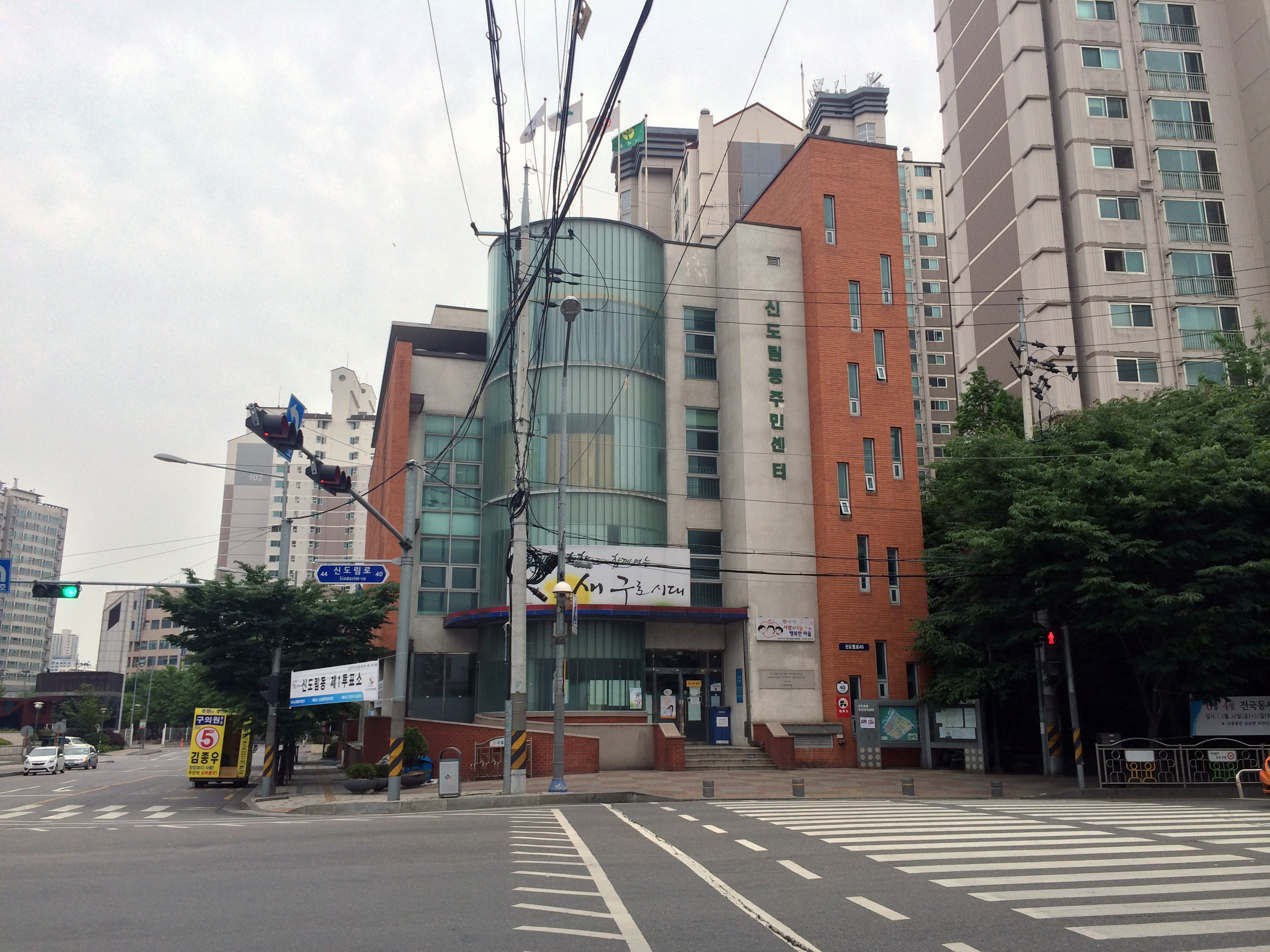

Sindorim-dong (Korean: 신도림동) is a dong (neighbourhood) of Guro District, Seoul, South Korea.

Sindorim-dong is the main transportation point where the Gyeongin-ro and western highway are interlocked with Sindorim Station, the transfer station for Seoul subway lines No. 1 and 2. Recently, the move into high-rise multipurpose building, office-residential building, and apartment complexes has rapidly emerged as a new type of construction site and commercial district in southwestern Seoul.

== Education ==
- Seoul Sindorim Elementary School
- Seoul Sinmirim Elementary School
- Sindorim Middle school
- Sindorim High School

== Traffic ==
- Seoul Subway Line 1. Sindorim Station
- Seoul Subway Line 2. Sindorim Station
- Seoul Subway Line 1. Guro Station
- Gyeonginno
- Seobu Ganseondoro

== See also ==
- Administrative divisions of South Korea
