= Sindorim station =

Train station in South Korea

Coordinates: 37°30′33″N 126°53′28″E

신도림; Sindorim
신도림; Sindorim
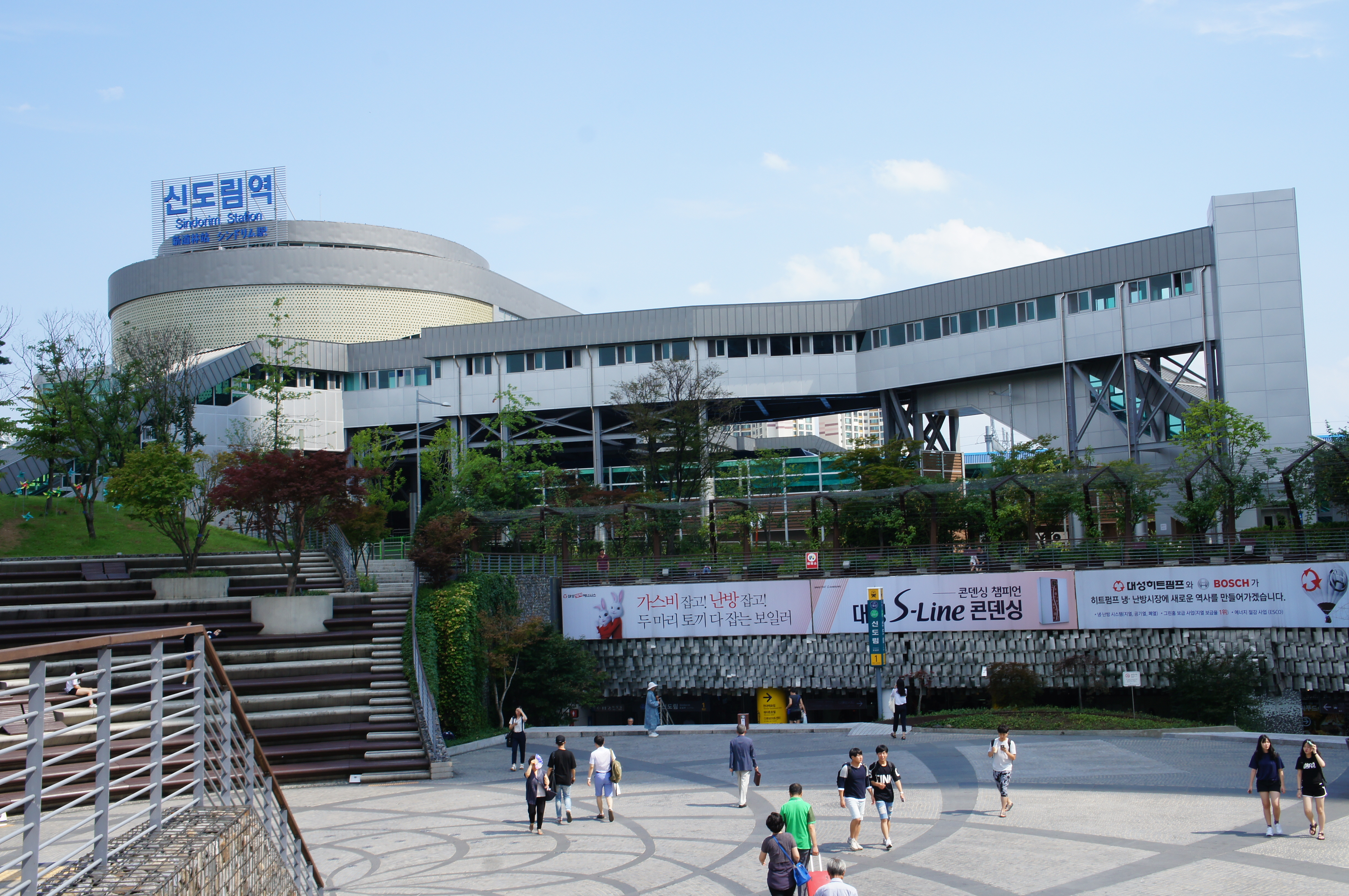
- Exit 1

Korean name
- Hangul: 신도림역
- Hanja: 新道林驛
- RR: Sindorim-yeok
- MR: Sindorim-yŏk

General information
- Location: 460-26 Sindorim-dong, Guro-gu; Seoul; South Korea
- Operator: Korail, Seoul Metro
- Lines: Gyeongbu Line; Line 2
- Platforms: 6
- Tracks: 8

History
- Opened: May 22, 1984

Passengers
- 2018: 119,414

Services
Preceding station	Seoul Metropolitan Subway	Following station
Yeongdeungpo towards Kwangwoon University or Yeoncheon	Line 1	Guro towards Incheon, Seodongtan or Sinchang
Yeongdeungpo towards Dongducheon	Line 1 Gyeongwon Express	Guro towards Incheon
Noryangjin towards Yongsan	Line 1 Gyeongin Express	Guro towards Dongincheon
Yeongdeungpo towards Cheongnyangni	Line 1 Gyeongbu Express	Guro towards Sinchang
Yeongdeungpo Terminus	Line 1 Gwangmyeong Shuttle Service	Guro towards Gwangmyeong
Daerim Next counterclockwise	Line 2	Mullae Next clockwise
Terminus	Line 2 Sinjeong Branch	Dorimcheon towards Kkachisan
Track layout
Location

Sindorim station is a station on Seoul Subway Line 1 (overground platforms) and Line 2 (underground). It is also the southeastern terminus of Line 2's Sinjeong Branch to Kkachisan (underground platform 3). The station is located at the northern edge of Sindorim-dong, Guro-gu, Seoul, on the border with Yeongdeungpo-gu.

Sindorim station is designed primarily to serve as a transfer station of the Subway Lines 1 and 2, having no direct exits from the Line 1 platform. It is known to be the most congested transfer station of Seoul Subway, especially during the rush hours. It is estimated that over 320,000 passengers per day use Sindorim Station to transfer between Lines 1 and 2. A plan to extend the Line 2 part of the station, including a new platform for the outer circle line, is now on design. Screen doors have been added to the subway platforms.

D-Cube City, a large leisure complex consisting of a Hyundai department store, additional coffee shops & restaurants on the periphery, a Sheraton Hotel and a Lotte Cinema, is located next to the station. The complex was opened in 2011 and is directly connected to the station by an underground passageway which passes under the entire width of the station.

All Line 2 trains that operate up to this station take the Sinjeong branch to be serviced at the Sinjeong train servicing depot, located next to Yangcheon-gu Office station.

In 2013, improvements were made in terms of accessibility for Line 1. A new overhead concourse was constructed above the Line platforms to ease congestion in the underground concourse, where passengers transfer between Lines 1 and 2. The new overhead concourse includes childcare facilities and meeting rooms.

South Korean music group Jaurim wrote in the song "The Departure," "Strip Show in Sindorim Station..."I wrote the lyrics, ".

== Future GTX Services ==
Construction of the new high speed commuter rail service, GTX, commenced in 2017. Three separate lines - A, B & C are under construction or in the planning stage. GTX B will, once completed, connect Songdo, Incheon, in the Southwest and Maseok in Namyangju, in the Northeast. Sindorim will be one of the GTX B stations located within Seoul, along with Yeouido, Yongsan and Seoul Station. Construction of GTX B will commence in 2022.

== Gallery ==
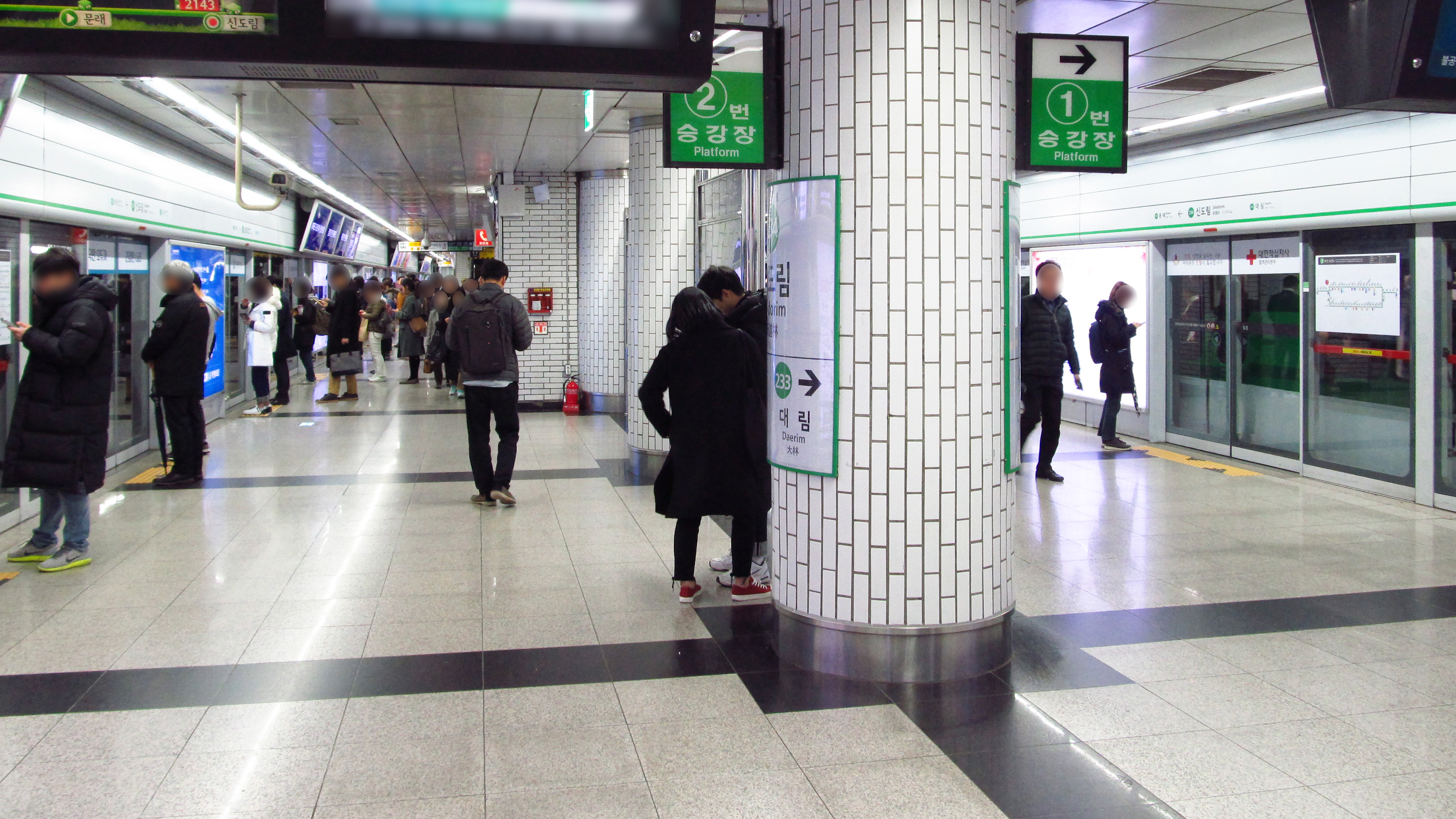
Line 2 platforms

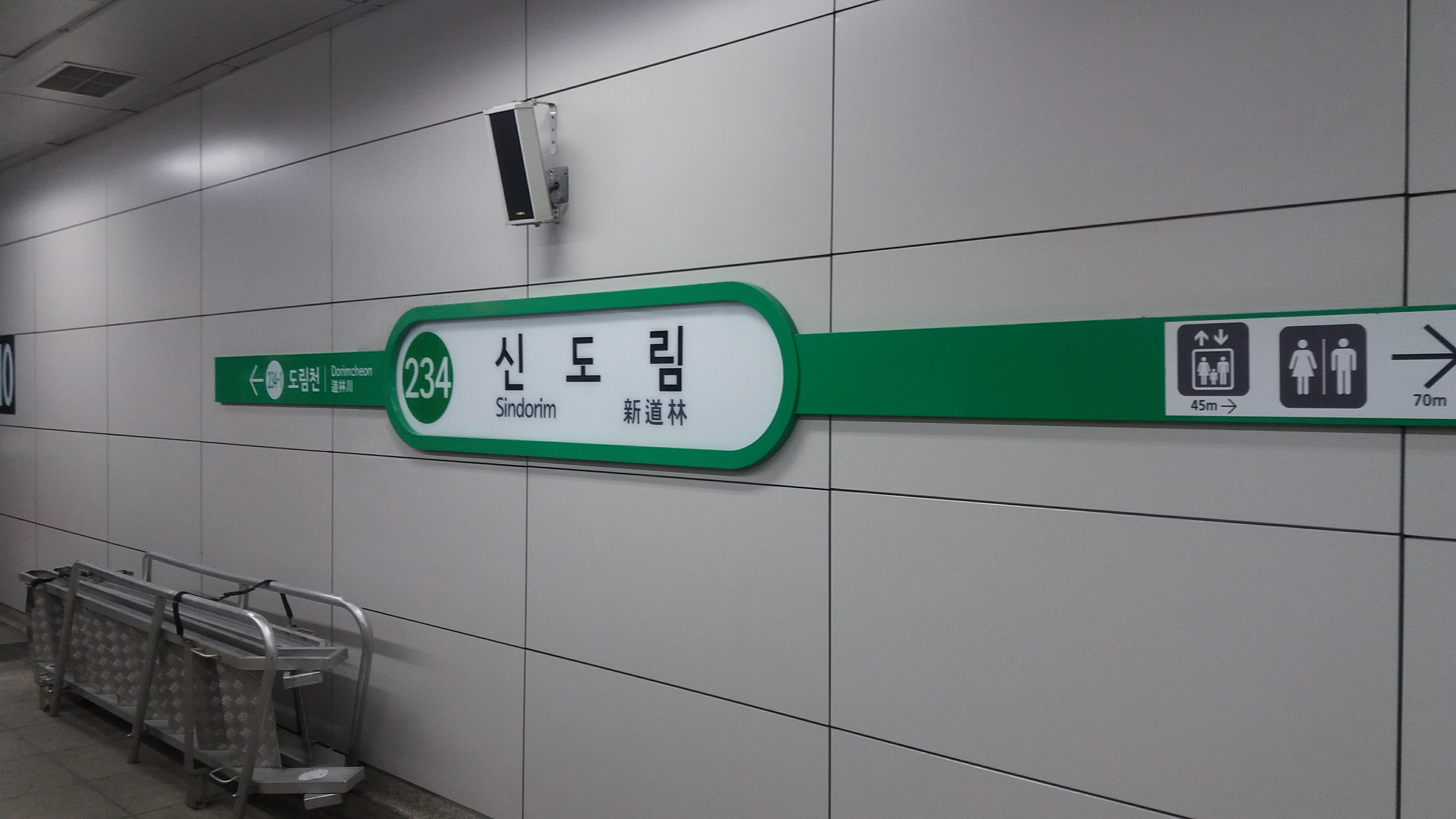
Platform wall signage on Line 2 (Sinjeong branch)

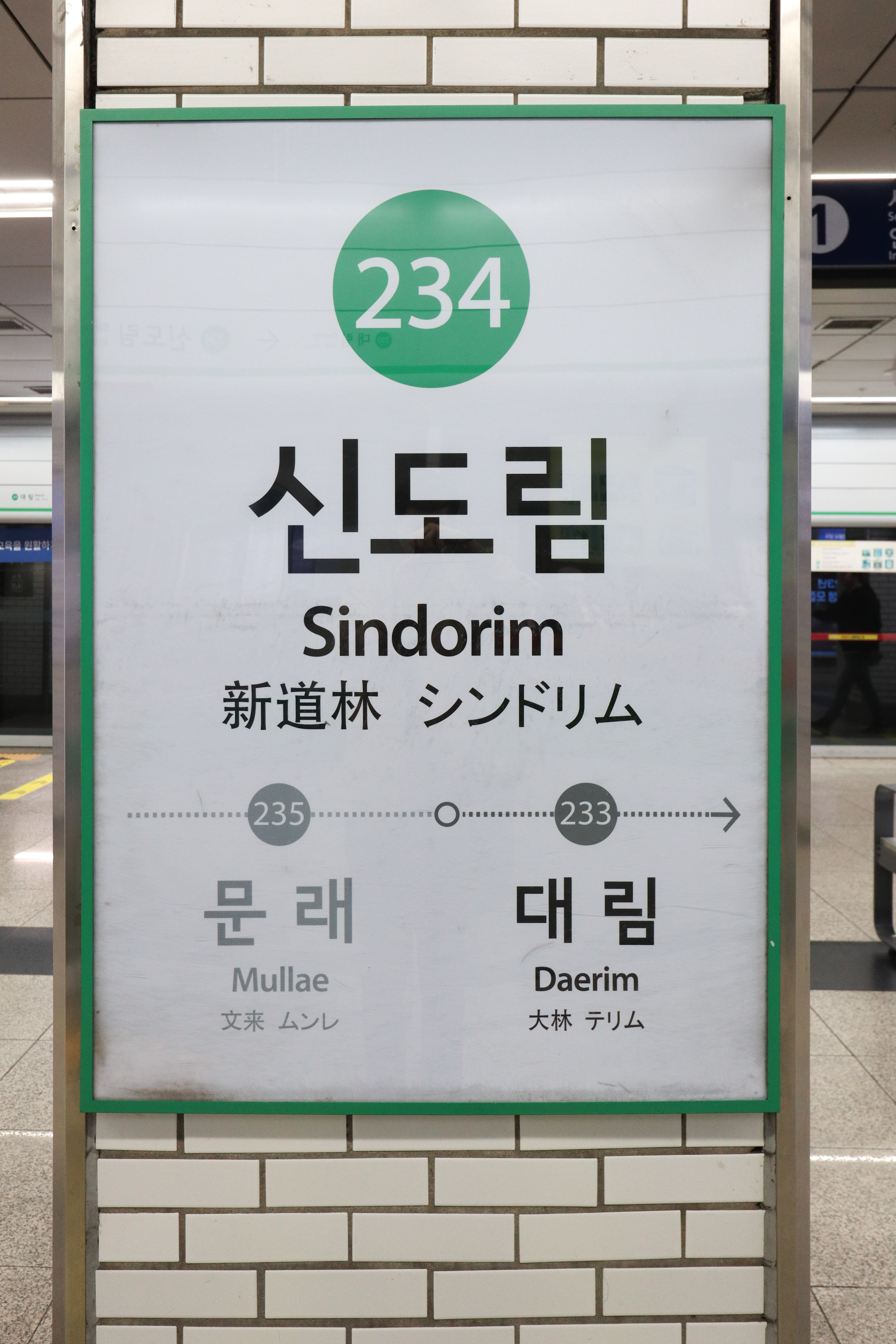
Line 2 station signage (Main Line)

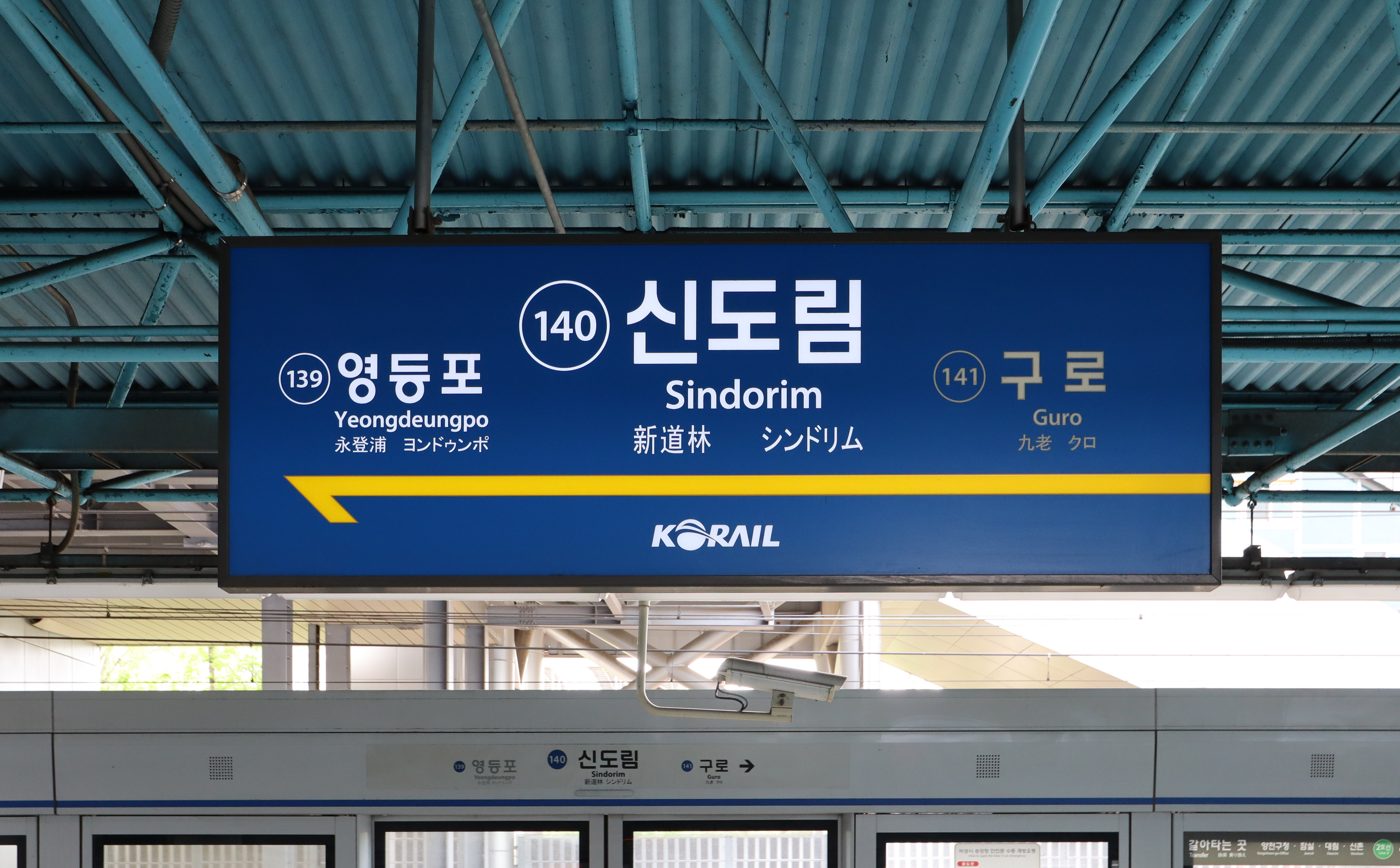
Platform overhead signage on Line 1

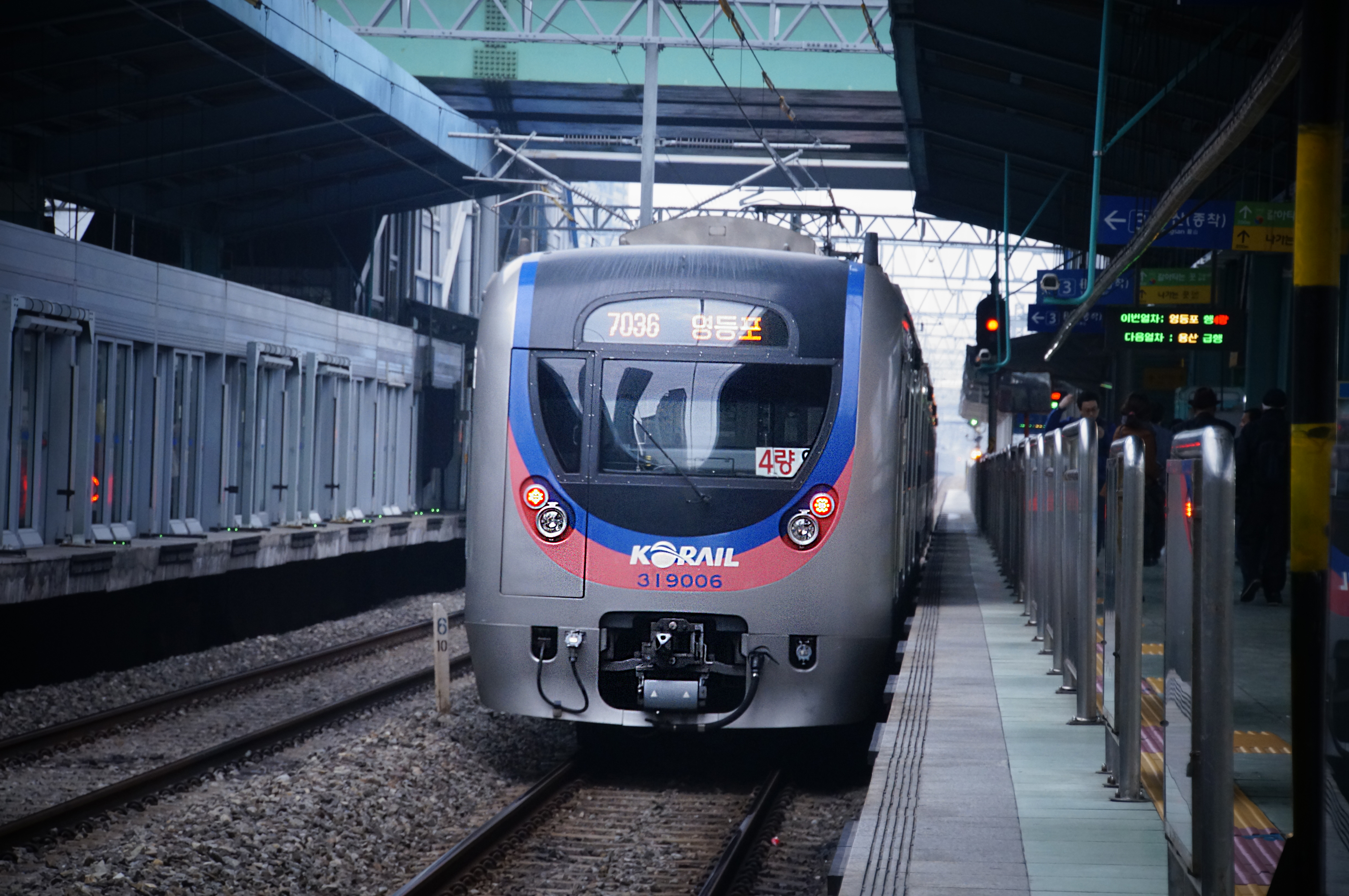
Line 1 service at Sindorim Station
