= Yangcheon District =

District of Seoul, South Korea

Yangcheon
- Autonomous District
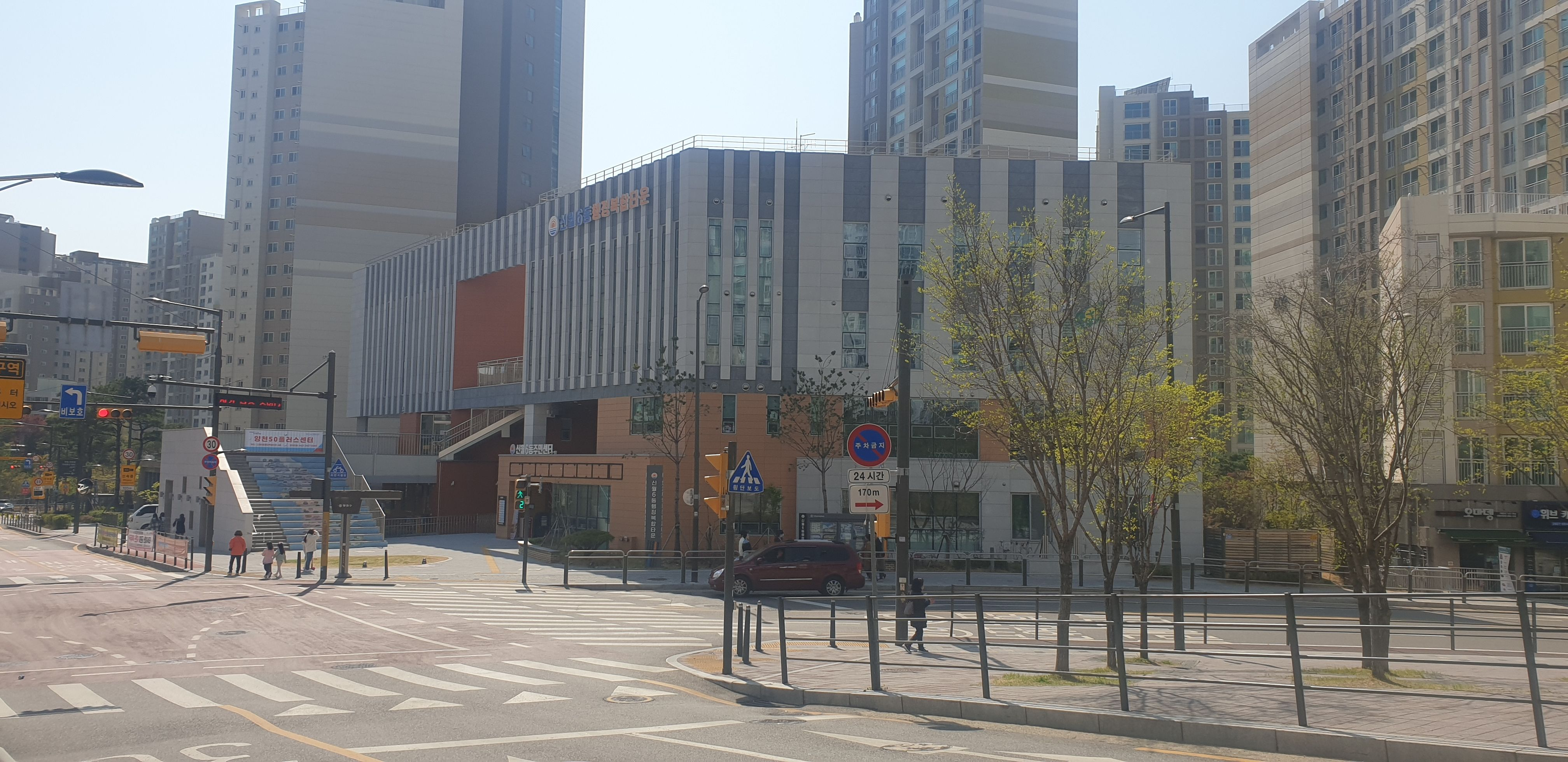
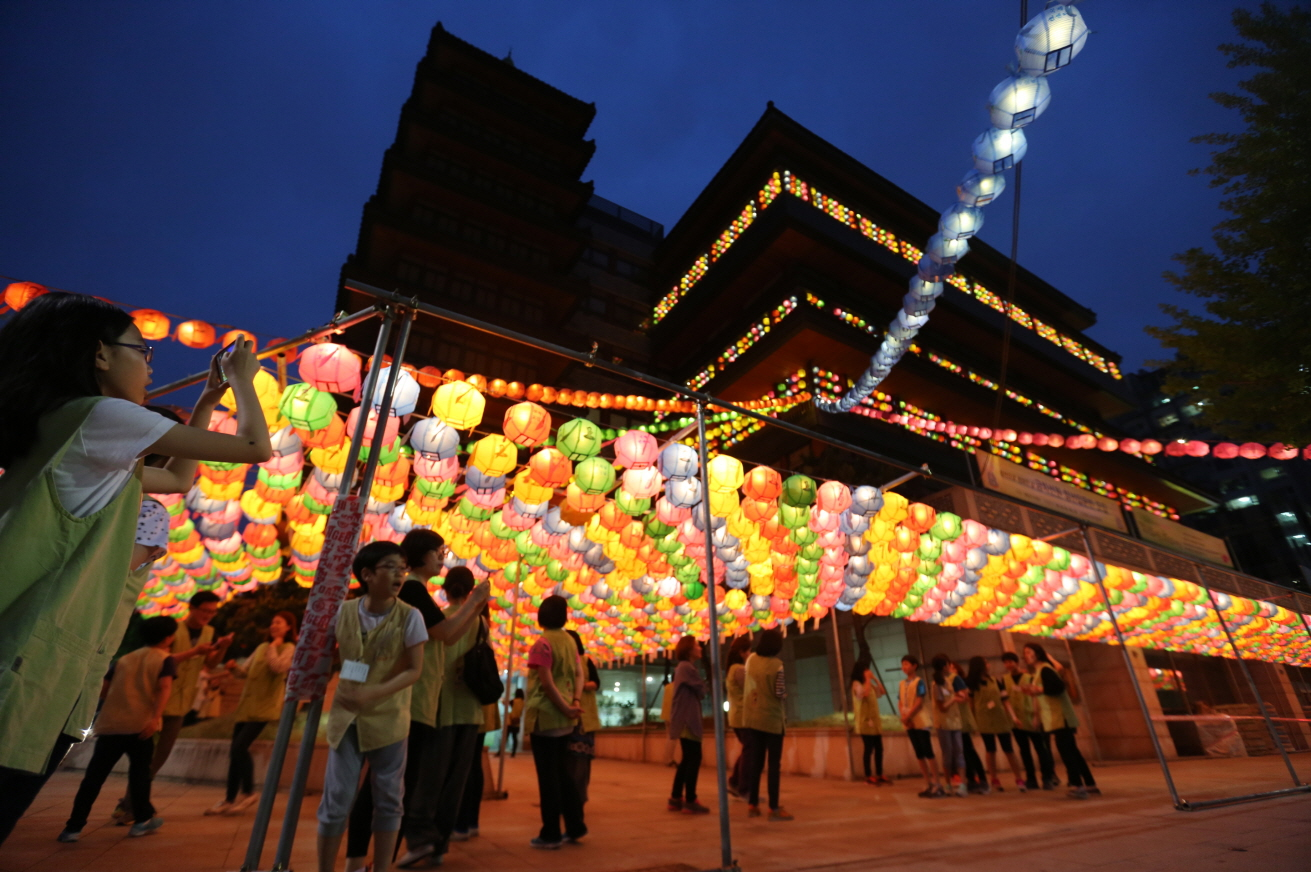
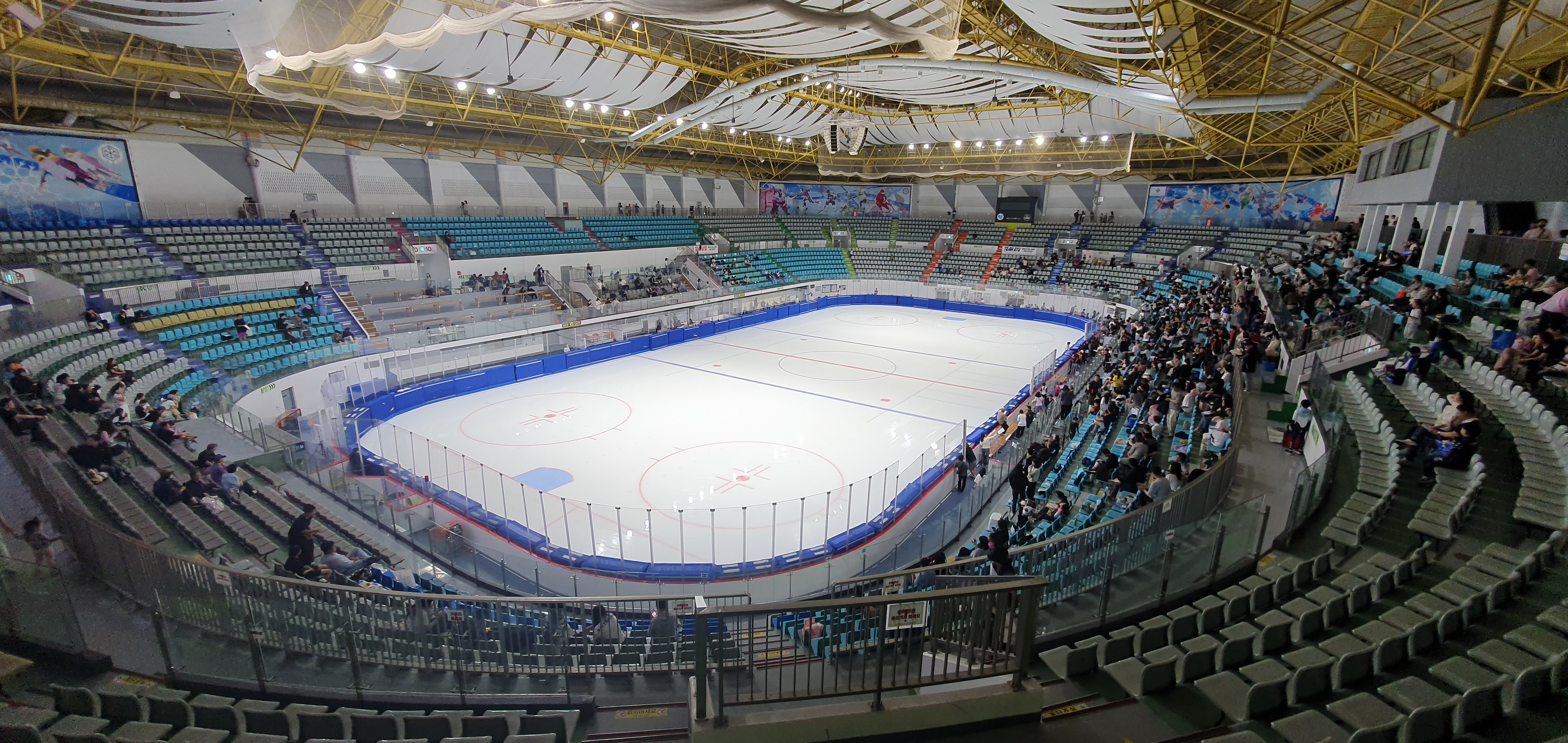
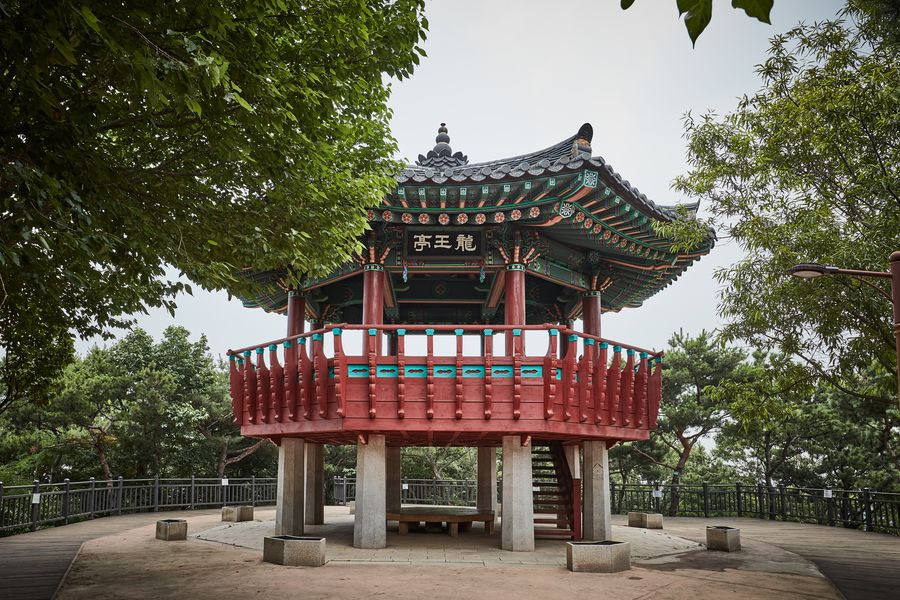
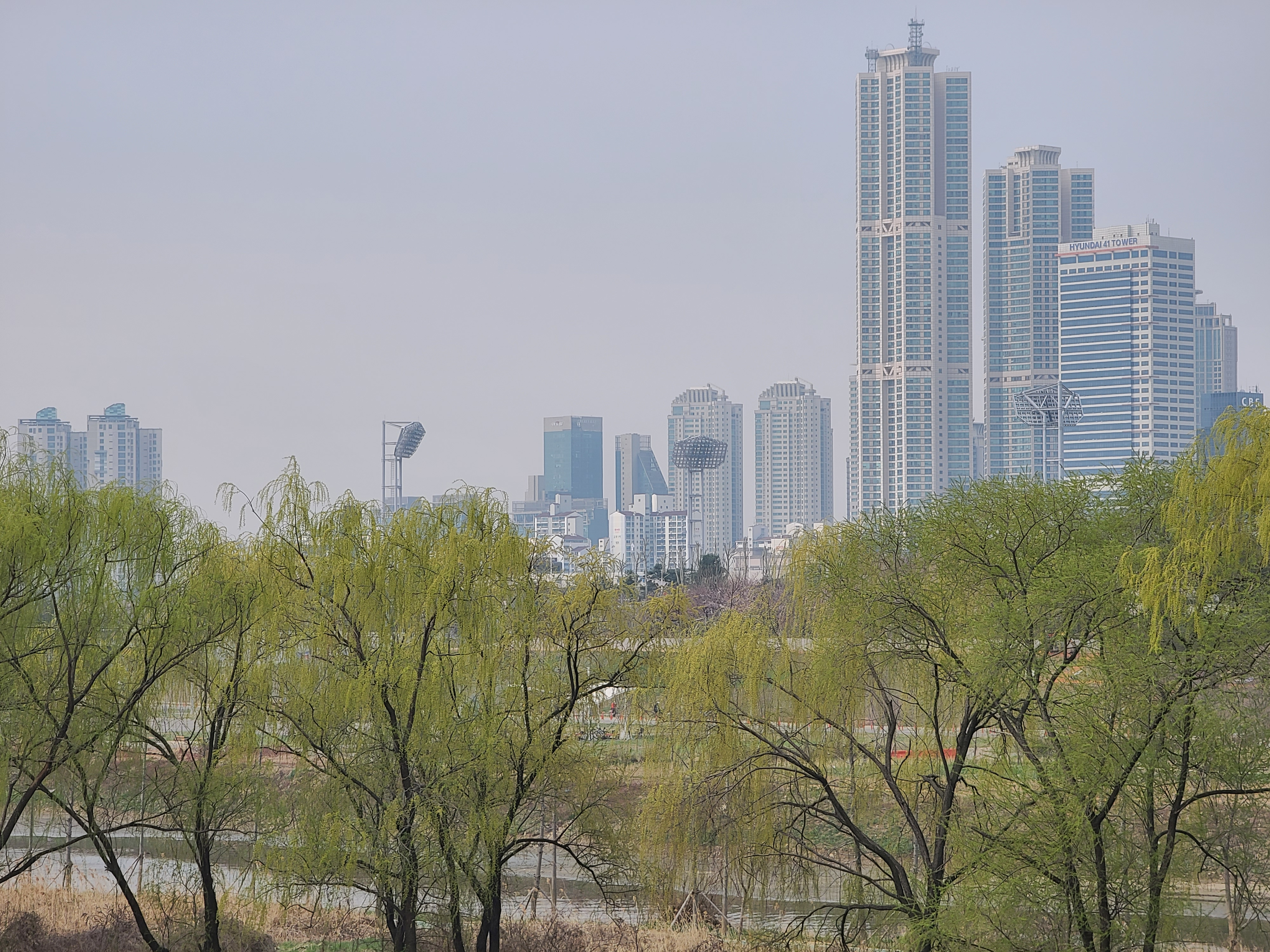
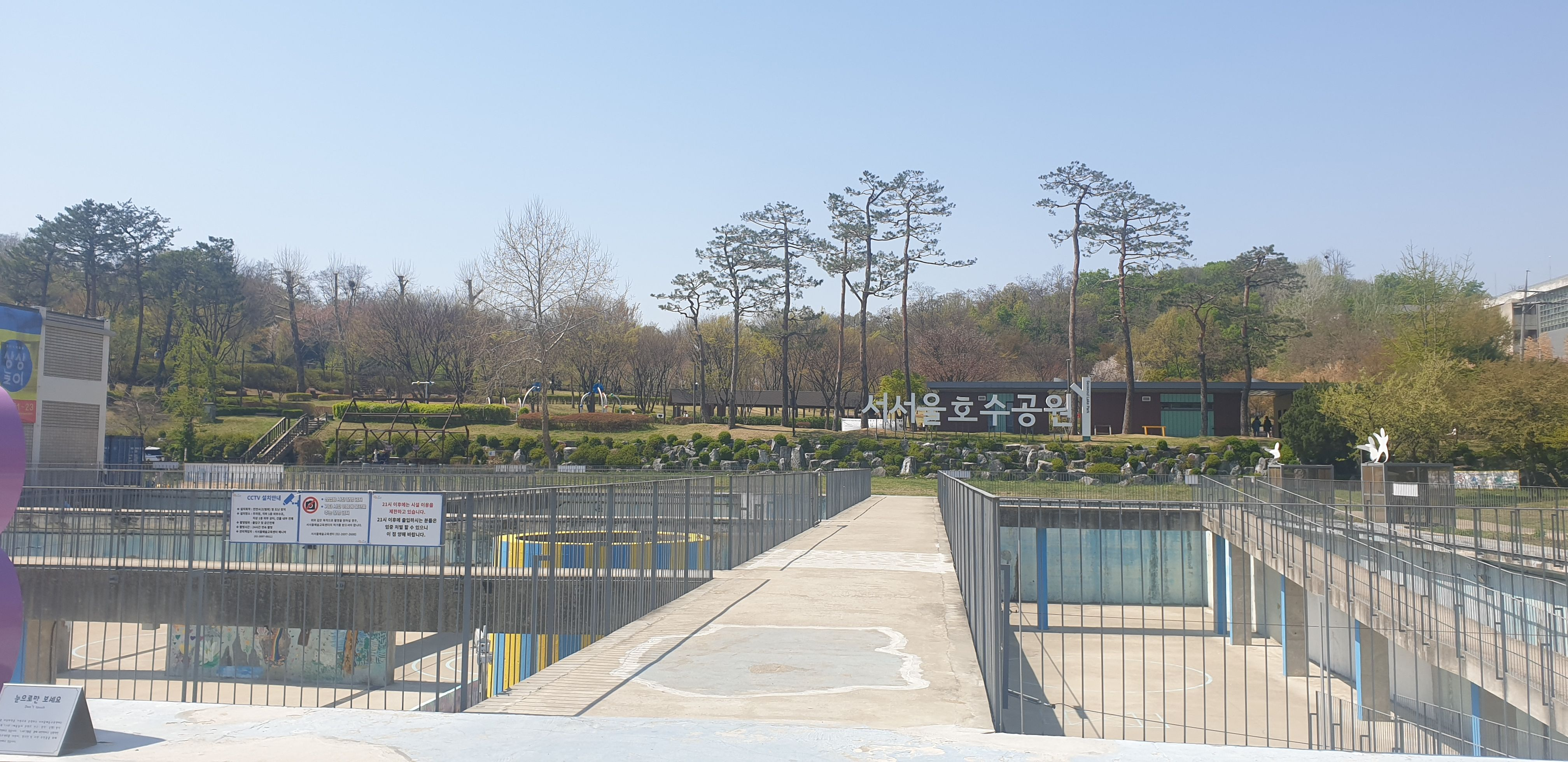
- Sinwol 6 Dong Community Center International Seon Center Mokdong Stadium Yongwangsan Hyperion Towers West Seoul Lake Park

- Flag

- Location of Yangcheon District in Seoul
- Coordinates: 37°31′0.74″N 126°51′59.03″E
- Country: South Korea
- Region: Sudogwon
- Special City: Seoul
- Administrative dong: 21

Government
  - Body: Yangcheon-gu Council
  - Mayor: Lee Ki-jae (People Power)
  - MNAs: List of MNAs: Hwang Hee (Democratic); Lee Yong-seon (Democratic)

Area
  - Total: 17.40 km^{2} (6.72 sq mi)

Population (2010)
  - Total: 469,434
  - Density: 26,980/km^{2} (69,880/sq mi)
- Time zone: UTC+9 (Korea Standard Time)
- Postal code.: 07900 – 08199
- Area code(s): +82-2-2600~
- Website: official website

Korean name
- Hangul: 양천구
- Hanja: 陽川區
- RR: Yangcheon-gu
- MR: Yangch'ŏn-gu

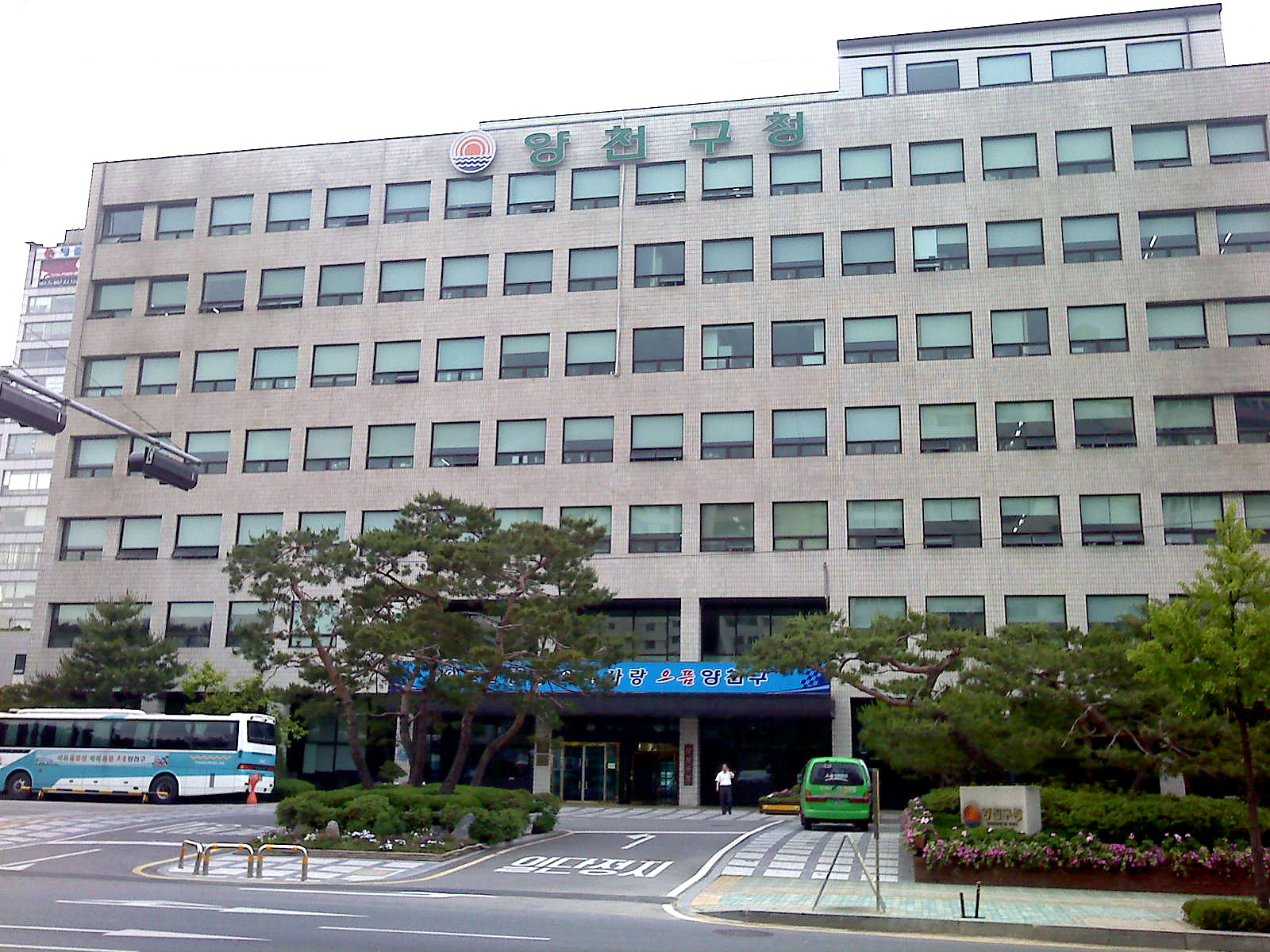
Yangcheon district office

Yangcheon District (Korean: 양천구) is one of the 25 districts of Seoul, South Korea, located on the southwest side of the Han River. At the centre of this district is the Mok-dong area, which is home to numerous shopping outlets, bars and restaurants, an ice rink, schools, and large residential buildings inhabited by mostly upper-middle and upper-class families.

Kim Soo-young of the Democratic Party was the district's first female mayor, which she served from July 2014 to June 2022.

== History ==
It was known as 'Jechapaui-hyun' (제차파의현; 齊次巴衣縣) during the Goguryeo age, and has gone through several name-changes since. It was renamed 'Yangcheon' in 1310, during the Goryeo dynasty. It was separated from the neighboring Gangseo district in 1988. The Yangcheon District includes Mok-dong, Sinjeong-dong and Sinwol-dong. This area was developed during the 1980s, as a result of government policy to build a new residential area in Seoul; large apartment complexes were built. Now, the Yangcheon District is home to mostly middle and upper-class families and is considered one of the better wards in Seoul to live. Yangcheon is located to the east of Gimpo International Airport and just south of the river from the popular Hongdae area of Seoul.

== Sights ==
Mokdong Stadium at this distinct opened for the Olympic Games in 1988. Among all stadiums, the baseball stadium was used to hold many games for juniors. Since 2008, the stadium has been used for co-hosting amateur baseball games and professional games for settlement of Nexen Heroes, a re-founded team this year which had been made of former Hyundai Unicorns players.

In Mok-dong, the Hyperion Towers, a group of three buildings completed in 2003, dominate the skyline. Tower A is 69 stories and 256 metres (840 feet) high, making it the fifth-tallest building in Seoul and one of the tallest purely residential buildings in the world. At the bottom of these towers sits a large Hyundai department store.

The headquarters for CBS and SBS is located in Mok-dong.

== Events ==
Inspired by the shape of the district that resembles a puppy, the district has been hosting the "Happy yangcheon companion dog culture festival" since 2015.

== Administrative divisions ==
Administrative divisions

- Mok-dong (목동; 木洞) 1, 2, 3, 4, 5
- Sinjeong-dong (신정동; 新亭洞) 1, 2, 3, 4, 5, 6, 7
- Sinwol-dong (신월동; 新月洞) 1, 2, 3, 4, 5, 6, 7

== Sister cities ==
- Chaoyang District, Changchun, China (since 1995)
- (South Korea) South Chungcheong Province, Buyeo County (Since 1997)
- City of Bankstown (currently City of Canterbury Bankstown), New South Wales, Australia (since 2002)
- (South Korea) North Gyeongsang Province, Uljin County (Since 2003)
- (South Korea) South Jeolla Province, Suncheon (since 2003)
- (South Korea) South Jeolla Province, Hwasun County (since 2005)
- (South Korea) City of Incheon, Ganghwa County (Since 2008)
- (Japan) Nagano Prefecture, Nagano (since 2010)
- (South Korea) Wando County (Since 2020)
- (South Korea) Hongcheon County (since 2020)
- Grecia, Costa Rica (Since June 24, 2021)
- (France) 17th arrondissement of Paris (since 2022)

== See also ==
- Administrative divisions of South Korea
