= Kkachisan station =

Train station in Seoul, South Korea

까치산; Kkachisan
까치산; Kkachisan
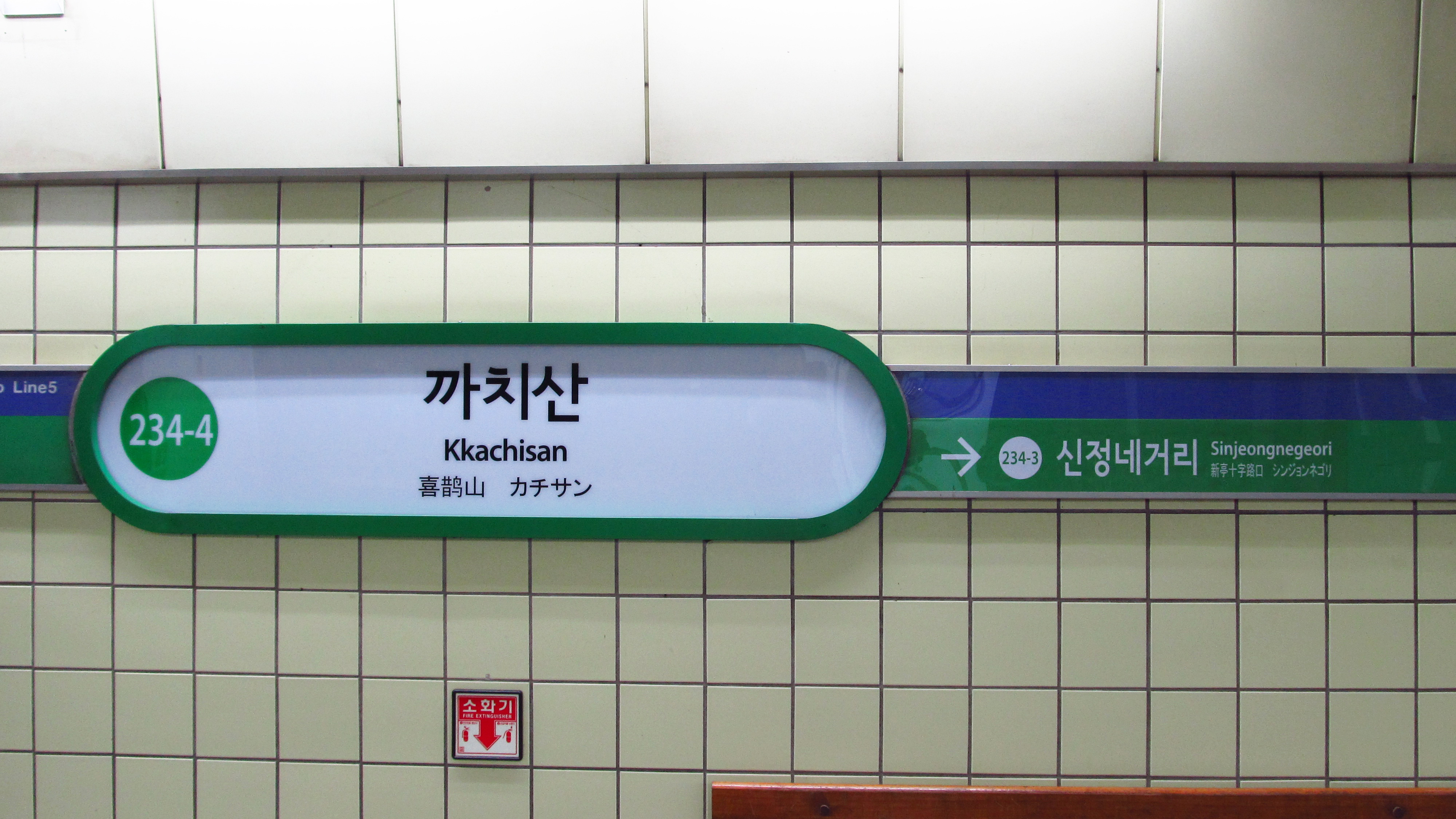
- Line 2 station sign

Korean name
- Hangul: 까치산역
- Hanja: 까치山驛
- Revised Romanization: Kkachisan-yeok
- McCune–Reischauer: Kkach'isan-yŏk

General information
- Location: 343 Hwagok 1-dong, Gangseo-gu, Seoul
- Coordinates: 37°31′54″N 126°50′48″E
- Operator: Seoul Metro
- Lines: Line 2 Line 5
- Platforms: 4
- Tracks: 6

Construction
- Structure type: Underground

History
- Opened: March 20, 1996

Services
Preceding station	Seoul Metropolitan Subway	Following station
Sinjeongnegeori towards Sindorim	Line 2 Sinjeong Branch	Terminus
Hwagok towards Banghwa	Line 5	Sinjeong towards Hanam Geomdansan or Macheon
Location

Kkachisan station is a station on Seoul Subway Line 5, as well as the northwestern terminus of the Sinjeong Branch of Line 2. Seoul Metro operates both Line 2 and 5 platforms.

This station is located in Hwagok-dong, Gangseo-gu, Seoul.

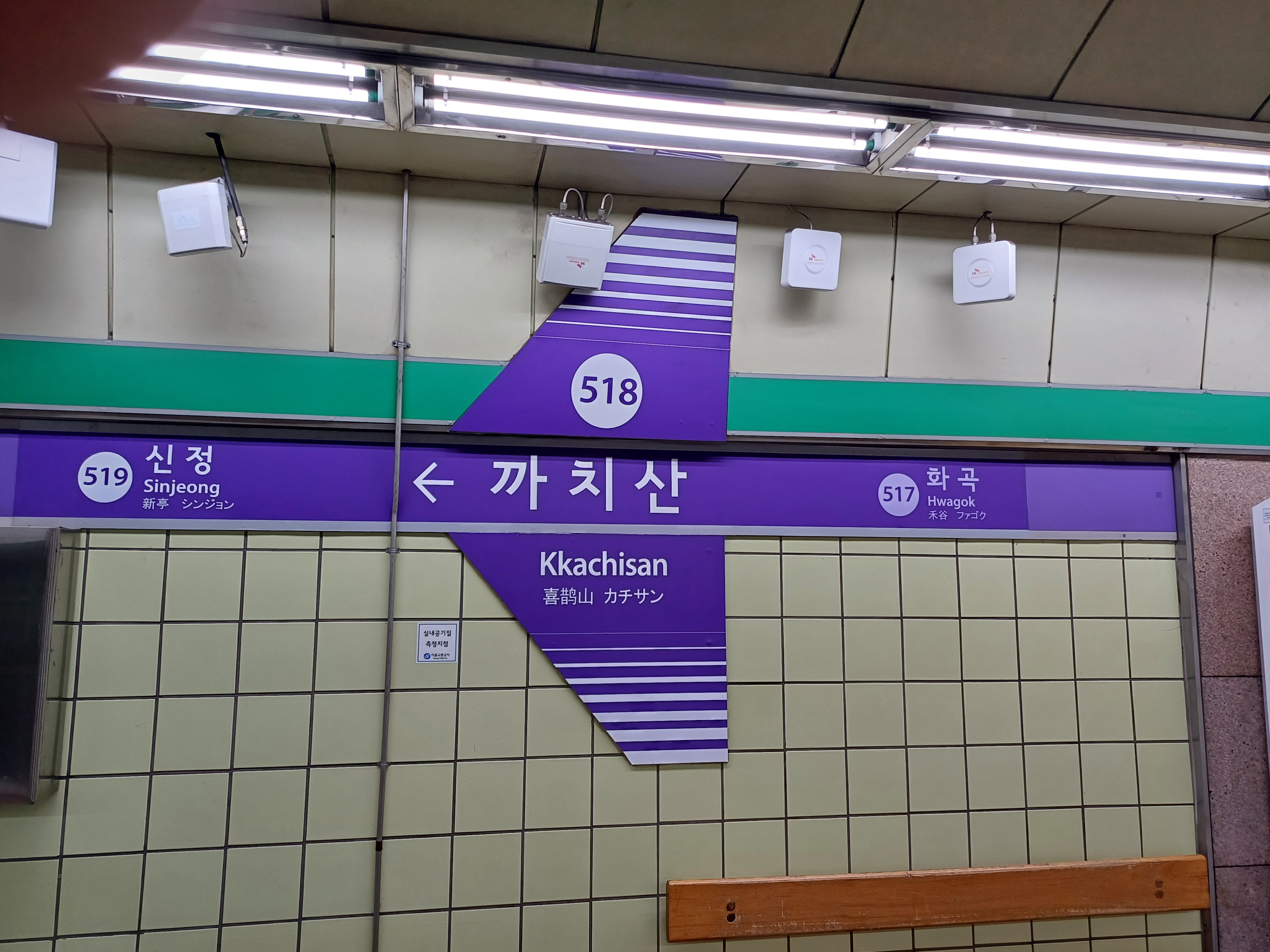
Line 5 station sign

== Exits ==
1. Exit 1: Hwagok 1-dong Police Station, Hwagok 8-dong Community Center
2. Exit 2: Sinjeong Elementary School, Hwagok 2-dong Police Station, Hwagok 2-dong Community Center
3. Exit 3: Hwagok 1-dong Community Center
4. Exit 4: Jung-ang Heights Apartment, Hwagok 7-dong Community Center
