= 馬場 =

馬場, meaning "horse field", "hippodrome", or "racecourse", may refer to:

In the Mandarin reading Mǎchǎng:

- Machangding, former administrative district in Wanhua District, Taipei, Taiwan

In the Cantonese reading Máhcheùhng:

- Racecourse station (MTR), Shatin, New Territories, Hong Kong
- Sha Tin Racecourse, New Territories, Hong Kong
- Happy Valley Racecourse, Hong Kong Island, Hong Kong

In the Korean reading Majang:

- Majang-dong, Seungdong-gu, Seoul, South Korea
  - Majang station, Seoul Metro station located there

In the Japanese reading Baba:

- Takadanobaba, Shinjuku, Tokyo neighbourhood often simply referred to as "Baba"
  - Takadanobaba Station, railway and metro station located there
- Baba (name)

== See also ==
- Horse racing
- List of horse racing venues
