= Korean Arts High School =

Private high school in Seoul, South Korea

Korean Arts High School 한국예술고등학교

Location
- Muhak-ro 6gil 41, Hongik-dong, Seongdong District; Seoul; South Korea

Information
- Type: Private
- Established: 1987
- Principal: Gong Sung-min (공성민)
- Faculty: 63 (2013.2)
- Gender: Co-ed
- Enrollment: 720 (2013.2)
- Website: http://www.koreaartschool.co.kr/

Korean Arts High School (Korean: 한국예술고등학교) is a private arts high school located in Hongik-dong, Seongdong District, Seoul, South Korea.

The school was established in 1981, and provides education that includes general academic subjects, such as Korean language, English, mathematics, and social studies.

== Departments ==
- Department of Music (Classical Major, Practical Music Major)
- Department of Art
- Department of Theater and Film (Acting Major, Musical Major, Film Major, Directing Major)

== Notable alumni ==
- Choi San
- Choi Yeon-jun
- Choi Young-jae
- Hyun Seung-hee
- Hwang Chan-sung
- Jo Kwon
- Jung Min-joo
- Kang Ji-hyun (aka "Soyou")
- Kim Hyun-ah
- Kim Hyun-jung (aka "Seola")
- Kim Tae-hyung (aka "V")
- Min Sun-ye
- Park Ji-min
- Park Woo-jin
- Roh Tae-hyun
- Seo Soo-jin
- Seo Young-joo
- Yoon Bo-mi
