= Wangsimni station =

Station of the Seoul Metropolitan Subway

왕십리 (성동구청); Wangsimni (Seongdong-gu Office)
왕십리 (성동구청); Wangsimni (Seongdong-gu Office)
왕십리
Wangsimni
왕십리; Wangsimni
왕십리; Wangsimni
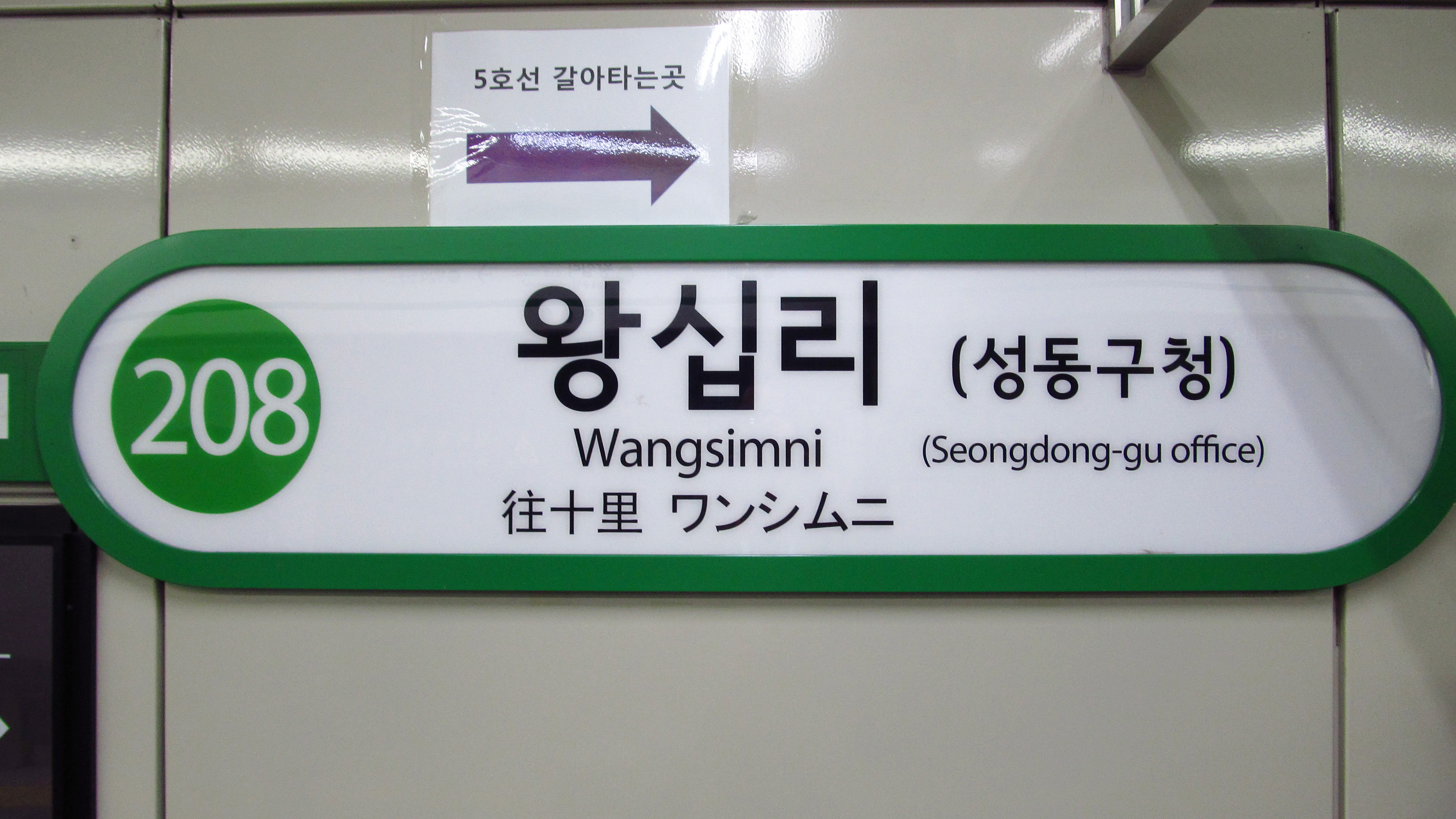
- Line 2 station nameplate

Korean name
- Hangul: 왕십리역
- Hanja: 往十里驛
- RR: Wangsimni-yeok
- MR: Wangsimni-yŏk

General information
- Location: 246 Haengdang 1-dong, Seongdong-gu, Seoul
- Coordinates: 37°33′40.3″N 127°2′15.8″E
- Operator: Seoul Metro; Korail
- Lines: Line 2 Line 5 Gyeongui–Jungang Line; Suin–Bundang Line
- Platforms: 6
- Tracks: 8

Key dates
- September 16, 1983: Line 2 opened
- November 15, 1995: Line 5 opened
- December 16, 2005: Gyeongui–Jungang Line opened
- October 6, 2012: Suin–Bundang Line opened

Passengers
- (Daily) Based on Jan-Dec of 2012. Line 2: 35,958; Line 5: 12,460; Gyeongui–Jungang Line: 21,298
Services
Preceding station	Seoul Metropolitan Subway	Following station
Sangwangsimni Next counterclockwise	Line 2	Hanyang University Next clockwise
Haengdang towards Banghwa	Line 5	Majang towards Hanam Geomdansan or Macheon
Eungbong towards Munsan	Gyeongui–Jungang Line	Cheongnyangni towards Jipyeong
Eungbong towards Munsan	Gyeongui–Jungang Line Gyeongui Express	Cheongnyangni towards Yongmun
Oksu towards Munsan	Gyeongui–Jungang Line Jungang Express	Cheongnyangni towards Yongmun
Cheongnyangni Terminus	Suin–Bundang Line	Seoul Forest towards Incheon
Preceding station	Korail	Following station
Oksu towards Yongsan	ITX-Cheongchun	Cheongnyangni towards Chuncheon
Location

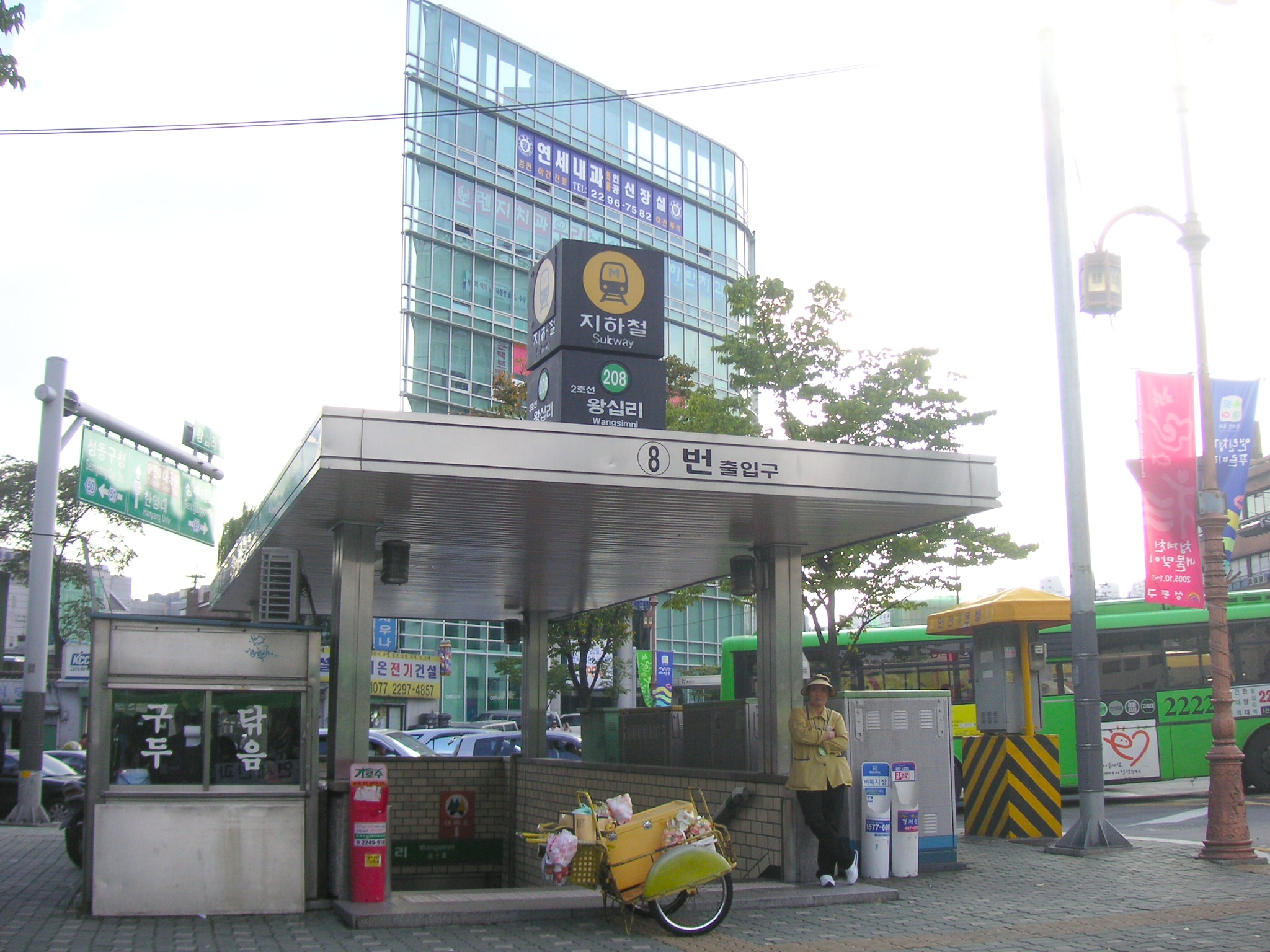
Exit 8 in 2005.

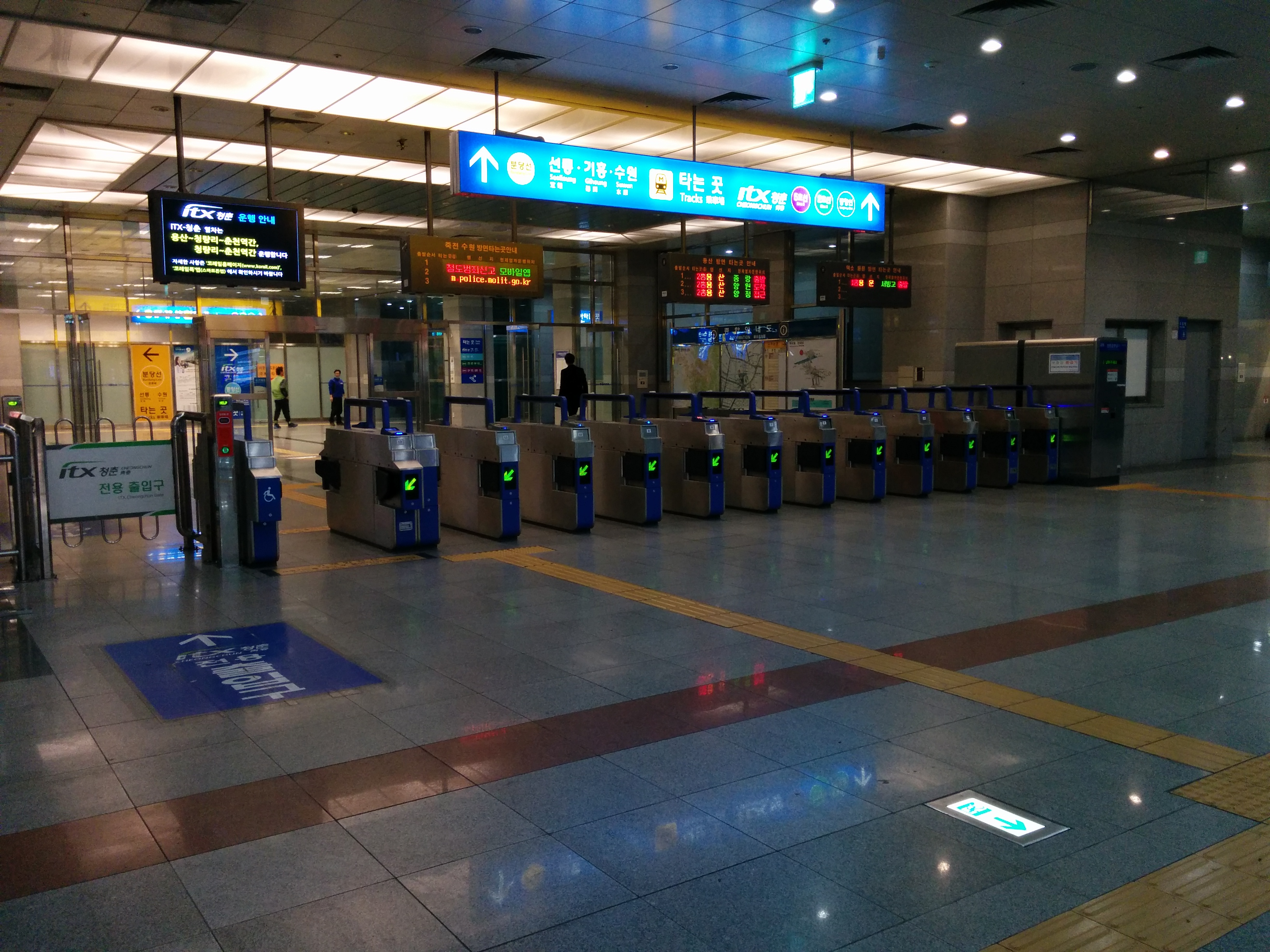
Exit 12 in 2014.

Wangsimni Station is a station on Seoul Subway Line 2, Seoul Subway Line 5, Gyeongui–Jungang Line, and Suin–Bundang Line; most Suin–Bundang Line trains end service here, though a few daily services continue along the tracks used by the Gyeonggi-Jungang line to terminate at the next station, Cheongnyangni in northeastern Seoul. It is located in Haengdang-dong, Seongdong-gu, Seoul.

The name of the station, "Wangsimni", is related to a historical account dating from 14th century Korea. After establishing and becoming the first king of the Joseon dynasty, Yi Seong-gye presented the great Buddhist monk Muhak with the task of finding a site for the new capital. After searching for a suitable place, the monk stopped and saw an old farmer passing by on his ox. The farmer pointed toward the northwest and said to him, wangsimni (往十里), literally meaning 'go ten more li (li = a unit measure equal to one-third of a mile).' The startled Muhak went to the northwest as he was told and ended up at the southern foot of Mt. Bugak, where Gyeongbokgung now stands. This was how Hanyang (present-day Seoul) was born.

== Gallery ==
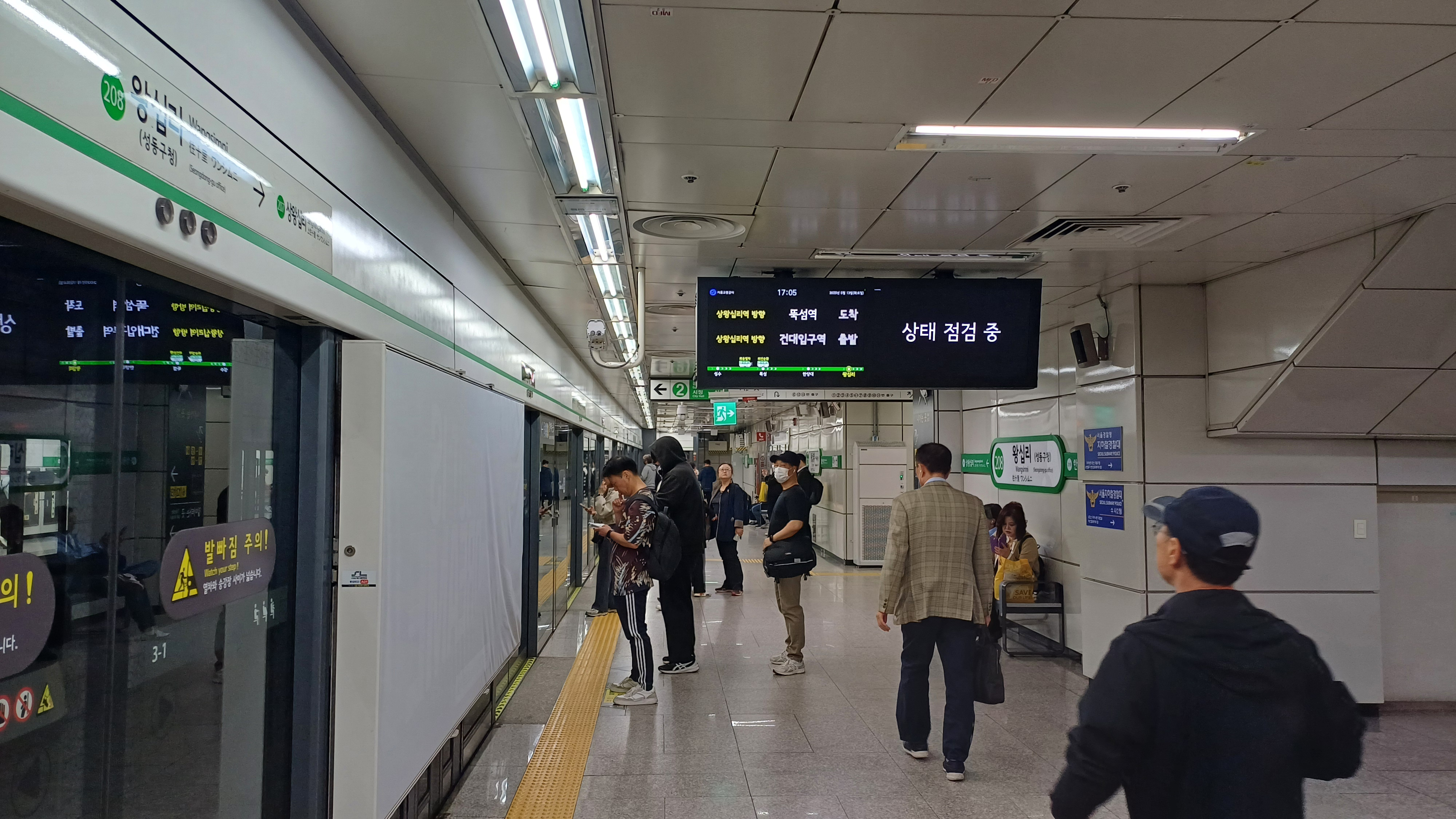
Line 2 platform

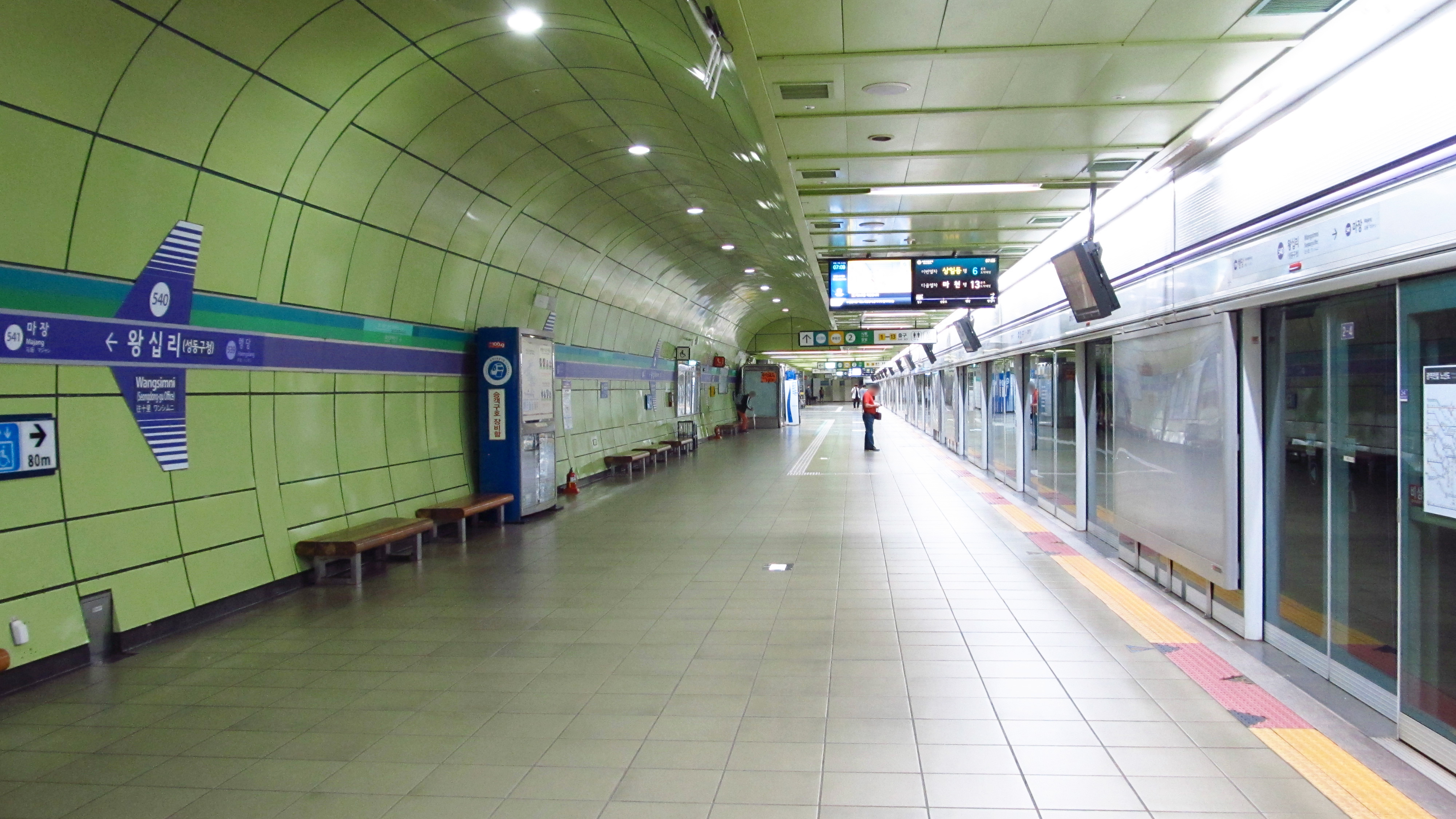
Line 5 platform

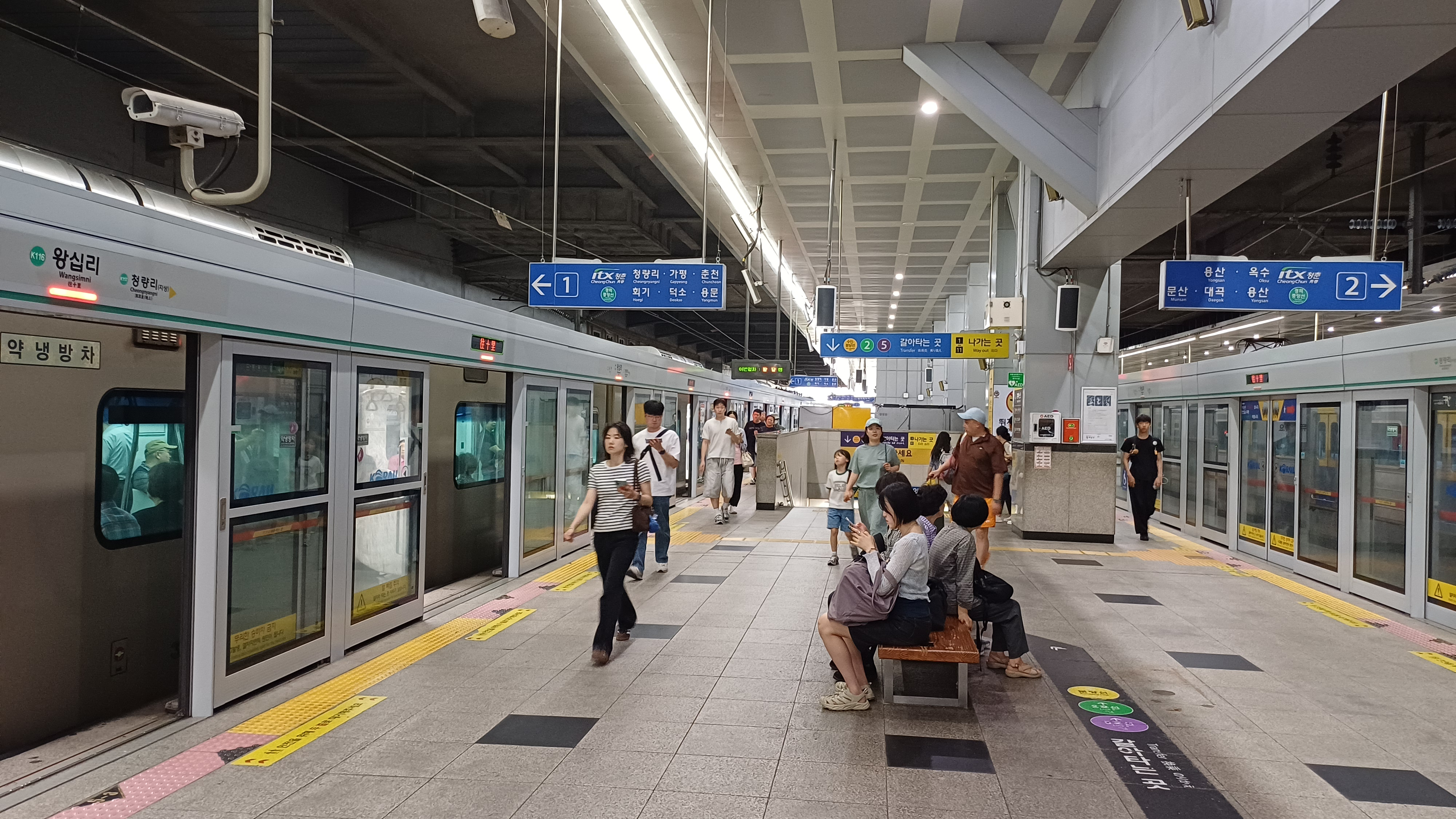
Gyeongui-Jungang Line platforms

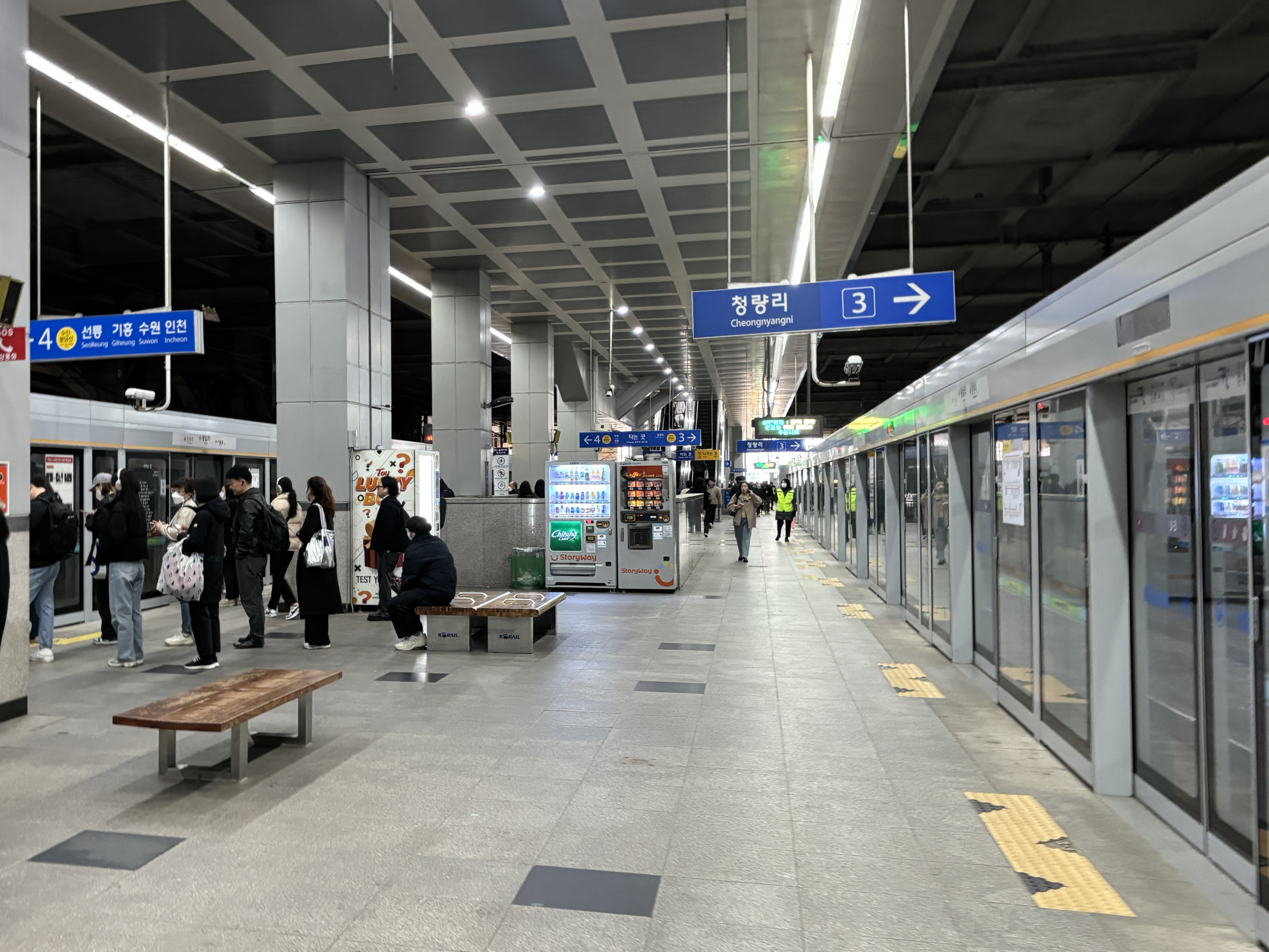
Suin-Bundang Line platforms

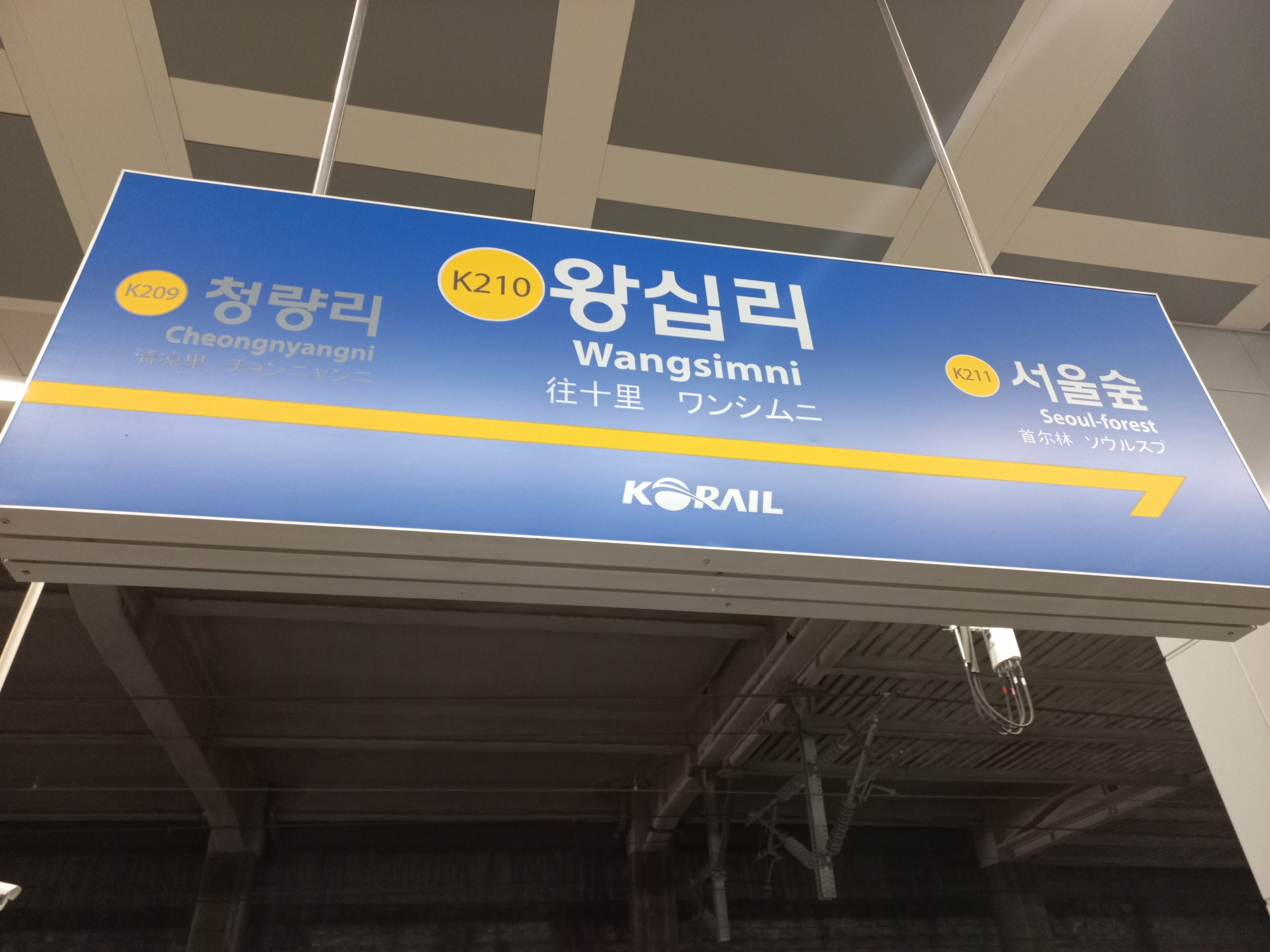
Suin-Bundang Line station nameplate

== Station layout ==
=== Korail Lines ===
↑ Cheongnyangni / ↑ Cheongnyangni

| 12 | | 34 |
Eungbong↓ / Seoul Forest↓

1	Gyeongui-Jungang Line	For Cheongnyangni, Deokso, Yongmun, Jipyeong
1	ITX-Cheongchun	For Cheongnyangni, Chuncheon
2	Gyeongui-Jungang Line	For Oksu, Daegok, Munsan
3	Suin-Bundang Line	For Cheongnyangni or Alighting Passengers Only
4	Suin-Bundang Line	For Seolleung, Moran, Suwon, Oido, Incheon

=== Line 2 ===
Sangwangsimni ↑
Inner | | Outer
↓ Hanyang University

Inner circle	Line 2	Counterclockwise
Outer circle	Line 2	Clockwise

=== Line 5 ===
Haengdang ↑
E/B | | W/B
↓ Majang

Westbound	Line 5	For Yeouido, Gimpo International Airport, Banghwa, Cheonggu
Eastbound	Line 5	For Gunja, Cheonho, Hanam Geomdansan, Macheon, Gangdong

== Bitplex ==
In September 2008, Wangsimni station was remodeled to a private invested station. This station became multiplex space with several major features down below.

- CGV IMAX: movie theater with the largest IMAX screen in South Korea
- Four Season: The only downtown water park in Seoul
- Enter 6: The largest clothing shopping mall in South Korea
- Emart
- Dome Golf: indoor golf zone

== Surroundings ==
- Hanyang University / Hanyang Women's College
- Salgoji Park
- Seongdong-gu office
- Enter 6
