= Sangwangsimni station =

Train station in South Korea

Coordinates: 37°33′51″N 127°01′46″E

상왕십리; Sangwangsimni
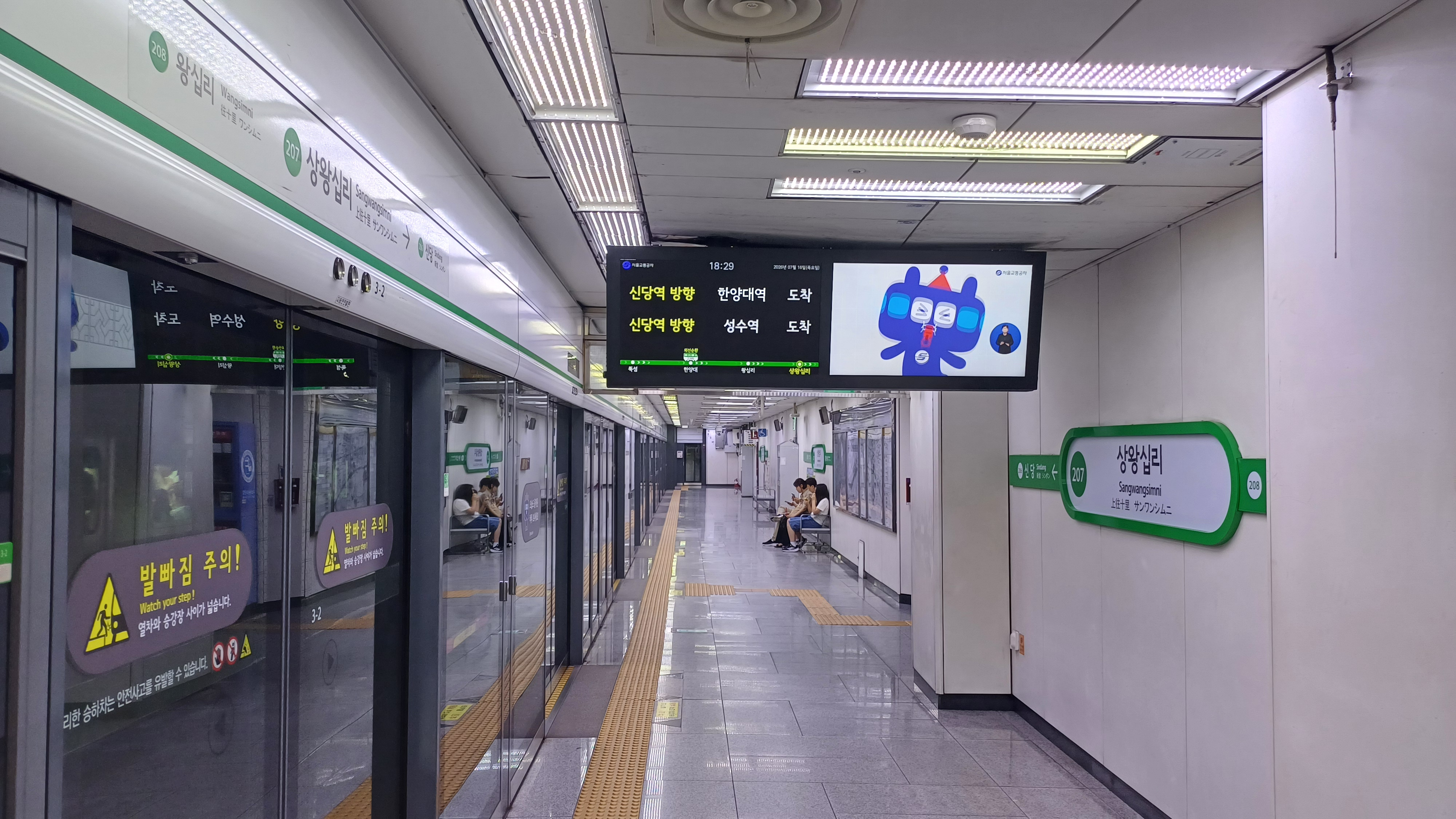
- Station Platform

Korean name
- Hangul: 상왕십리역
- Hanja: 上往十里驛
- Revised Romanization: Sang-wangsimni-yeok
- McCune–Reischauer: Sangwangsimni-yŏk

General information
- Location: 374 Wangsimni-ro jiha, 946-14 Hawangsimni-dong, Seongdong-gu, Seoul
- Operator: Seoul Metro
- Line: Line 2
- Platforms: 2
- Tracks: 2

Construction
- Structure type: Underground

History
- Opened: September 16, 1983

Passengers
- (Daily) Based on Jan-Dec of 2012. Line 2: 18,887

Services
Preceding station	Seoul Metropolitan Subway	Following station
Sindang Next counterclockwise	Line 2	Wangsimni Next clockwise
Location

Sangwangsimni Station is a station on Seoul Subway Line 2 in Seongdong-gu, Seoul, South Korea.

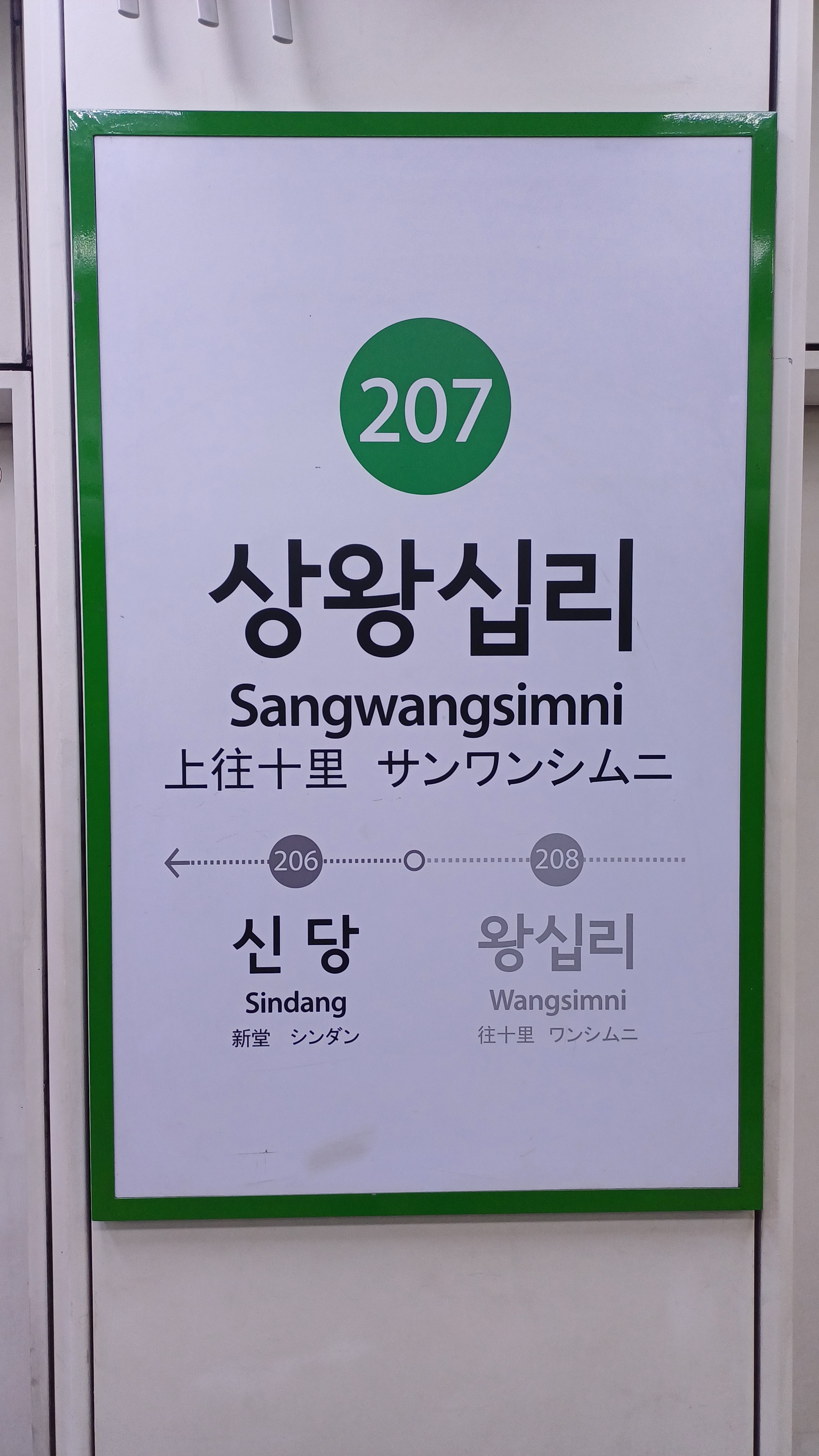
Line 2 station sign

== Station layout ==
G	Street level	Exit

L1; Concourse	Lobby	Customer Service, Shops, Vending machines, ATMs

L2; Platform level	Side platform, doors will open on the right
L2; Platform level	Outer circle	← Line 2 Next counterclockwise (Sindang)
L2; Platform level	Inner circle	Line 2 Next clockwise (Wangsimni) →
L2; Platform level	Side platform, doors will open on the right

== Accident ==
On May 2, 2014 KST, two subway cars collided at Sangwangsimni Station, causing 238 injuries.
