= Geumho-dong, Seoul =

Geumho-dong
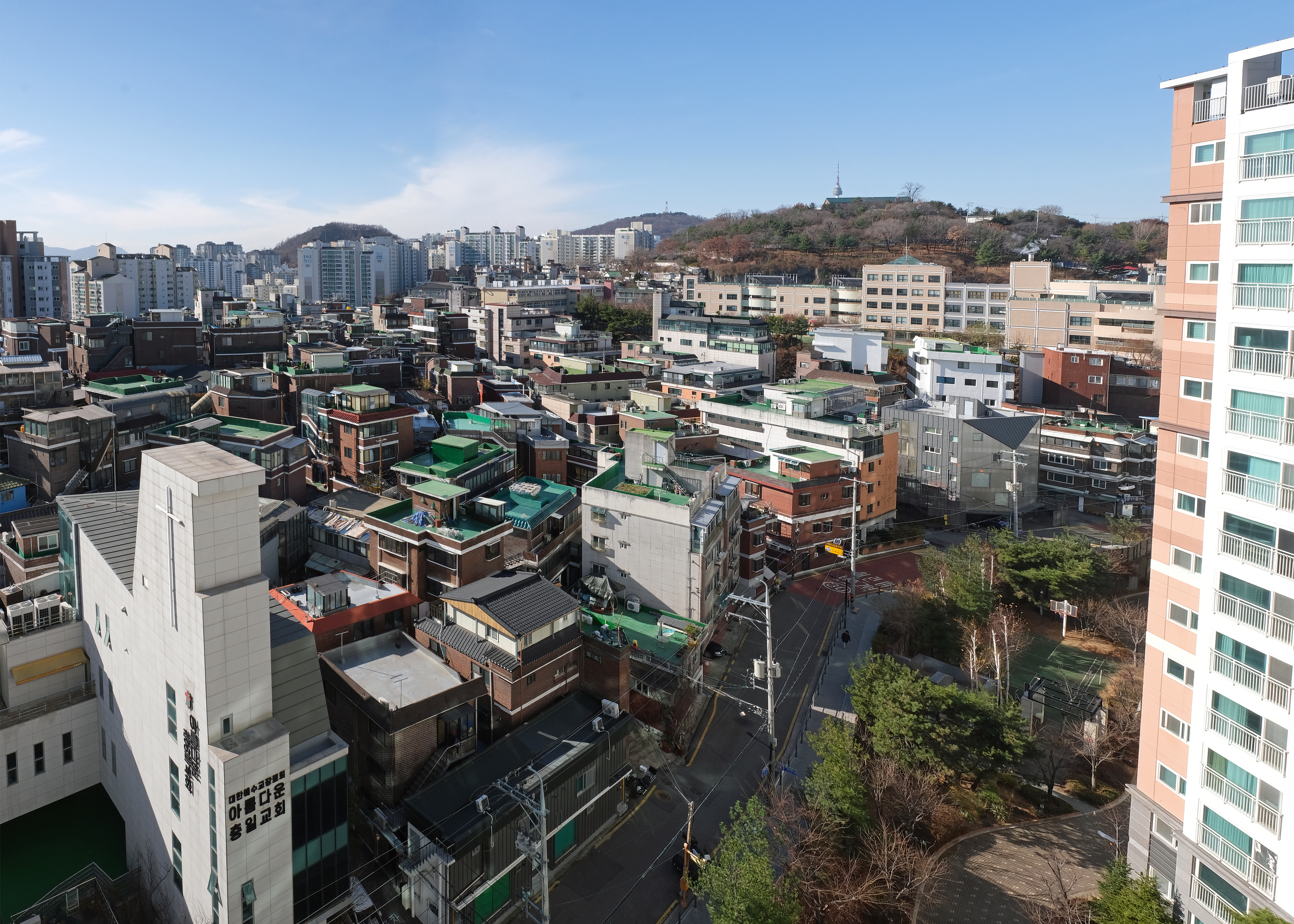
- Interactive map of Geumho-dong
- Coordinates: 37.552°N 127.022°E
- Country: South Korea

Area
  - Total: 1.94 km^{2} (0.75 sq mi)

Population (2001)
  - Total: 60,327
  - Density: 31,100/km^{2} (80,500/sq mi)

Korean name
- Hangul: 금호동
- Hanja: 金湖洞
- RR: Geumho-dong
- MR: Kŭmho-dong

Geumho-dong (Korean: 금호동) is a region that is considered a dong (neighborhood) of Seongdong District, Seoul, South Korea.

== Local Government ==
The current Geumho dong area is considered to be divided into 4 beopjeongdongs(administrative division that is considered to be "legal status neighbourhoods), which are Geumho dong 1-ga, Geumho dong 2 ga, Geumho dong 3 ga, and Geumho dong 4 ga. In reality the region is administered as 3 haengjeongdongs(administrative division that is considered as neighbourhoods for administrative purposes), which treats Geumho 2 ga and 3 ga as a single neighbourhood.

== History ==
The region was originally known as Sucheoli(水鐵里) or Musumak for it was a town where metal was melted to create different farming tools. The region was also known for its cabbage sellers along with the wangsimni region(located in modern day Haengdang-dong). During a major subdivision change to incorporate the region into the greater seoul metropolitan area in 1946, the region changed its name to geumhodong with the character geum(金) to reflect metal and ho(湖) to reflect the former character su(水) as there were other towns that were also called sucheolli in Mapo District. The region in the 1960s was known as a slum, which the koreans called "Daldongne(달동네, moon town)" but since it went subsequent redevelopment it is now considered as a newly rising town for the wealthy along with Oksu-dong.

== Places and Transport ==
Geumho 3 ga dong area currently hosts the "Cherry blossom festival" ever year in April and there is a market called Geumnam market in the region. The region has two subway stations, Geumho station for Seoul Subway Line 3 and Singeumho station for Seoul Subway Line 5.

== See also ==
- Administrative divisions of South Korea
