= Eungbongsan (Seoul) =

Mountain in South Korea

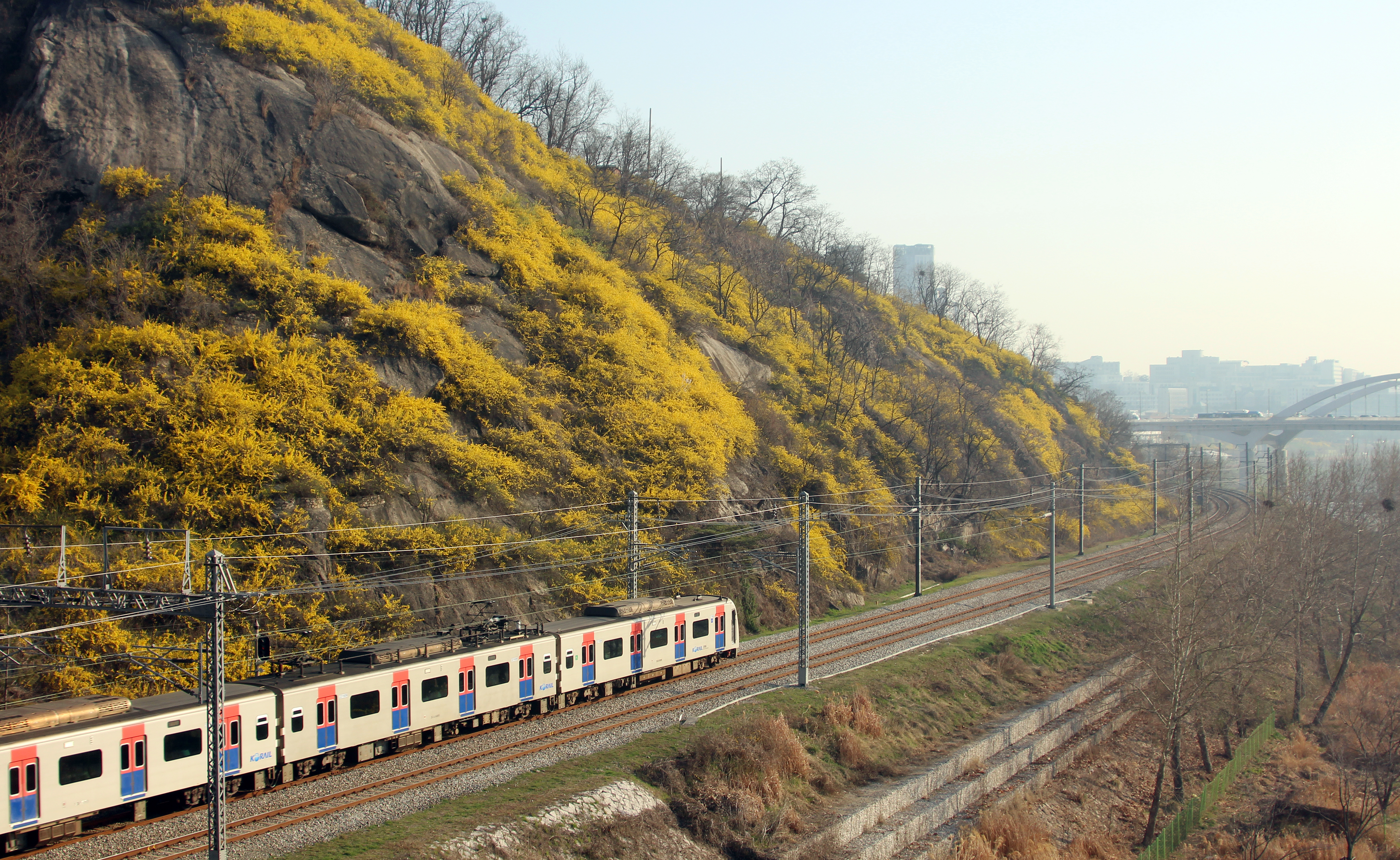
- Springtime at Eungbongsan (2016)

Highest point
- Elevation: 81 m (266 ft)
- Coordinates: 37°32′52″N 127°01′48″E

Geography
- Location: Seongdong District, Eungbong-dong/Geumho-dong, Seoul, South Korea

Korean name
- Hangul: 응봉산
- Hanja: 鷹峰山
- RR: Eungbongsan
- MR: Ŭngbongsan

Eungbongsan (Korean: 응봉산) is a mountain in Eungbong-dong, Seongdong District, South Korea, bordering the Han River. It has an elevation of 94 metres. There is a traditional eight-sided pagoda at the top of the mountain with panoramic views of Seoul Capital Area including Gyeonggi Province.

== History ==
The mountain is located between Eungbong-dong and Geumho-dong and earns its name due to the Joseon king hunting on this mountain with a falcon (Mae in Korean, earning name Maebong), which is Eungbong in Hanja.

== Summary ==
On the way to the top, there is a public recreation area with a playground, rock climbing wall, and a swaying bridge. The mountain is also popular in the spring due to the yellow flowers on the way to the top.

On the top, there is a traditional eight sided pagoda with cultural information and views of the Han River, Seoul, Seoul Forest, Namsan, and Cheonggyesan. As the mountain is at the intersection of the Han River and Jungnangcheon, migratory birds can also be seen.

The mountain is one of the most popular places for photographers to take photos of Seoul, due to its panoramic views of the city, especially at night, combined with its accessibility.

== Gallery ==
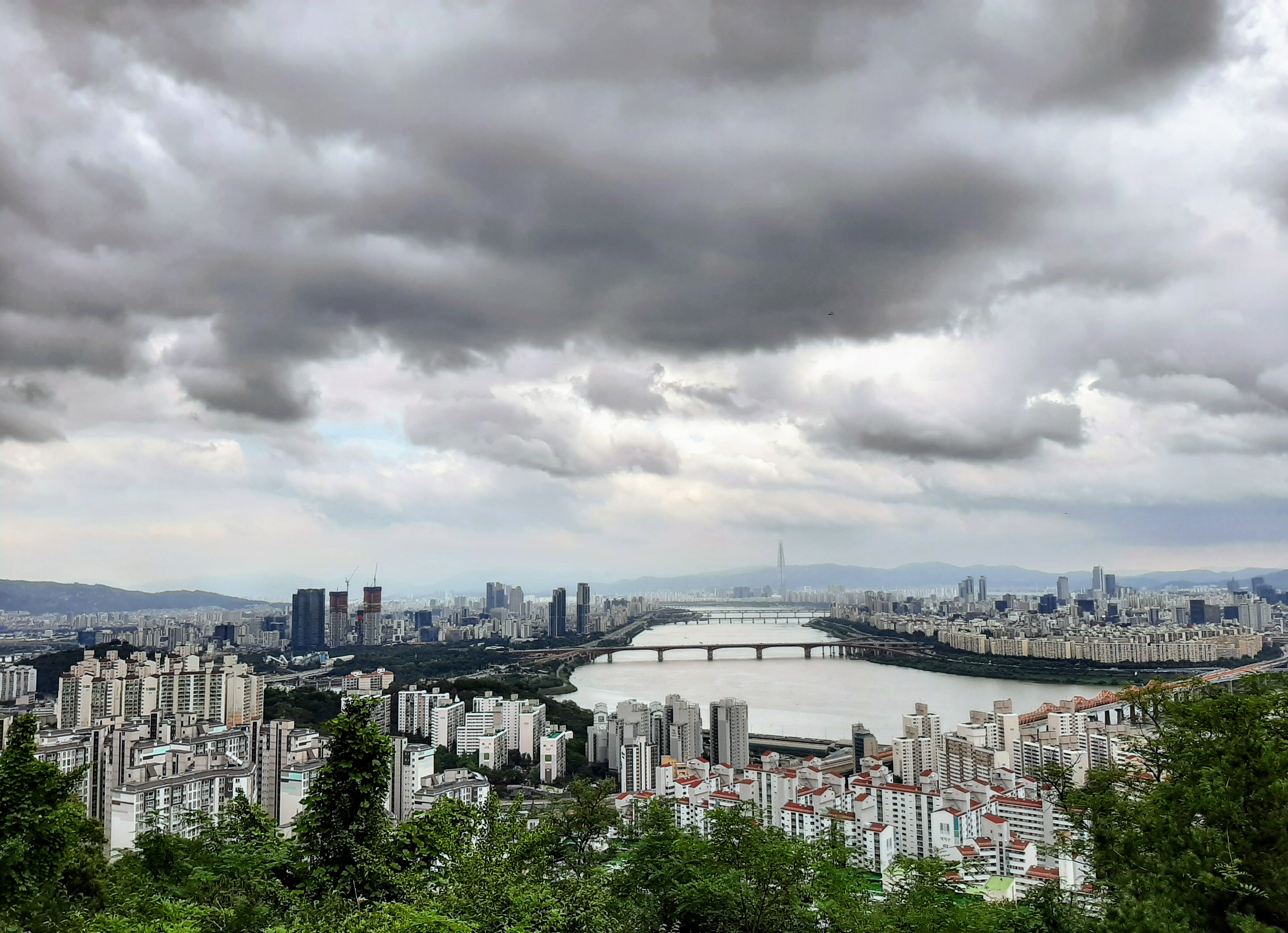
View of Seoul. This photo is not made from the pagoda atop Eungbongsan (2019) but from another octagon pavilion on Maebongsan, right between Eungbonsan and N Seoul Tower.

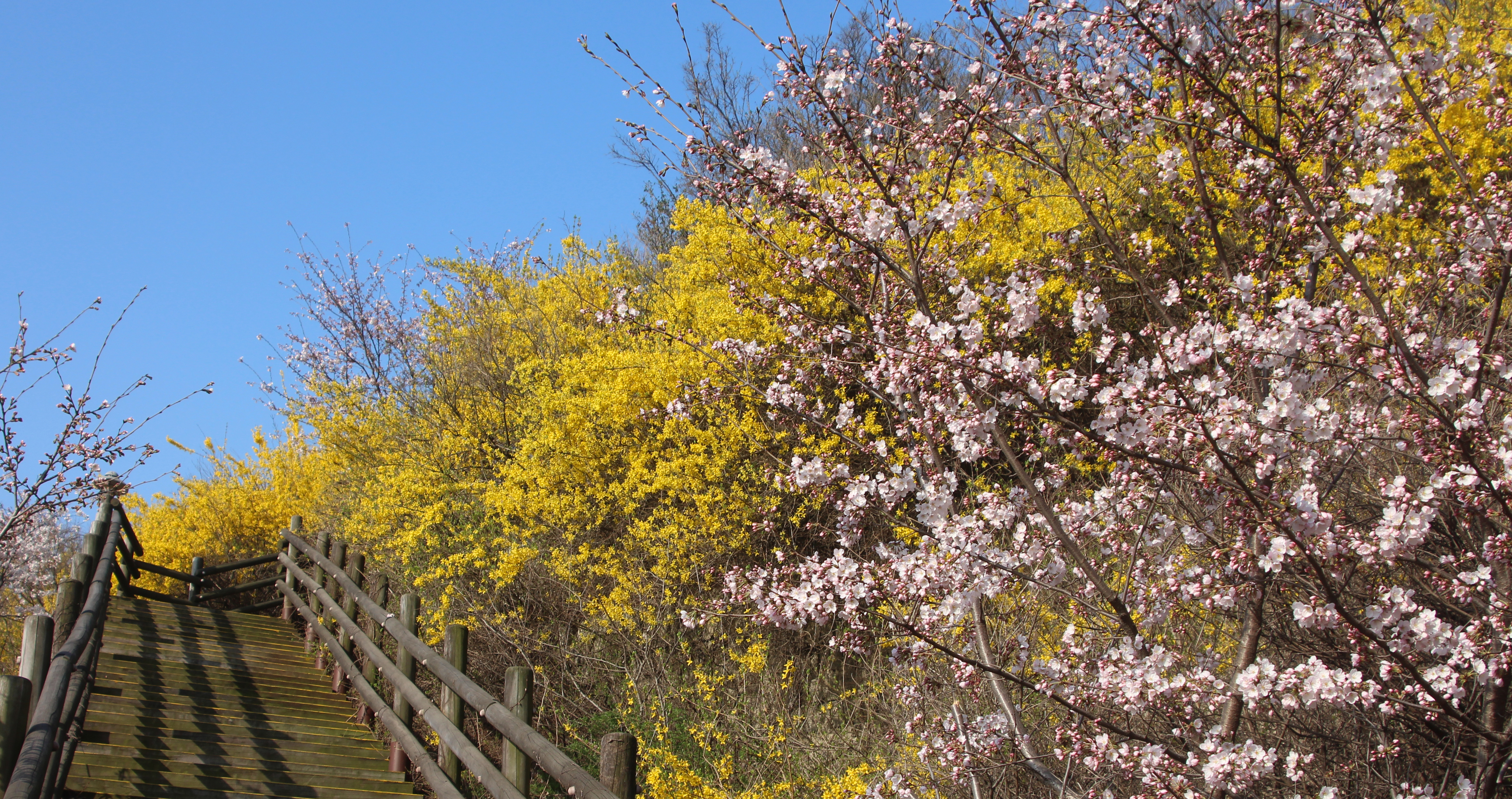
The mountain in spring (2016)

== See also ==
- Eungbong-dong
- List of mountains of Korea
