= Hanyang University station =

Train station in South Korea

한양대; Hanyang Univ.
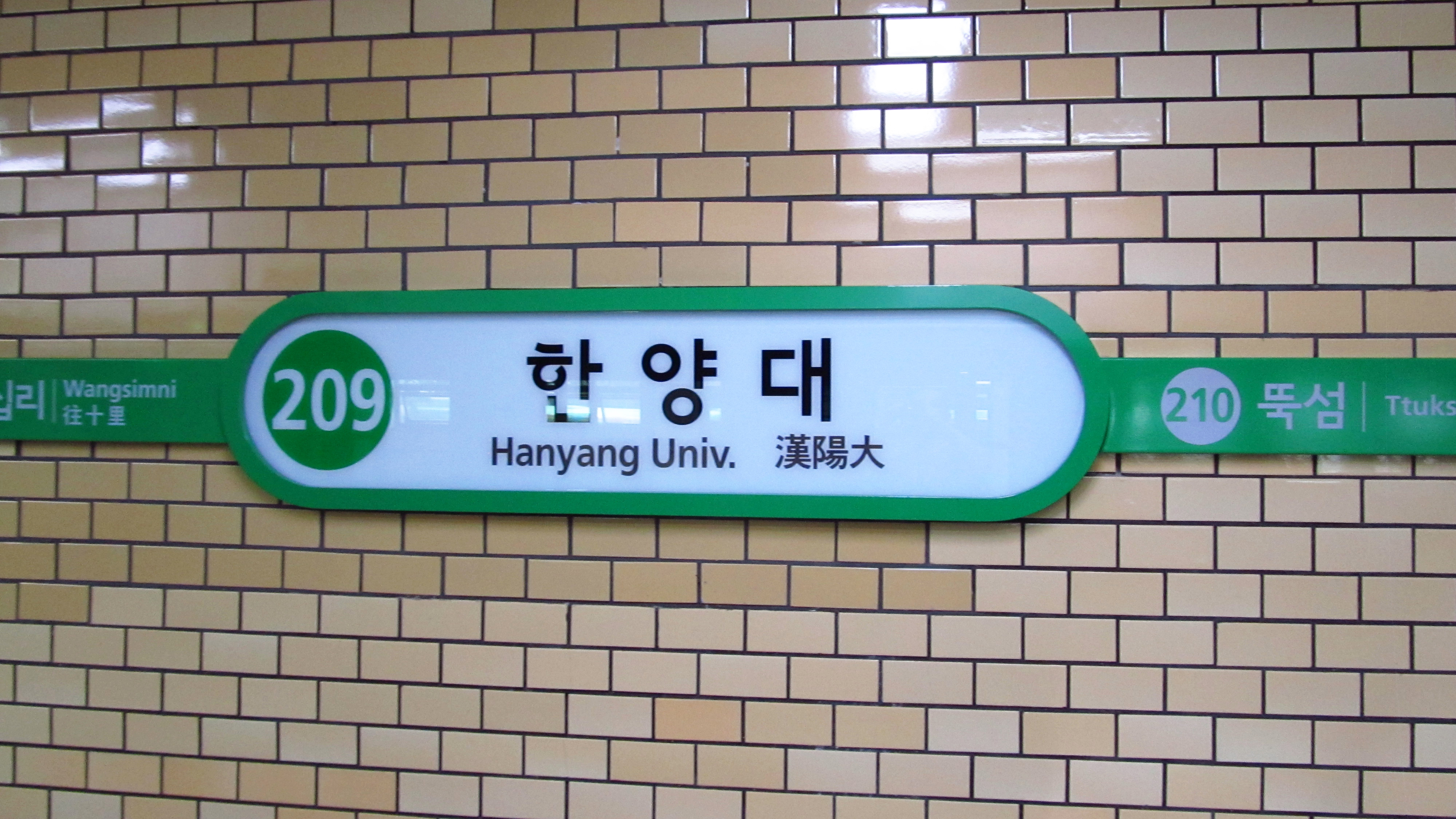
- Station Sign

Korean name
- Hangul: 한양대역
- Hanja: 漢陽大驛
- Revised Romanization: Hanyangdae-yeok
- McCune–Reischauer: Hanyangdae-yŏk

General information
- Location: 206 Wangsimni-ro, Haengdang-dong San 17, Seongdong-gu, Seoul
- Coordinates: 37°33′19″N 127°02′37″E
- Operator: Seoul Metro
- Line: Line 2
- Platforms: 2
- Tracks: 2

Construction
- Structure type: One side overground and one side underground

History
- Opened: September 16, 1983

Passengers
- (Daily) Based on Jan-Dec of 2012. Line 2: 27,049

Services
Preceding station	Seoul Metropolitan Subway	Following station
Wangsimni Next counterclockwise	Line 2	Ttukseom Next clockwise
Location

Hanyang University Station (Korean: 한양대역) is a station on the Seoul Subway Line 2. This partially underground station lies within the Hanyang University campus, and is located in Haengdang-dong, Seongdong District, Seoul.

== Station layout ==
G	Street level	Exit

L1; Concourse	Lobby	Customer Service, Shops, Vending machines, ATMs

L2; Platform level	Side platform, doors will open on the right
L2; Platform level	Outer circle	← Line 2 Next counterclockwise (Wangsimni)
L2; Platform level	Inner circle	Line 2 Next clockwise (Ttukseom) →
L2; Platform level	Side platform, doors will open on the right
