= Haengdang station =

Train station in South Korea

행당; Haengdang
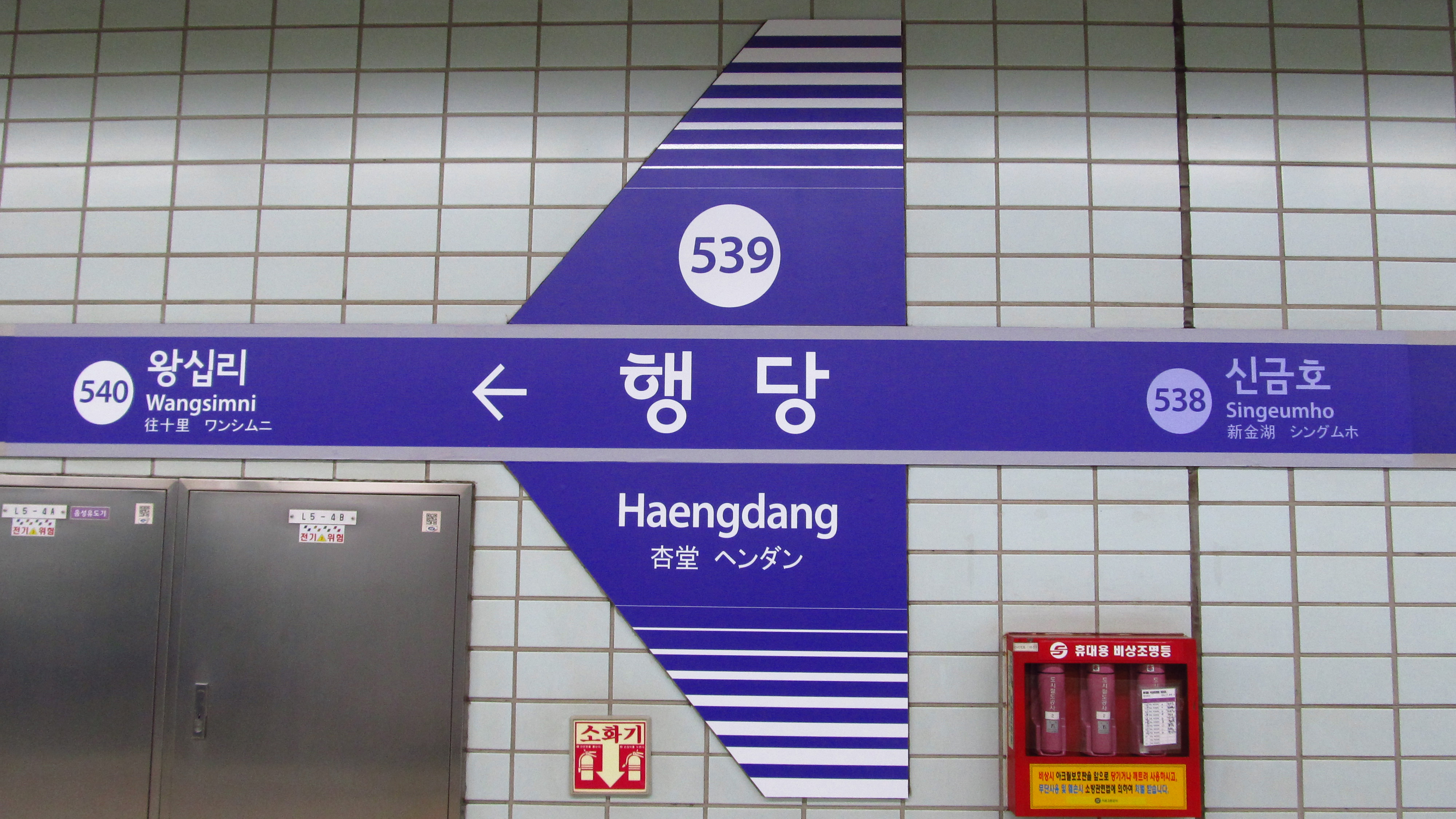

Korean name
- Hangul: 행당역
- Hanja: 杏堂驛
- Revised Romanization: Haengdangnyeok
- McCune–Reischauer: Haengdangnyŏk

General information
- Location: 89 Haengdangno Jiha, 317-241 Haengdang 2-dong, Seongdong-gu, Seoul
- Coordinates: 37°33′27″N 127°01′47″E
- Operator: Seoul Metro
- Line: Line 5
- Platforms: 2
- Tracks: 2

Construction
- Structure type: Underground

History
- Opened: December 30, 1996

Services
Preceding station	Seoul Metropolitan Subway	Following station
Singeumho towards Banghwa	Line 5	Wangsimni towards Hanam Geomdansan or Macheon
Location

Haengdang Station is a station on the Seoul Subway Line 5 in Seongdong District, Seoul, South Korea.

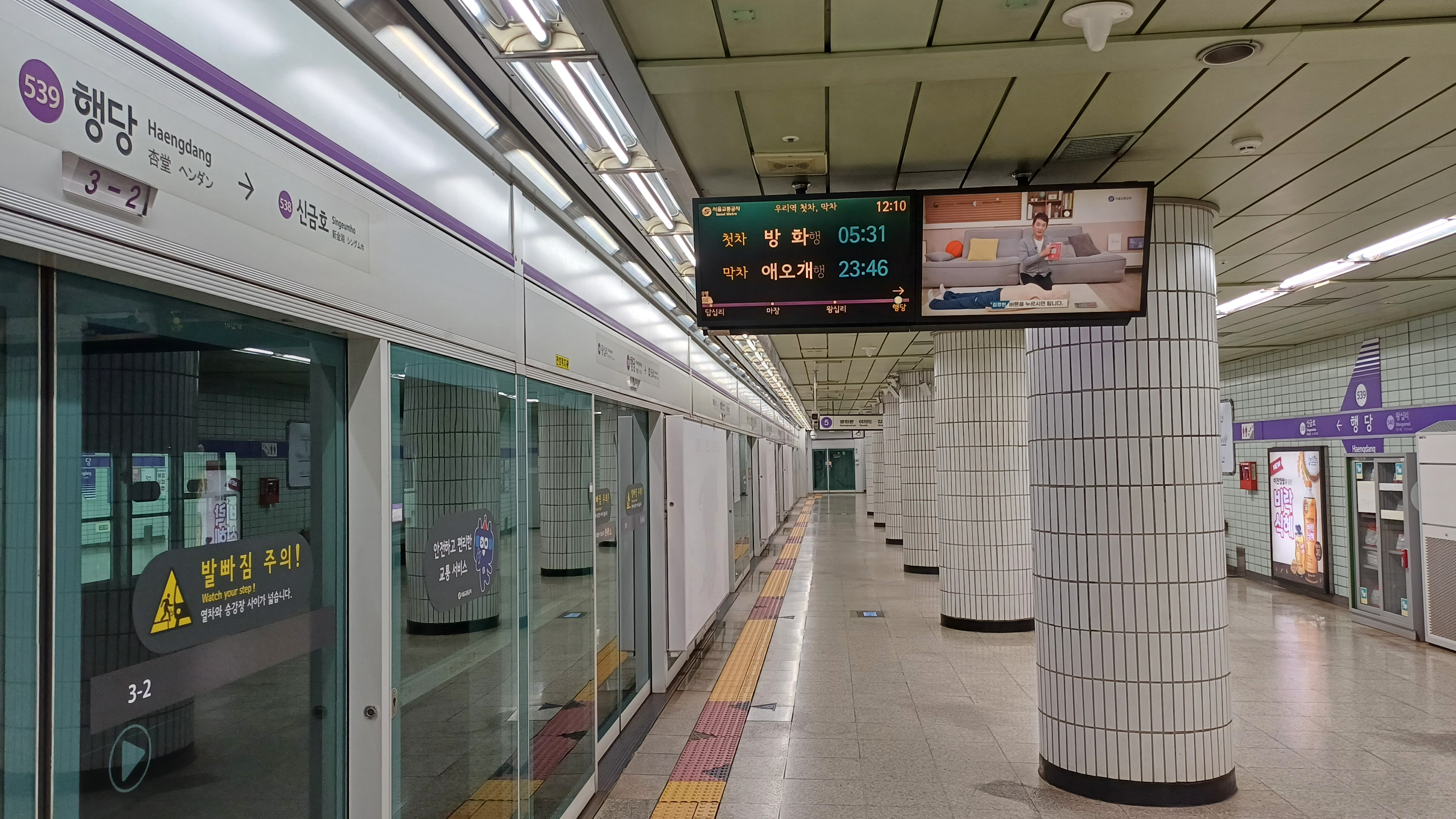

== Station layout ==
G	Street level	Exit

L1; Concourse	Lobby	Customer Service, Shops, Vending machines, ATMs

L2; Platforms	Side platform, doors will open on the right
L2; Platforms	Westbound	← Line 5 toward Banghwa (Singeumho)
L2; Platforms	Eastbound	Line 5 toward Hanam Geomdansan or Macheon (Wangsimni)→
L2; Platforms	Side platform, doors will open on the right
