= Sangwangsimni-dong =

- Country: South Korea

Korean name
- Hangul: 상왕십리동
- Hanja: 上往十里洞
- RR: Sangwangsimni-dong
- MR: Sangwangsimni-dong

Sangwangsimni-dong (Korean: 상왕십리동) is a dong (neighbourhood) of Seongdong District, Seoul, South Korea.

== See also ==
- Administrative divisions of South Korea
