= Hongik-dong =

- Country: South Korea

Korean name
- Hangul: 홍익동
- Hanja: 弘益洞
- RR: Hongik-dong
- MR: Hongik-tong

Hongik-dong (Korean: 홍익동) is a legal dong (neighborhood) of Seongdong District, Seoul, South Korea and governed by its administrative dong, Doseon-dong office.

== See also ==
- Administrative divisions of South Korea
