= Majang station =

Train station in South Korea

Coordinates: 37°33′58″N 127°02′35″E

마장; Majang
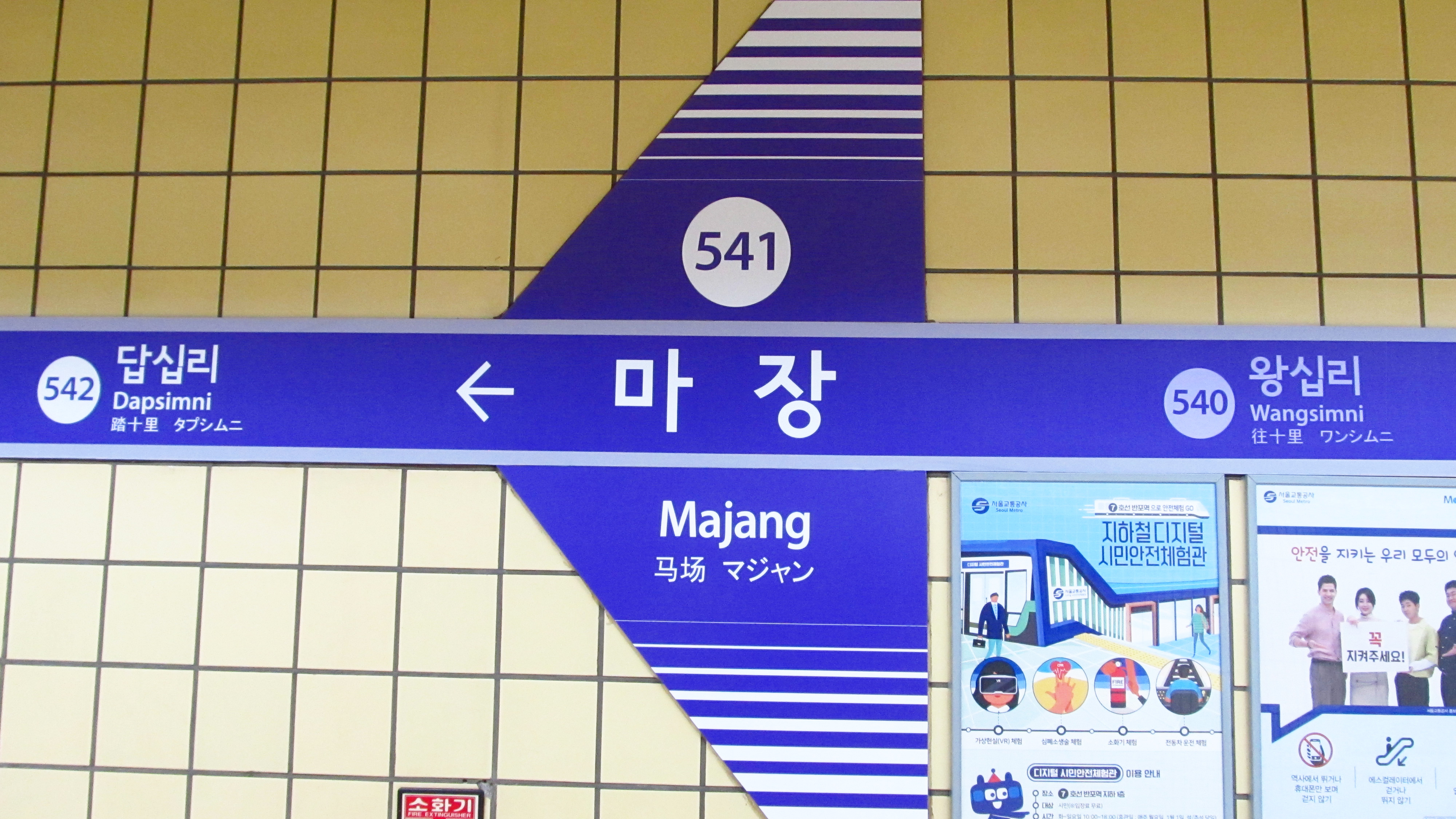

Korean name
- Hangul: 마장역
- Hanja: 馬場驛
- Revised Romanization: Majang-yeok
- McCune–Reischauer: Majang-yŏk

General information
- Location: 296 Majangno Jiha, 772 Majang-dong, Seongdong-gu, Seoul
- Operator: Seoul Metro
- Line: Line 5
- Platforms: 2
- Tracks: 2

Construction
- Structure type: Underground

History
- Opened: November 15, 1995

Services
Preceding station	Seoul Metropolitan Subway	Following station
Wangsimni towards Banghwa	Line 5	Dapsimni towards Hanam Geomdansan or Macheon
Location

Majang Station is a station on Seoul Subway Line 5 in Seongdong-gu, Seoul.

== Station layout ==
G	Street level	Exit

L1; Concourse	Lobby	Customer Service, Shops, Vending machines, ATMs

L2; Platforms	Side platform, doors will open on the right
L2; Platforms	Westbound	← Line 5 toward Banghwa (Wangsimni)
L2; Platforms	Eastbound	Line 5 toward Hanam Geomdansan or Macheon (Dapsimni)→
L2; Platforms	Side platform, doors will open on the right
