= Songjeong-dong, Seoul =

Coordinates: 35°08′N 126°49′E

Songjeong-dong
- Interactive map of Songjeong-dong
- Country: South Korea

Area
  - Total: 0.68 km^{2} (0.26 sq mi)

Population (2001)
  - Total: 15,390
  - Density: 23,000/km^{2} (59,000/sq mi)

Korean name
- Hangul: 송정동
- Hanja: 松亭洞
- RR: Songjeong-dong
- MR: Songjŏng-dong

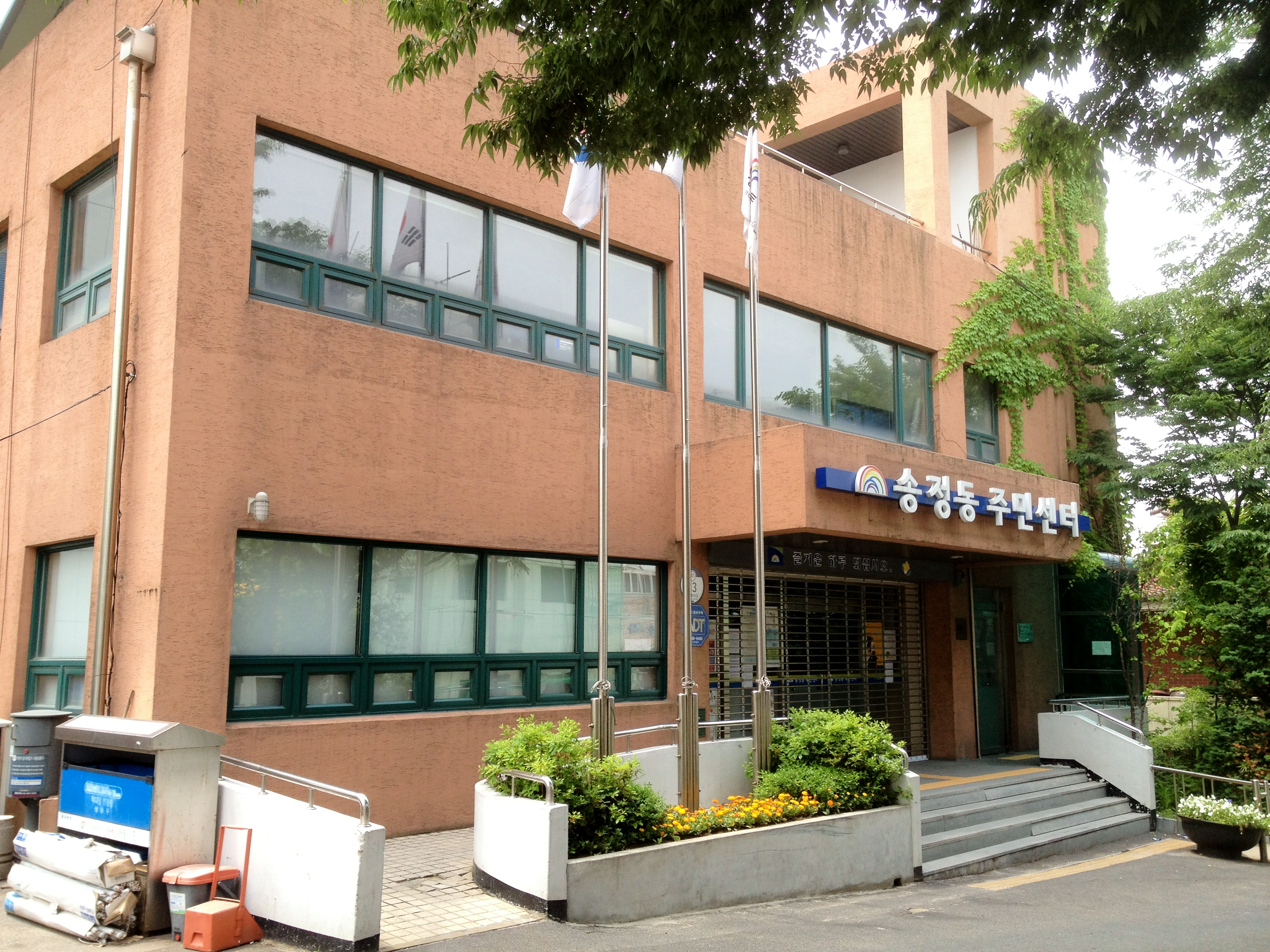
Songjeong-dong Community Service Center

Songjeong-dong (Korean: 송정동) is a dong (neighborhood) of Seongdong District, Seoul, South Korea.

== See also ==
- Administrative divisions of South Korea
