= Ttukseom station =

Subway station in Seoul, South Korea

뚝섬; Ttukseom
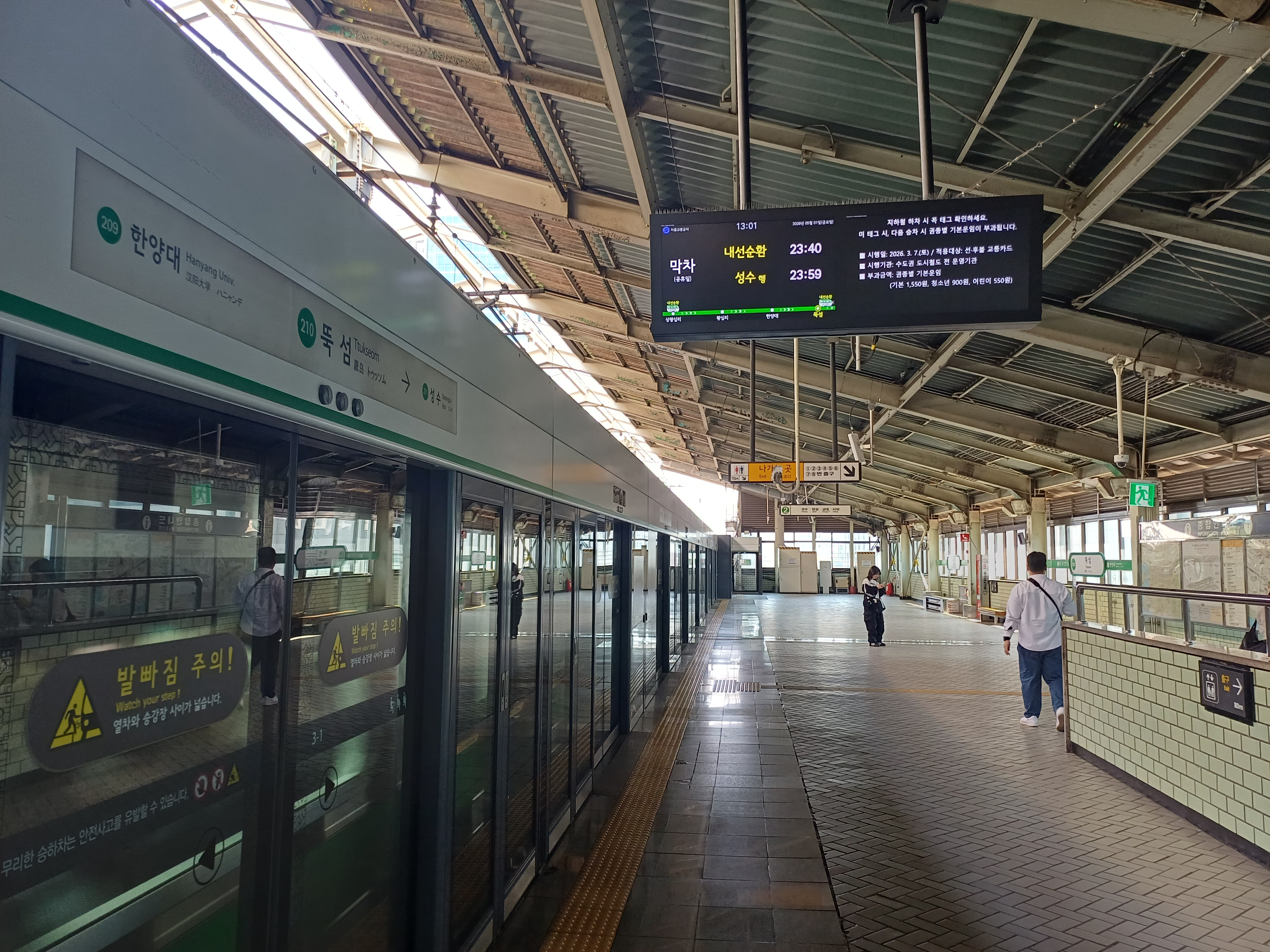
- Station platform

Korean name
- Hangul: 뚝섬역
- Revised Romanization: Ttukseom-yeok
- McCune–Reischauer: Ttuksŏm-yŏk

General information
- Location: 18 Achasan-ro, 656-745 Seongsu 1-ga, Seongdong-gu, Seoul
- Coordinates: 37°32′50″N 127°02′51″E
- Operator: Seoul Metro
- Line: Line 2
- Platforms: 2
- Tracks: 2

Construction
- Structure type: Aboveground

History
- Opened: September 16, 1983

Passengers
- (Daily) Based on Jan-Dec of 2012. Line 2: 32,831

Services
Preceding station	Seoul Metropolitan Subway	Following station
Hanyang University Next counterclockwise	Line 2	Seongsu Next clockwise
Location

Ttukseom Station is a station on the Seoul Subway Line 2.

It is located in Seongsu-dong, Seongdong-gu, Seoul, and is near Seoul Forest.

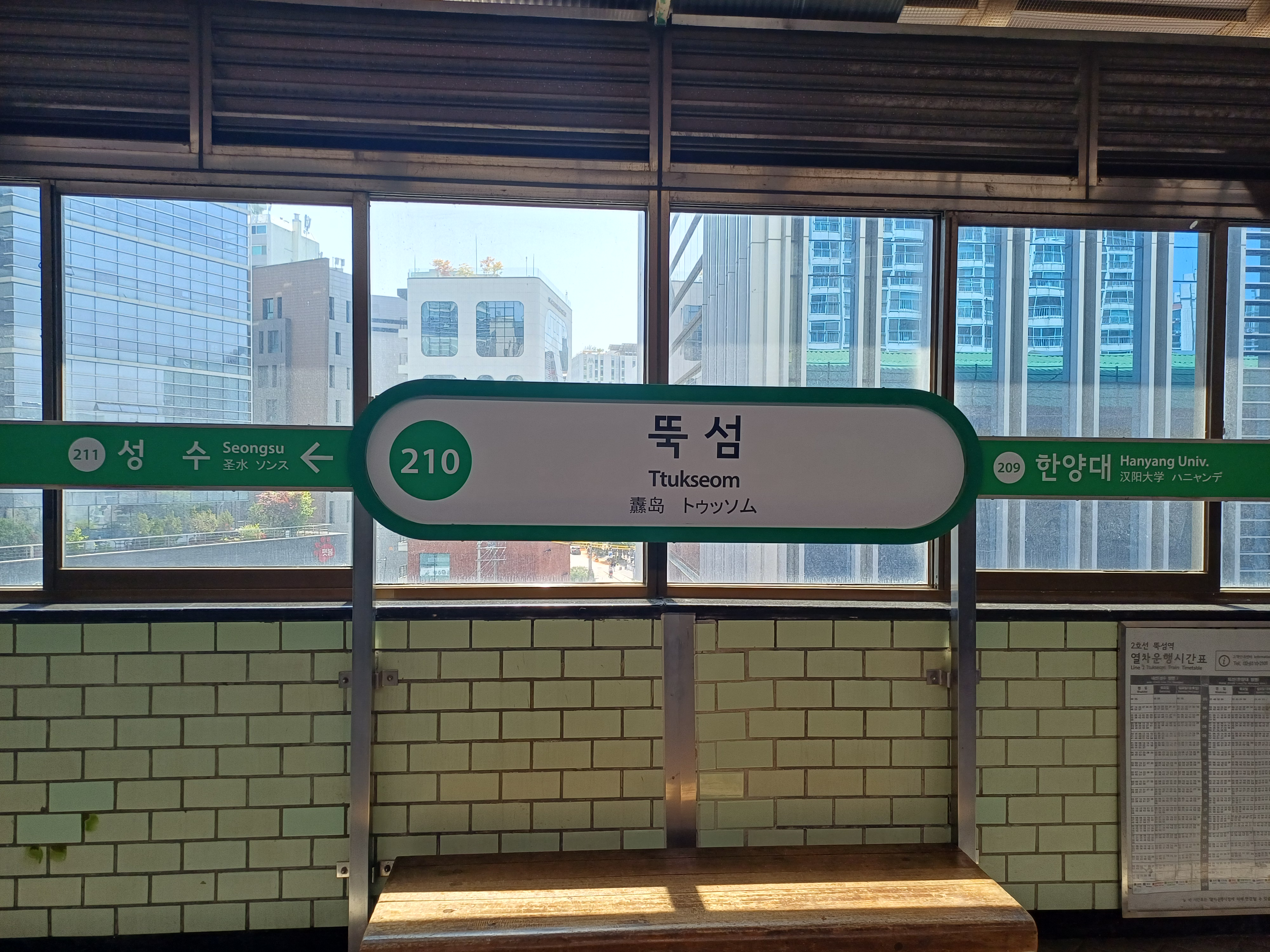
Station nameplate

== Station layout ==
L2; Platform level	Side platform, doors will open on the right
L2; Platform level	Outer circle	← Line 2 Next counterclockwise (Hanyang University)
L2; Platform level	Inner circle	Line 2 Next clockwise (Seongsu) →
L2; Platform level	Side platform, doors will open on the right

L1; Concourse	Lobby	Customer Service, Shops, Vending machines, ATMs

G	Street level	Exit
