= Sageun-dong =

- Interactive map of Sageun-dong
- Country: South Korea

Area
  - Total: 1.11 km^{2} (0.43 sq mi)

Population (2001)
  - Total: 12,779
  - Density: 11,500/km^{2} (29,800/sq mi)

Korean name
- Hangul: 사근동
- Hanja: 沙斤洞
- RR: Sageun-dong
- MR: Sagŭn-dong

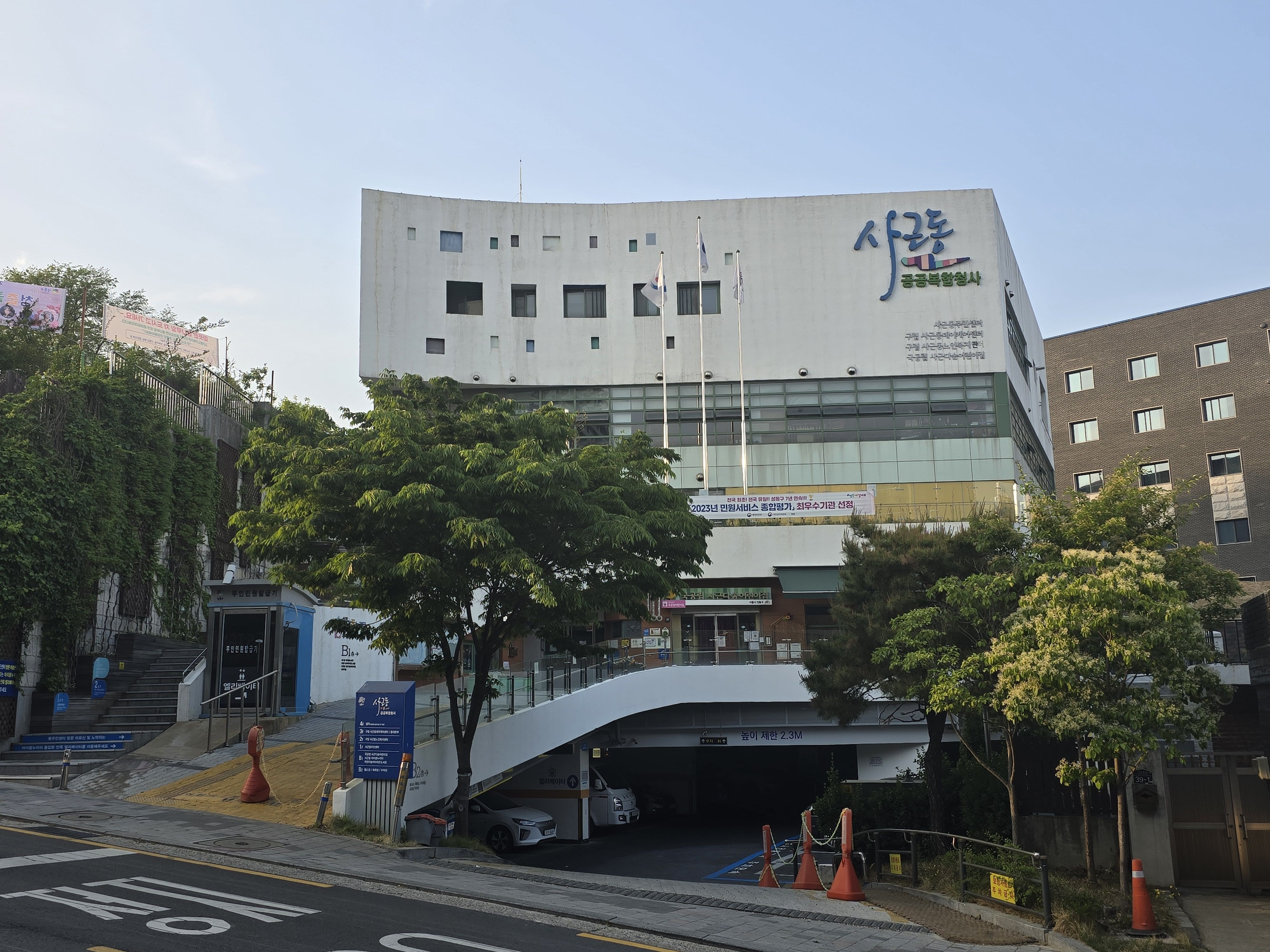
Sagundong Community Center

Sageun-dong (Korean: 사근동) is a dong (neighbourhood) of Seongdong District, Seoul, South Korea.

== See also ==
- Administrative divisions of South Korea
