= Eungbong station =

Rail station in Seoul, South Korea

응봉; Eungbong
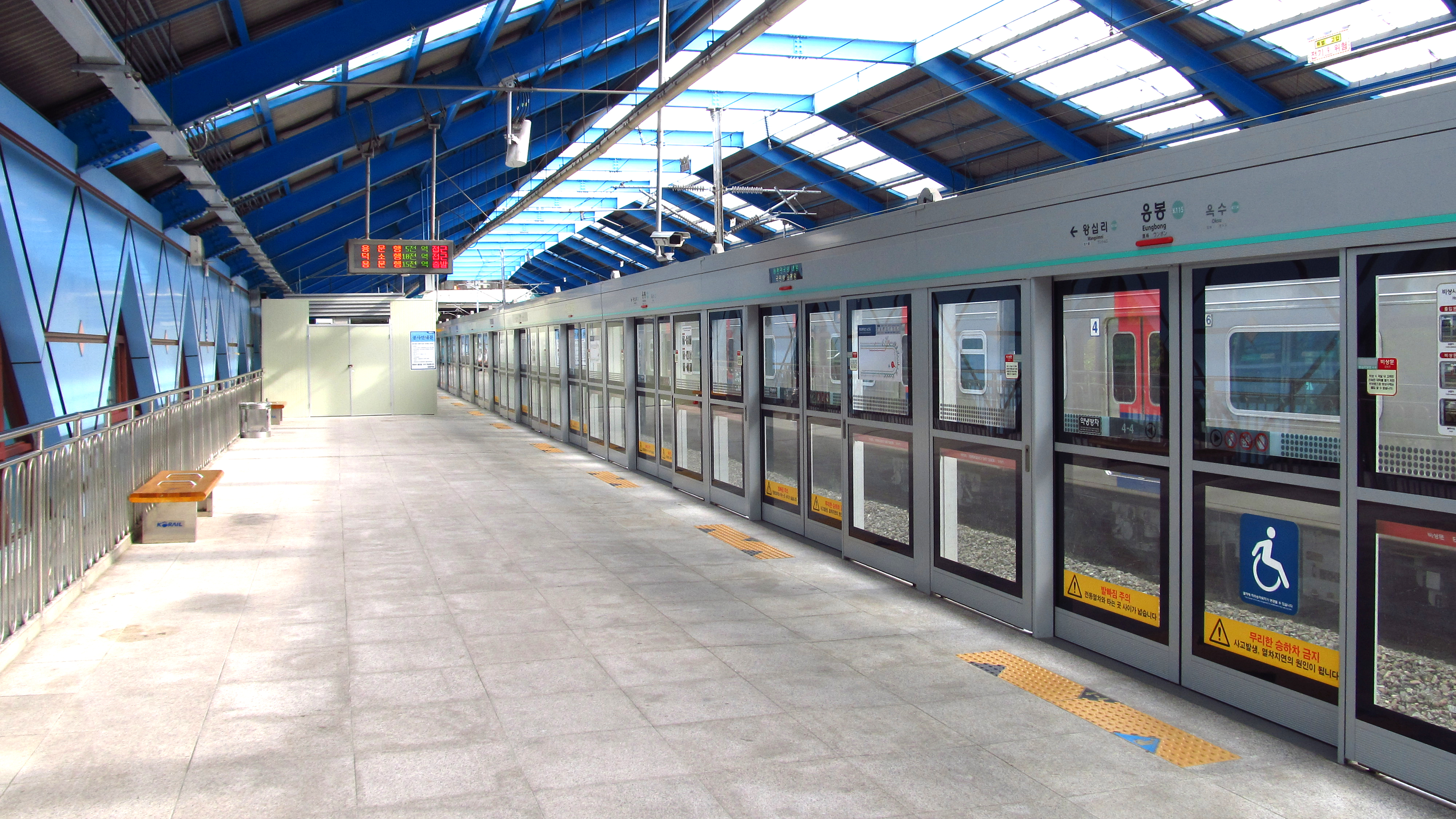

Korean name
- Hangul: 응봉역
- Hanja: 鷹峰驛
- Revised Romanization: Eungbong-yeok
- McCune–Reischauer: Ŭngbong-yŏk

General information
- Location: 246 Eungbong-dong, Seongdong-gu, Seoul
- Coordinates: 37°33′3.00″N 127°2′6.66″E
- Operator: Korail
- Line: Gyeongui–Jungang Line
- Platforms: 2
- Tracks: 2

Construction
- Structure type: Aboveground

History
- Opened: December 9, 1978 (as part of Line 1)

Key dates
- December 16, 2005: Gyeongui–Jungang Line started service
Location

Eungbong is a station on the Gyeongui–Jungang Line.

== Station layout ==
G	Street level	Exit

L1; Concourse	Lobby	Customer service, shops, vending machines, ATMs

L2; Platform	Side platform, doors will open on the right
L2; Platform	Northbound	← Gyeongui–Jungang Line toward Munsan (Oksu)
L2; Platform	Southbound	Gyeongui–Jungang Line toward Jipyeong (Wangsimni) →
L2; Platform	Side platform, doors will open on the left

== Vicinity ==
- Exit 1: Eungbong Elementary School, Gwanghui Middle School

Preceding station	Seoul Metropolitan Subway	Following station
Oksu towards Munsan	Gyeongui–Jungang Line	Wangsimni towards Jipyeong
Oksu towards Munsan	Gyeongui–Jungang Line Gyeongui Express	Wangsimni towards Yongmun
