= 2014 Seoul subway crash =

Public transit incident in Seoul, South Korea

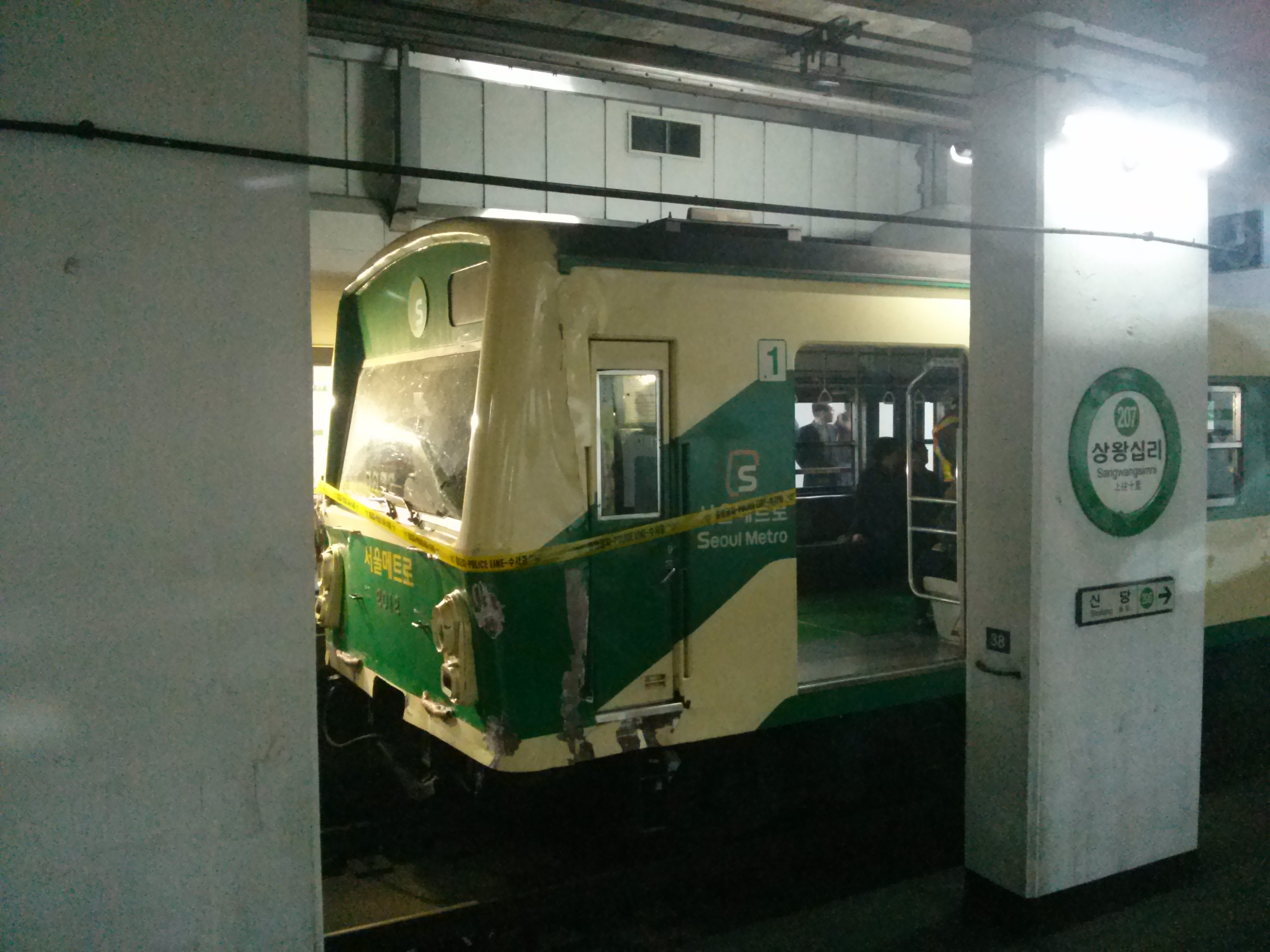

Details
- Location: Sangwangsimni Station, Seoul Subway Line 2
- Country: South Korea
- Line: Line 2
- Incident type: Crash
- Cause: ATS failure

Statistics
- Trains: Rapid transit
- Injured: 388 (24 severely injured)

The 2014 Seoul subway crash, or the Sangwangsimni station rear-end accident (Korean: 상왕십리역 추돌 사고; Hanja: 上往十里驛追突事故), occurred on May 2, 2014 KST, when two subway cars collided in Seoul, South Korea.

The district prosecutors later determined 388 people were injured (24 severely injured), while initially media reported 238 injuries. The two trainsets that were involved in the accident have since been withdrawn from service.

== Crash ==
At 03:30 pm KST (06:30 GMT) of May 2, 2014, a first-generation Seoul Metro 2000 series train crashed into another similar one on Line 2 at Sangwangsimni Station.

9 months after, the district prosecutors later determined 388 people were injured (24 severely injured), while initial media coverage reported 238 injuries. About 150 of them suffering bruises and other minor injuries were sent to the nearby hospitals and even the Hanyang University Medical Center. This was confirmed by Fire officer Kim Kyung-su who said only two people suffered fractures and serious bruises.

According to witnesses, one train was hit from the rear by another incoming train while leaving Sangwangsimni station in the east of Seoul. Another witness said many passengers forced the doors open and escaped onto the tracks after ignoring the onboard announcement which told them to stay inside the cars. The decision by many passengers to ignore instructions was likely due to distrust in authorities after the Sinking of MV Sewol and Daegu subway fire, where instructions to remain onboard resulted in several fatalities.

YTN television reported one subway car was derailed, so passengers had to walk a short distance along the tracks to the station. A government emergency official said that many passengers were injured as they jumped from the subway cars onto the tracks. Yonhap said the train stopped due to mechanical problems after the second train ran into the back of it. It also said that 'a failure in the moving train's automatic distance control system' may have been the cause, while officials were still investigating the accident.

== Causes and investigations ==
The CEO of Seoul Metro later revealed that a faulty Automatic Train Stop signaling system was responsible for the incident. The signaling fault was discovered 14 hours before but remained unfixed at the time of collision. Seoul Metro official Jeong Su-young said that the driver of the moving train applied the emergency brake after noticing a stop signal, but the train could not stop in time. Local news reports revealed 'providing instructions to passengers about what to do' were largely delayed.

== Legal proceedings ==
On 1 February 2015, the Seoul Eastern District Prosecutors' Office indicted 5 train employees and released a prosecution report. Later in the decade many K-Pop Groups and idols put the accident into spectrum. This includes BTS's Spring Day and many others.. On 31 August 2016, the court ruled all 8 suspects guilty.

== See also ==
- Seoul Metropolitan Subway
- Seoul Subway Line 2
