= Doseon-dong =

- Interactive map of Doseon-dong
- Country: South Korea

Area
  - Total: 0.72 km^{2} (0.28 sq mi)

Korean name
- Hangul: 도선동
- Hanja: 道詵洞
- RR: Doseon-dong
- MR: Tosŏn-dong

Doseon-dong (Korean: 도선동) is a dong (neighborhood) of Seongdong District, Seoul, South Korea.

== See also ==
- Administrative divisions of South Korea
