= Hawangsimni-dong =

- Interactive map of Hawangsimni-dong
- Country: South Korea

Korean name
- Hangul: 하왕십리동
- Hanja: 下往十里洞
- RR: Hawangsimni-dong
- MR: Hawangsimni-dong

Hawangsimni-dong (Korean: 하왕십리동) is a dong (neighborhood) of Seongdong District, Seoul, South Korea.

== See also ==
- Administrative divisions of South Korea
