= Seongdong District =

District of Seoul, South Korea

Seongdong
- Autonomous District
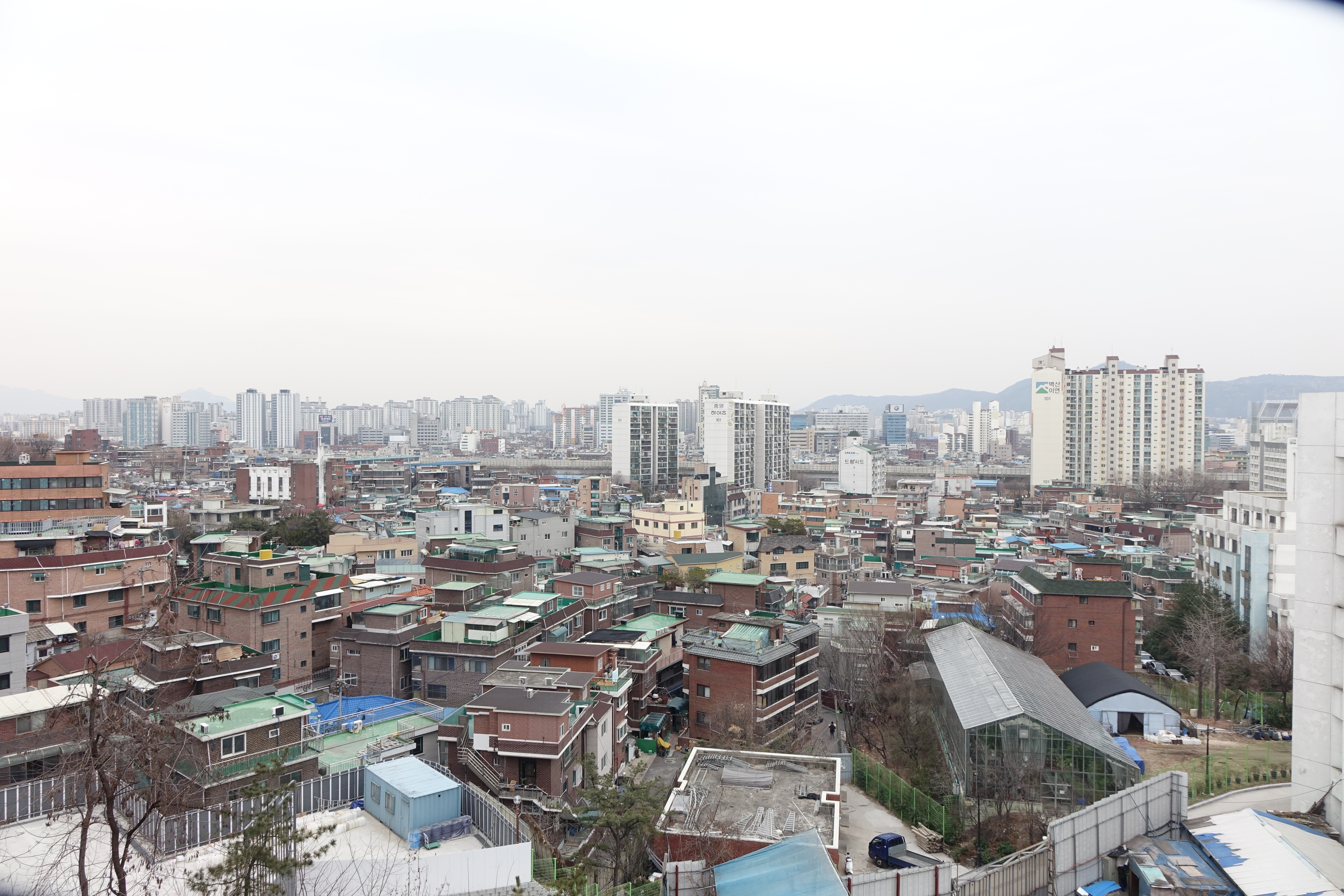
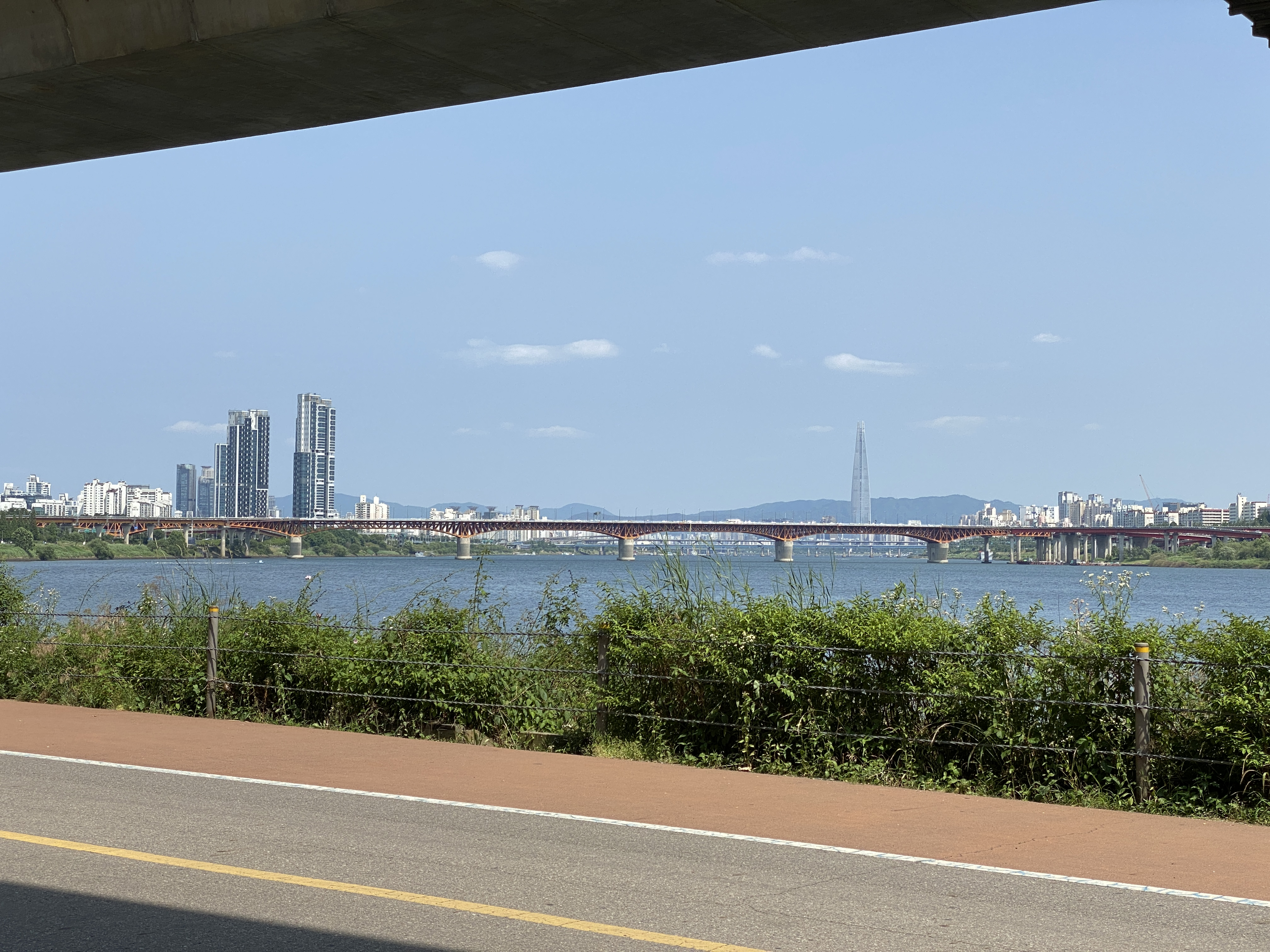
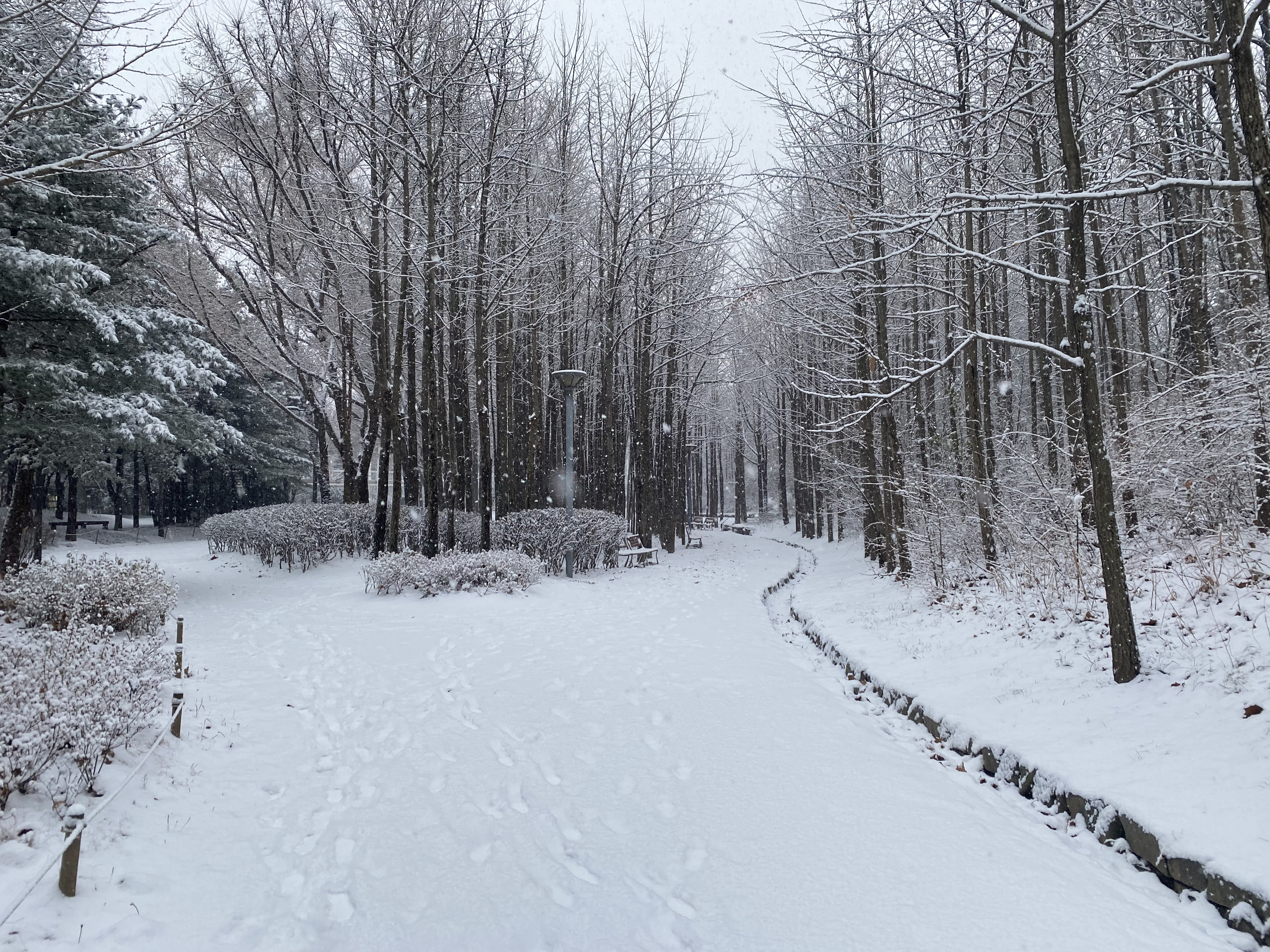
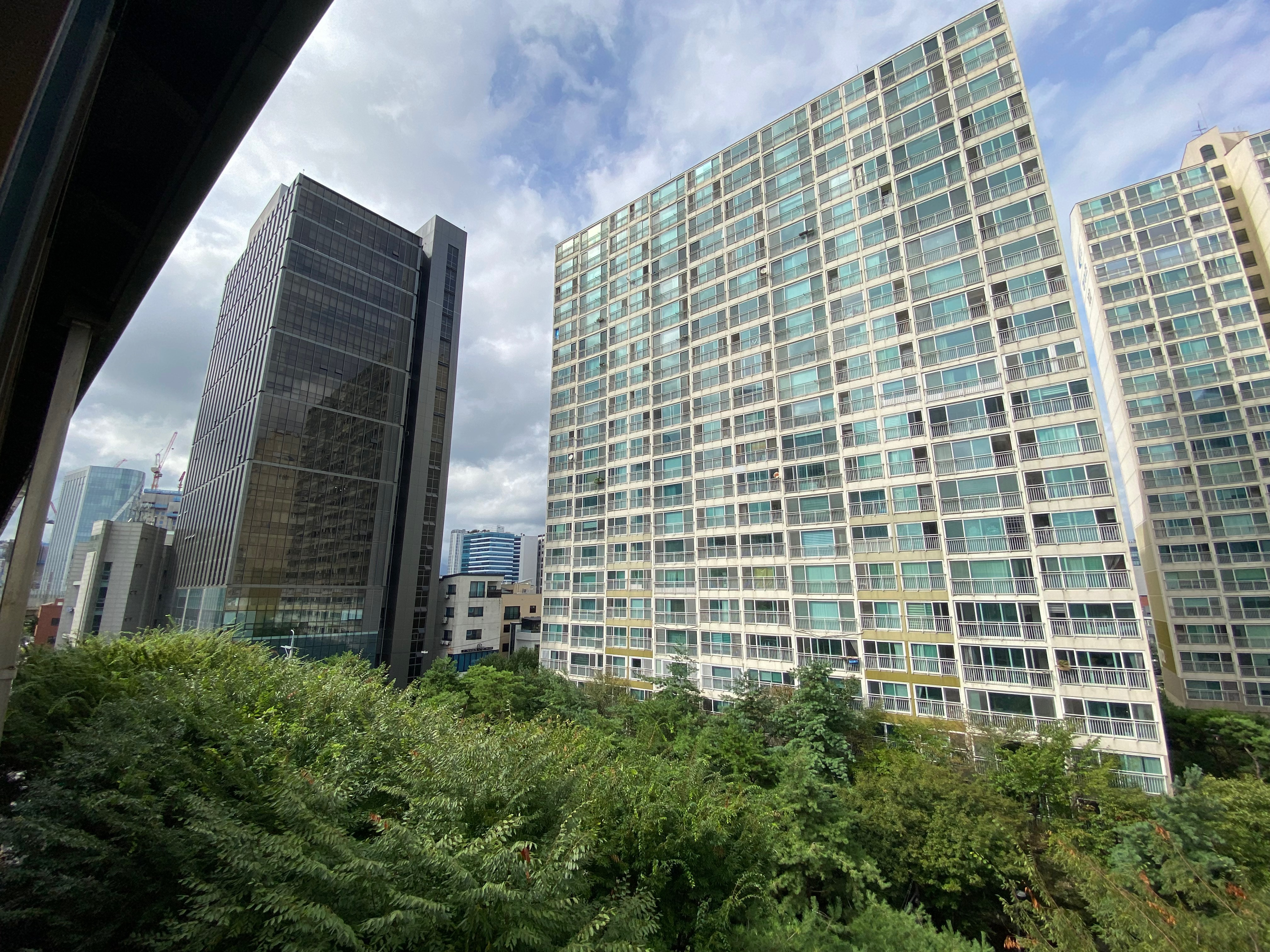
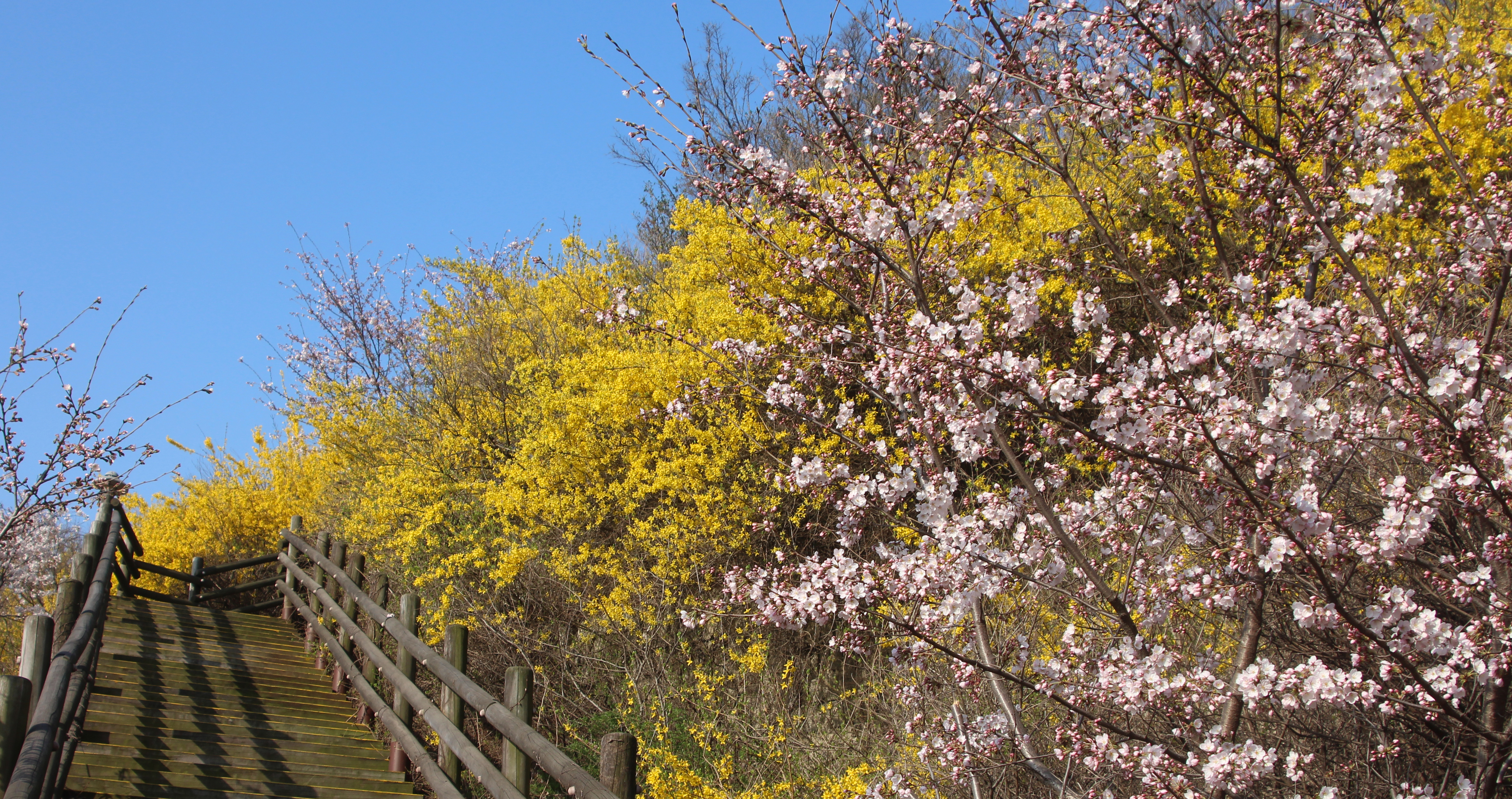
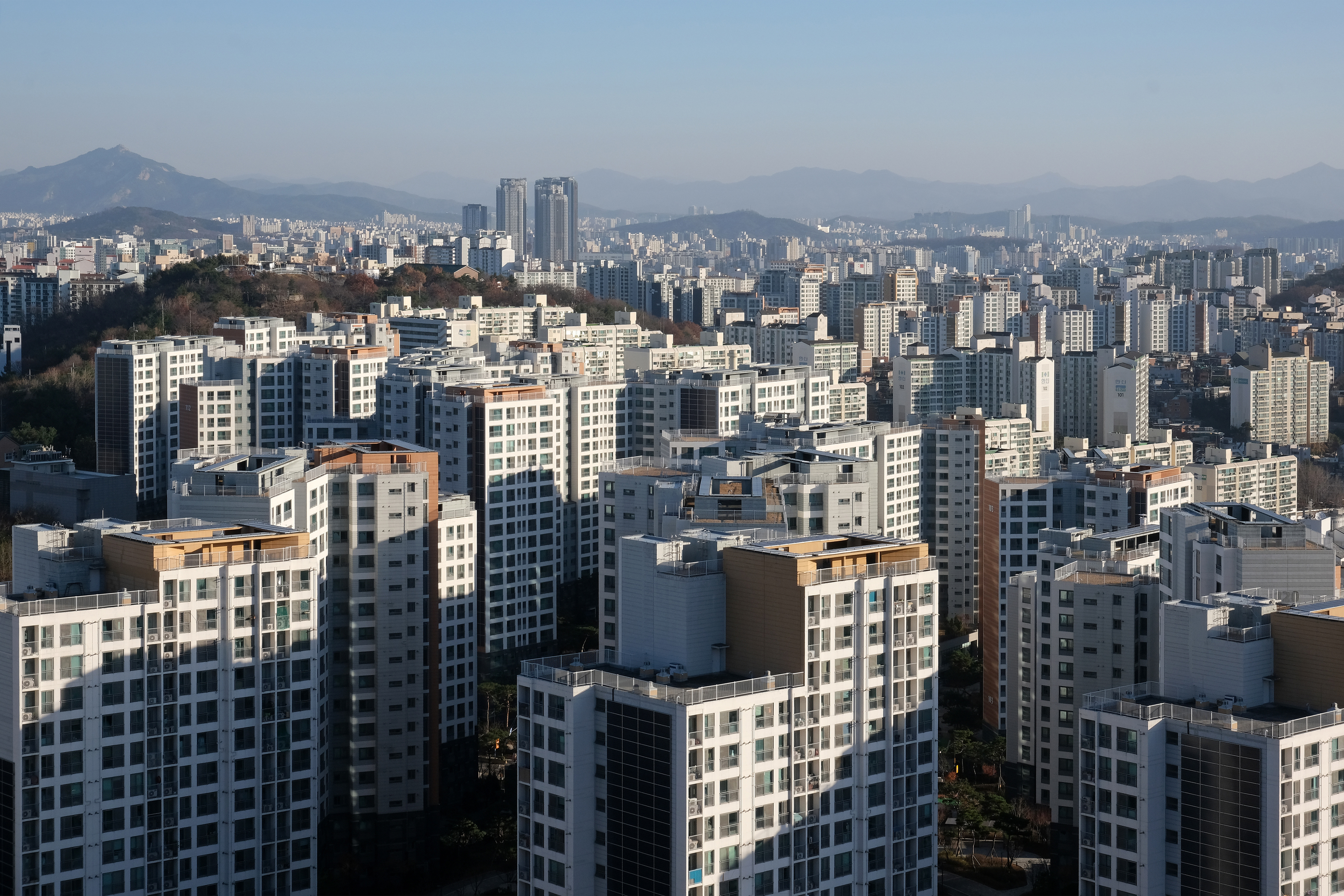
- Seongdong District skyline from Hanyang University Seoul campus Seongsu Bridge Seoul Forest Buildings near the Ttukseom station Eungbongsan View of the district from Maebong mountain

- Flag

- Location of Seongdong District in Seoul
- Coordinates: 37°33′48″N 127°02′13″E
- Country: South Korea
- Region: Sudogwon
- Special City: Seoul
- Administrative dong: 20

Government
  - Body: Seongdong-gu Council
  - Mayor: Yu Bo-hwa (Democratic)
  - MNAs: List of MNAs: Hong Ihk-pyo (Democratic); Park Sung-joon (Democratic)

Area
  - Total: 16.85 km^{2} (6.51 sq mi)

Population (October, 2022, September 2024)
  - Total: 275,403
  - Density: 16,340/km^{2} (42,330/sq mi)
- Time zone: UTC+9 (Korea Standard Time)
- Postal code: 04700 – 04899
- Area code(s): +82-2-2200,400
- Website: Seongdong District official website

Korean name
- Hangul: 성동구
- Hanja: 城東區
- RR: Seongdong-gu
- MR: Sŏngdong-gu

Seongdong District (Korean: 성동구) is one of the 25 districts which make up the city of Seoul, South Korea. It is situated on the north bank of the Han River. It is divided into 20 dong (neighbourhoods). The district is home to Hanyang University, one of the most prestigious universities in South Korea.

== Administrative divisions ==
Administrative divisions

Seongdong District consists of 20 administrative dongs (haengjeong-dong, 행정동)

- Doseon-dong (도선동; 道詵洞)
  - Hongik-dong (홍익동; 弘益洞): legal dong (beopjeong-dong, 법정동)
- Eungbong-dong (응봉동; 鷹峰洞)
- Haengdang-dong (행당동; 杏堂洞) 1~2
- Geumho-dong (금호동; 金湖洞) 1~4
- Majang-dong (마장동; 馬場洞)
- Oksu-dong (옥수동; 玉水洞) 1~2
- Sageun-dong (사근동; 沙斤洞)
- Seongsu 1ga 1 dong (성수1가 1동; 聖水1街 1洞)
- Seongsu 1ga 2 dong (성수1가 2동; 聖水1街 2洞)
- Seongsu 2ga 1-dong (성수2가 1동; 聖水2街 1洞)
- Seongsu 2ga 3-dong (성수2가 3동; 聖水2街 3洞)
- Songjeong-dong (송정동; 松亭洞)
- Yongdap-dong (용답동; 龍踏洞)
- Wangsimni-dong (왕십리동; 往十里洞) 1~2
  - Sangwangsimni-dong (상왕십리동; 上往十里洞): legal dong (beopjeong-dong, 법정동)
  - Hawangsimni-dong (하왕십리동; 下往十里洞): legal dong (beopjeong-dong, 법정동)

== Transportation ==
=== Railways ===
- KORAIL

- Jungang Line

- (Dongdaemun-gu) ← Wangsimni ─ Eungbong ─ Oksu → (Yongsan-gu)

- Bundang Line

- Wangsimni ─ Seoul Forest → (Gangnam-gu)

- Seoul Metro

- Seoul Underground Line 2

- (Jung-gu) ← Sangwangsimni ─ Wangsimni ─ Hanyang University ─ Ttukseom ─ Seongsu → (Gwangjin-gu)

- Seoul Underground Branch for Sinseol-dong of Line 2

- Seongsu ─ Yongdap ─ Sindap → (Dongdaemun-gu)

- Seoul Underground Line 3

- (Jung-gu) ← Geumho ─ Oksu → (Gangnam-gu)

- Seoul Metropolitan Rapid Transit Corporation

- Seoul Underground Line 5

- (Jung-gu) ← Singeumho ─ Haengdang─ Wangsimni ─ Majang → (Dongdaemun-gu)

== History ==
When Seoul was expanding outward on its size, many parts of Gyeonggi Province were merged to Seongdong District. However, due to its extraordinarily huge size, Seoul Metropolitan Government divided the district into 5 (Gangnam District, Gangdong District, Gwangjin District, Seongdong District, and Songpa District), and made Seongdong District cede some part of the district to Jung District. Yeongdeungpo District, Seodaemun District, Seongbuk District, and Dongdaemun District underwent similar changes.

== Education ==
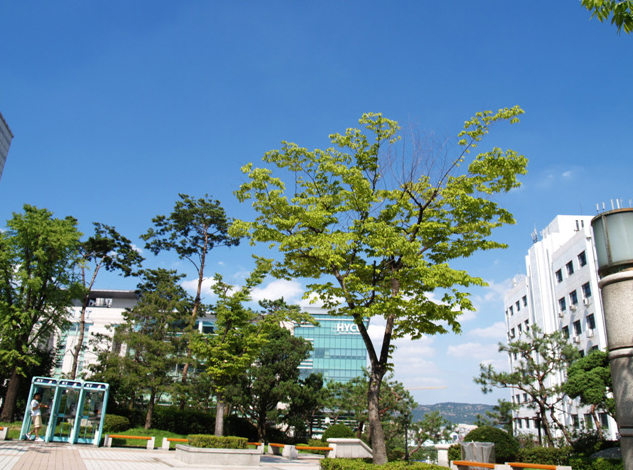
Hanyang University

Hanyang University, a prestigious university in South Korea, is located in Haengdang-dong and Sageun-dong.

== Sister cities ==
- (South Korea) Hampyeong County, South Jeolla Province
- Huairou District, Beijing, China
- (South Korea) Jincheon County, North Chungcheong Province
- (South Korea) Seocheon County, South Chungcheong Province
- Cobb County, Georgia, United States

== Notes ==
1. This is why Gangdong District Office is located in a corner of Gangdong District. The building was previously used as Seongdong District Office.
