= Oksu-dong =

- Location within Seoul Location within South Korea
- Country: South Korea

Area
  - Total: 1.95 km^{2} (0.75 sq mi)

Population (2001)
  - Total: 32,339
  - Density: 16,600/km^{2} (43,000/sq mi)

Korean name
- Hangul: 옥수동
- Hanja: 玉水洞
- RR: Oksu-dong
- MR: Oksu-dong

Oksu-dong (Korean: 옥수동) is a dong (neighbourhood) of Seongdong District, Seoul, South Korea.

== History ==
During the Japanese occupation of Korea, Oksu-dong was a small hamlet known as Doomo-Village (두모리; 豆毛里) belonging to Hanji (한지면; 漢芝面) within Goyang County (고양군 高陽郡) and lying close near Han river.

== See also ==
- Administrative divisions of South Korea
