= Majang-dong =

Neighborhood in Seoul, South Korea

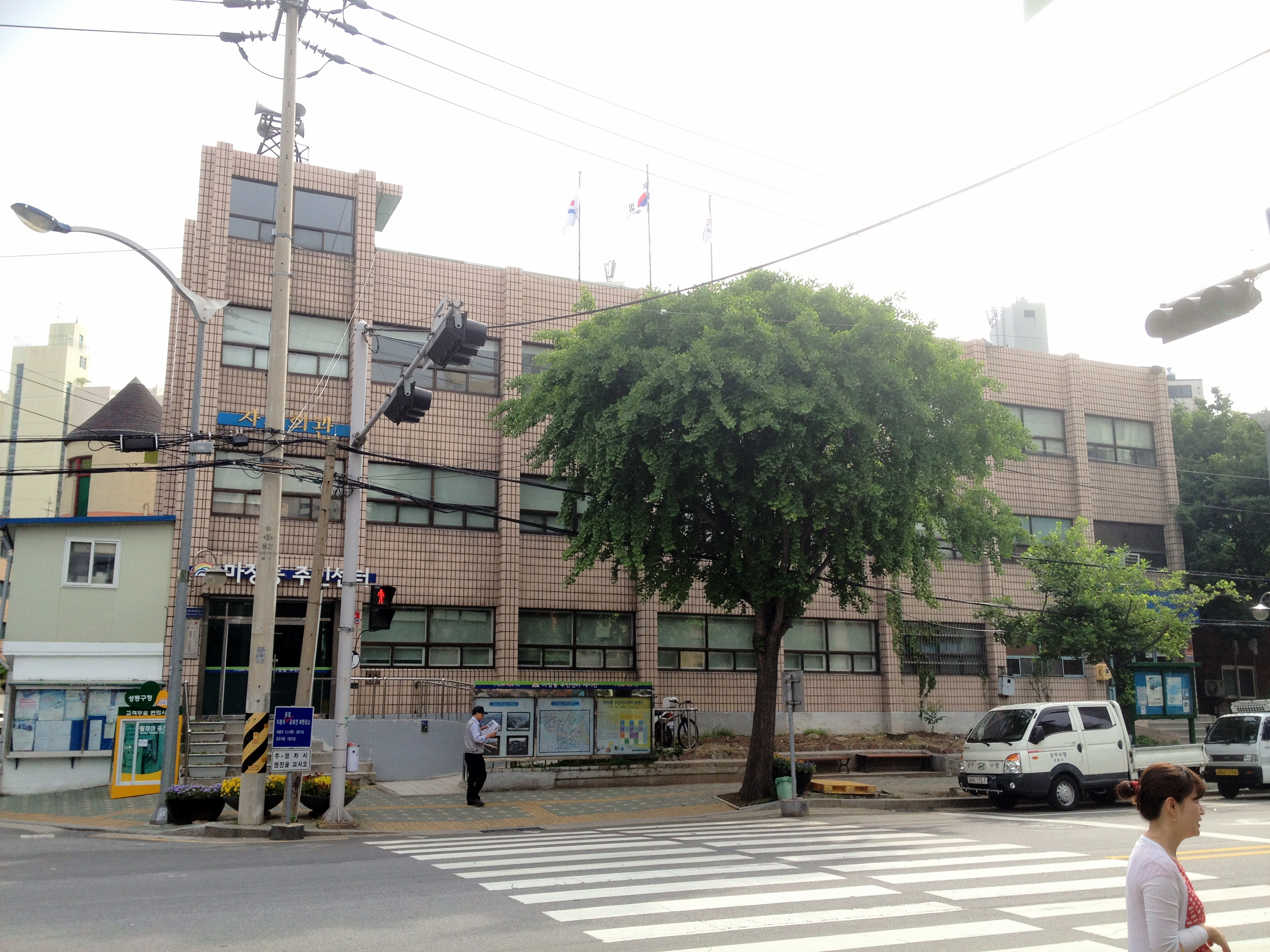
- Majang-dong Food Alley Majang-dong Community Service Center
- Interactive map of Majang-dong
- Coordinates: 37°33′54″N 127°02′23″E
- Country: South Korea

Area
  - Total: 1.05 km^{2} (0.41 sq mi)

Population (2001)
  - Total: 26,118
  - Density: 24,900/km^{2} (64,400/sq mi)

Korean name
- Hangul: 마장동
- Hanja: 馬場洞
- RR: Majang-dong
- MR: Majang-dong

Majang-dong (Korean: 마장동) is a dong (neighbourhood) of Seongdong District, Seoul, South Korea.

== See also ==
- Administrative divisions of South Korea
