= Haengdang-dong =

- Wangsimni Gopchang Street
- Interactive map of Haengdang-dong
- Coordinates: 37.5576°N 127.0362°E
- Country: South Korea

Area
  - Total: 1.01 km^{2} (0.39 sq mi)

Population (2001)
  - Total: 45,284
  - Density: 44,800/km^{2} (116,000/sq mi)

Korean name
- Hangul: 행당동
- Hanja: 杏堂洞
- RR: Haengdang-dong
- MR: Haengdang-dong

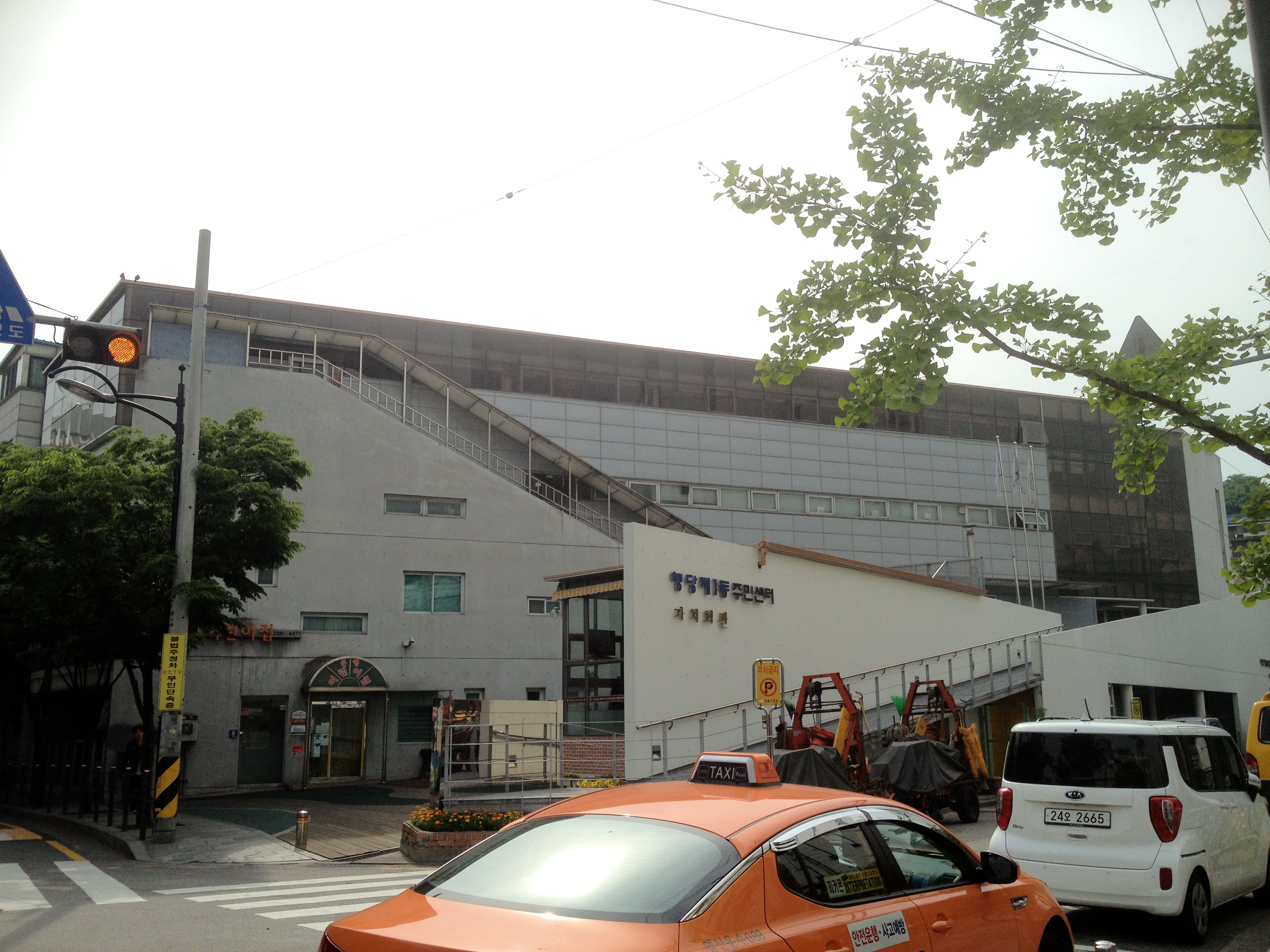
Haengdang 1-dong Community Service Centre

Haengdang-dong (Korean: 행당동) is a dong (neighborhood) of Seongdong District, Seoul, South Korea.

== See also ==
- Administrative divisions of South Korea
