= Children's Grand Park station =

Metro station in Seoul, South Korea

Coordinates: 37°32′52″N 127°04′28″E

어린이대공원 (세종대); Children's Grand Park (Sejong Univ.)
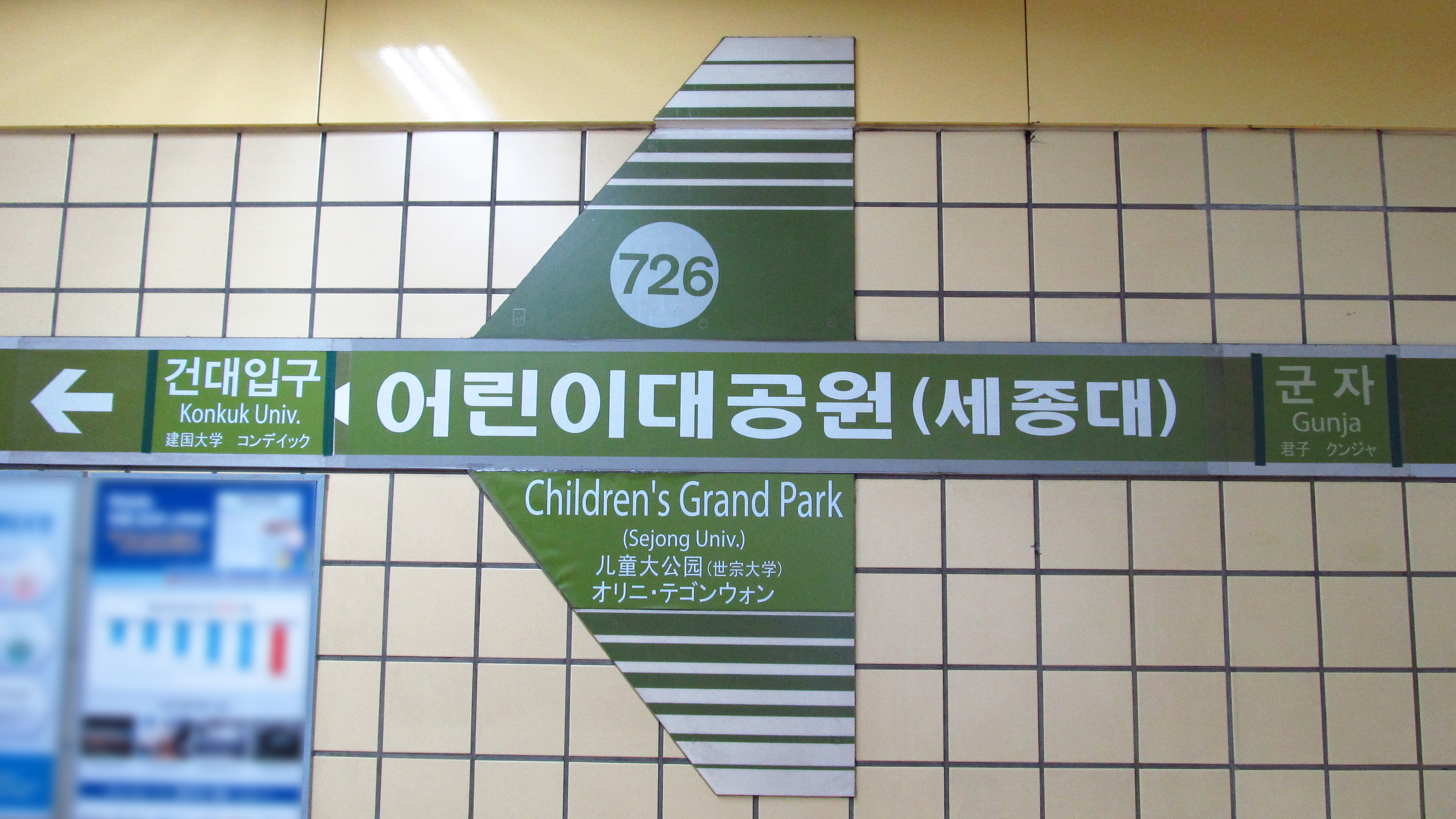
- Station Sign

Korean name
- Hangul: 어린이대공원역
- Hanja: 어린이大公園驛
- Revised Romanization: Eorinidaegongwon-yeok
- McCune–Reischauer: Ŏrinidaegong'wŏn-yŏk

General information
- Location: 3 Hwayang-dong, Gwangjin-gu, Seoul
- Operated by: Seoul Metro
- Line(s): Line 7
- Platforms: 2
- Tracks: 2

Construction
- Structure type: Underground

Key dates
- October 11, 1996: Line 7 opened

Children's Grand Park Station (Korean: 어린이대공원역) is a rapid transit station on Seoul Subway Line 7. It is located in Mojin-dong, Gwangjin District, Seoul, South Korea. It is also adjacent to Children's Grand Park from which it takes its name.

== Station layout ==
Gunja ↑
| N/B
↓ Konkuk University

Southbound	← ● Line 7 toward Seongnam
Northbound	● Line 7 toward Jangam →

The underground platform has side platforms. The station has connections to ten bus lines through its six exits. It services Gunja-dong, Hwayang-dong, Neung-dong and Mojin-Dong. The northern exits of the station are flanked by Sejong University, Children's Grand Park and some small commercial development, while the southern exits open onto mixed commercial and residential development in Hwayang-dong.

== History ==
Children's Grand Park Station was opened on October 11, 1996 as part of the original part of Line 7 which ran from Jangam Station to Konkuk University Station. Line 7 was completed on August 1, 2000.

== Average Daily Ridership ==
Line	Passengers								
Line	2000	2001	2002	2003	2004	2005	2006	2007	2008
7	12840	16728	17342	18055	17896	17126	16218	16348	15911

Preceding station	Seoul Metropolitan Subway	Following station
Gunja towards Jangam	Line 7	Konkuk University towards Seongnam
