= Gwangjin District =

District of Seoul, South Korea

Gwangjin
- Autonomous District
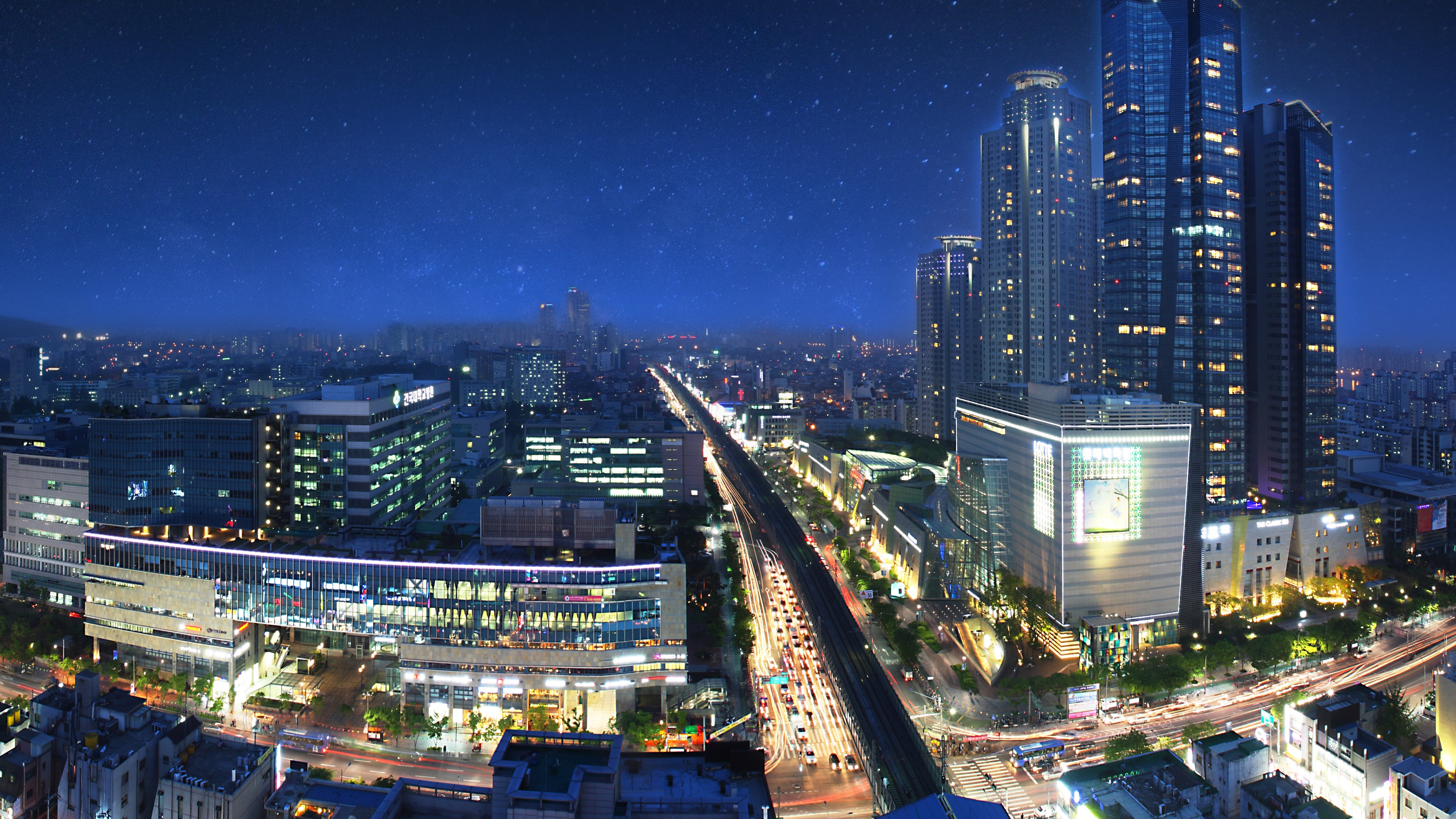
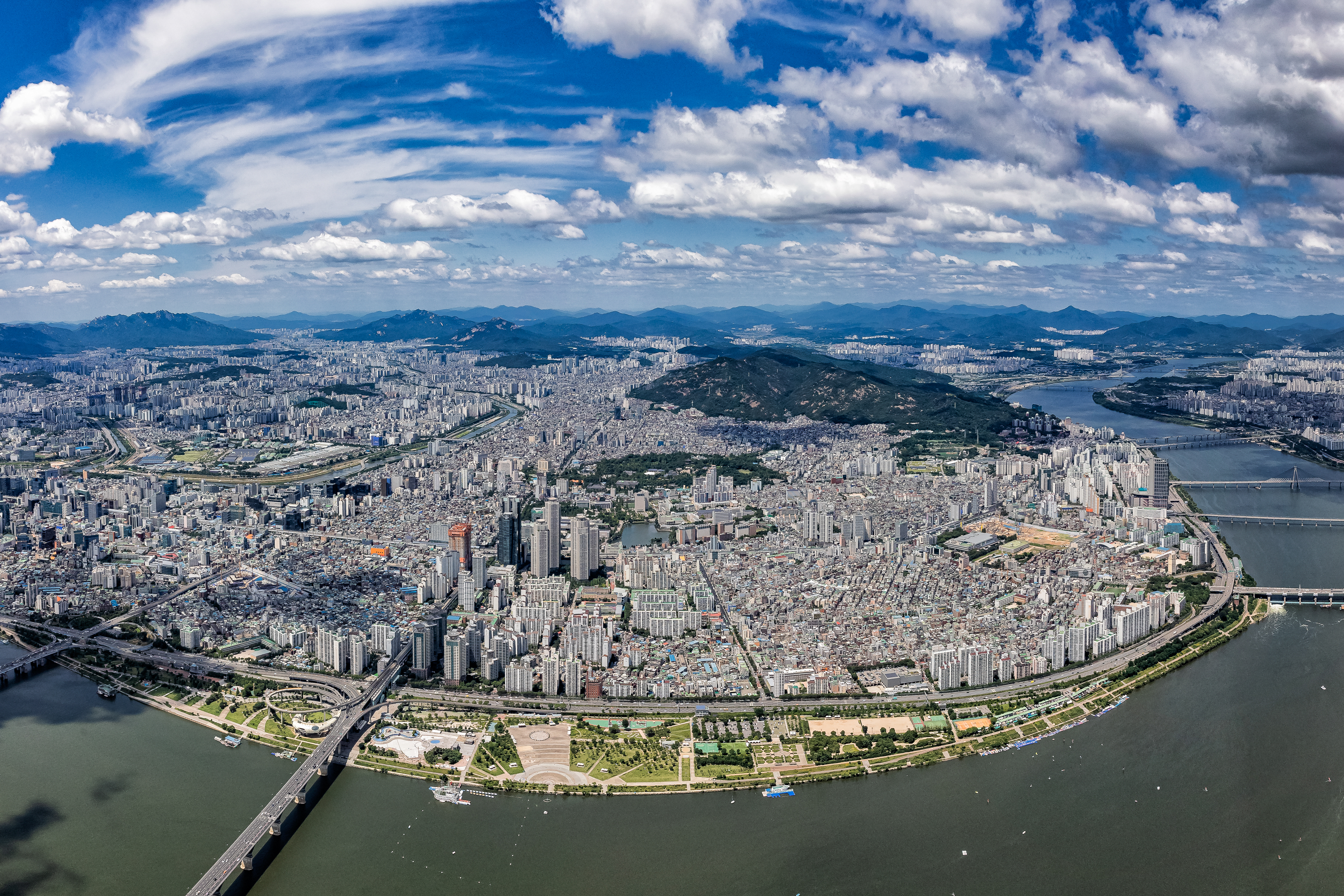
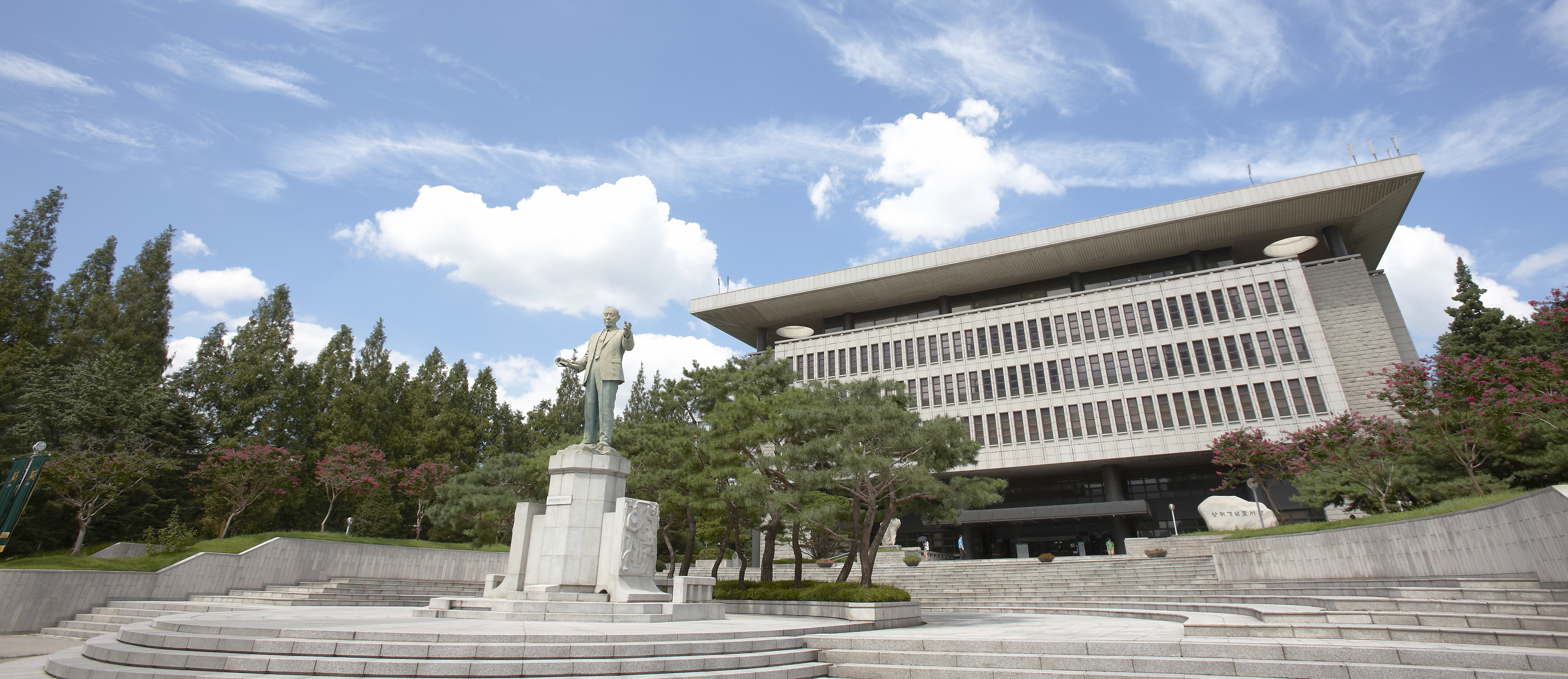
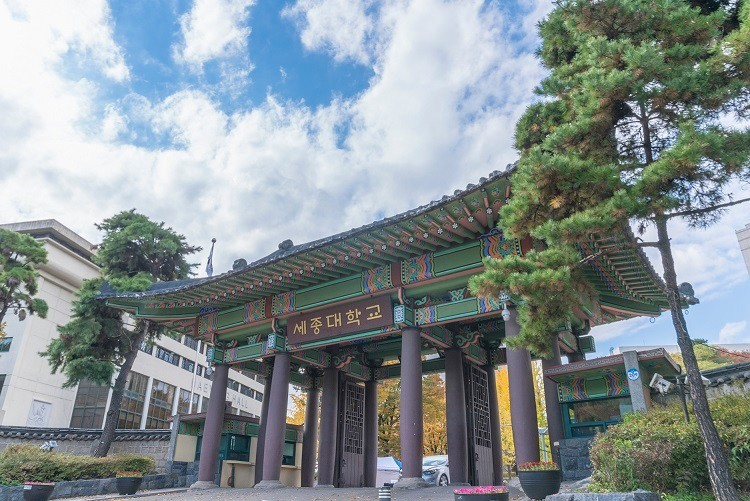
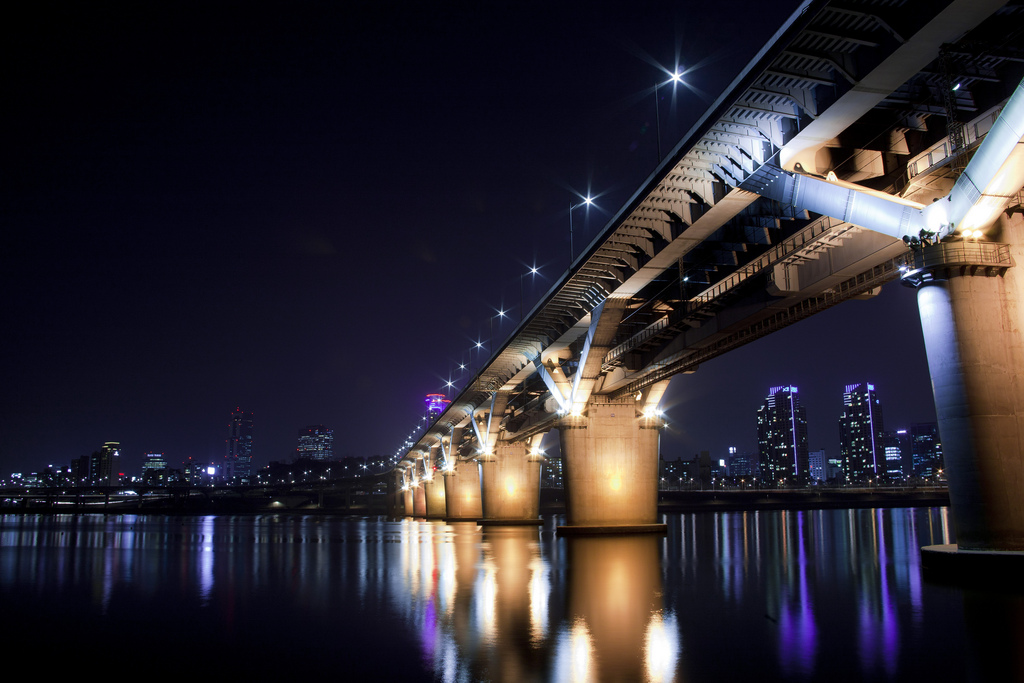
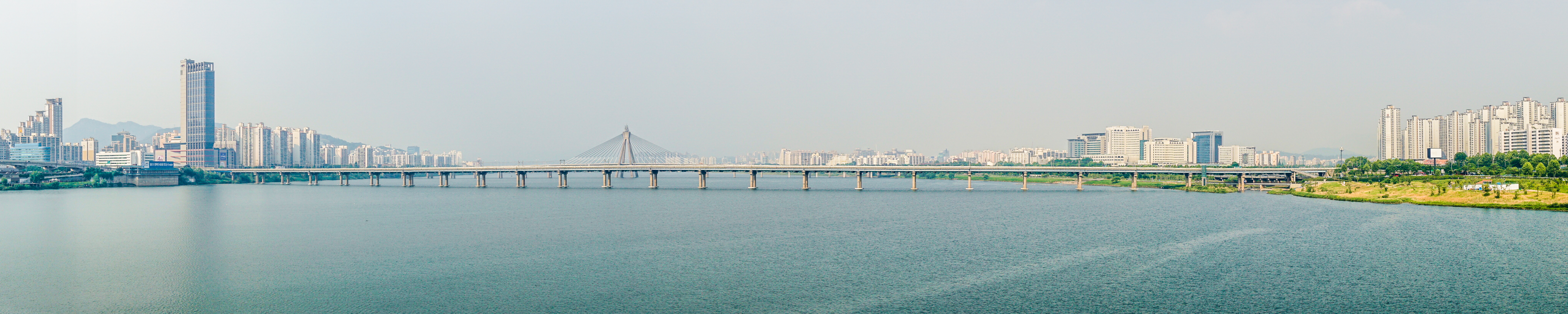
- Star City Aerial view of the district Sangheo Memorial Library Sejong University Cheongdam Bridge at night Han River

- Flag

- Location of Gwangjin District in Seoul
- Interactive map of Gwangjin
- Coordinates: 37.537°N 127.082°E
- Country: South Korea
- Region: Sudogwon
- Special City: Seoul
- Administrative dong: 15

Government
  - Body: Gwangjn-gu Council
  - Mayor: Kim Kyung-ho (People Power)
  - MNAs: List of MNAs: Jun Hye-sook (Independent); Ko Min-jung (Democratic)

Area
  - Total: 23.92 km^{2} (9.24 sq mi)

Population (September 2024)
  - Total: 333,403
  - Density: 13,940/km^{2} (36,100/sq mi)
- Time zone: UTC+9 (Korea Standard Time)
- Postal code..: 04900 ~05199
- Area code(s): +82-2-400~
- Website: Gwangjin District official website

Korean name
- Hangul: 광진구
- Hanja: 廣津區
- RR: Gwangjin-gu
- MR: Kwangjin-gu

Gwangjin District (Korean: 광진구) is one of the 25 districts of Seoul. It is located on the north bank of the Han River on the eastern end of Seoul. The district was split from the neighboring Seongdong District in 1995. Gwangjin District is home to Konkuk University and Sejong University.

== History ==
In 1949, the district was initially part of the administrative area of Goyang-gun. On August 13, 1949, Goyang-gun's Ttukdo-myeon (an administrative district) was incorporated into Seoul, leading to the establishment of the Ttukdo Branch Office in the newly formed city.

By 1950, there was a significant change when the district's naming convention shifted. The term 'ri,' used to describe smaller administrative units, was replaced with 'dong,' a term signifying urban districts, marking the first major administrative change in the region. This was followed by further restructuring, such as the dissolution of the Ttukdo Branch Office in 1964, with its jurisdiction being incorporated directly into the newly-formed Seongdong District.

In 1975, Seongdong District was further divided into two districts: Seongdong District and Gangnam District. At this time, Gwangjin District was still part of Seongdong District. It wasn't until March 25, 1976, that Seongdong District's administrative headquarters was relocated to what is now the Gwangjin District area, which was then called Ttukdo.

In 1977, Gwangjin District's current name was established, after the division of the Gwangjin District from the original Seongdong District. In 1980, additional administrative restructuring took place, as parts of Junggok-dong were split to form the new Junggok 2 and 4 districts. Meanwhile, Songjeong-dong was divided into Songjeong and Gunja-dong districts.

In 1985, Jaryang 1 and 2 were divided into Jaryang 1, 2, and 3. In 1995, Seongdong District was again divided into Gwangjin District and Seongdong District, further consolidating the district's present borders. The area was divided into 16 smaller administrative districts, including several divisions such as Junggok 1-4, Neung-dong, and Gwangjang-dong. The same year, Gwangjin District was formally incorporated as an administrative subdivision of the Seoul Special Metropolitan City.

== Characteristics ==
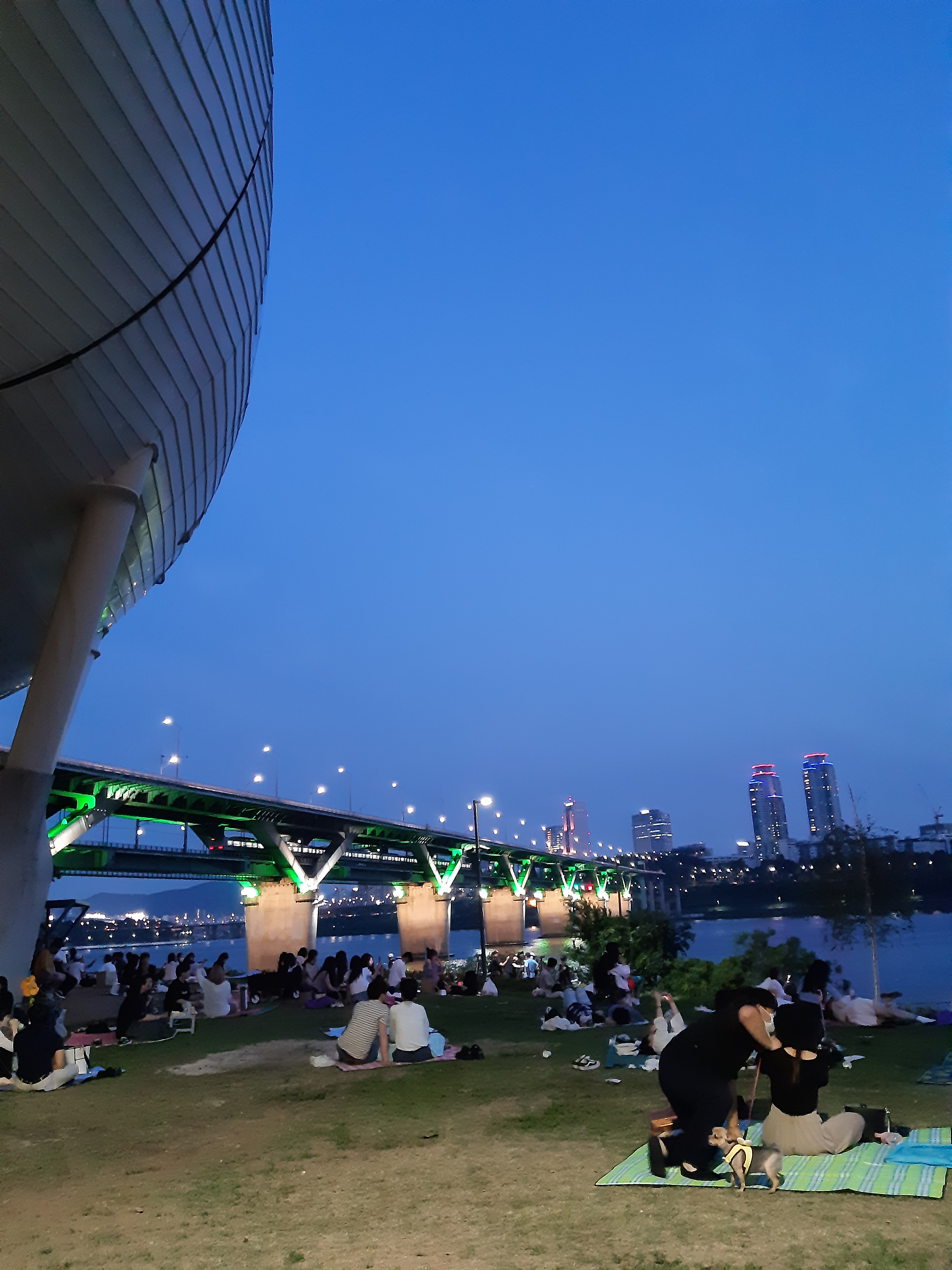
Cheongdam Bridge

Gwangjin District is characterized by a remarkable variety in its composition. It is home to the Konkuk University campus, the vicinity of which is one of Seoul's top nightlife destinations. The south bank overlooking the Han River is a densely packed residential district, where high-rise apartment buildings dominate the skyline, yet the heart and northern end of the district are centers for light industry and manufacturing. The district is also a hub for transportation and mail in and out of Seoul, as the Dong Seoul Bus Terminal and the East-Seoul Postal Service Depot link Seoul with most other major cities in Korea. Most of the remaining area is residential, but consist not of apartment buildings characteristic of the city, but of three or four-story row houses separated by small roads and alleyways.

The Konkuk University area is a popular nightlife district featuring dozens of restaurants, bars, DVD rooms, and pool houses catering to a mostly younger crowd, much like the areas of Sinchon and Hongdae. The area is also a burgeoning shopping district with several boutiques cropping up within the newly designated Rodeo Street and the opening of the Star City mall, which features numerous restaurants and specialty shops.

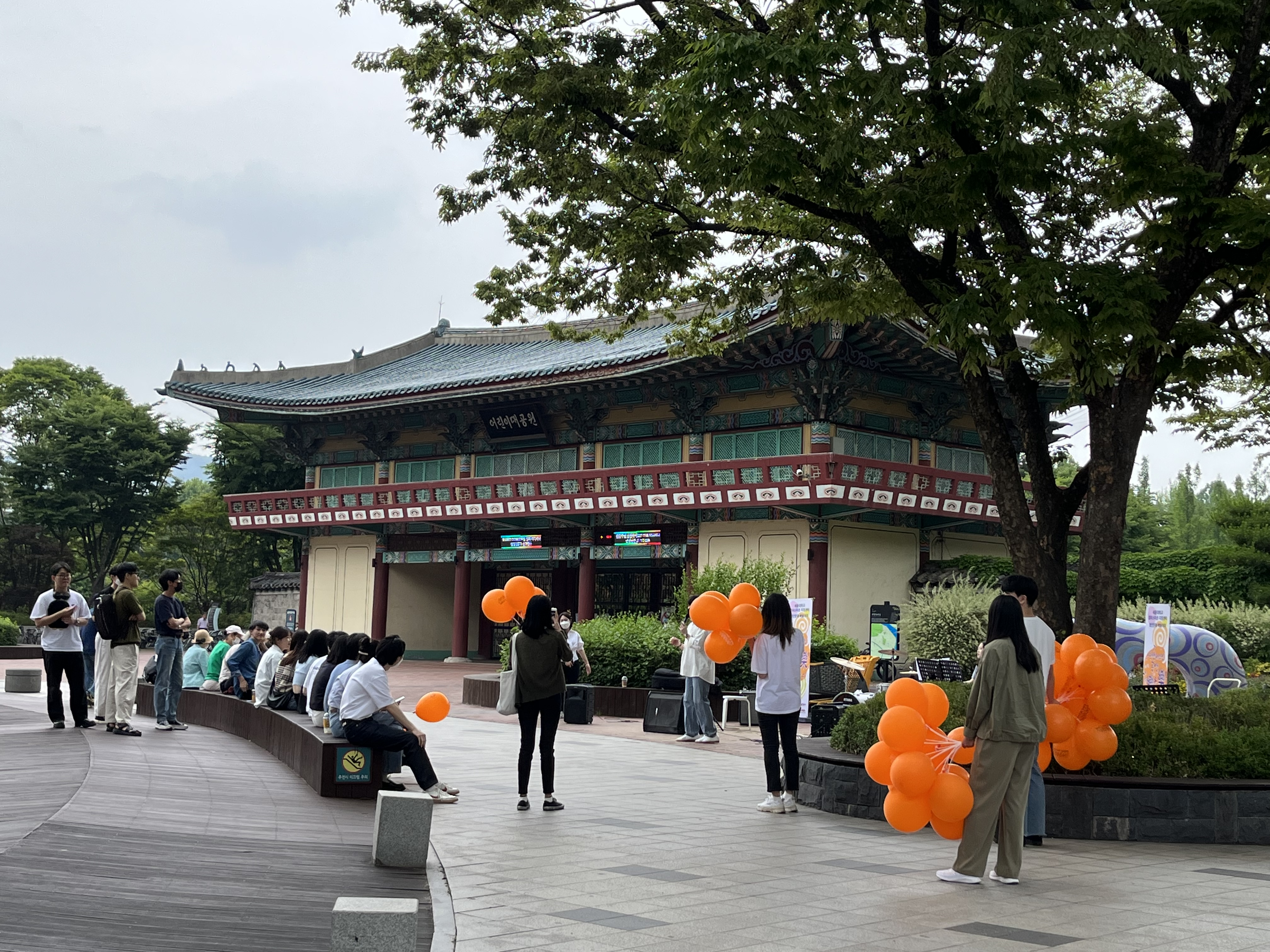
Children's Grand Park

Adjacent to the Sejong University campus is Children's Grand Park, a park complex, which features fountains, walking trails, a zoo, and an amusement park. The area of the park serves as a leisure facility, providing the residents of the area within the vicinity of the complex as well as the students of Sejong University a variety of recreational opportunities.

In the centre of Gwangjin District is Gangbyeon subway station, which serves as one of the many subway connections of the district. On the left of the station is Dong Seoul Bus Terminal, where buses serve various destinations including Busan, Gwangju, Daegu, and Daejeon.

Located in the northeastern section of the district is the Sheraton Grande Walkerhill, managed by the Sheraton Hotels and Resorts and W Seoul Walkerhill Hotel, with one of only three casinos in Seoul.

== Administrative divisions ==
Administrative divisions

Gwangjin District is made up of several neighbourhoods, with a total of 8 dongs forming the administrative network of the district. Due to the geographical landscape of the district, which borders Mountain Acha (Achasan) and the Han River, the territory of Gwangjin was used as an arena for Goguryeo, Baekje, and Silla to compete with each other. Apart from strategic purposes, Achasan is also the setting of a legendary love story which revolves around General Ondal, the son-in-law of King Pyeongwon of Goguryeo, and Princess Pyeonggang.

Gwangnaru and Ttukseom Ferry were key transportation hubs, where people traveled since ancient times. Products and materials from the Korean peninsula were collected and brought there. During the Joseon period, many nobles and scholars settled in the area, reciting lyrical poems and writing books.

=== Divisions ===
- Gunja-dong (군자동; 君子洞)
- Guui-dong (구의동; 九宜洞)
- Hwayang-dong (화양동; 華陽洞)
  - Mojin-dong (모진동; 毛陳洞) - a beopjeong-dong administered by Hwayang-dong
- Jayang-dong (자양동; 紫陽洞)
- Junggok-dong (중곡동; 中谷洞)
- Neung-dong (능동; 陵洞)
- Noyu-dong (노유동; 老遊洞)

== Transportation ==
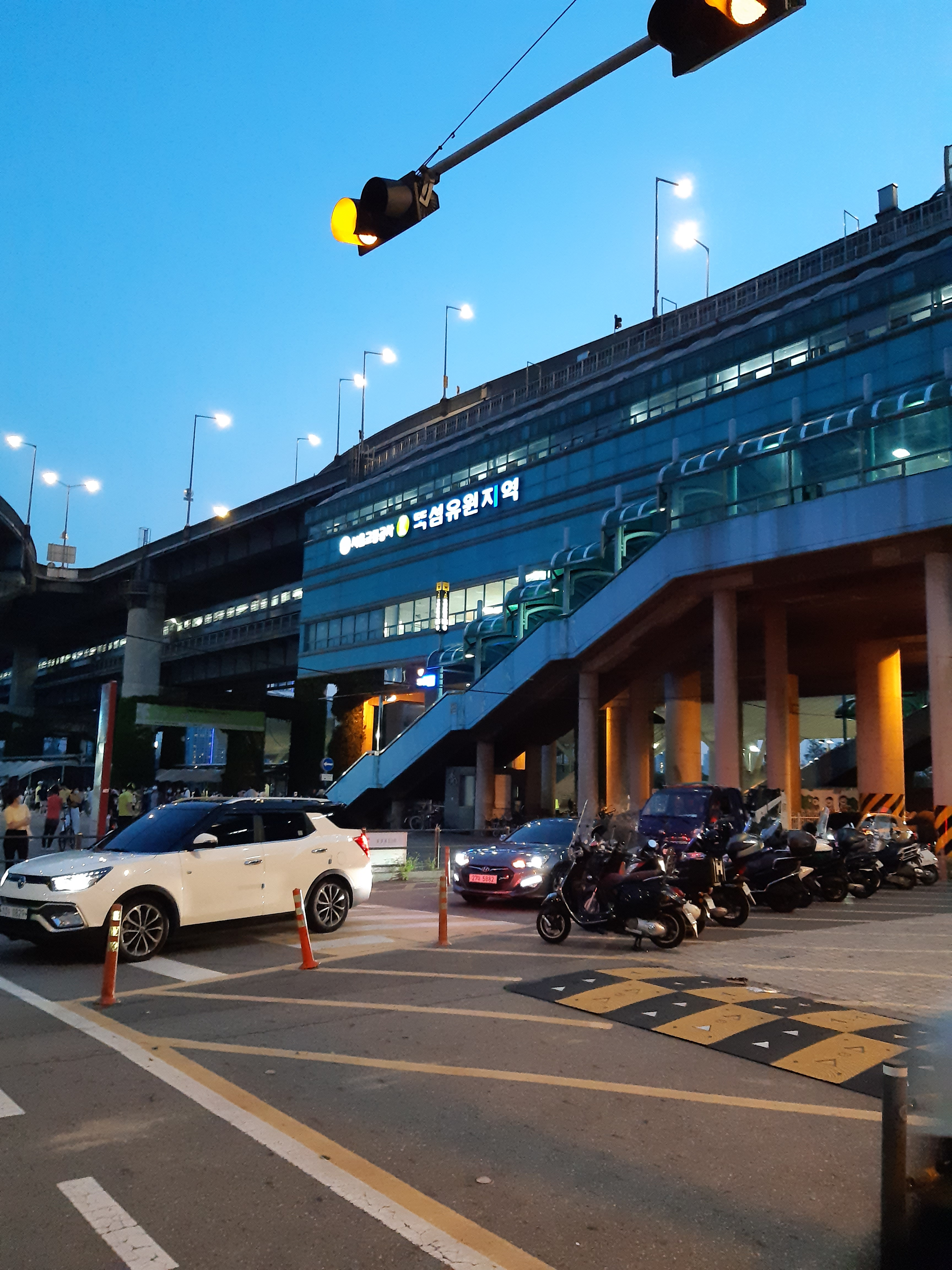
Jayang station

=== Seoul Subway Line 2 ===
Seoul Subway Line 2, also known as the Circle Line, passes through Gwangjin District with key stations, such as Konkuk University, Guui, and Gangbyeon. Other neighbouring areas surrounding the district, such as Seongdong District and Songpa District are accessible through the line.

(Seongdong-gu) ← Konkuk University — Guui — Gangbyeon → (Songpa-gu)

=== Seoul Subway Line 5 ===
Seoul Subway Line 5 runs through Gwangjin District with stops at Gunja, Achasan, and Gwangnaru stations. This line links the district to Dongdaemun District in the west and Gangdong District in the east.

(Dongdaemun-gu) ← Gunja — Achasan — Gwangnaru → (Gangdong-gu)

=== Seoul Subway Line 7 ===
Seoul Subway Line 7 provides additional coverage, with stations such as Junggok, Gunja, Children's Grand Park, Konkuk University, and Jayang. This line connects Gwangjin District to Jungnang District in the north and Gangnam District in the south.

(Jungnang-gu) ← Junggok — Gunja — Children's Grand Park — Konkuk University — Jayang → (Gangnam-gu)

== Education ==
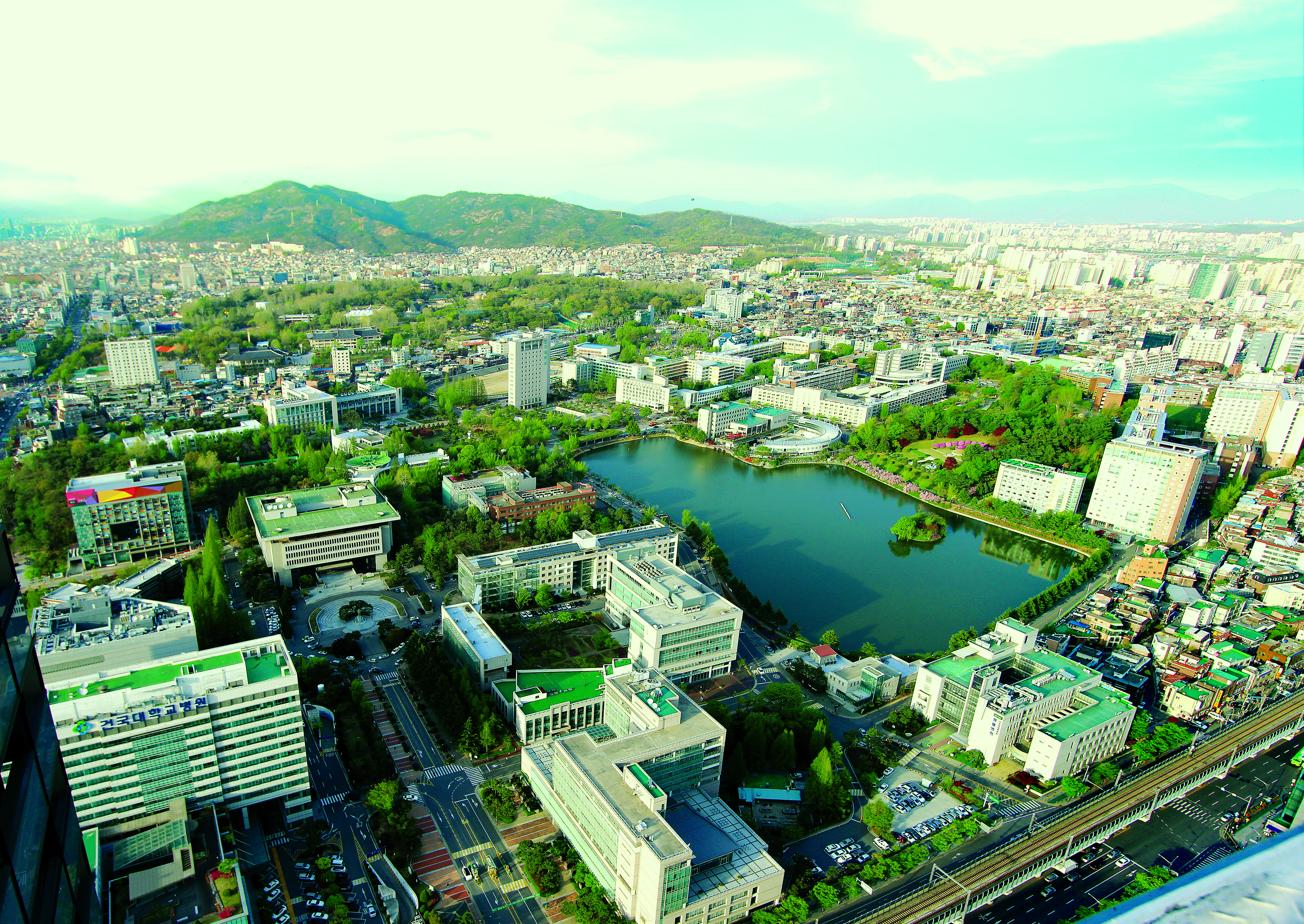
Konkuk University's Seoul Campus

Gwangjin District features a wide variety of educational institutions and international schools, these include the Sejong University Elementary School, which is administered by the Seoul Metropolitan Office of Education, Seoul Gwangwan Middle School, Gwangnam High School, International Mongolia School, and the Korea Kent Foreign School.

Gwangjin District also houses Sejong University, Konkuk University, as well as Sejong Cyber University. Sejong and Konkuk have been regarded as one of the best universities in the country, and stand out in their respective points of interest. Recent ranking released by the Korea JoongAng Daily positioned Konkuk at 10th and Sejong University at 17th best universities in the country.

== Sister cities ==
- Boeun, South Korea
- Boryeong, South Korea
- Ereğli, Turkey
- Fangshan, China
- Inje, South Korea
- Khan Uul, Mongolia
- Mungyeong, South Korea
- Yeonggwang, South Korea
