= Cheongdam Bridge =

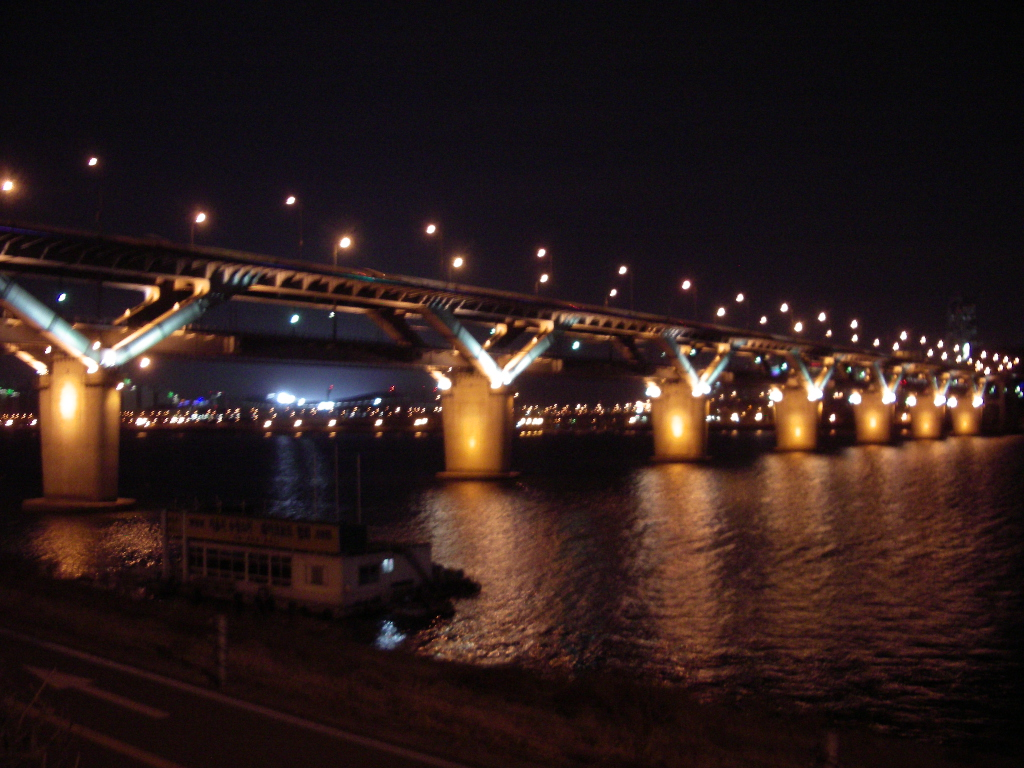
- Coordinates: 37°31′34″N 127°03′51″E
- Carries: Motor traffic, Subway
- Crosses: Han River
- Locale: Seoul, South Korea
- Preceded by: Jamsil Bridge
- Followed by: Yeongdong Bridge

Characteristics
- Design: Steel box girder bridge
- Total length: 1,211 m (3,973 ft)
- Width: 27 m (89 ft)

History
- Engineering design by: Dongbu Engineering
- Constructed by: Dongbu Construction
- Construction start: December 1993
- Construction end: December 23, 1999
- Construction cost: ₩96,300,000,000

Location
- Interactive map of Cheongdam Bridge

- Cheongdam Bridge
- Hangul: 청담대교
- Hanja: 淸潭大橋
- RR: Cheongdam daegyo
- MR: Ch'ŏngdam taegyo

Cheongdam Bridge (Korean: 청담대교) is a bridge over the Han River in Seoul, South Korea. It is the 18th bridge to be constructed over the river. The bridge links the Gwangjin and Gangnam districts. It carries a section of Line 7 of the Seoul Subway, between Cheongdam Station and Jayang station, on its underside, making it the first "duplex bridge" in South Korea. The road portion is a part of the Dongbu Expressway, which limits the bridge to motor traffic only.
