= Gunja station =

Metro station in Seoul, South Korea

Coordinates: 37°33′26″N 127°04′46″E

군자 (능동); Gunja (Neung-dong)
군자 (능동); Gunja (Neung-dong)
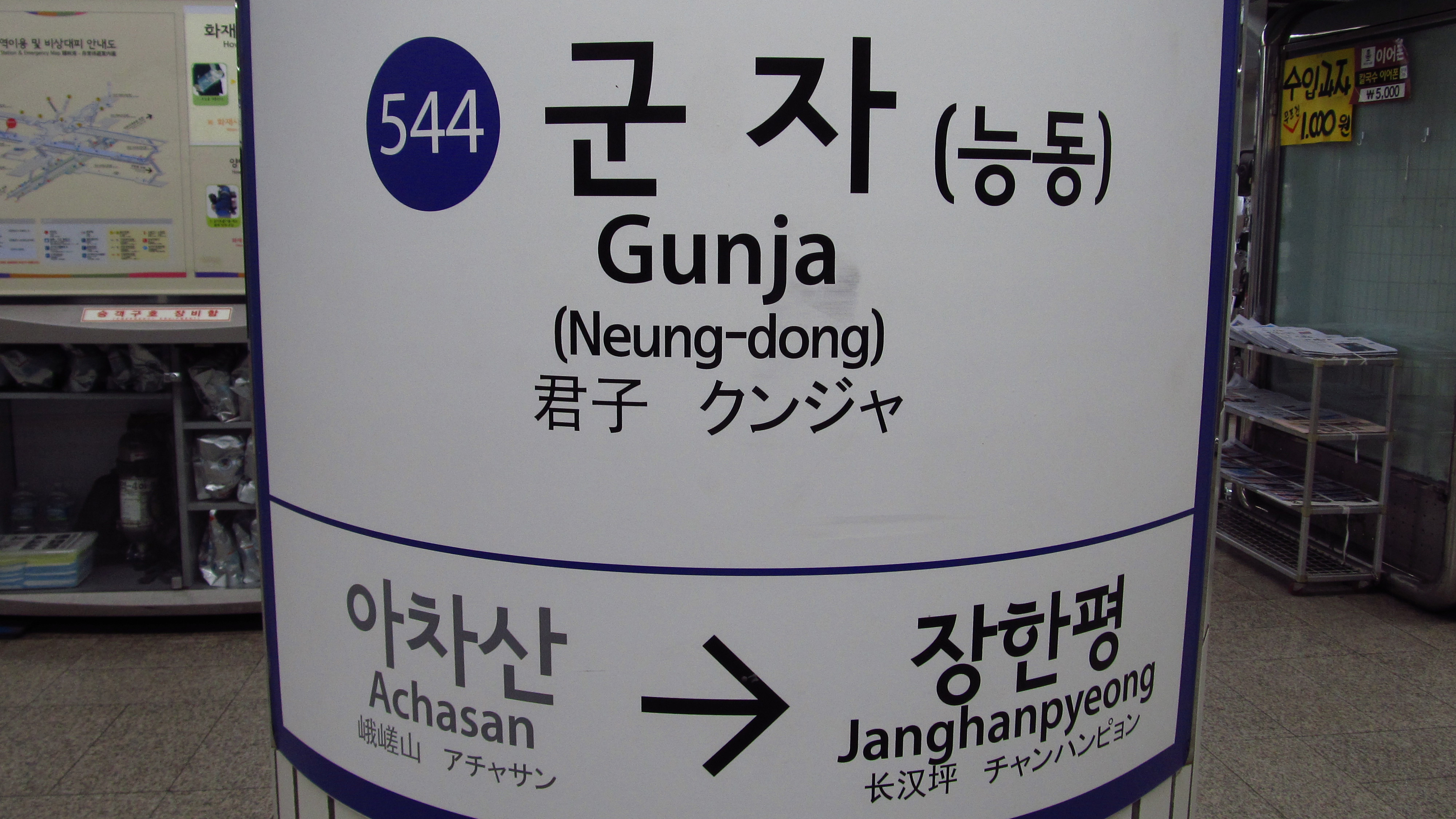
- Station Sign (Line 5)

Korean name
- Hangul: 군자역
- Hanja: 君子驛
- Revised Romanization: Gunja-yeok
- McCune–Reischauer: Kunja-yŏk

General information
- Location: 550 Cheonhodaero Jiha, 275-5 Gunja-dong, Gwangjin-gu, Seoul
- Operator: Seoul Metro
- Lines: Line 5 Line 7
- Platforms: 3
- Tracks: 4

Construction
- Structure type: Underground

History
- Opened: November 15, 1995

Services
Preceding station	Seoul Metropolitan Subway	Following station
Janghanpyeong towards Banghwa	Line 5	Achasan towards Hanam Geomdansan or Macheon
Junggok towards Jangam	Line 7	Children's Grand Park towards Seongnam
Location

Gunja (Neung-dong) Station (Korean: 군자역) is a station on Line 5 and Line 7 of the Seoul Subway in Gwangjin District, Seoul.

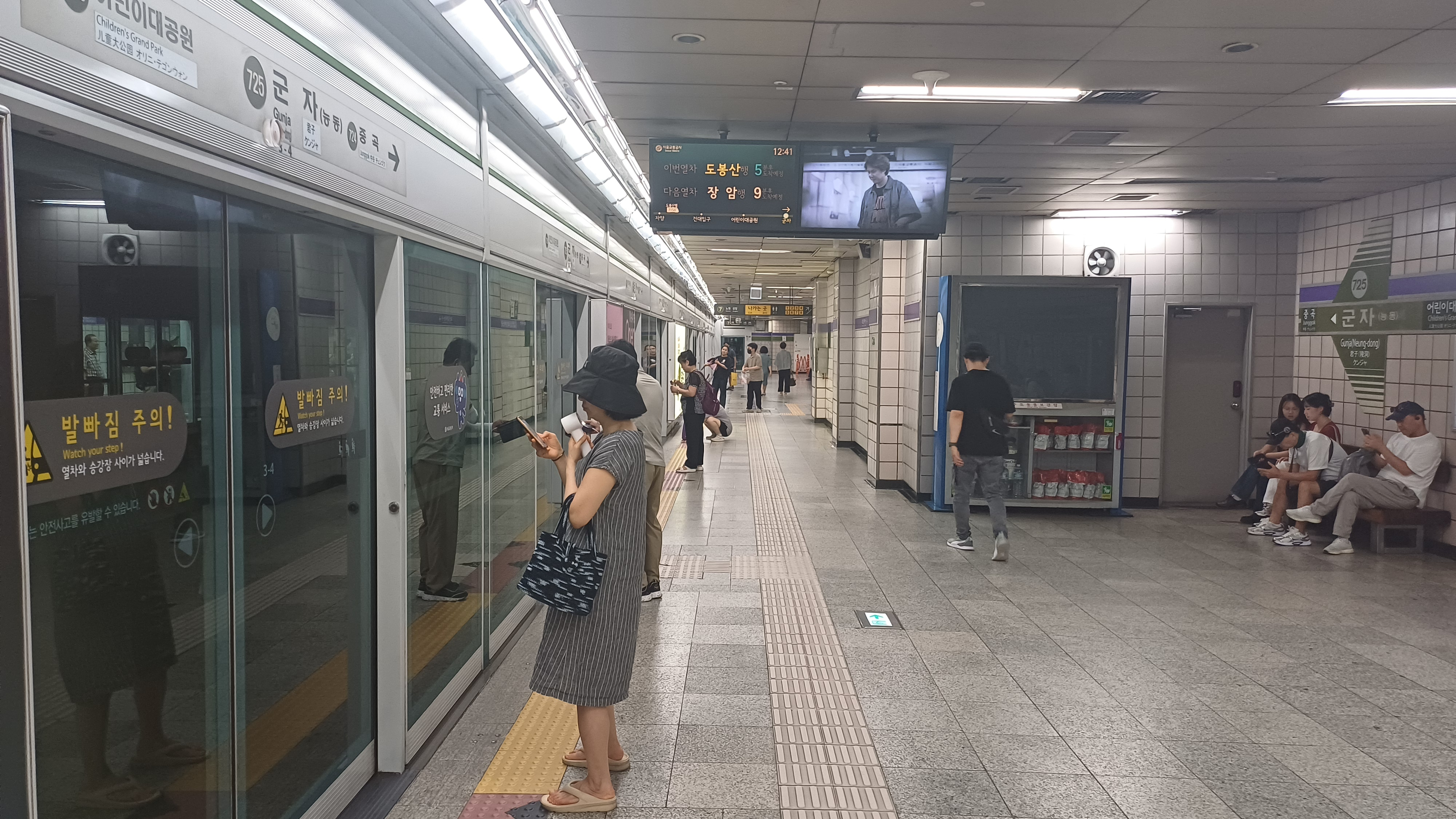
Line 7 platform

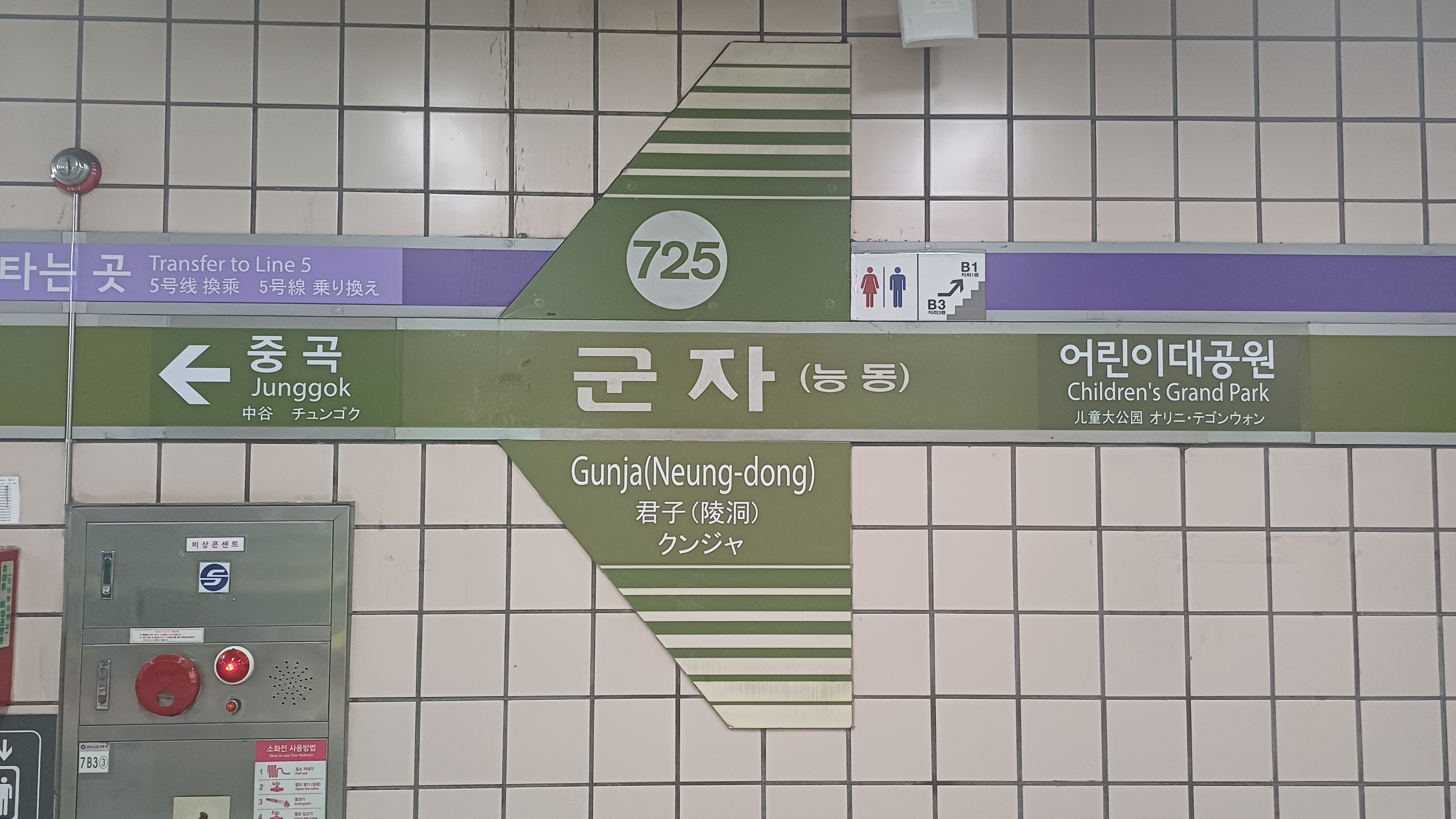
Line 7 station sign

== Station layout ==
=== Line 5 ===
Janghanpyeong ↑
| S/B N/B |
↓ Achasan

Northbound	← ● Line 5 toward Banghwa
Southbound	● Line 5 toward Hanam Geomdansan or Macheon →

=== Line 7 ===
Junggok ↑
S/B | | N/B
↓ Children's Grand Park

Southbound	← ● Line 7 toward Seongnam
Northbound	● Line 7 toward Jangam →
