= Jayang station =

Train station in Seoul, South Korea

Coordinates: 37°31′54″N 127°04′00″E

자양 (뚝섬한강공원); Jayang (Ttukseom Hangang Park)
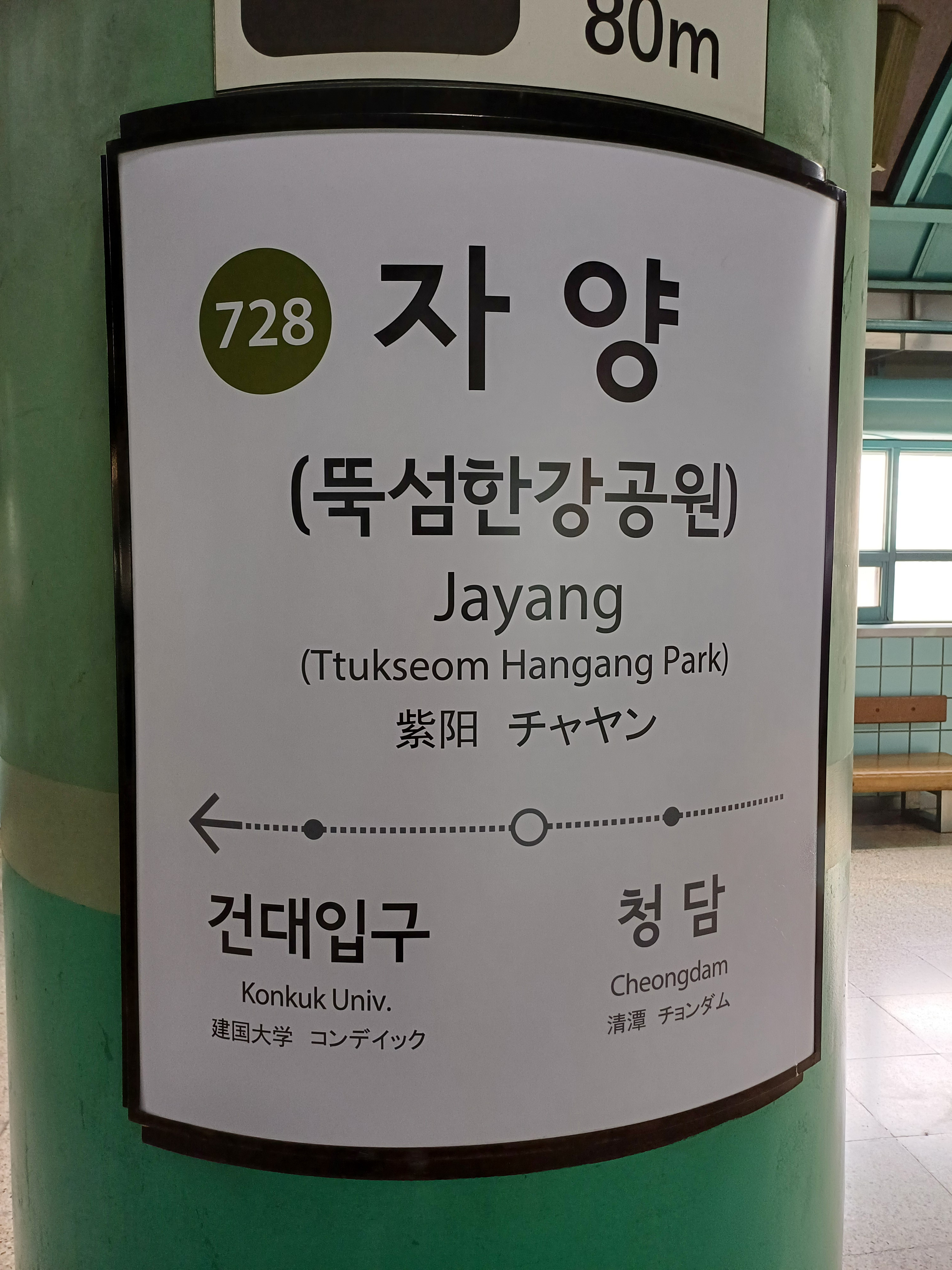
- Station Sign

Korean name
- Hangul: 자양역
- Hanja: 紫陽驛
- RR: Jayang-yeok
- MR: Chayang-yŏk

General information
- Location: 73 Jayang 3-dong, Gwangjin-gu, Seoul
- Operator: Seoul Metro
- Line: Line 7
- Platforms: 2
- Tracks: 2

Construction
- Structure type: Aboveground

History
- Former names: Ttukseom Resort (2000-2019); Ttukseom Park (2019-2024)

Key dates
- August 1, 2000: Line 7 opened
Location

Jayang station (Korean: 자양역) is a metro station on Seoul Subway Line 7. It is located in Jayang-dong in the Gwangjin District administrative district of Seoul. It is the only station in South Korea to be located on the underside of a bridge, beneath Cheongdam Bridge. The station also runs underneath a highway with two exits being south of the highway and two north. The south exits serve Ttukseom Hangang Park, while the north exits serve Jayang 3-dong and Jayang 4-dong which contain some residential towers with small shops and other mixed commercial and residential areas. The station is serviced by a single bus route which is located at exit 4. Before Line 7 opened the station was known as Jayang (자양), the current name of the station.

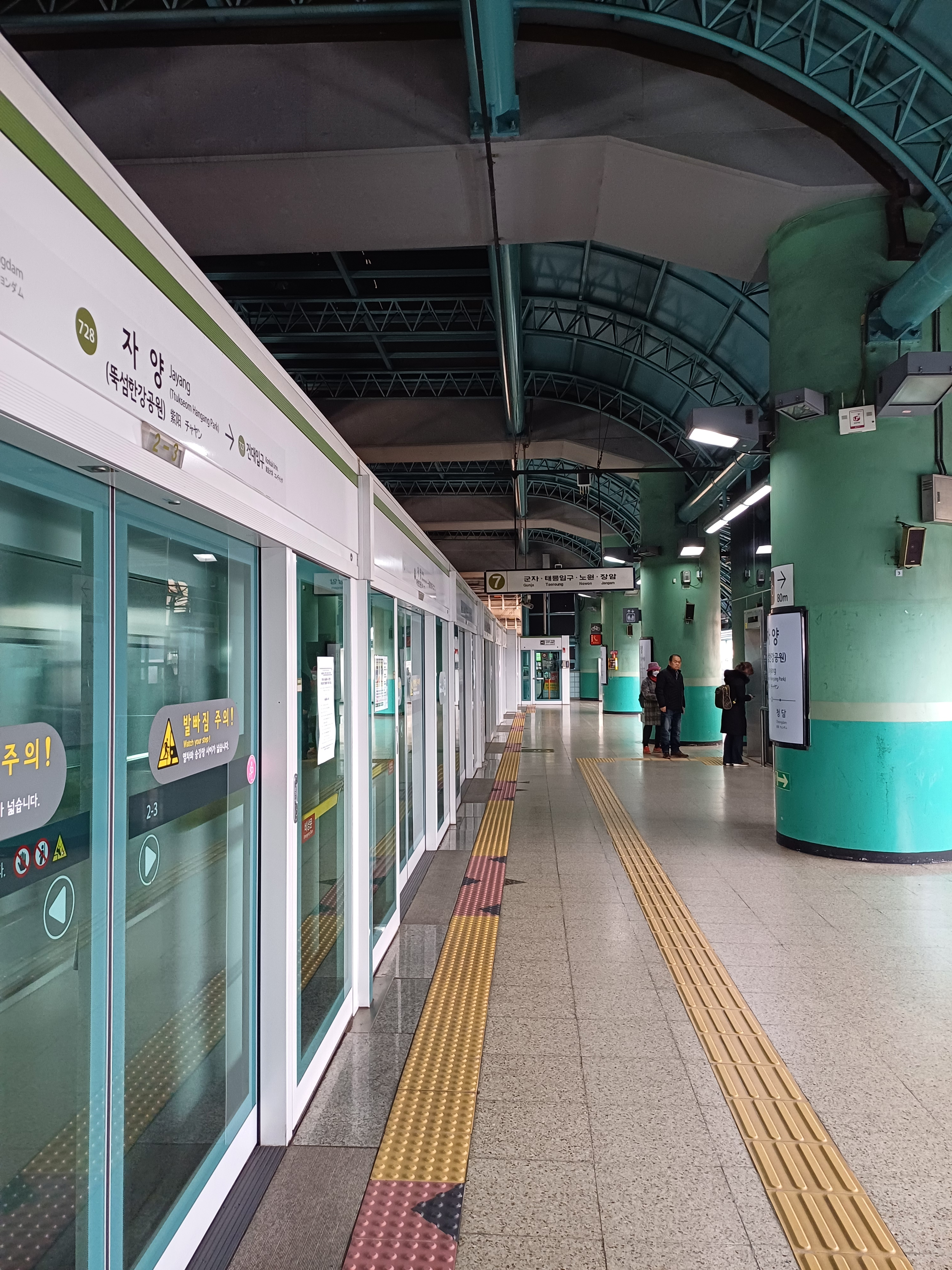
Station platform

== Station layout ==
Konkuk University ↑
S/B | | N/B
↓ Cheongdam

Southbound	← ● Line 7 toward Seongnam
Northbound	● Line 7 toward Jangam →

== History ==
Jayang station was opened on August 1, 2000. It was part of the last section of Line 7 to be completed creating a continuous track from Jangam station to Onsu station.

== Facilities ==
The station is elevated with 2 side platforms. At either end of the station are two exits; however, the station is not continuous. It is interrupted by the highway that runs perpendicular to it. There are elevators at both ends of the station. The south part of the station exits directly into Ttukseom Hangang Park which is a river park which has been open since October 2009. The park features a lit fountain, swimming pool, restaurants, boat rentals, walking paths, climbing wall and bicycle rentals.

In the past, festivals have been held in the area and it has been the home of the Beautiful Flea Market since 2004 which is run by The Beautiful Store.

The north side of the platform allows access to the only bus route serving the station. As well it provides direct access to Noyu-dong. The area immediately around the station is mainly high-rise residential towers with commercial space on the lower floors. While Jayang 4-dong contains primarily low-rise residential and mixed-use development, Jayang 3-dong is mainly high-rise development.

== Average Daily Ridership ==
Line	Passengers								
Line	2000	2001	2002	2003	2004	2005	2006	2007	2008
7	5759	7425	8510	9050	9013	8963	8666	8862	9064

== In popular culture ==
The Station (and the whole line) appeared in the 2025 Netflix animated musical film KPop Demon Hunters during one of the battle scenes between Rumi, Mira & Zoey (the main protagonists of the film) and the Demons. The station and the whole line also appeared in several Korean/American media.

Preceding station	Seoul Metropolitan Subway	Following station
Konkuk University towards Jangam	Line 7	Cheongdam towards Seongnam
