= Children's Grand Park, Seoul =

Family leisure facility in South Korea

Coordinates: 37.546°N 127.08°E

Children's Grand Park
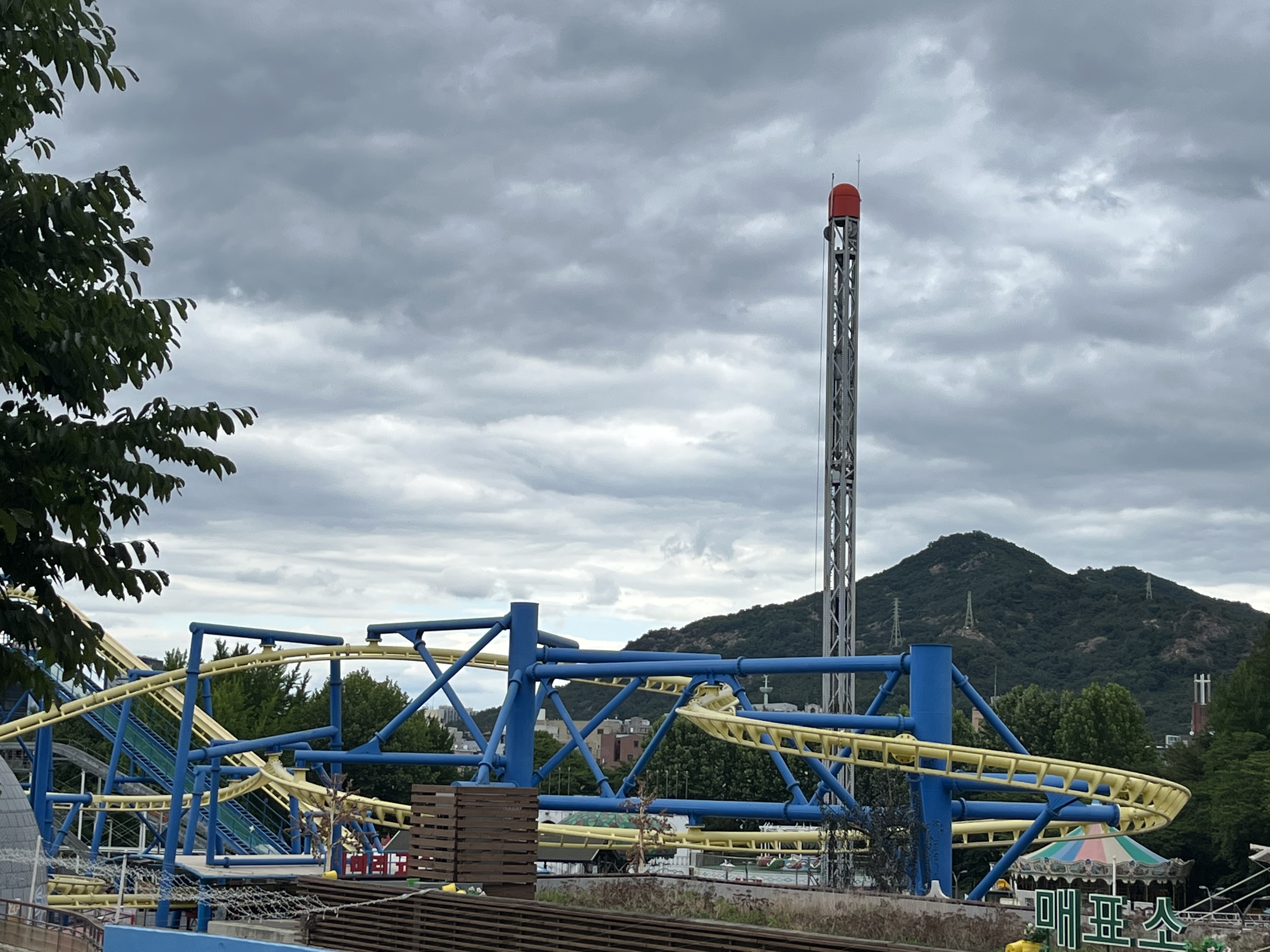
- Interactive map of Children's Grand Park
- Location: Gwangjin District, Seoul, South Korea
- Area: 53 hectares (130 acres)
- Opened: May 1, 1975
- Website: www.sisul.or.kr/open_content/childrenpark/

Korean name
- Hangul: 어린이대공원
- Hanja: 어린이大公園
- RR: Eorini daegongwon
- MR: Ŏrini taegongwŏn

Children's Grand Park (Korean: 어린이대공원) or Seoul Children's Grand Park is a park complex in Gwangjin District, Seoul, South Korea. Facilities at Children's Grand Park include hills and hiking trails, Zoo, garden, and an amusement park. Children's Grand Park is a leisure facility for families, offering a botanical garden, amusement facilities, and diverse performance events. The facility first opened on Children's Day (May 5), 1975.

It has a number of attractions for children, including a Marine Animal House with seals and eurasian otter, a Small Animal Village, and also had a Parrot Village. Nearly 62% of the park's total area of about 530,000 m^{2} (5,700,000 sq ft) consists of trees and grass and various facilities.

== History ==
Seoul Children's Grand Park is an eco-friendly park, because it obtained ISO 14001 certification and was designated as an educational experiencing place by Seoul Metropolitan Office of Education for operating various educational programs for children. Seoul Children's Grand Park was originally the royal tomb for Empress Sunmyeonghyo, who was the Queen of the last King, Sunjong, of the Greater Korean Empire. In 1926, the tomb was moved to Yangju-gun (currently the city Namyangju) in Gyeonggi Province when King Sunjong died. In 1970, by order of President Park Chung Hee, construction of the park started and opened the following year.

On April 20, 2005, six elephants escaped from the Children's Grand Park, causing chaos in the parking lot, shops, and houses, and injuring a 52 years old woman. On March 16, 2009, that incident was also featured on the Discovery Channel's Destroyed in Seconds season 1 episode 31 at the time. Among the South Korean celebrities, Lee Sang-woo and Kwak Do-won, who were late because of this incident, mentioned this story on the air. Inspired by this incident, Kim Tae-won who's the lead guitarist/songwriter of Boohwal, rearranged a part of Ennio Morricone's work, Gabriel's Oboe, and created the second half and releasing the song 4.1.9 The Elephant Escapes (4.1.9 코끼리 탈출하다) on July 5, 2005.

On February 12, 2015, an accident occurred in which a zookeeper was bitten and killed by two lions at the zoo's Ferocious-Animal Village during the day.

In April 2021, the park reopened to the public following eight months of renovation. The park now features 14 rides including a roller coaster, a Viking ship ride, a merry-go-round and bumper cars. The zoo is inhabited by 90 animal species and provides several educational programs that promote the importance of nature and wildlife conservation.

At 2:50 March 23, 2023, a Plains zebra named Sero (세로; lit. 'Vertical') escaped from the Children's Grand Park and he roamed through residential areas and city streets.

== Service hours ==
Between 5 a.m. – 10 p.m. (05:00 – 22:00)

Opening time of the main entrance, rear gate, Guuimun, and Neungdongmun (05:00 – 22:00)

The zoo is open from 9 a.m. – 5 p.m. (It is subject to change depending on season and weather.)

== Fees ==
Entrance is free, but fees for facilities such as the zoo and amusement park vary according to facility.

- Free admission of park entrance
- Fee charged or the use of Park Facilities

=== Animal show ===
Division	Adult	Teenager	Child
Individual	6,500 won	5,000 won	5,000 won
Group	5,800 won	4,500 won	4,500 won

=== Operation ===
- Year-round

=== Time ===
- April ~ October → 11:30 – 17:00 on weekdays (every hour) / 11:30 – 18:00 on weekends (every hour)
- November ~ March → 11:30 – 16:00 on weekdays (every hour) / 11:30 – 17:00 on weekends (every hour)

==== Note (contact info.) ====
- For senior citizen and patriot/veteran: Fee for child.
- The handicapped (including group) 5,000 won for adult / 4,000 won for teenager and child.
- Event time is subject to change.
- Admission fee for adults older than 19 year-old

=== Fee for the use of park facilities ===
Division	Basis	Fee
Grass field	Once for 2 hours	Soccer Event - 156,000 won Weekdays - 25,000 won
Futsal Stadium	Once for 2 hours	5:05- Saturdays, Sundays, and holidays : 32,500 won 3:03 - Weekdays 15,000 won: Saturdays, Sundays, and holidays -19,500 won
Tennis court	Once and one side for 2 hours	Indoor - 25,000 won Outdoor - 8,000 won
Outdoor stage (Stage of Neugdong Forest/ Open stage)	Once for 2 hours Separate charge for electricity	Day Time- 100,000 won (25,000 won for every extra hour) Night Time - 200,000 won (50,000 won for every extra hour)
Filming and Shooting	Once for hour	13,000 won (6,500 won for every extra 1 hour) Fee is charged for filming and shooting with profit making purpose (movie, TV drama, commercial advertisement, etc.).
Parking Lot	Once for every 5 minutes	Compact Car - 150 won Mid-size Car - 200 won Full-sized Car- 450 won
Stroller Rental	Once	3,000 won

== Facilities ==
Division	No.	Area	Note
Infrastructure - Road	-	51, 260.24m^{2}	Road (22 routes for 5.597 km [3.478 mi]), hiking trail (26 routes for 2.662 km [1.654 mi])
Infrastructure - Square	5	12,670.36m^{2}	Square (5)
Landscape facility	11	17,445.39 m^{2}	Pond and ecology facility (3), fountain (2), themed garden (4), streamlet (1), flowerbed
Recreation facility	3	619.84m^{2}	Pavilion (3) long benches (455 benches)
Entertainment facility	3	29,912.66m^{2}	Amusement park (1), children's playground (2)
Sports Facility	8	16,657.00m^{2}	Soccer field (1), health square (4), tennis court (1 (3-sided)), futsal field (1 (2-sided)), gate ball field (1)
Cultural facility	49	59,777.43m^{2}	Restaurant and convenience store (3), restroom (13), information center (1), octagonal hall (1), parking lot (3), kiosk (2), other convenient facility (drinking fountain, public phone, chair)
Convenience facility	24	2,029.20 m^{2}	Restaurant and convenience store (3), restroom (13), information center (1), octagonal hall (1), parking lot (3), kiosk (2), other convenient facility (drinking fountain, public phone, chair)
Management facility	24	2,029.20 m^{2}	Main entrance (1), rear gate (1), Guuimun (1), Neungdongmun (1), substation (1), storage for facility maintenance (1), Office of Tree Management (1), water treatment facility (1), Music Fountain Control Center (1), Train Hill (1), other convenient facility (fence, information sign, street light, high voltage transformer room)
Greenbelt	-	323,259.17m^{2}	Greenbelt, forest belt, grass
Total	-	536,088.50m^{2}	

== Parking facilities ==
- Main entrance parking lot: 153 parking spaces
- Rear entrance parking lot: 252 parking spaces
- Guuimun entrance parking lot: 315 parking spaces

== Location ==
Address: 216, Neungdong-ro, Gwangjin-gu, Seoul, South Korea (Neung-dong)

== Public transportation ==
- Achasan station
- Children's Grand Park station
- Bus: 130, 302, 303, 320, 370, 721, 2221, 2311, 3216, 4212, 9403, 3500, 9301, 119

== Cultural references ==
- Two Mules (1975)
- Destroyed in Seconds - Elephants Go Berserk (2009)

== Gallery ==
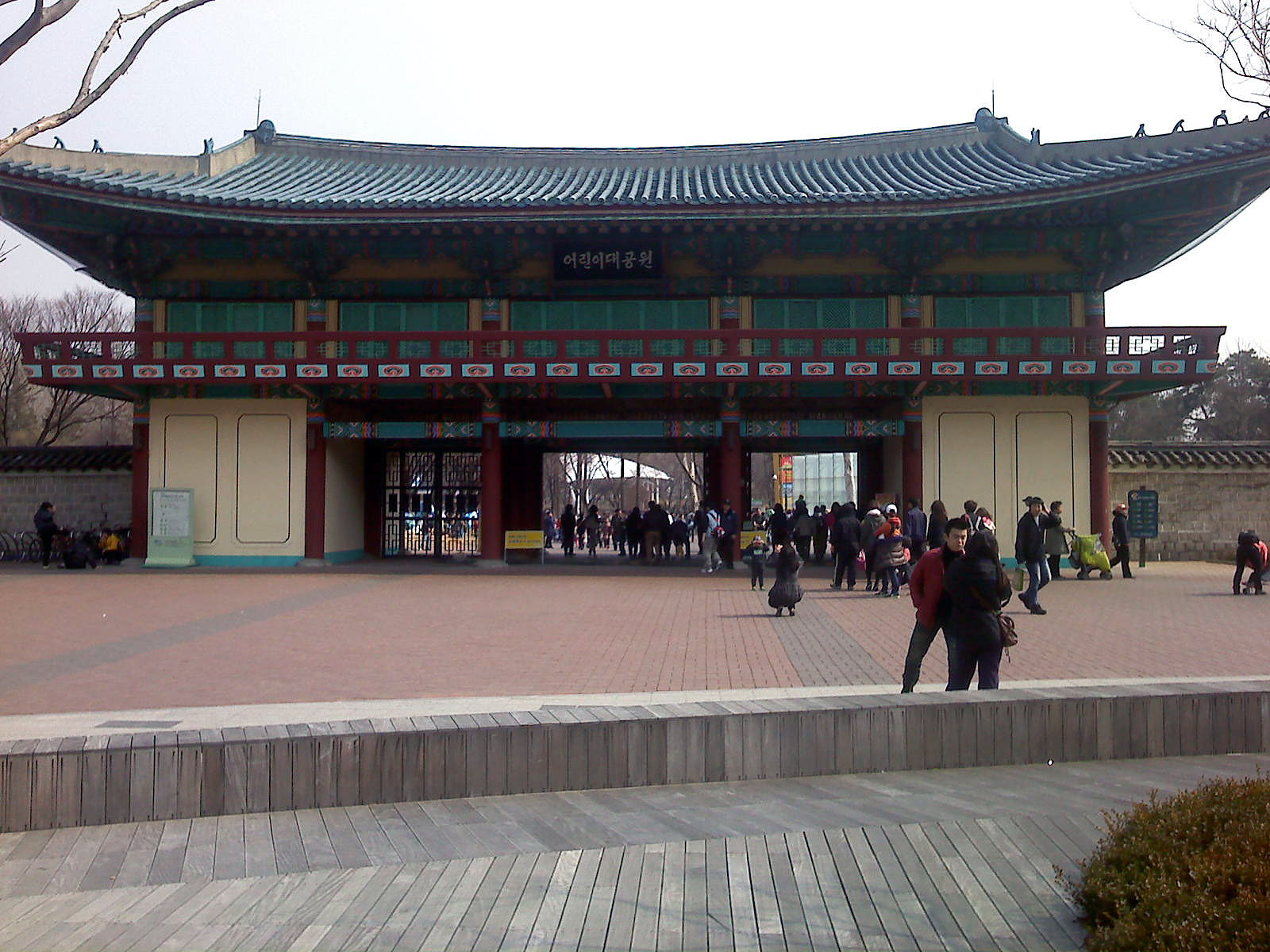
Main Gate

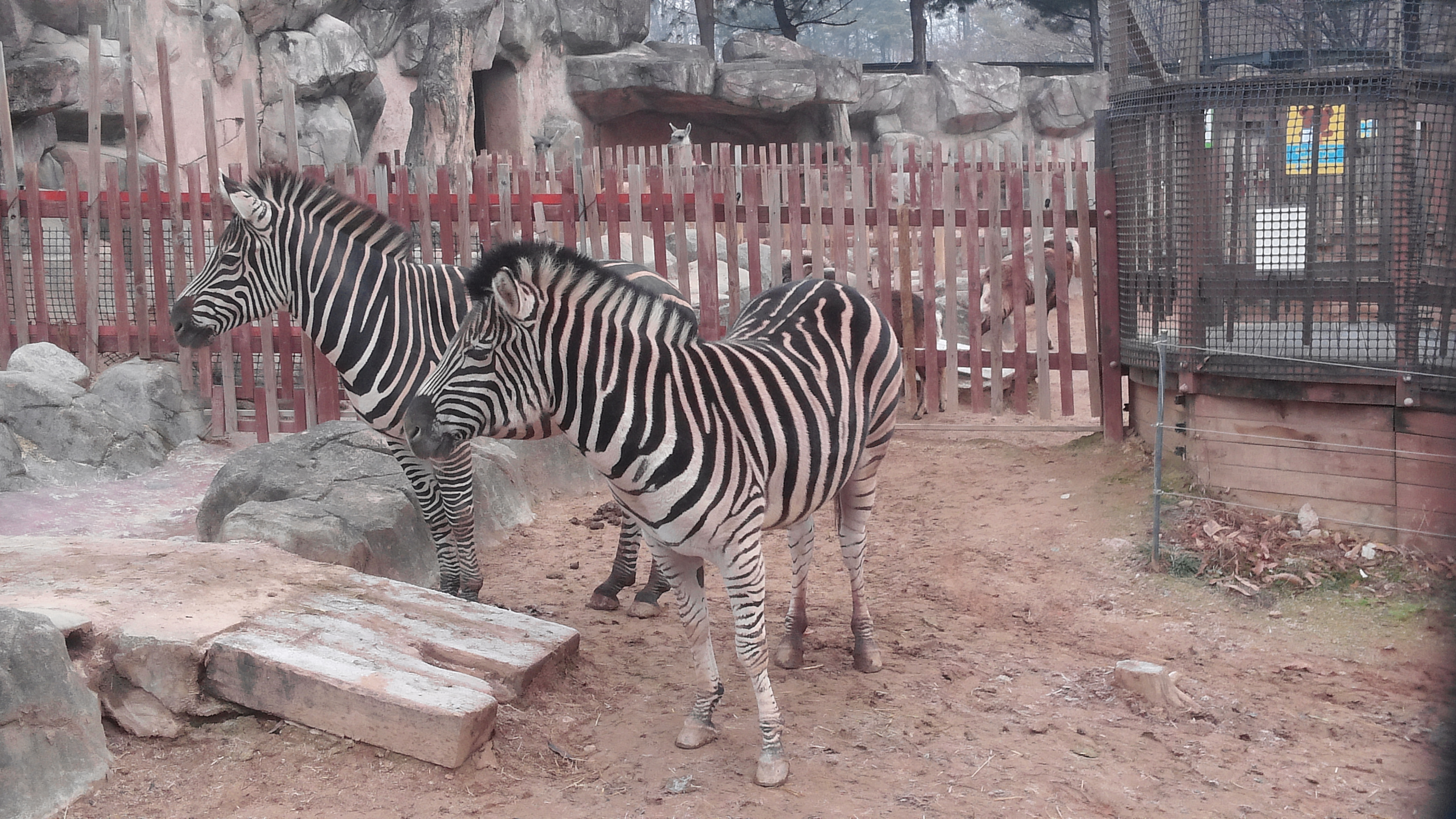
A pair of plains zebras on the 24 December 2015

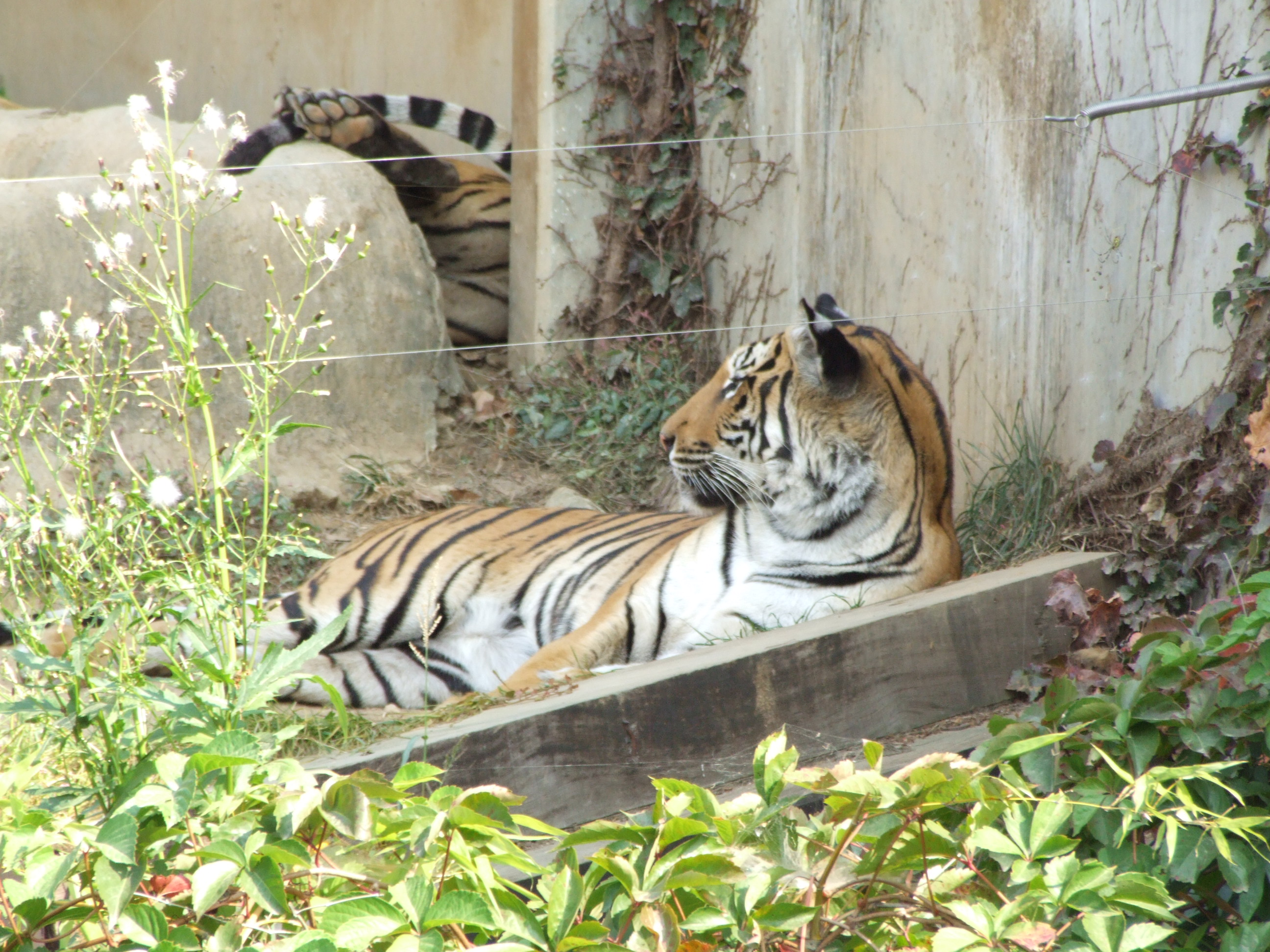
Tigers in the zoo

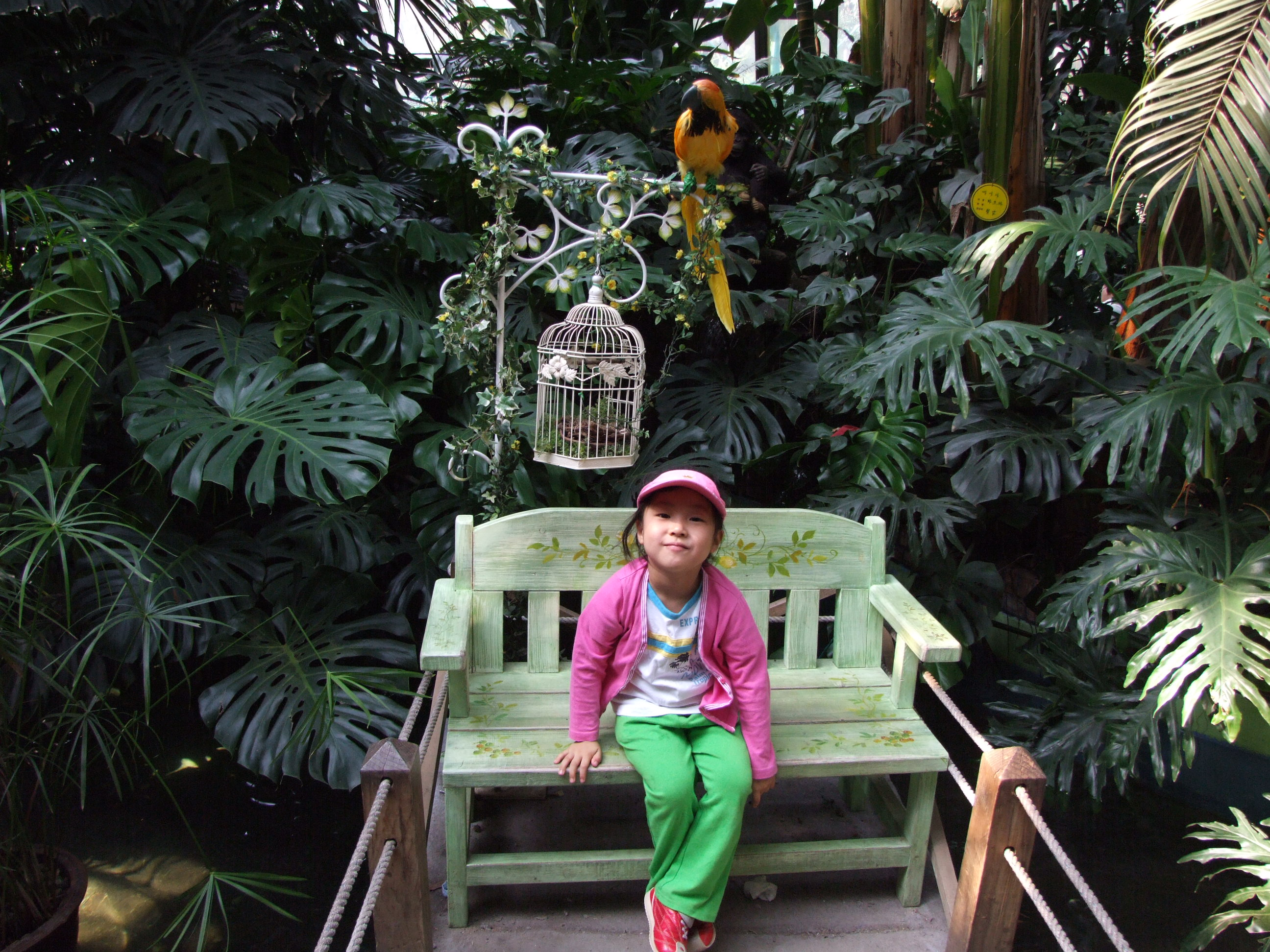
Botanical garden

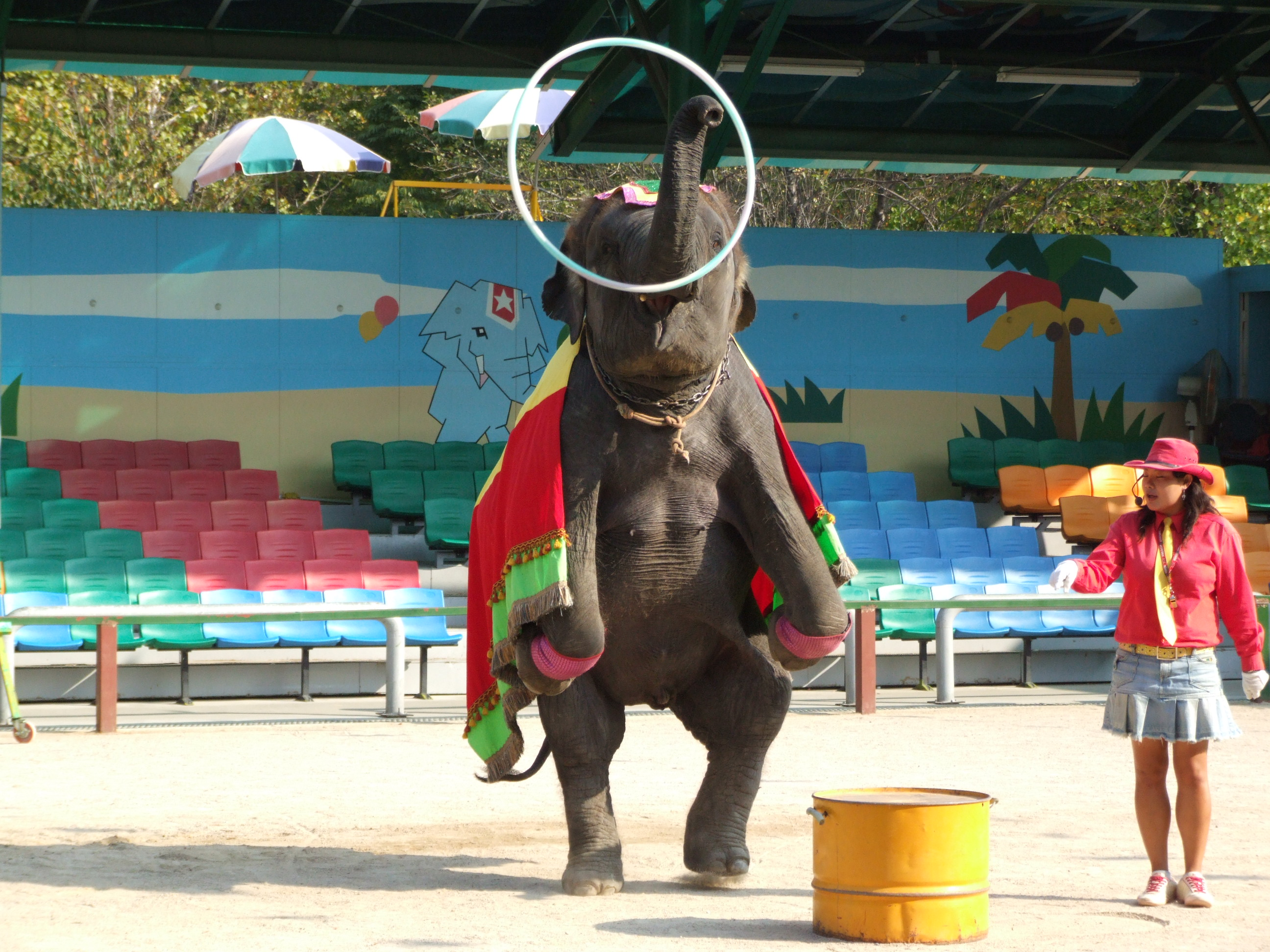
Elephant show at the zoo

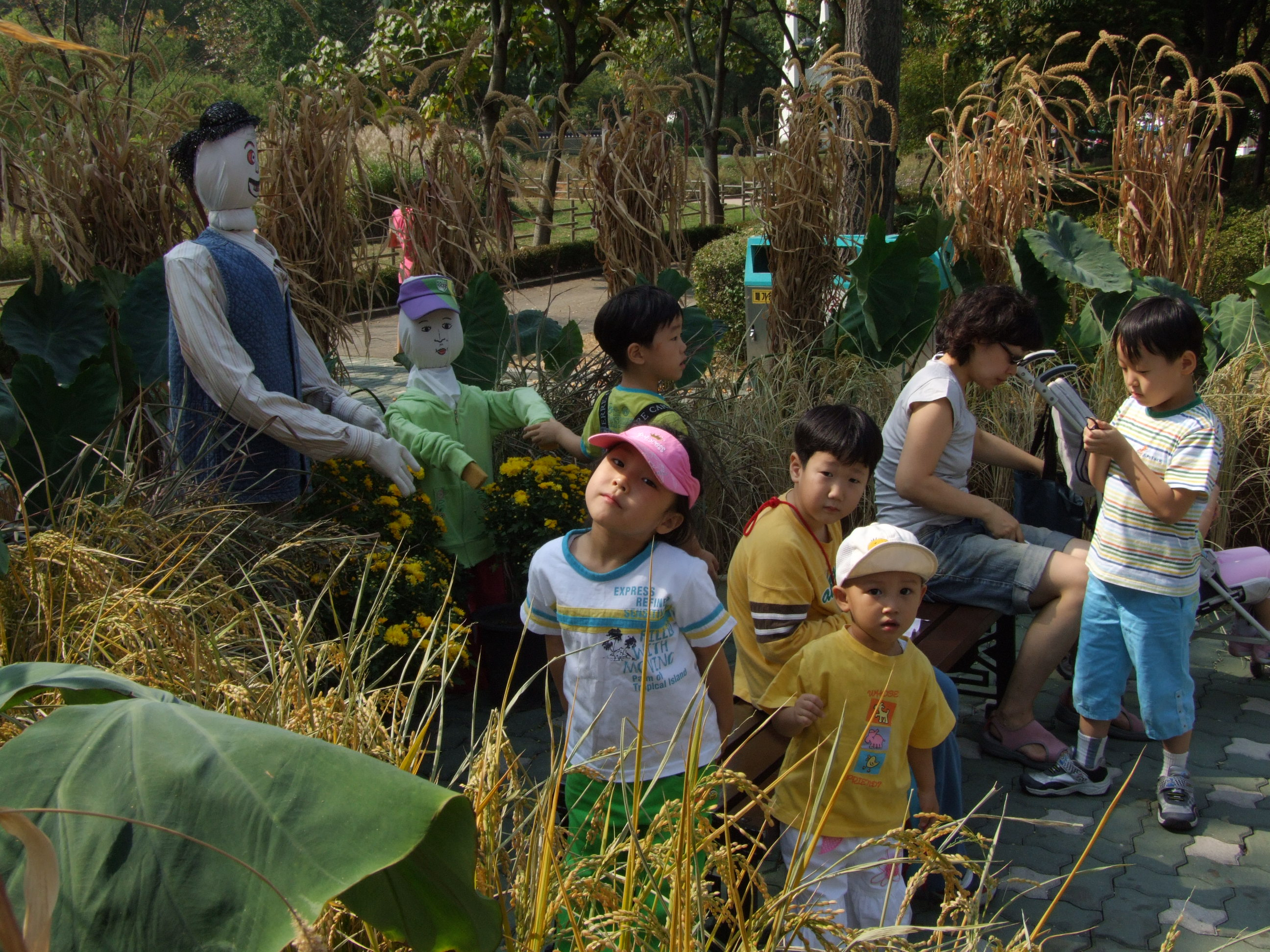
Autumn in Children's Grand Park

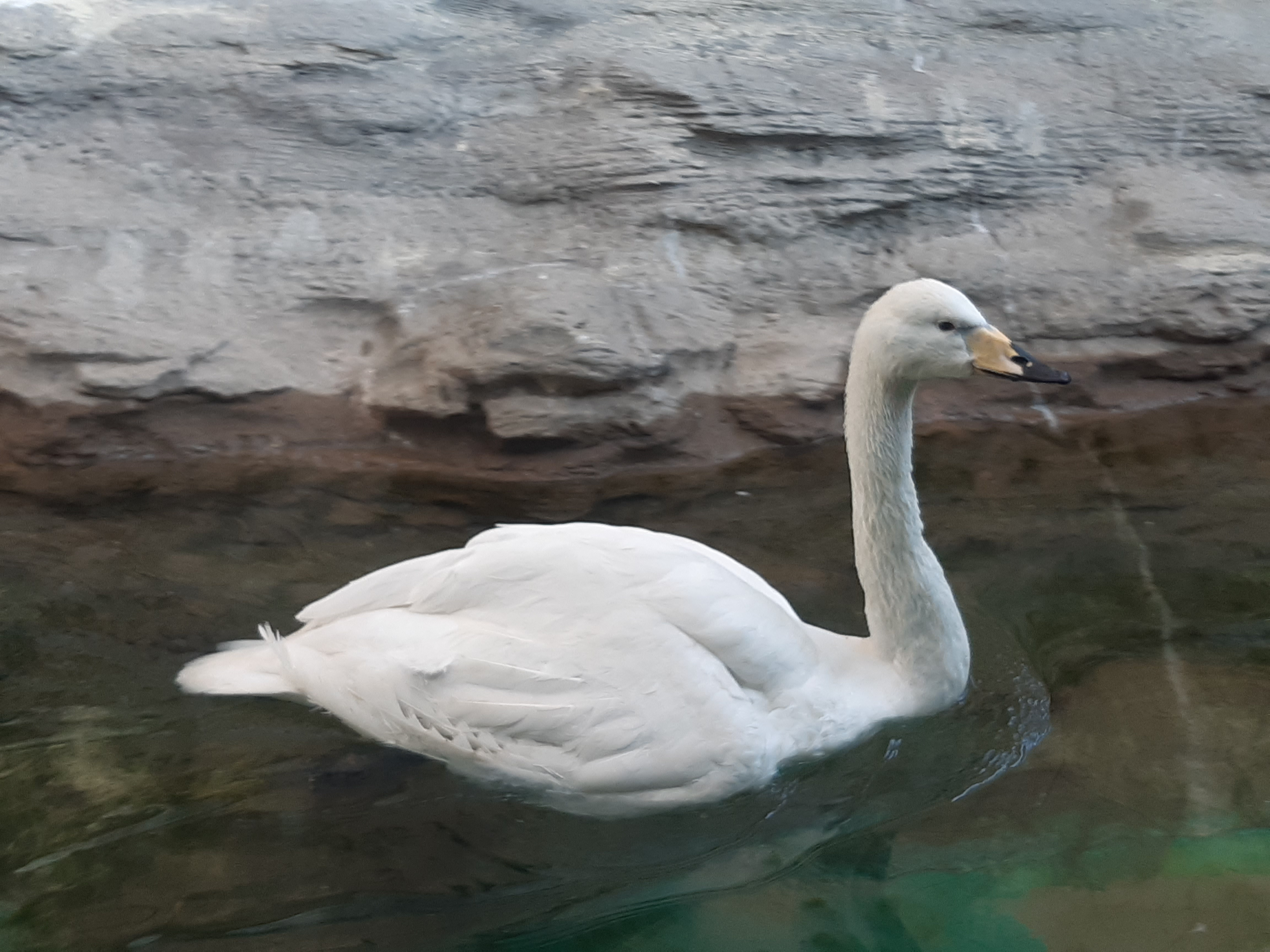
There are no longer any whooper swans at Children's Grand Park

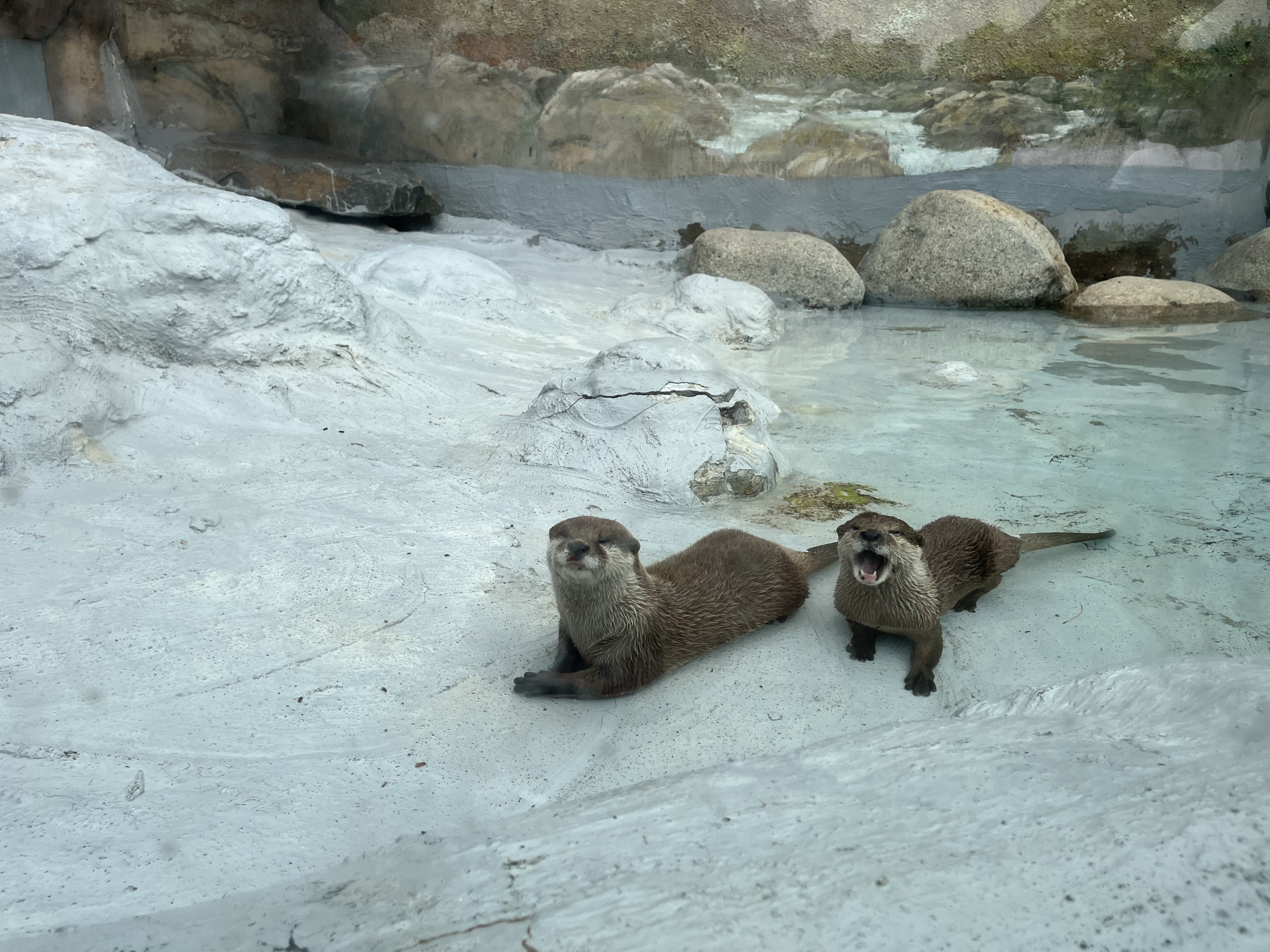
Small clawed otters in the zoo

== See also ==
- Everland
- Seoul Land
- Lotte World
