= Noyu-dong =

- Country: South Korea

Area
  - Total: 1.28 km^{2} (0.49 sq mi)

Population (2001)
  - Total: 31,351
  - Density: 24,500/km^{2} (63,400/sq mi)

Korean name
- Hangul: 노유동
- Hanja: 老遊洞
- RR: Noyu-dong
- MR: Noyu-dong

Noyu-dong (Korean: 노유동) is a dong (neighbourhood) of Gwangjin District, Seoul, South Korea. It is a legal dong (법정동 法定洞) administered under its two administrative dong (행정동 行政洞), Jayang 3-dong and Jayang 4-dong.

== See also ==
- Administrative divisions of South Korea
