= Mojin =

Mojin may refer to:

- Mojin-dong, a dong, neighbourhood of Gwangjin-gu in Seoul, South Korea
- Mojin: The Lost Legend, 2015 Chinese film
- Mojin: The Worm Valley, 2018 Chinese film
