= Star City Mall =

Coordinates: 37°32′16″N 127°4′19″E

Star City (스타시티)
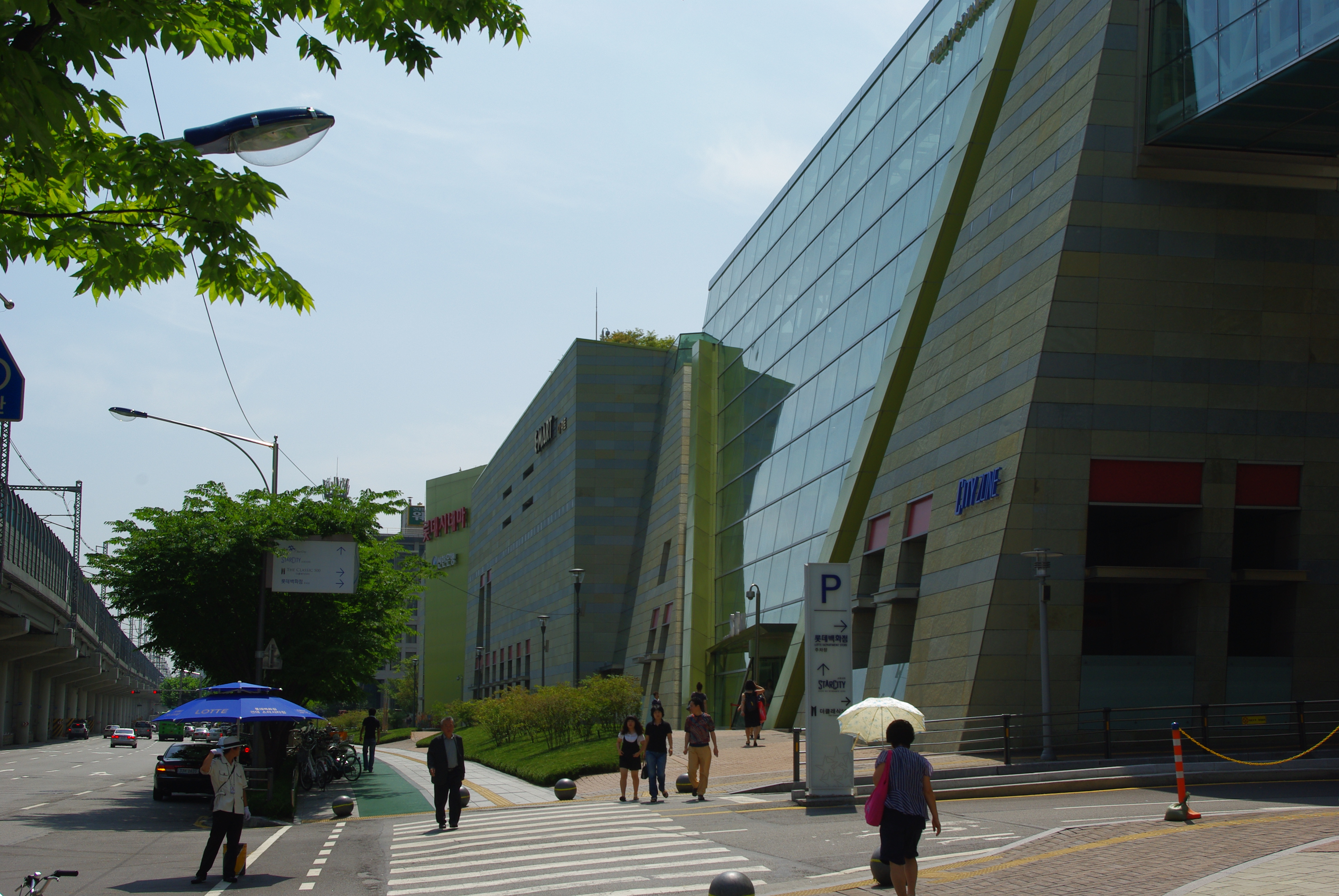
- North side of City Zone section
- Location: Jayang-dong, Seoul
- Address: 227-7 Jayang-dong, Gwangjin-gu, Seoul 143-854
- Developer: POSCO E&C
- Manager: Konkuk AMC
- Architect: Jon Jerde, EaWes
- Num. of anchor tenants: 2
- Floors: 4 in main mall 10 in Lotte Department store
- Parking: Paid
- Website: http://www.starctmall.com

Star City Mall (Korean: 스타시티몰) is a shopping center located in Jayang-dong, Seoul, South Korea. The October 2008 completion of the mall was noted as being the main cause of increase in traffic on Seoul Subway Line 2 during the first half of 2009.
