= Dong Seoul Bus Terminal =

Bus station in Seoul, South Korea

Dong Seoul Bus Terminal 동서울종합터미널
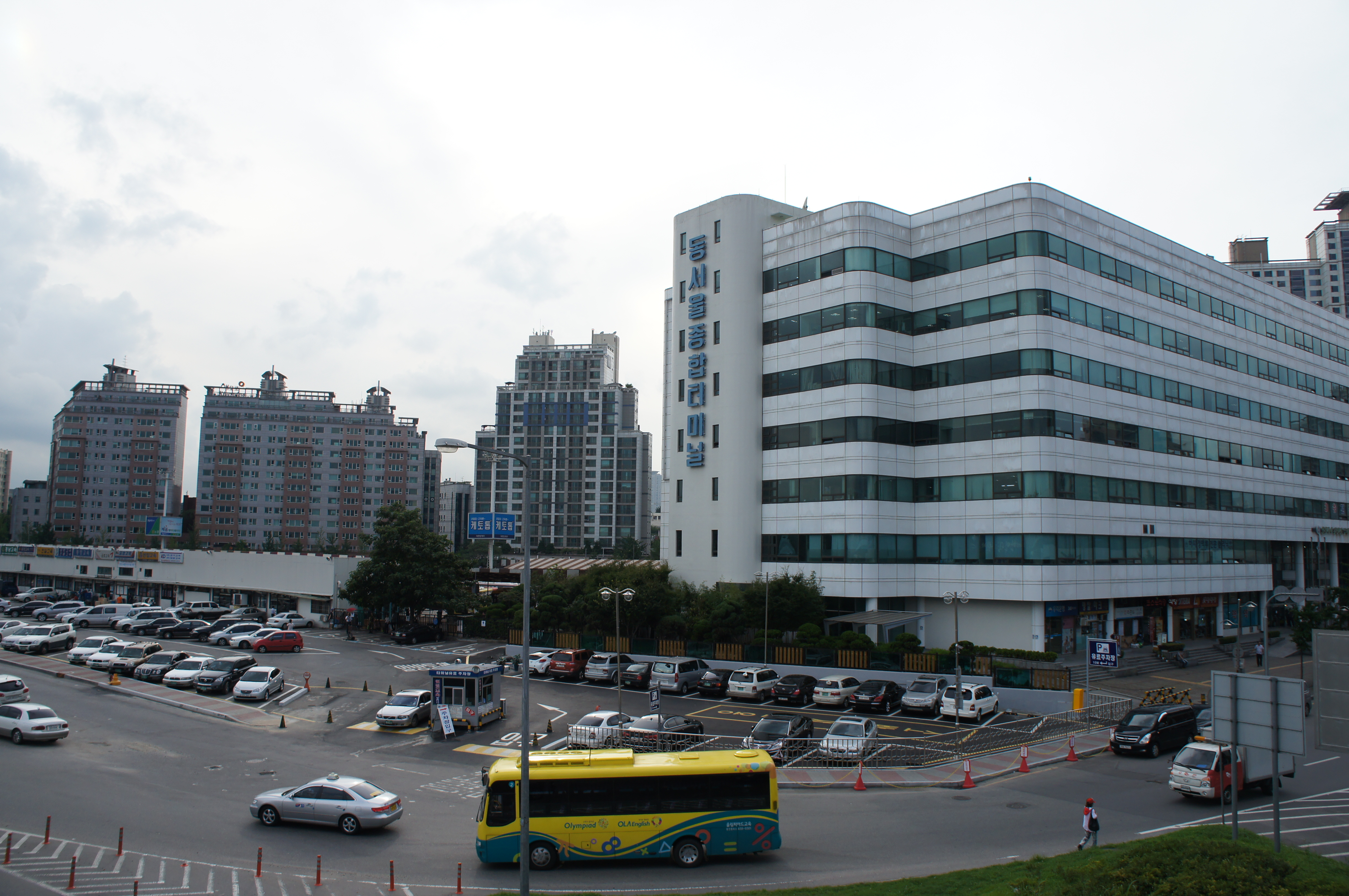

General information
- Location: 50 Gangbyeonyeokro (Gu-wi dong 546-1), Gwangjin-gu, Seoul
- Operator: Dong Seoul Terminal Operation Corp
- Bus operators: Dong Seoul Terminal Operation Corp; Hanjin

Other information
- Website: www.ti21.co.kr

History
- Opened: 1988
Location

Dong Seoul Bus Terminal is a bus terminal located in 50 Gangbyeonyeokro (Gu-wi dong 546-1), Gwangjin-gu, Seoul, South Korea. It is in front of Seoul Subway Line 2 Gangbyeon Station.

It was constructed in 1987, and established in 1990. One of the station's goals was to serve the new Jungbu Expressway. The terminal is operated by Dong Seoul Terminal Operations Corp, but the company is owned by Hanjin.

This terminal uses two national terminal codes: buses which go to Chungchung and Gyeongsang use code 031, and those which go to Gangwon and Jeolla use 032. This terminal is heavily used by soldiers from multiple military bases in Gangwon Province.

== See also ==
- Gangbyeon Station
