= Hwayang-dong =

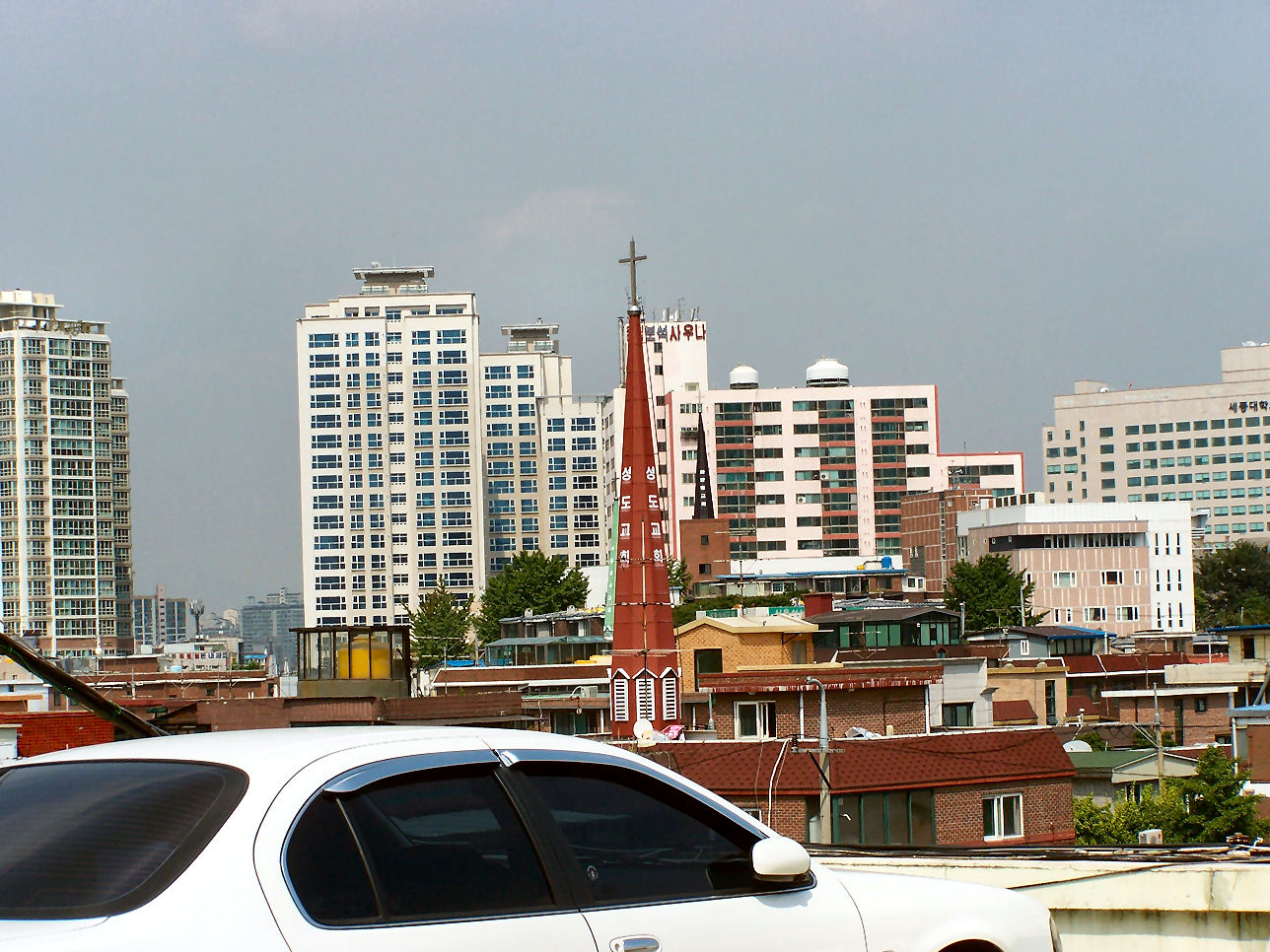
- Hwayang-dong, Seoul
- Interactive map of Hwayang-dong
- Coordinates: 37°32′26″N 127°04′21″E
- Country: South Korea

Area
  - Total: 1.13 km^{2} (0.44 sq mi)

Population (2001)
  - Total: 25,570
  - Density: 22,600/km^{2} (58,600/sq mi)

Korean name
- Hangul: 화양동
- Hanja: 華陽洞
- RR: Hwayang-dong
- MR: Hwayang-dong

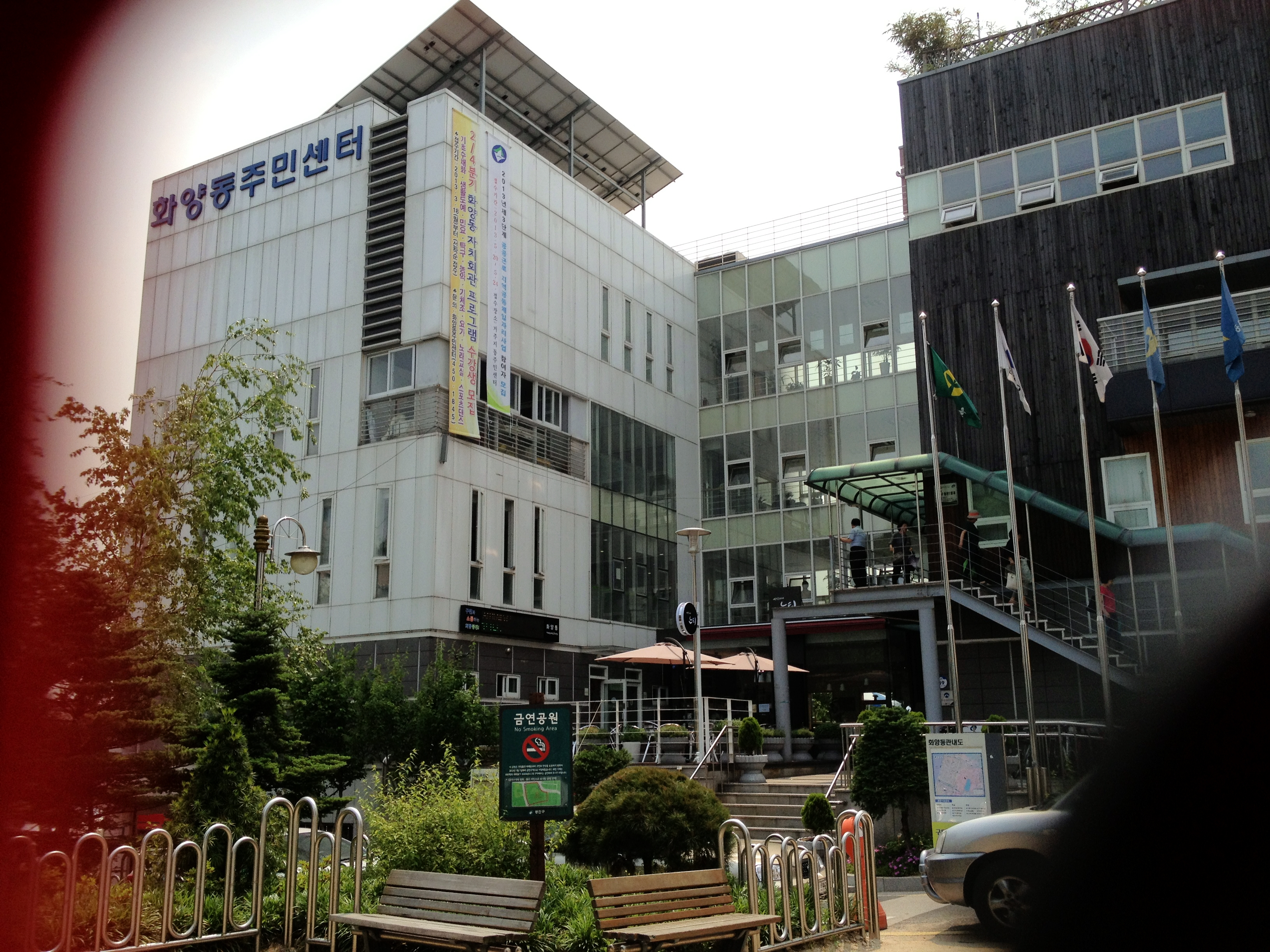
Gwangjin Hwayang-dong Community Service Center

Hwayang-dong (Korean: 화양동) is a dong (neighborhood) located in west Gwangjin District, Seoul, South Korea. It was incorporated into Gwangjin District on August 13, 1949. It is a mixed residential and small business area. Mojin-dong is also administered by Hwayang-dong and contains Konkuk University.

== Name origin ==
The name "Hwayang-dong" is derived from Hwayangjeong (華陽亭), which was established during the Joseon period.

== See also ==
- Administrative divisions of South Korea
