= International Mongolia School =

International school in Seoul, South Korea

Coordinates: 37.54550°N 127.09824°E

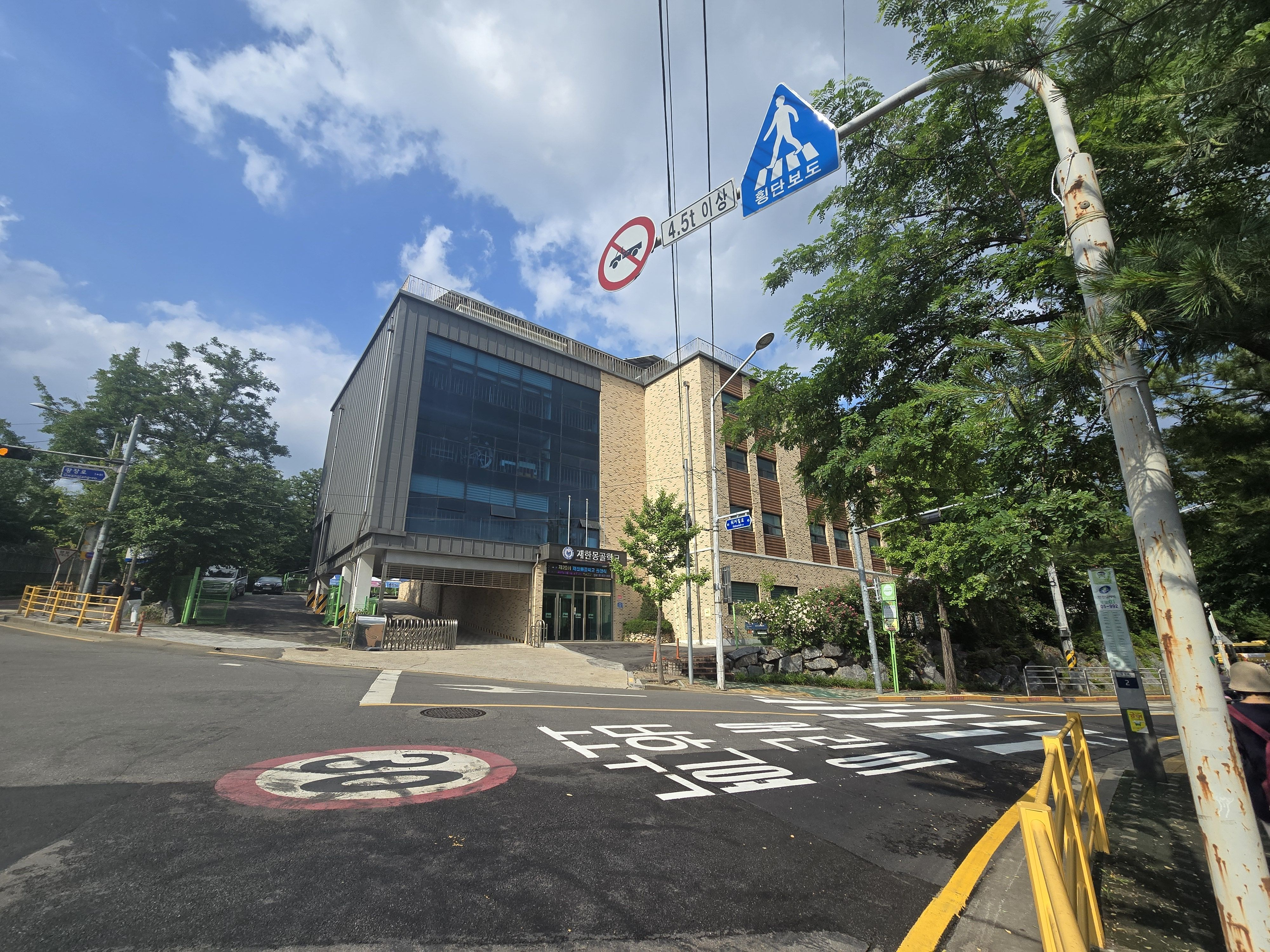
Mongolian school in Korea

The International Mongolia School (Korean: 재한 몽골 학교) is a Mongolian international school in Gwangjin District, Seoul, South Korea. It serves levels primary school through high school.
