= Cheongdam station =

Metro station in Seoul, South Korea

Coordinates: 37°31′09″N 127°03′07″E

청담 (제일정형외과병원); Cheongdam (Cheil Orthopedic Hospital)
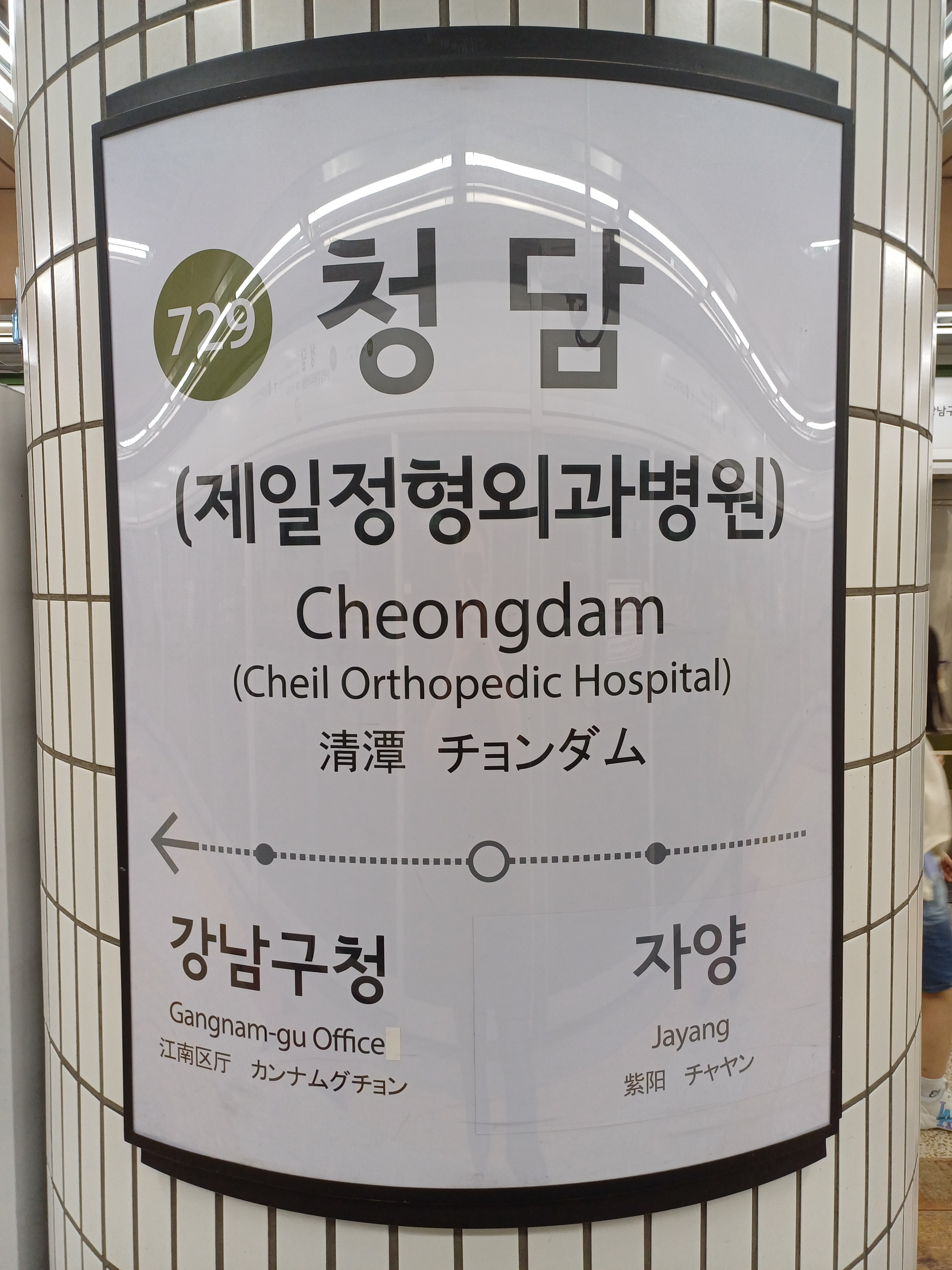
- Station Sign

Korean name
- Hangul: 청담역
- Hanja: 淸潭驛
- Revised Romanization: Cheongdam-yeok
- McCune–Reischauer: Ch'ŏngdam-yŏk

General information
- Location: 77-76 Cheongdam-dong, 508 Hakdongno Jiha, Gangnam-gu, Seoul
- Operator: Seoul Metro
- Line: Line 7
- Platforms: 2
- Tracks: 3

Construction
- Structure type: Underground

Key dates
- August 1, 2000: Line 7 opened
Location

Cheongdam is a station on Line 7 of the Seoul Metropolitan Subway. Wooridul Spine Hospital is located near the station.

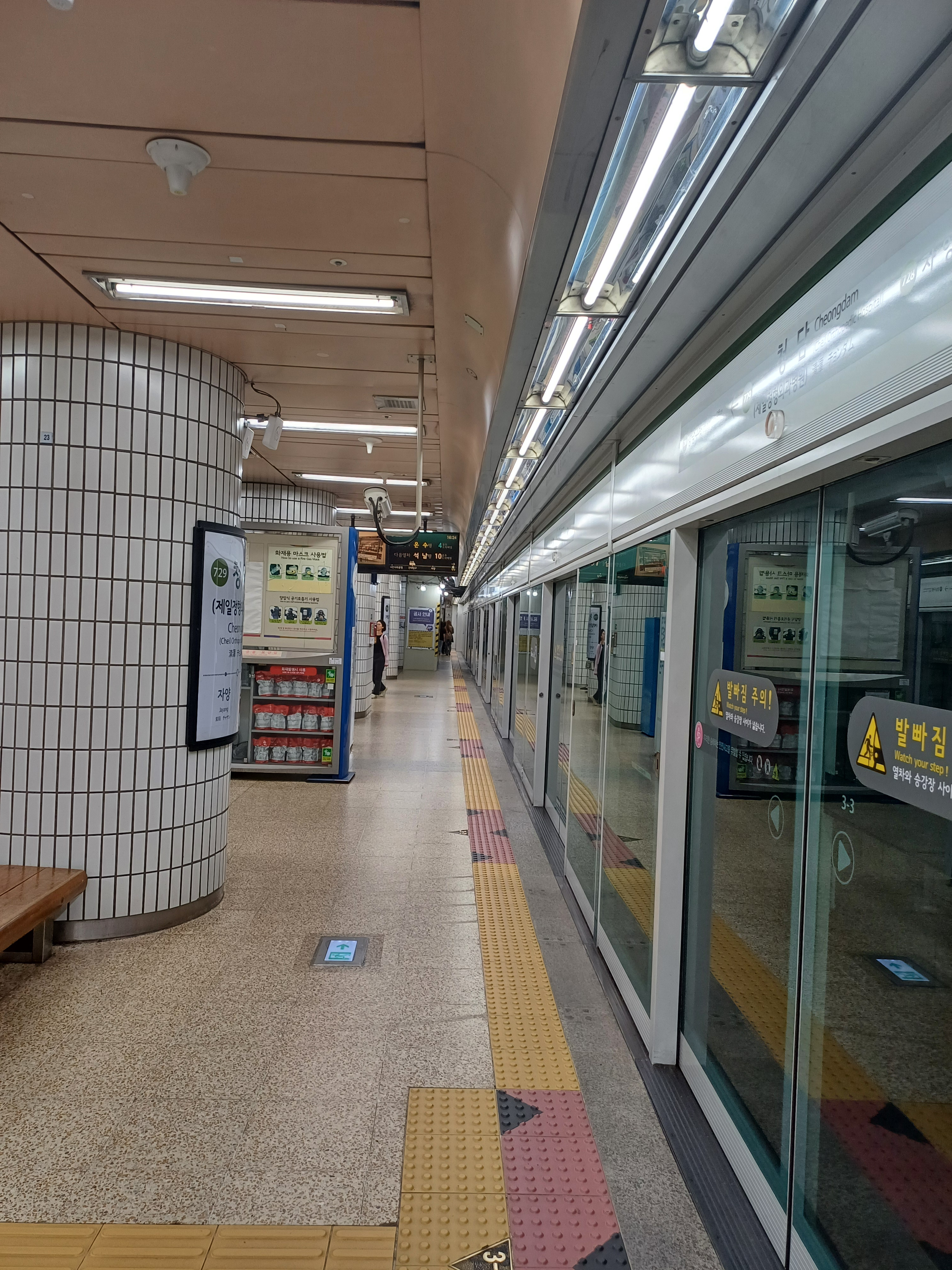
Station platform

== Station layout ==
Jayang ↑
| S/B | N/B |
↓ Gangnam-gu Office

Southbound	← ● Line 7 toward Seongnam
Southbound (Center Track)	← ● Line 7 toward Seongnam
Northbound	● Line 7 toward Jangam →

== Vicinity ==
- Exit 1: Bongeun Elementary & Middle Schools
- Exit 2: Kyunggi High School, Bongeunsa
- Exit 3:
- Exit 4:
- Exit 5:
- Exit 6:
- Exit 7: Gangnam District Office, Cheongdam Market
- Exit 8: Eonbuk Elementary School
- Exit 9:
- Exit 10:
- Exit 11: Cheongdam Park
- Exit 12:
- Exit 13: Riviera Hotel
- Exit 14: Samik APT

Preceding station	Seoul Metropolitan Subway	Following station
Jayang towards Jangam	Line 7	Gangnam-gu Office towards Seongnam
