= Gunja-dong =

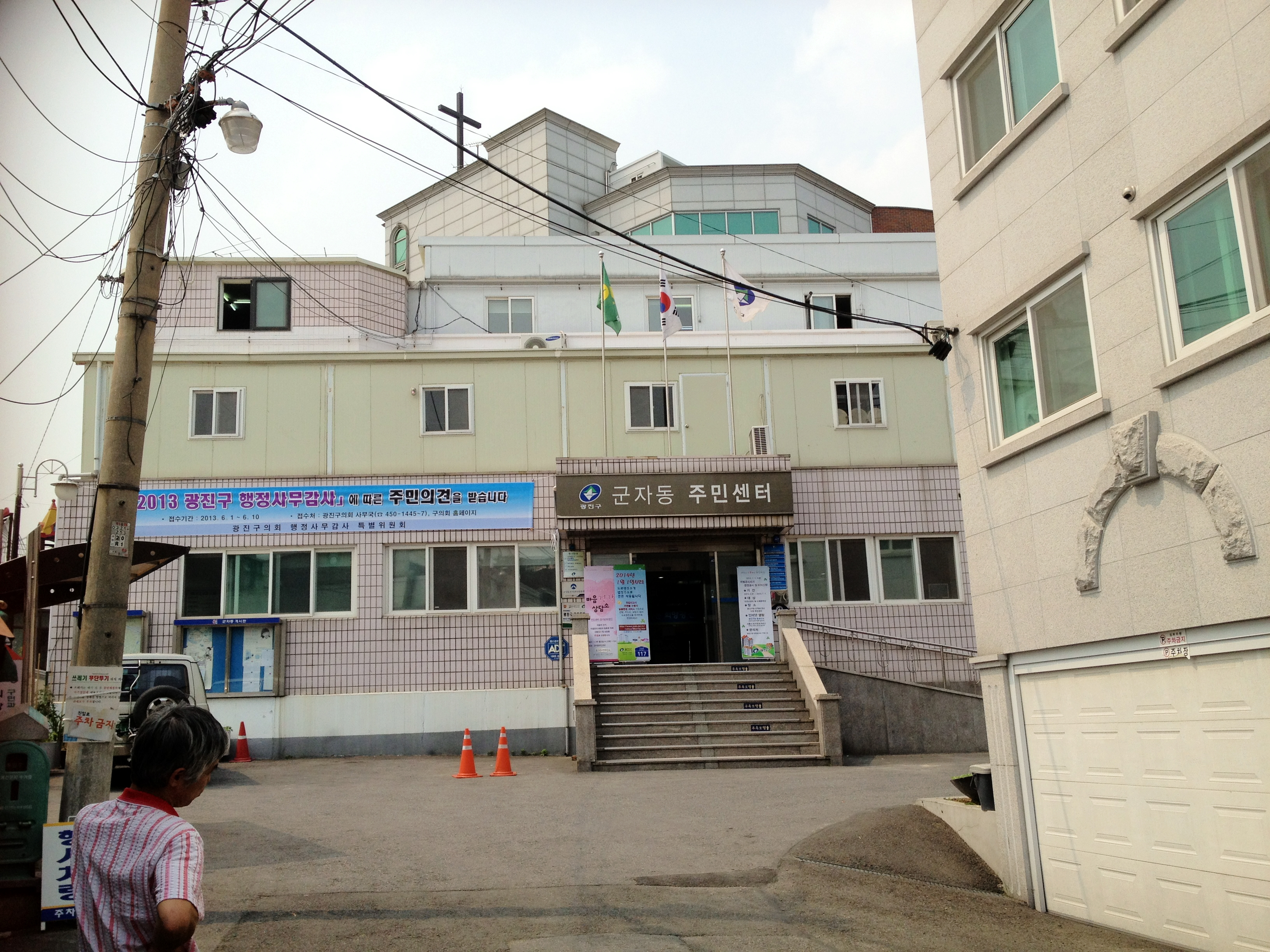
- Gwangjin Gunja-dong Community Service Center
- Interactive map of Gunja-dong
- Country: South Korea

Area
  - Total: 0.85 km^{2} (0.33 sq mi)

Population (2001)
  - Total: 24,800
  - Density: 29,000/km^{2} (76,000/sq mi)

Korean name
- Hangul: 군자동
- Hanja: 君子洞
- RR: Gunja-dong
- MR: Kunja-dong

Gunja-dong (Korean: 군자동) is a dong (neighborhood) of Gwangjin District, Seoul, South Korea. It is a transportation hub located on the southern side of Cheonho-daero, to the left of Jungnangcheon.

== Name origin ==
The origin story behind the name of Gunja-dong is as follows: In ancient times, a group accompanying a king happened to stay at the Dongirobyeon in this area. During their stay, the queen gave birth to a prince, and the place was named Gunja-dong, meaning "the place where the king's son was born." It is still referred to as "Myeongnyeonggungteo" to this day.

== See also ==
- Administrative divisions of South Korea
