= Neung-dong =

- Interactive map of Neung-dong
- Coordinates: 37.5478°N 127.0810°E
- Country: South Korea

Area
  - Total: 0.88 km^{2} (0.34 sq mi)

Population (2001)
  - Total: 11,419
  - Density: 13,000/km^{2} (34,000/sq mi)

Korean name
- Hangul: 능동
- Hanja: 陵洞
- RR: Neung-dong
- MR: Nŭng-dong

Neung-dong (Korean: 능동) is a dong (neighbourhood) of Gwangjin District, Seoul, South Korea.

== Overview ==
Neung-dong was historically a densely populated area encompassing several surrounding villages, with approximately 300 households during its peak prosperity. Originally a village where multiple surnames coexisted, it underwent a transformation in 1904 with the establishment of Empress Sunmyeong's Yugangwon, leading to its renaming as Neunggol. The area was subsequently divided into three distinct villages oriented around the central Chiseongdang, where the Chiseong rite was conducted. These villages were designated as Bukchon (north), Namchon (south), and Seochon (west), respectively.

== See also ==
- Administrative divisions of South Korea
