= Jayang-dong =

Coordinates: 37°12′N 126°52′E

- Interactive map of Jayang-dong
- Country: South Korea

Area
  - Total: 3.39 km^{2} (1.31 sq mi)

Population (2001)
  - Total: 87,567
  - Density: 25,800/km^{2} (66,900/sq mi)

Korean name
- Hangul: 자양동
- Hanja: 紫陽洞
- RR: Jayang-dong
- MR: Chayang-dong

Jayang-dong (Korean: 자양동) is a dong (neighborhood) of Gwangjin District, Seoul, South Korea.

== Name origin ==
During the Joseon period, the name of Jangyang-dong was "Jamajang" (雌馬場), which translates to "female horse field." The term "jamajang" refers to a female horse. In the early days of the Joseon Dynasty, there was a legend that if one were to raise a thousand horses, a mythical creature called Yongma (龍馬), a dragon-horse, would be born. This led to a great interest in horse breeding in various regions. Jangyang-dong, being an area where fertile sediments flowed through the Han River and accumulated, had vast natural fields, making it advantageous for grazing horses. As a result, a significant number of female horses were raised in this area. Having a large number of female horses in a ranch facilitates the mass breeding of horses through reproduction. The name "Jamajang" was later changed to "Jamajang-ri" (雌馬場里), and during the period of Japanese colonial rule, the Chinese character for "ja" (馬) was changed to 紫, resulting in the current name of Jangyang-dong.

== See also ==
- Administrative divisions of South Korea
