= Mojin-dong =

- Country: South Korea

Korean name
- Hangul: 모진동
- Hanja: 毛陳洞
- RR: Mojin-dong
- MR: Mojin-dong

Mojin-dong (Korean: 모진동) is a dong (neighbourhood) of Gwangjin District, Seoul, South Korea.

== See also ==
- Administrative divisions of South Korea
