= Lotte World =

Indoor theme park in Seoul, South Korea

- Lotte World and Lotte World Tower in 2022
- Interactive map of Lotte World
- Location: Sincheon-dong, Seoul, South Korea
- Coordinates: 37.51°N 127.10°E
- Status: Operating
- Opened: July 12, 1989
- Owner: Lotte Corporation
- Theme: indoor planet ride
- Operating season: Year-round
- Attendance: 7.3 million
- Area: 128,246 m^{2} (1,380,430 sq ft)
- Website: www.lotteworld.com

- Lotte World
- Hangul: 롯데월드
- RR: Rotde woldeu
- MR: Rotte wŏldŭ

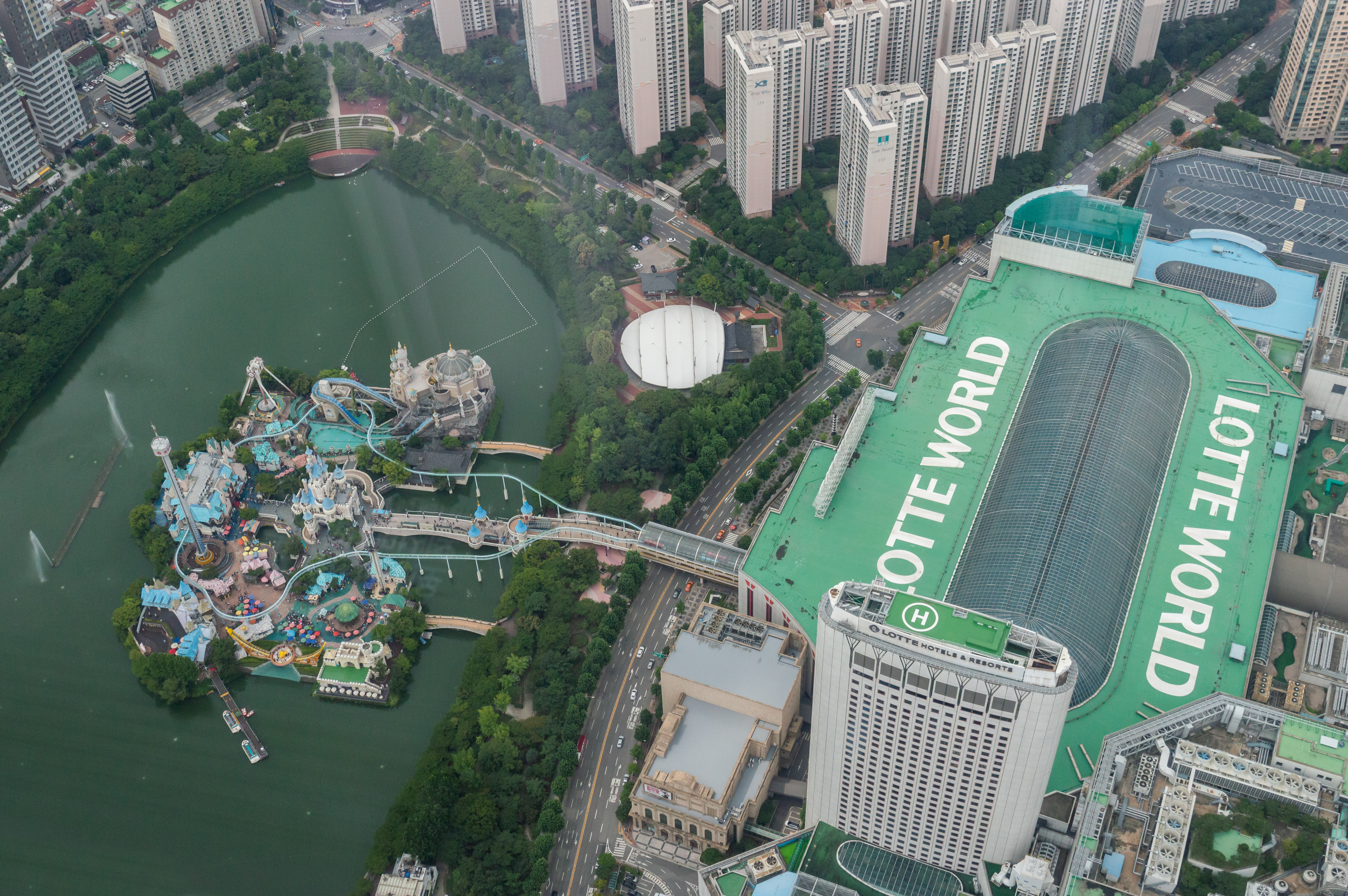
Lotte World, seen from the Lotte World Tower

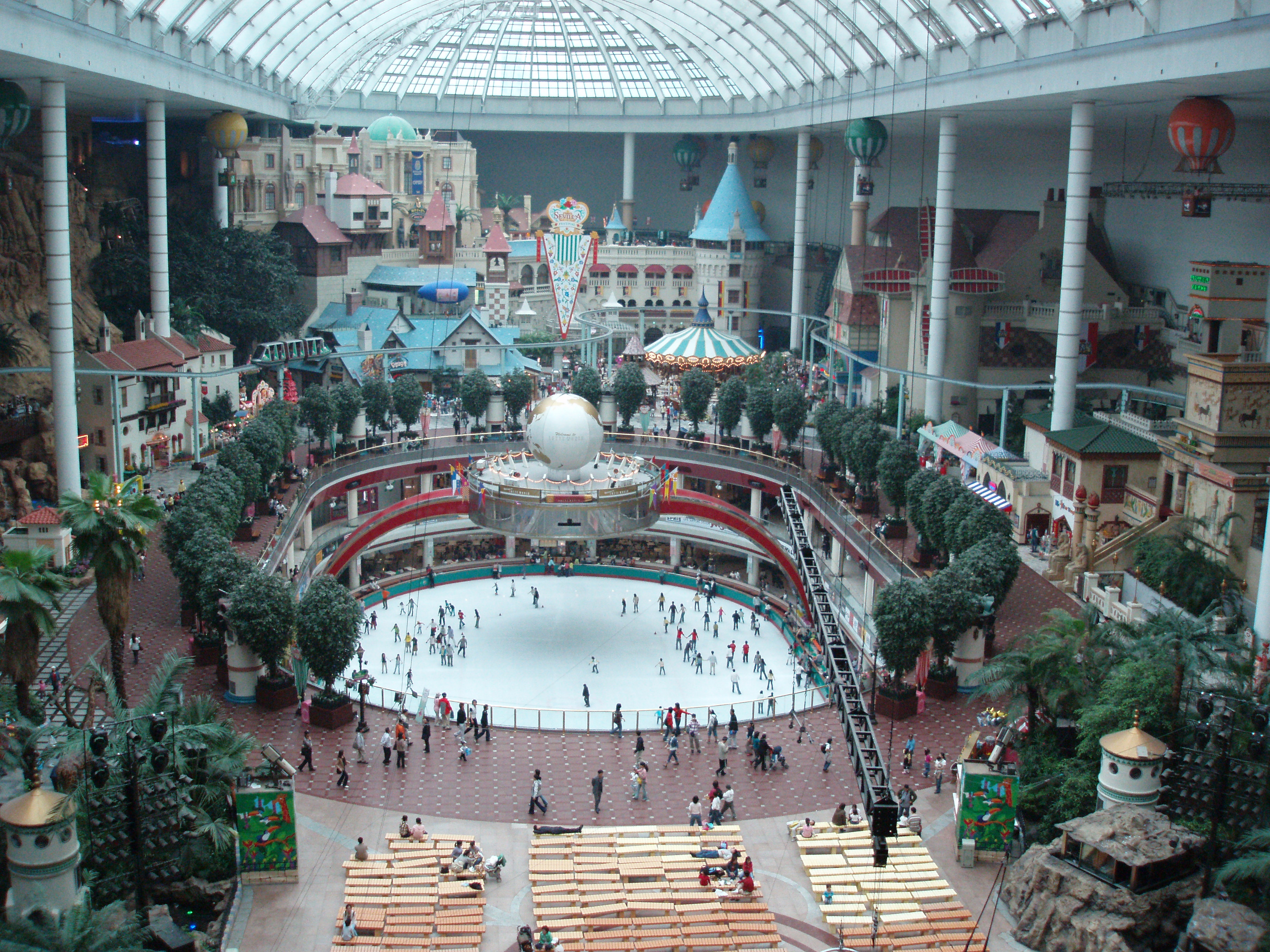
Lotte World

Map

Lotte World or Lotte World Adventure (Korean: 롯데월드 어드벤처) is a theme park and major recreation complex in Seoul, South Korea. Opened in July 1989, Lotte World consists of a large indoor theme park, an outdoor amusement park called "Magic Island", shopping malls, a luxury hotel, an observation tower, a Korean folk museum, sports facilities and movie theaters. Lotte World's sister theme park, Lotte World Adventure Busan, opened in March 2022. In 2023 Lotte World received 5.1 million visitors, making it the 23rd-most visited theme park in the world that year and the tenth-most visited in Asia.

== General information ==
Lotte World is located in Sincheon-dong, Songpa District, Seoul, South Korea. It is made up of two main sections, the outdoor amusement park Magic Island, and Adventure (indoors).

Lotte World is open all year long, without any holiday closings. Its operating hours are from 10 am to 9 pm. Depending on weather conditions (below 0 °C or above 30 °C, wind speed over 7~14m^{2}, rain over 0.2mm) some Magic Island attractions may be closed.

Ticket fee. Exit
	Adult	Teenager	Child	Baby (under 48 month)
1 Day	62,000 KRW (47.12 USD)	54,000 KRW (41.04 USD)	47,000 KRW (35.72 USD)	15,000 KRW (11.40 USD)
After 4 PM	50,000 KRW (38.00 USD)	43,000 KRW (32.68 USD)	36,000 KRW (27.36 USD)	15,000 KRW (11.40 USD)

== Opening ==
Construction started on Lotte World Adventure in 1985. It opened at 11 a.m. on July 12, 1989. Magic Island opened on March 24, 1990. It is located near Jamsil Station on Seoul Subway Line 2 and Seoul Subway Line 8. In the early days, there was a market and a New Country Supermarket. In 1990, the New Country Supermarket was absorbed by Lotte Shopping and changed its name to Lotte Department Store in Jamsil in 1998.

In Seomyeon, Busan, there was Lotte World Sky Plaza, which started construction in 1992 and opened in 1996. It was not profitable due to the lack of a free pass and annual membership system. In 1999, it was demolished due to safety issues with the Sky Plaza and Loop. Busan Lotte World Sky Plaza has now been replaced by Lotte Cinema multiplex theaters.

The initial hours of operation were 9:30 a.m. to 8 p.m., but the hours have since changed from 9:30 a.m. to 11 p.m. since 1998 when marketing was conducted, stating "every day until 11 p.m." Lotte World rose 20 percent when sales at other theme parks in Korea fell about 20 percent during the IMF bailout.

There are more than 40 different kinds of amusement facilities, including Gyro Drop and Atlantis. There are large-scale fantasy parades at 2 p.m. and 7 p.m. every day, except Monday. On December 12, 2007, the total number of visitors exceeded 100 million. In 2012, foreign tourists accounted for 10 percent of the total. Lotte Department Store Jamsil branch and duty-free shop are also famous tourist attractions. In the Seoul metropolitan area, it is considered one of the top three entertainment facilities along with Everland and Seoul Land. In 2011, it ranked 11th in the world in number of visitors, with 7.58 million visitors.

In May 2013, Lotte World Underland, a theme zone with the theme of a goblin village, was opened on the first basement floor. The 4D Shooting Theater, Media Zone, and restaurants were located in Underland as well.

In the case of Magic Island, there was a high-altitude series of high-altitude fighter jets, high-altitude parachutes and high-altitude wave rides in the 1990s. Now, there are a gyro attractions consisting of Gyro Drop, Gyro Swing, and Gyro Spin.

Lotte World Ice Rink, which measures 36 m × 65 m (118 ft × 213 ft) on the third basement floor of Adventure, is a skating attraction. On the west side of Adventure was Lotte World Swimming. KidZania, a children's vocational theme park, is located here.

Lotte World opened the Gimhae Lotte Water Park in Jangyu-dong, Gimhae, Gyeongsangnam-do from 2014 to 2015. In October 2014, Lotte World Aquarium was opened within Lotte World Mall in Songpa District, Seoul. In 2016, Lotte World Kids Park was opened in Eunpyeong Lotte Mall.

In 2021, the Busan Lotte World Magic Forest Theme Park, also known as Osiria Theme Park, was opened at the Dongbu Mountain Tourist Complex in Gijang-gun, Busan.

== Entertainment ==
- WORLD OF LIGHT: In celebration of its 35th anniversary in 2024, Lotte World launched a new parade, 'WORLD OF LIGHT,' with a production budget of 10 billion South Korean won.

== Live shows ==
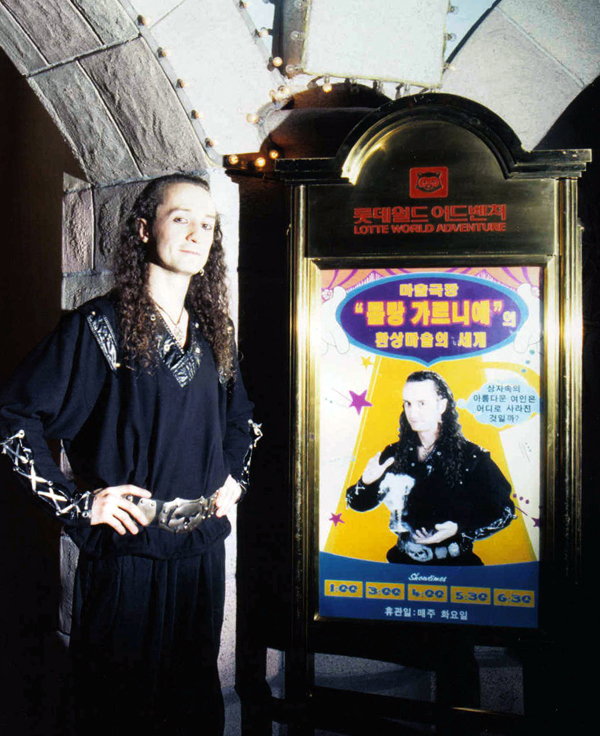
The illusionist Loran at the Magic Theatre

- Magic Theatre: The « Magic Theatre » is a theatre of about 200 seats, featuring magicians and illusionists from Korea, as well as several other countries around the world. One of those was the Canadian illusionist Loran, who was featured from July to December 1997, accomplishing more than 700 performances. Loran is an international artist whose magic is hallmarked in a Medieval-Gothic style.

== In popular culture ==
- Lotte World was one of several locations used for filming the Korean drama Stairway to Heaven, namely the carousel, ice rink and as the seat of Cha Song-joo's family business.
- The South Korean boy band H.O.T. shot the video for their single "Candy" in Lotte World.
- Lotte World was one of several locations used for filming the Korean drama Hyde Jekyll, Me.
- Lotte World was featured on the South Korean variety/reality show Welcome, First Time in Korea?.
- The British K-Pop girl group KAACHI filmed their music video "Get up" in Lotte World.

== See also ==
- Lotte Group
- Everland
- Seoul Land
- Children's Grand Park, Seoul

General:

- List of South Korean tourist attractions
- Contemporary culture of South Korea
