= List of neighborhoods of Seoul =

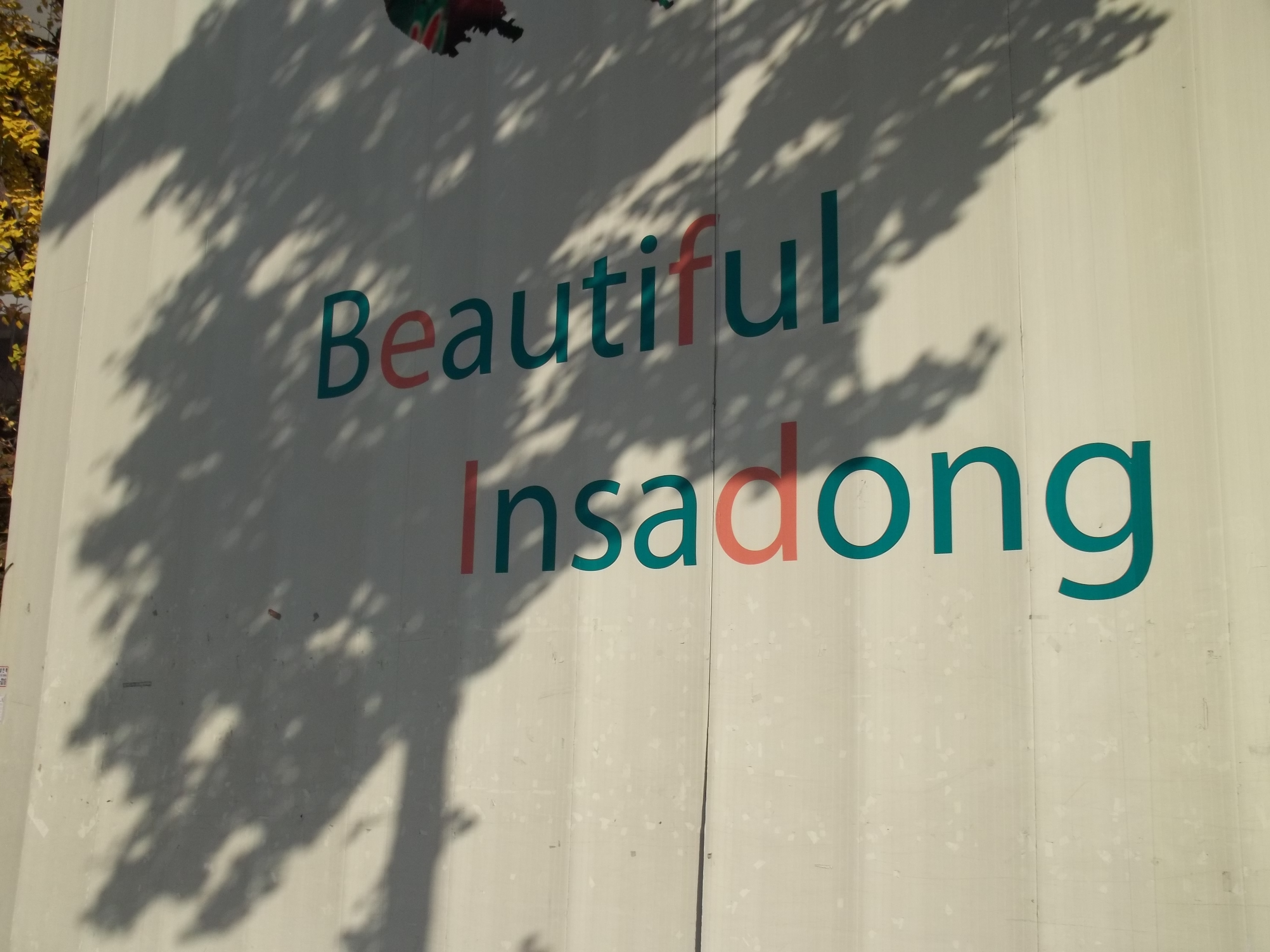
Insadong street sign, 2014.

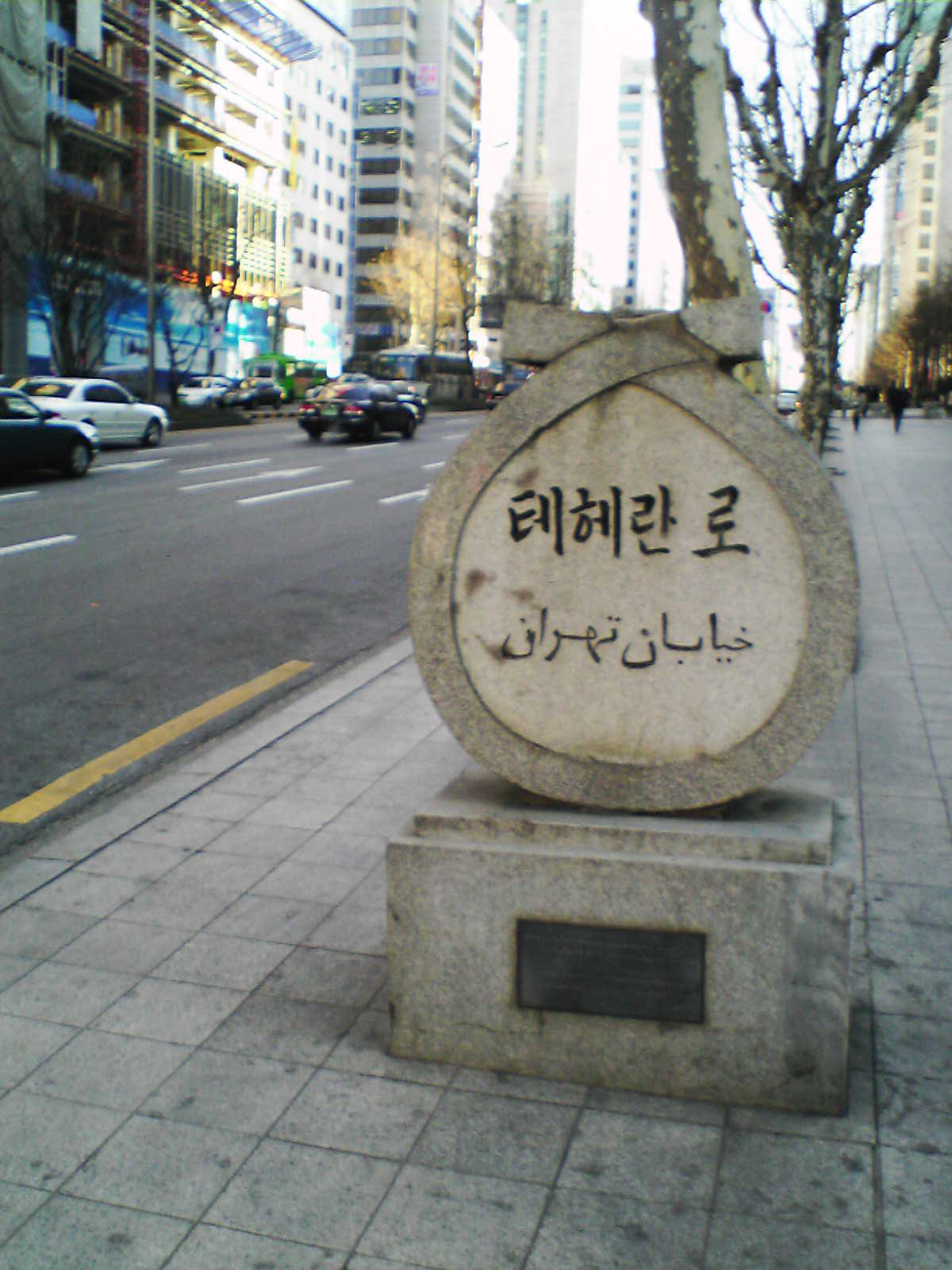
Teheranno road post that says "Tehran Road" both in Korean hangul (테헤란로) and Persian (خیابان تهران), 2007.

Neighborhoods of Seoul are not governmental administrative divisions, but rather more informal area designations, often surrounding a particular landmark, such as a road, a university, or a gate of the old city.

Names are listed in Hangul and Hanja.

- Apgujeong (압구정 狎鷗亭)
- Bukchon Hanok Village (북촌 한옥마을 北村 韓屋마을)
- Cartoon Street (카툰 거리)
- Cheongdam-dong (청담동 淸潭洞)
- Daehangno (대학로 大學路)
- Dongdaemun (동대문 東大門)
- Gangnam (강남 江南)
- Guryong
- Hongdae (홍대 弘大)
- Idae (이대 梨大)
- Ihwa Mural Village (이화 벽화마을)
- Insadong (인사동 仁寺洞)
- Itaewon (이태원 梨泰院)
- Jongno (종로 鐘路)
- Myeongdong (명동 明洞)
- Namdaemun (남대문 南大門)
- Seorae Village (서래마을 西來마을)
- Sillim (신림 新林)
- Sincheon (신천 新川)
- Sinchon (신촌 新村)
- Teheranno (테헤란로)
- Yeouido (여의도 汝矣島)
