= Sincheon-dong, Seoul =

Sincheon-dong
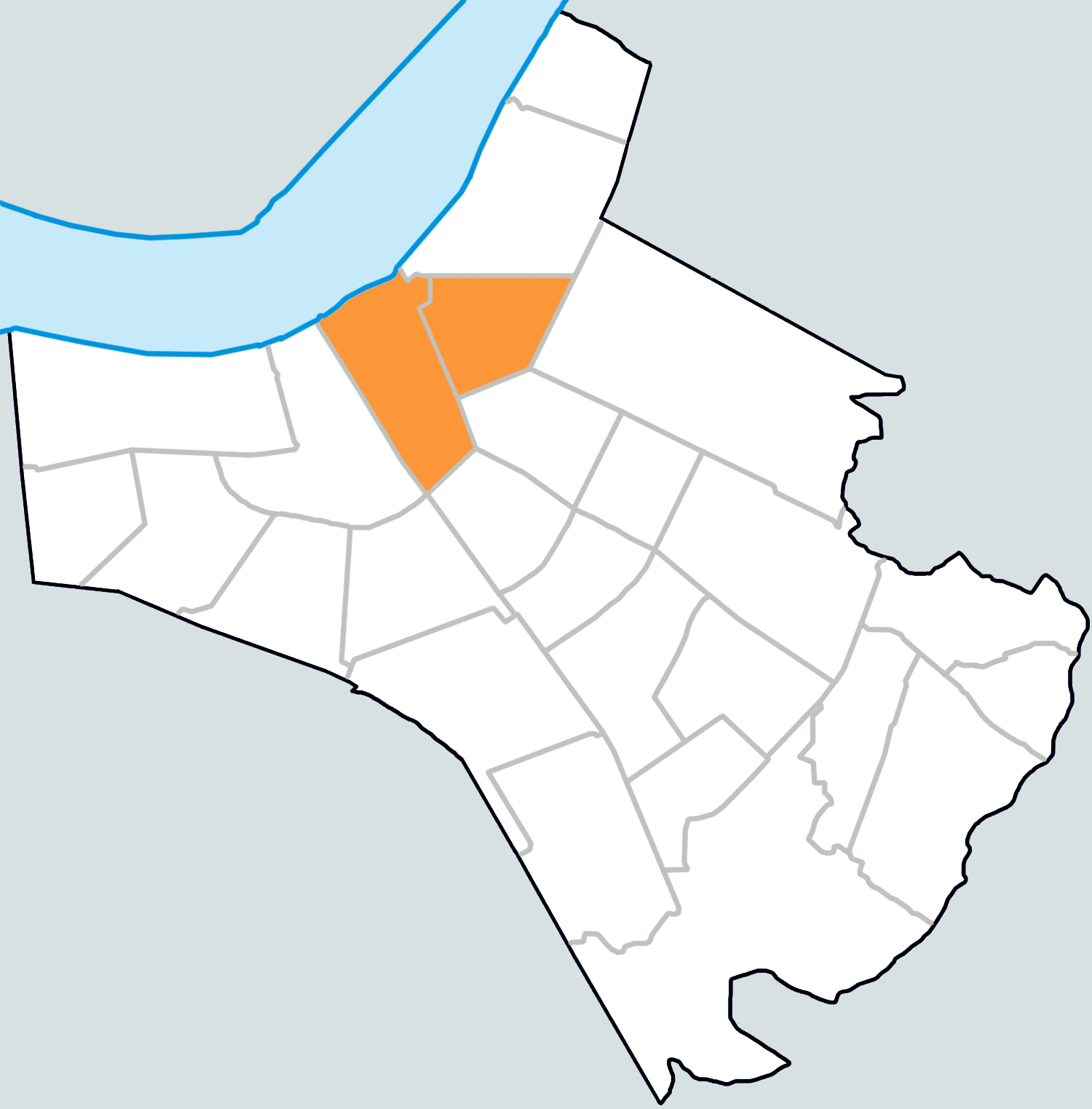
- Country: South Korea

Area
  - Total: 2.45 km^{2} (0.95 sq mi)

Population (2013)
  - Total: 49,118
  - Density: 20,000/km^{2} (51,900/sq mi)

Korean name
- Hangul: 신천동
- Hanja: 新川洞
- RR: Sincheon-dong
- MR: Sinch'ŏn-dong

Sincheon-dong (Korean: 신천동) is a neighbourhood (dong) in Songpa District, Seoul, South Korea. It is served by Jamsillaru Station on Seoul Subway Line 2. The name means "new stream" and is a name for several other places in South and North Korea.

== History and etymology ==
The name of the area, originally a part of the land north of the Han River in the present-day Jayang-dong of Gwangjin District, is believed to have originated from a small river that was created due to a great flood. This flood caused a new waterway to form in the northern part of what is now the Jamsil area. The newly formed stream was referred to as "Saenae," "Saegaecheon," "Sincheongang," or "Sincheon" (meaning "new river") in reference to its recent creation. This led to the naming of the area as "Sincheon-ri" (新川里), which translates to "New River Village."

Meanwhile, the area around Jamsilsaenae Station on Seoul Subway Line 2 is also referred to as "Sincheon," although it shares the same origin in name, it is not directly connected to the original Sincheon-ri. This area is named after the people of "Saenae Village" who had originally lived on Jamsil Island. They migrated to the vicinity of the Jamsilbon-dong Saemaeul Market, and the area came to be known as "Sincheon."

Historically, the area in front of Saenae Village, now the current landmass, was also part of Sincheon-dong, but due to administrative boundary adjustments, it was incorporated into Jamsil-dong. Jamsilsaenae Station has always been part of Jamsil-dong. During the development of the Jamsil area, part of Seoul Asan Hospital was transferred to Pungnap-dong, while significant portions of the eastern part of Jamsil 4-dong were incorporated from neighboring districts, including Idong and Pungnap-dong.

== Education ==
Schools located in Sincheon-dong:

- Jamdong Elementary School
- Jamhyun Elementary School
- Jamsil Elementary School
- Jamsil Middle School
- Jamsil High School

== Transportation ==
- Jamsilnaru Station of
- Jamsil Station of and of
- Mongchontoseong Station of

== See also ==
- Administrative divisions of South Korea
