= Jamsil station =

Subway station in South Korea

| 잠실 (송파구청); Jamsil (Songpa-gu Office) |
| 잠실 (송파구청); Jamsil (Songpa-gu Office) |
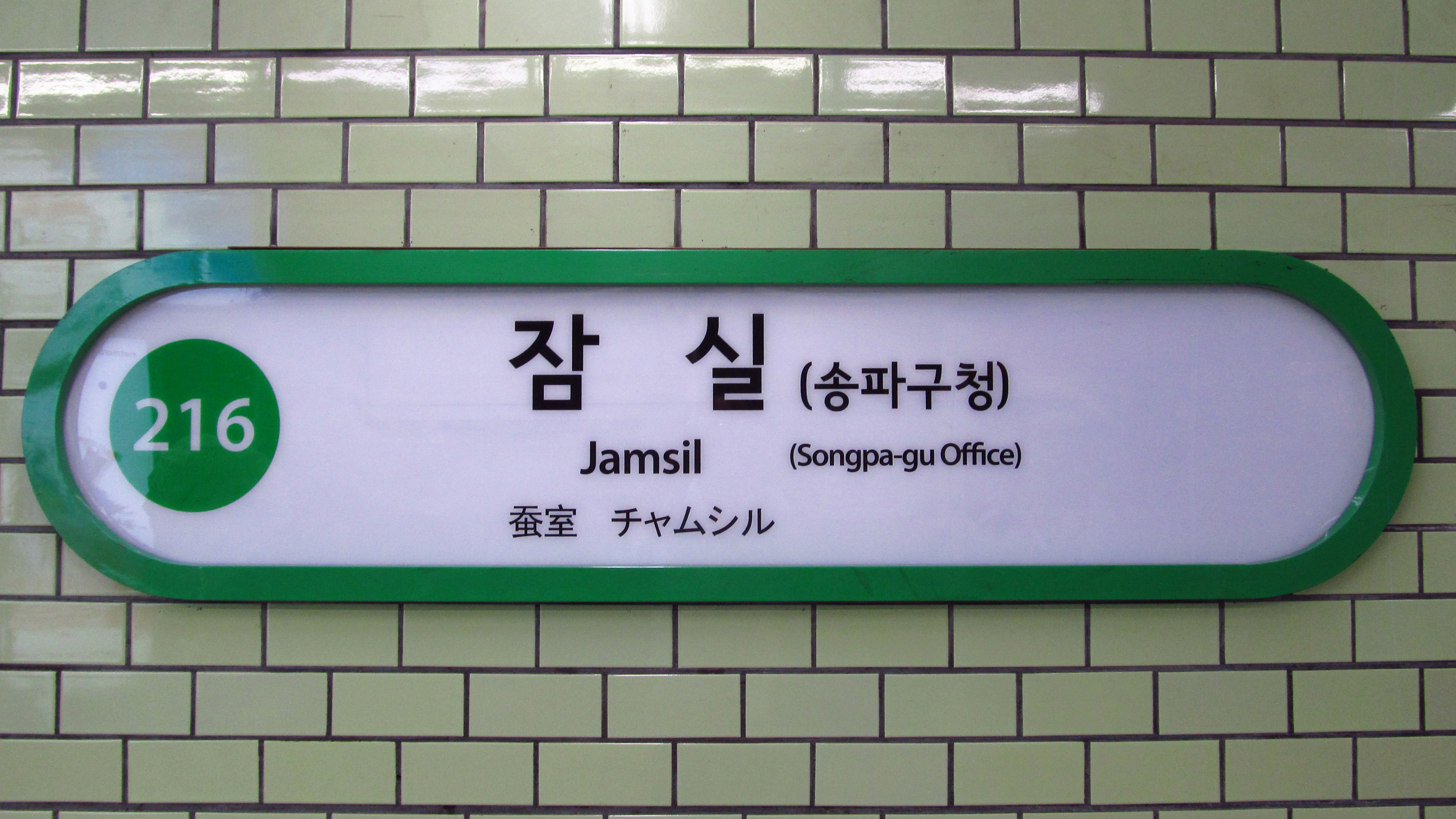
- Station sign (Line 2)

Korean name
- Hangul: 잠실역
- Hanja: 蠶室驛
- Revised Romanization: Jamsillyeok
- McCune–Reischauer: Chamsillyŏk

General information
- Location: 567 Songpa-daero, 27 Jamsil 5-dong, Songpa District, Seoul
- Coordinates: 37°30′48″N 127°06′01″E
- Operator: Seoul Metro
- Lines: Line 2 Line 8
- Platforms: 4
- Tracks: 4

Construction
- Structure type: Underground

Key dates
- October 31, 1980: Line 2 opened
- November 23, 1996: Line 8 opened

Passengers
- (Daily); Line 2: 155,229 (based on 2024 data); Line 8: 20,880 (based on 2012 data)

Services
| Preceding station | Seoul Metropolitan Subway | Following station |
|---|---|---|
| Jamsillaru Next counterclockwise | Line 2 | Jamsilsaenae Next clockwise |
| Mongchontoseong towards Byeollae | Line 8 | Seokchon towards Moran |
Location

Jamsil Station (Korean: 잠실역) is an underground station on Line 2 and Line 8 of the Seoul Metropolitan Subway. Lotte World is continuous with the Line 2 station. The station has the subname Songpa-gu Office (Korean: 송파구청), due to the proximity of the office building (right outside Exit 10 of the Line 8 station).

The Line 2 station is located in Jamsil-dong and the Line 8 station is located in Sincheon-dong. Both neighborhoods are within Songpa District, Seoul.

== Station layout ==
=== Line 2 ===
Jamsilsaenae ↑
Outer | | Inner
↓ Jamsillaru

| Inner circle | ← ● Line 2 Clockwise |
| Outer circle | ● Line 2 Counterclockwise → |

=== Line 8 ===
Mongchontoseong ↑
S/B | | N/B
↓ Seokchon

| Southbound | ← ● Line 8 toward Moran |
| Northbound | ● Line 8 toward Byeollae → |

== Passenger load ==
A survey conducted in 2011 by the Ministry of Land, Infrastructure and Transport on 92 Administrative divisions across the country reported that Jamsil Station is the second-busiest public transit stop after Gangnam station. It is followed by Sadang station, Seolleung station and Sillim station.

In December 2010 the station had the fourth-highest rate of WiFi data consumption of all the Seoul Metropolitan Subway stations, following Express Bus Terminal Station, Sadang station, Dongdaemun station and followed by Jongno 3-ga Station.

In a Seoul Metro analysis in 2024, Jamsil station became the busiest subway station across the Seoul area, surpassing Gangnam station with an average of 155,229 passengers each day on Line 2 over the course of the first four months in 2024.

== Entrance ==
- Exit 1 : Ways to Bangi dong, Songpa district office, Telecom office of Songpa, Olympic Park
- Exit 2 : Songpa highway, Lotte World Tower Avenuel Jamsil, Seokchon Lake
- Exit 4 : Lotte World, Lotte Department Store Jamsil
- Exit 10 : Songpa Gu Office

== Gallery ==
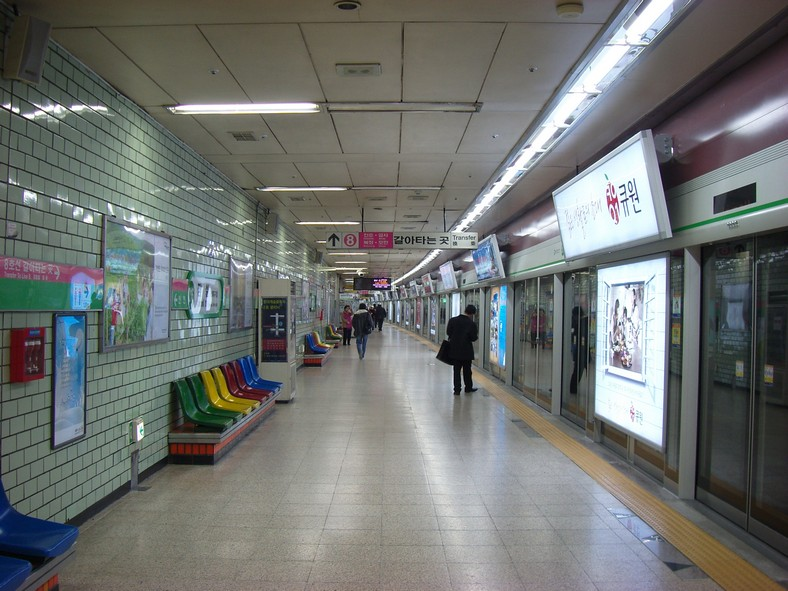

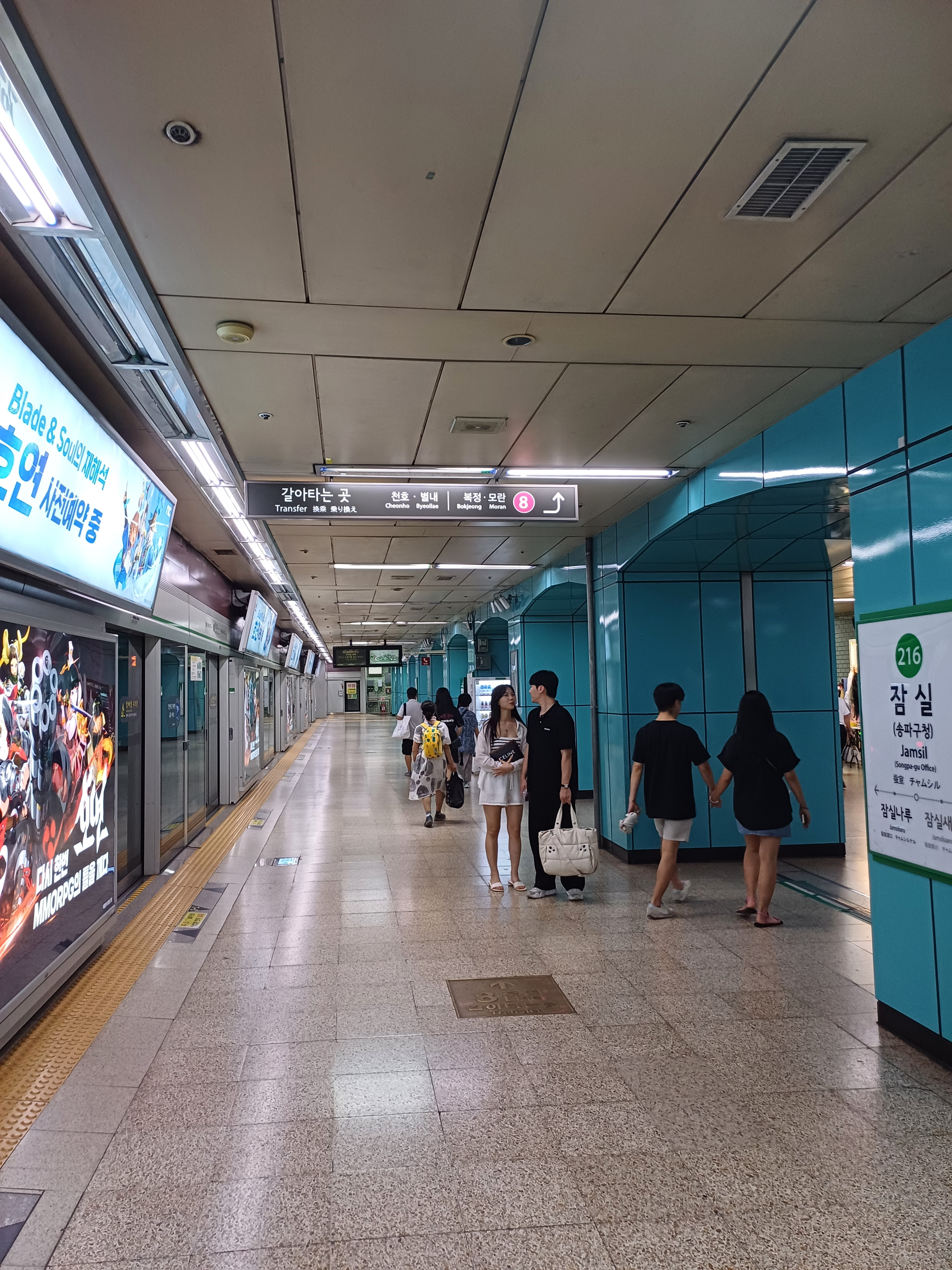
Line 2 platform

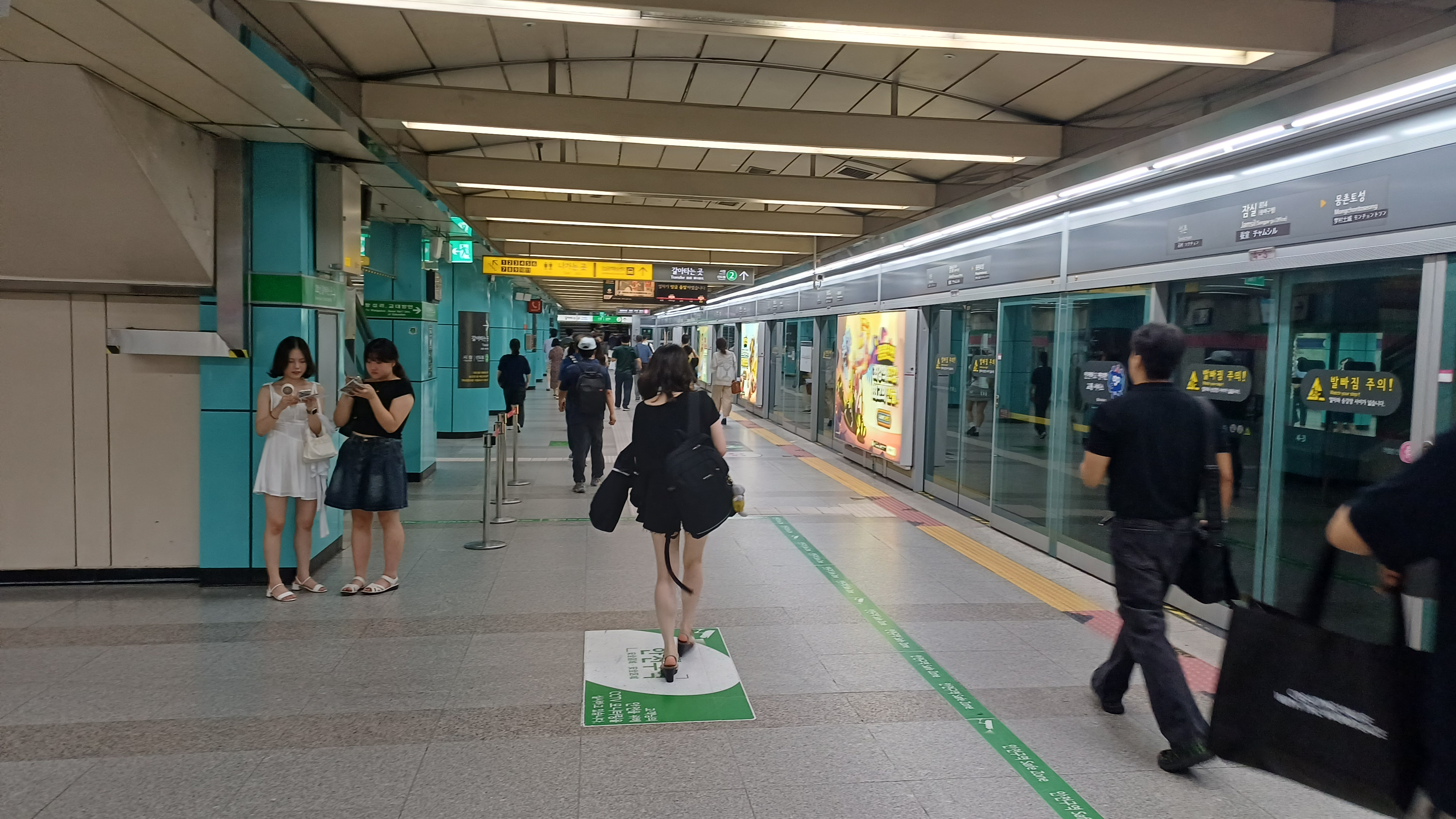
Line 8 platform

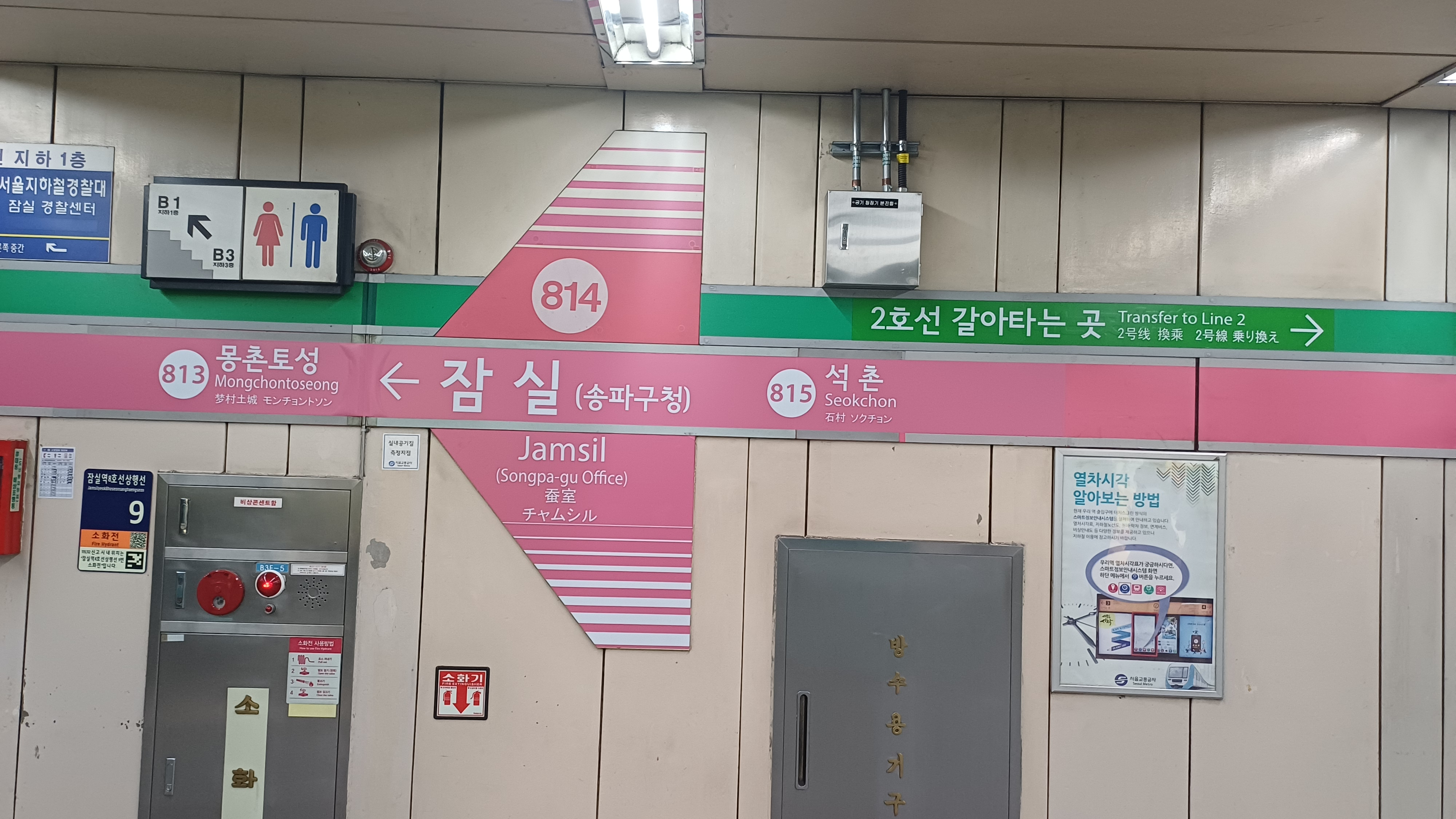
Station sign (Line 8)
