= Jamsillaru station =

Train station in South Korea

잠실나루 (수협중앙회공제보험); Jamsillaru (Suhyup Insurance)
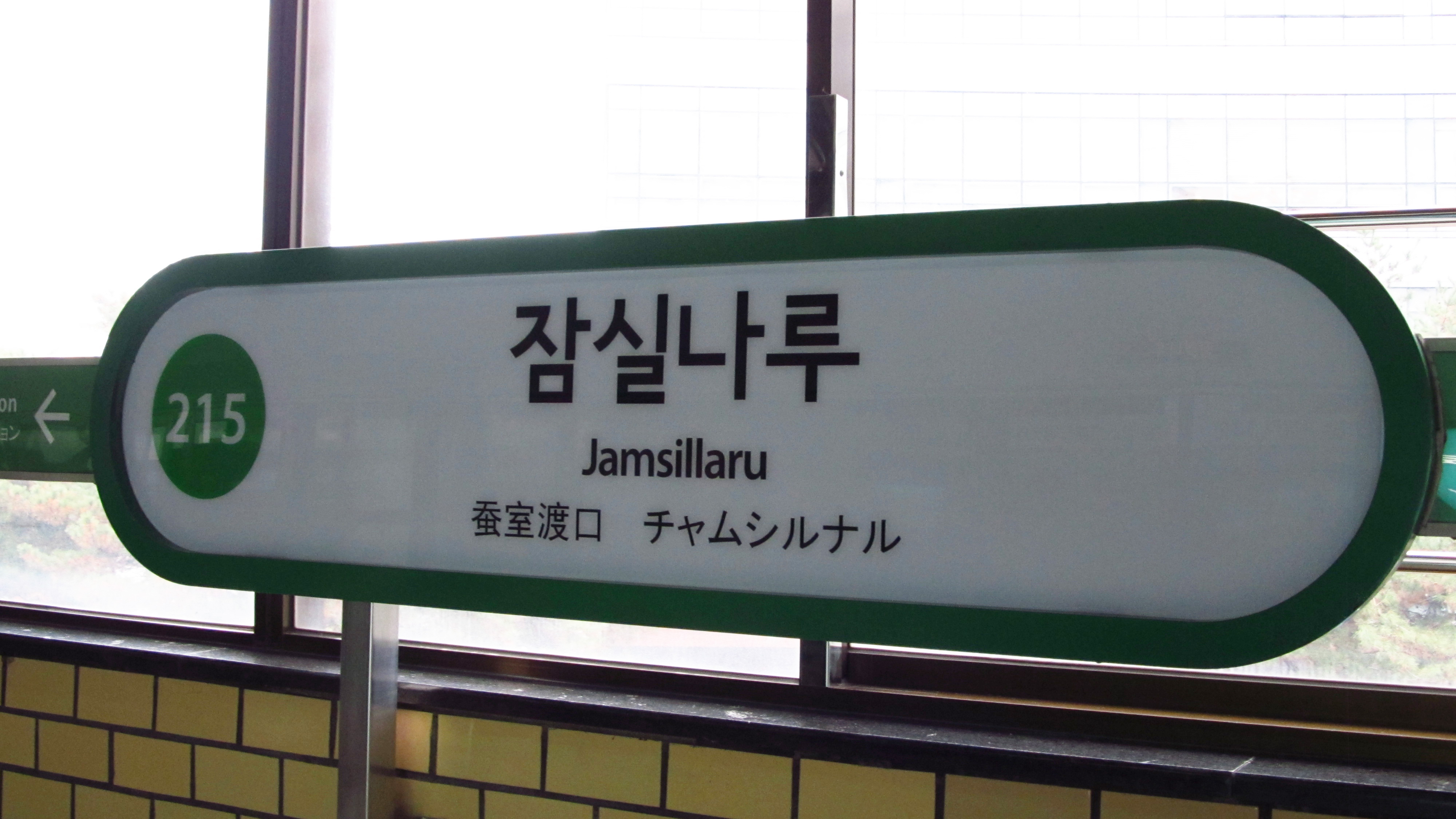

Korean name
- Hangul: 잠실나루역
- Hanja: 蠶室나루驛
- Revised Romanization: Jamsillaru-yeok
- McCune–Reischauer: Chamsillaru-yŏk

General information
- Location: 624 Seongpadae-ro, 1 Sincheon-dong, Songpa-gu, Seoul
- Coordinates: 37°31′13″N 127°06′14″E
- Operator: Seoul Metro
- Line: Line 2
- Platforms: 2
- Tracks: 2

Construction
- Structure type: Aboveground

History
- Opened: October 31, 1980
- Former names: Seongnae

Passengers
- (Daily) Based on Jan-Dec of 2012. Line 2: 36,616

Services
Preceding station	Seoul Metropolitan Subway	Following station
Gangbyeon Next counterclockwise	Line 2	Jamsil Next clockwise
Location

Jamsillaru Station is a station on the Seoul Subway Line 2. Its former name literally means "in the fortress," probably referring to the nearby Mongchon and Pungnap earthen walls, and it was also named from Seongnae-cheon. It is also the closest subway station to the Asan Medical Center.

The station was renamed from "Seongnae" to avoid confusion with the Songnae station.

It is located in Sincheon-dong, Songpa District, Seoul.

== Station layout ==
L2; Platform level	Side platform, doors will open on the right
L2; Platform level	Outer circle	← Line 2 Next counterclockwise (Gangbyeon)
L2; Platform level	Inner circle	Line 2 Next clockwise (Jamsil) →
L2; Platform level	Side platform, doors will open on the right

L1; Concourse	Lobby	Customer Service, Shops, Vending machines, ATMs

G	Street level	Exit

== Vicinity ==
- Exit 1: Jamsil High School, Asan Medical Center, Jamsil Parkrio APT
- Exit 2: Miseong APT, Jinju APT
- Exit 3: Songpa District Office
- Exit 4: Jangmi APT
