= Gangbyeon station =

Train station in South Korea

강변 (동서울터미널); Gangbyeon (Dongseoul Bus Terminal)
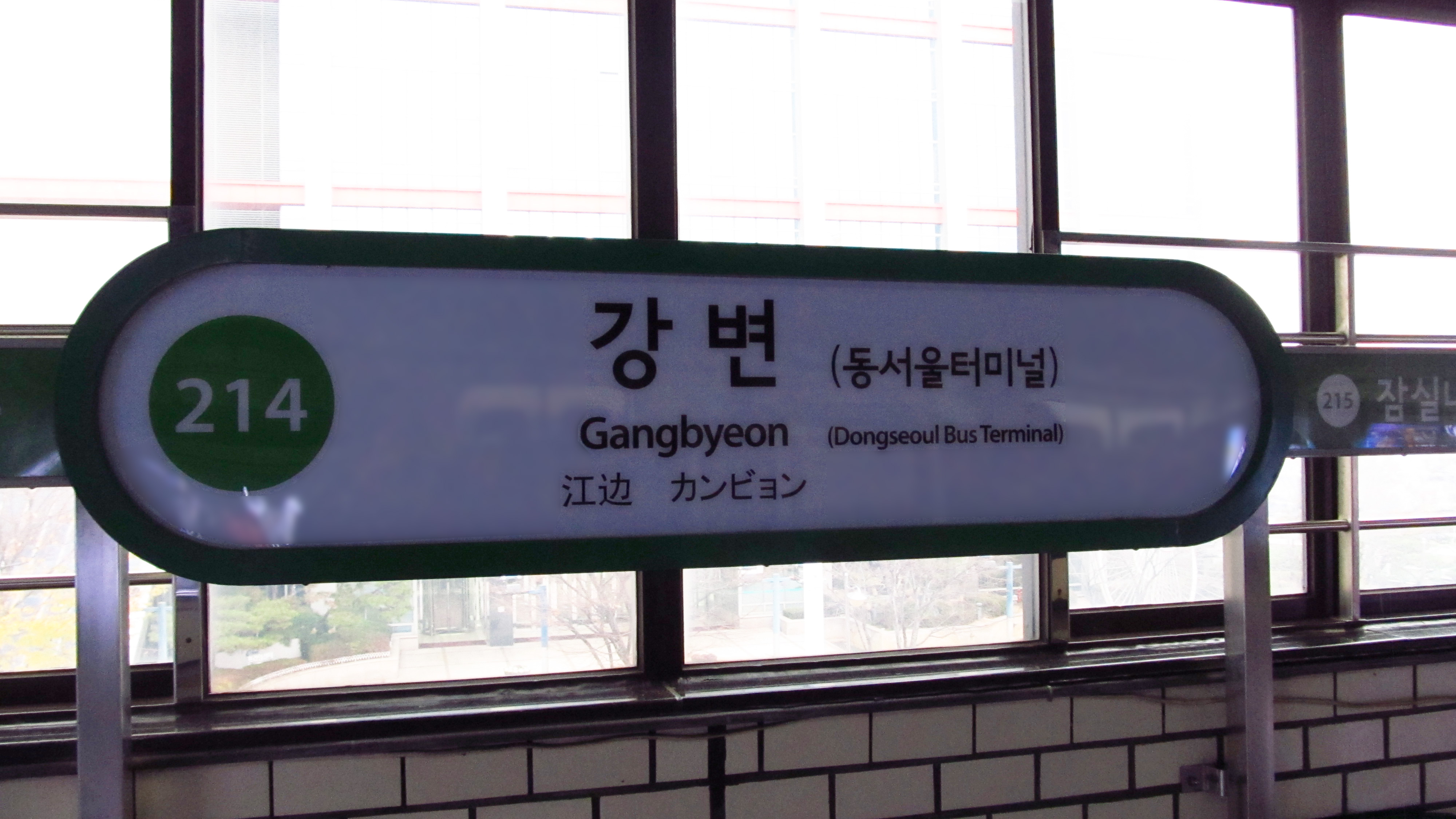
- Station sign

Korean name
- Hangul: 강변역
- Hanja: 江邊驛
- Revised Romanization: Gangbyeonnyeok
- McCune–Reischauer: Kangbyŏnnyŏk

General information
- Location: 53, Gangbyeonyeok-ro, 546-6 Guui 3-dong, Gwangjin-gu, Seoul
- Coordinates: 37°32′06″N 127°05′41″E
- Operator: Seoul Metro
- Line: Line 2
- Platforms: 2
- Tracks: 2
- Connections: East Seoul Intercity Bus Terminal

Construction
- Structure type: Aboveground

History
- Opened: October 31, 1980

Passengers
- (Daily) Based on Jan-Dec of 2012. Line 2: 107,908

Services
Preceding station	Seoul Metropolitan Subway	Following station
Guui Next counterclockwise	Line 2	Jamsillaru Next clockwise
Location

Gangbyeon Station (Korean: 강변역) is a station on the Seoul Subway Line 2. The name of this station literally means "riverside," pertaining to its proximity to the Han River.

== Station layout ==
L2; Platform level	Side platform, doors will open on the right
L2; Platform level	Outer circle	← Line 2 Next counterclockwise (Guui)
L2; Platform level	Inner circle	Line 2 Next clockwise (Jamsillaru) →
L2; Platform level	Side platform, doors will open on the right

L1; Concourse	Lobby	Customer Service, Shops, Vending machines, ATMs

G	Street level	Exit

== Neighborhoods ==
- The escalator at Exit 1 of Gangbyeon Station leads to the Gangbyeon Technomart, which has Lotte Mart, a large supermarket, on the B2 floor, and a movie theater that is the first CGV in the country, on the 9th floor, and a park on the 10th floor where you can overlook the river view of Seoul.
- East Seoul Intercity Bus Terminal (DongSeoul Bus Terminal) via Exit 4
