= Seongsu station =

Train station in South Korea

Coordinates: 37°32′40″N 127°03′22″E

성수 (무신사); Seongsu (MUSINSA)
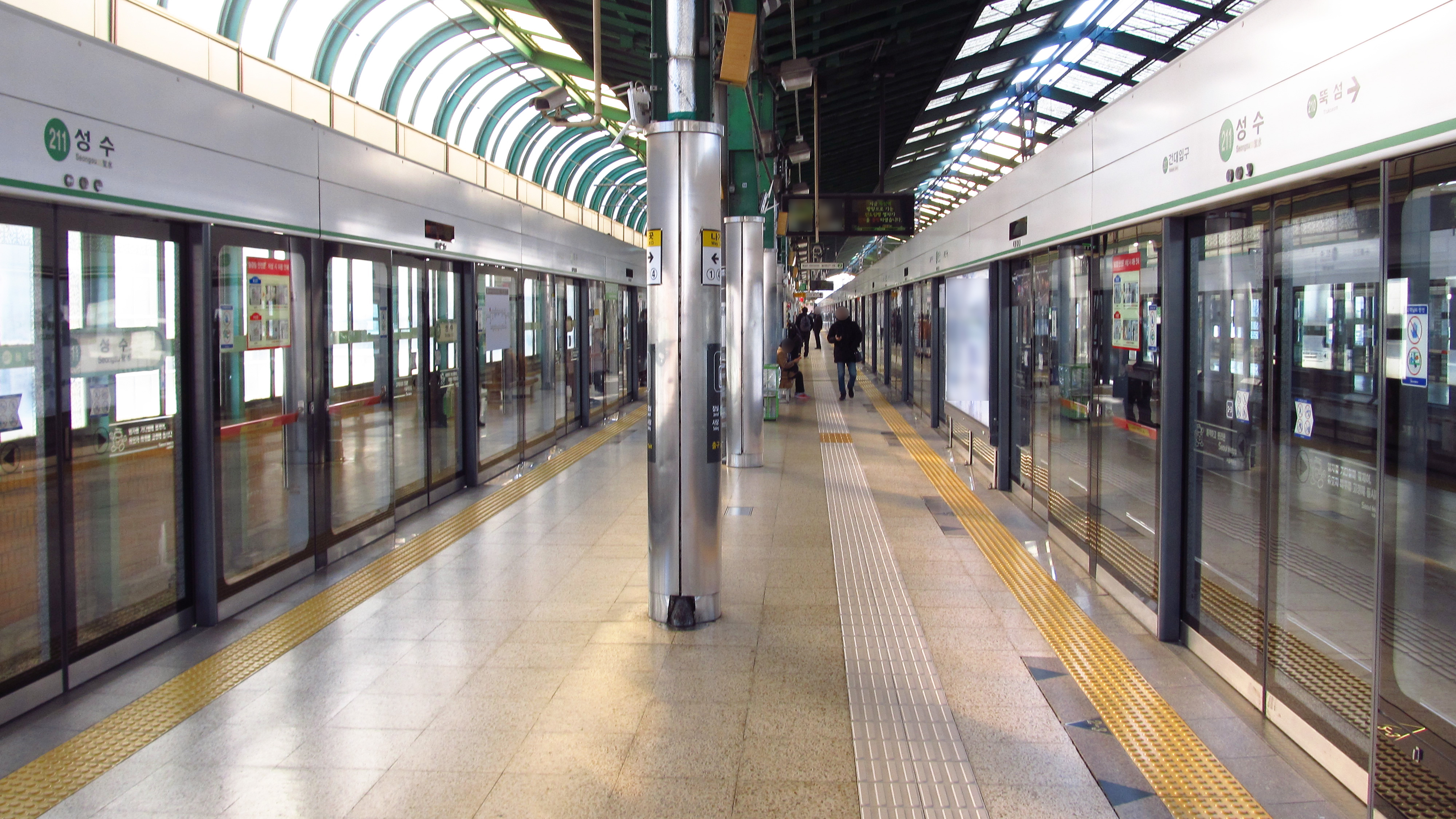

Korean name
- Hangul: 성수역
- Hanja: 聖水驛
- Revised Romanization: Seongsu-yeok
- McCune–Reischauer: Sŏngsu-yŏk

General information
- Location: 100 Achasan-ro, 300-1 Seongsu 2-ga, Seongdong-gu, Seoul
- Operator: Seoul Metro
- Line: Line 2
- Platforms: 2
- Tracks: 4

Construction
- Structure type: aboveground

History
- Opened: October 31, 1980

Passengers
- (Daily) Based on Jan-Dec of 2012. Line 2: 48,909

Services
Preceding station	Seoul Metropolitan Subway	Following station
Ttukseom Next counterclockwise	Line 2	Konkuk University Next clockwise
Terminus	Line 2 Seongsu Branch	Yongdap towards Sinseol-dong
Location

Seongsu Station (Korean: 성수역) is a rapid transit station on Seoul Subway Line 2. It is located in Seongsu-dong in the Seongdong-gu administrative district of Seoul. It is also the southeastern terminus of Line 2's Seongsu Branch to Sinseol-dong. Trains needing to be serviced take the Seongsu Branch from this station and go to the Gunja Train Depot behind Yongdap Station.

The platform is elevated and features 4 tracks. The main circle route of Line 2 runs on the inside pair of tracks while the Sinseol-dong branch is served by the outside pair of tracks. The station has four exits and is connected to two bus routes as well as a local shuttle bus which services the various apartment complexes in the area around the station. The stations services Seongsu 1ga 1 dong, Seongsu 2ga 1 dong, and Seongsu 2ga 3 dong. The area around the station is primarily commercial and light industrial but gives way to mixed-use development and residential further from station. Exits 1 and 2 service a nearby Lotte Castle apartment complex.

== History ==
The station is part of the original set of stations which made up the first phase of Line 2. It was built on October 31, 1980, at the intersection of Guui Road (구의로) and Seong-Sam Road (성삼길). The initial section of Line 2 ran from Sinseol-dong to the Sports Complex in Jamsil-dong. In 1983 Seongsu Station was split as the Line 2 circle was extended by nine stations to Euljiro 1(il)-ga. The Sinseol-dong line became known as a branch line at this time. It would be another eight months before the circle line was completed in May 1984.

== Facilities ==
The station is an elevated platform with 2 islands. The exits on the station are paired at either end of the station. They are not separated by ticket gates which allows passengers and pedestrians to walk the full length of the station. The station features several small shops, including convenience stores, clothing shops, and other variety stores. There are washroom facilities in the middle of the main concourse.

One block from exits 1 and 2 is the Seongsu Lotte Castle luxury apartment complex. This complex contains several residential apartment towers, as well as small shops and park facilities for children and residents. Past the Lotte Castle is a riverfront park area which is situated on a small branch of the Han River the branch runs east briefly and then turns north at Hwayang-dong.

Within 200 meters from all exits there are several small community parks including Seongsu Green Park and Hyanglim Park.

Exits 3 and 4 service mainly mixed-use residential and commercial buildings as well as the Seongsu E-mart which is adjacent to the Seongsu 2ga 1 dong resident center.

== Station layout ==
L2; Platform level	Branch line northbound	← Line 2 Seongsu Branch toward Sinseol-dong (Yongdap)
L2; Platform level	Island platform, doors will open on the left, right
L2; Platform level	Outer circle	← Line 2 Next counterclockwise (Ttukseom)
L2; Platform level	Inner circle	Line 2 Next clockwise (Konkuk University) →
L2; Platform level	Island platform, doors will open on the left, right
L2; Platform level	Branch line southbound	Line 2 Seongsu Branch Alighting passengers only →

L1; Concourse	Lobby	Customer Service, Shops, Vending machines, ATMs

G	street level	Exit

== Service ==
The Line 2 circle route and Seongsu Branch Line are both operated by Seoul Metro at this station. They are serviced through the same pair of island platforms. The subway runs with varying headways depending on the time of day. During rush hour it can come as often as every 3 minutes and in non-peak times it can be as infrequent as every 18 minutes. It takes an equal amount of time in either direction to reach Sindaebang Station on Line 2 from Seongsu Station making it the mid-way point on the opposite side of the loop.

Passengers can transfer directly between a branch line and circle route train if they arrive on the same platform or they can take the stairs down and transfer to the other platform if required without leaving the ticket gates.

Only exits 1, 3, and 4 are connected to the two bus routes which service the station. Passengers can transfer to either the Green Line 2224, which goes to Guui-dong or 2413 which runs service to Gaepo-dong. The local shuttle bus runs a small route around Seongsu to deliver passengers to various residential areas.

== Average daily ridership ==
Line	Passengers								
Line	2000	2001	2002	2003	2004	2005	2006	2007	2008
Line 2	19468	19851	20742	20661	22966	21839	21387	21249	20789
