= Giant Digger =

Steel roller coaster in South Korea

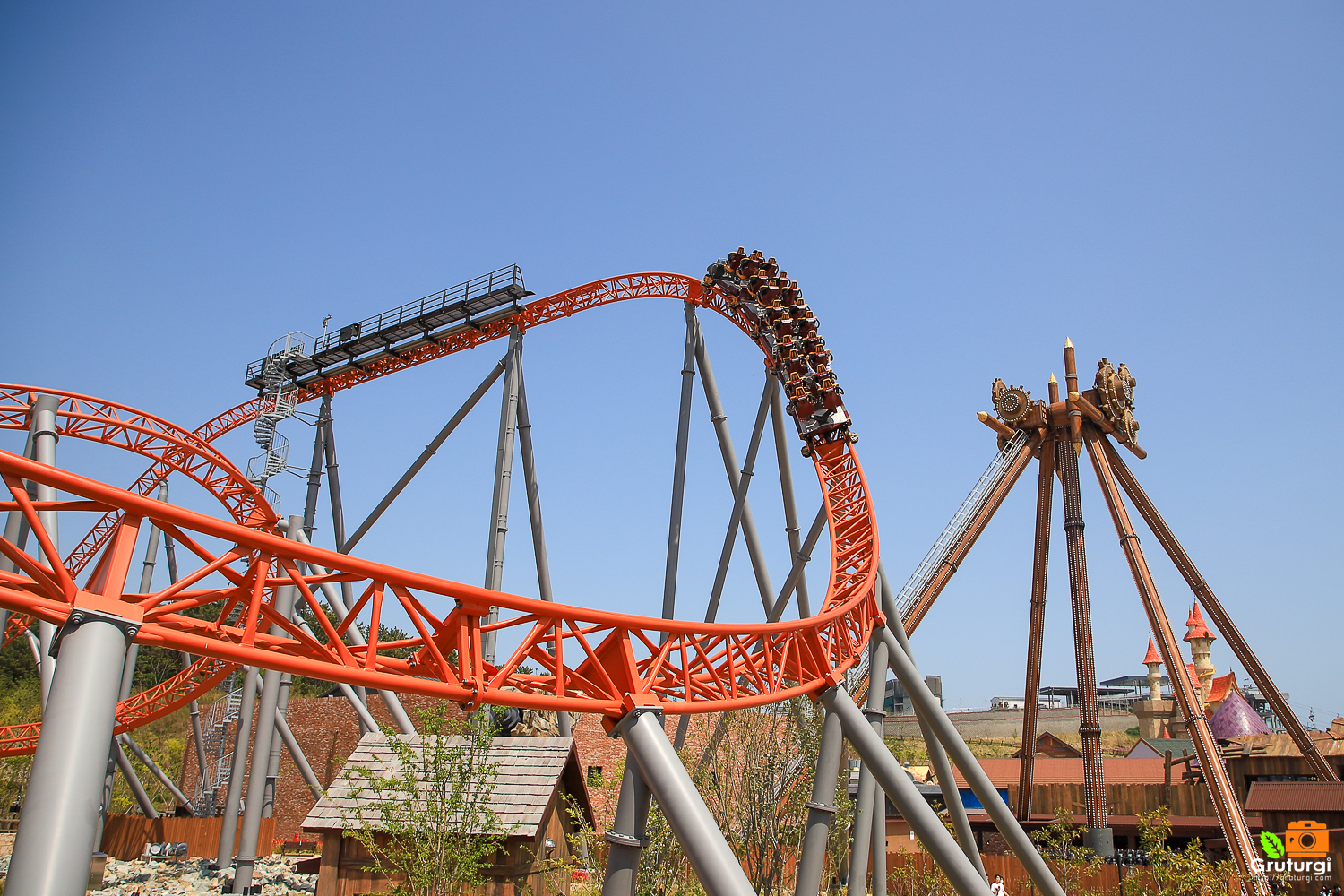

Lotte World Adventure Busan
- Location: Lotte World Adventure Busan
- Coordinates: 35°11′50.4″N 129°12′47.5″E
- Status: Operating
- Opening date: March 31, 2022

General statistics
- Type: Steel
- Manufacturer: Mack Rides
- Model: Launch Coaster / Blue Fire
- Lift/launch system: LSM Launch
- Height: 124.7 ft (38.0 m)
- Length: 3,464.6 ft (1,056.0 m)
- Speed: 62.1 mph (99.9 km/h)
- Inversions: 4
- Duration: 2 min 30 sec
- Capacity: 830 riders per hour
- G-force: 3.8
- Trains: 2 trains with 5 cars. Riders are arranged 2 across in 2 rows for a total of 20 riders per train.
- Giant Digger at RCDB

Giant Digger (Korean: 자이언트 디거) is a steel linear synchronous motor (LSM) launched roller coaster located in Lotte World Adventure Busan, South Korea, built by Mack Rides. Lotte World Adventure Busan began construction in May 2019, and Giant Digger was supposed to open alongside the park in May 2021. However, the coaster was delayed 3 months until August 2021, then further delayed until March 2022 due to delays in manufacturing and safety testing as well as COVID-19 pandemic related risks. On March 31, 2022, Giant Digger opened to the public alongside Lotte World Adventure Busan itself. The coaster is located in the Underground Zone area of the park, which is themed around a mining town where ogres live. Giant Digger is the longest steel coaster in South Korea and also has the second most inversions overall in South Korea tied with Rolling-X Train and Thunderbolt. It is also the second fastest steel coaster and the third fastest overall, as well as the fourth tallest steel coaster and fifth tallest overall in South Korea.

== History ==
Plans for the construction of Lotte World Adventure Busan started during May 2019. On March 2, 2021, it was revealed by Osiria Theme Park Development Group that Lotte World Adventure Busan would contain 31 different rides and entertainment facilities including Giant Digger on opening. It was also revealed during the same date that the opening date of Lotte World Adventure Busan was delayed 3 months from its initial opening date in May 2021 to August 2021 due to risks related to the COVID-19 pandemic. Lotte World Adventure Busan's opening and Giant Digger's launch was further delayed to March 2022 due to not only COVID-related risks but also initial delays in manufacturing and additional significant delays in the arrival of engineers from overseas for safety testing. On February 25, 2022, it was confirmed by Lotte World Adventure Busan staff that the park and the coaster would open on March 31, 2022. The coaster would open to the public during March 31, 2022 alongside Lotte World Adventure Busan under a 6,000 visitor limit per day due to concerns about the COVID-19 pandemic.

== Ride experience ==
Giant Digger starts with the train going into a tunnel, then using an linear synchronous motor for its initial large overbanked turn to the right. Next, it does a vertical loop and a small overbanked turn the left. Then, it goes up slightly and stays for a while, then goes down, performs a twisted horseshoe roll followed by a small camelback then tilts to the right. Afterwards, the coaster goes through an in-line twist that is followed by a left turn back into the station.

Giant Digger is located in the Underland Zone area of the park, which is themed around a mining town where ogres live. The entrance and exit of the coaster is decorated to simulate a jewel mine, and there are depictions of Lorry, one of the theme park's mascots, going on a mining trail with ogres in the inside walls of the waiting area.

== Characteristics ==
Giant Digger is the longest steel roller coaster in South Korea and the second longest overall roller coaster in South Korea, with a length of 1,056.0 m (3,464.6 ft). It is also the fourth tallest steel roller coaster and the fifth tallest overall, at 124.7 ft (38.0 m) tall. Furthermore, it has the second most inversions of all roller coasters in South Korea with 4 inversions, tied with Rolling-X Train and Thunderbolt (Masan Robot Land). Giant Digger is the second fastest steel and the third fastest overall coaster in South Korea, with a speed of 99.9 km/h (62.1 mph).
