= Lotte World Adventure Busan =

Theme park in Busan, South Korea

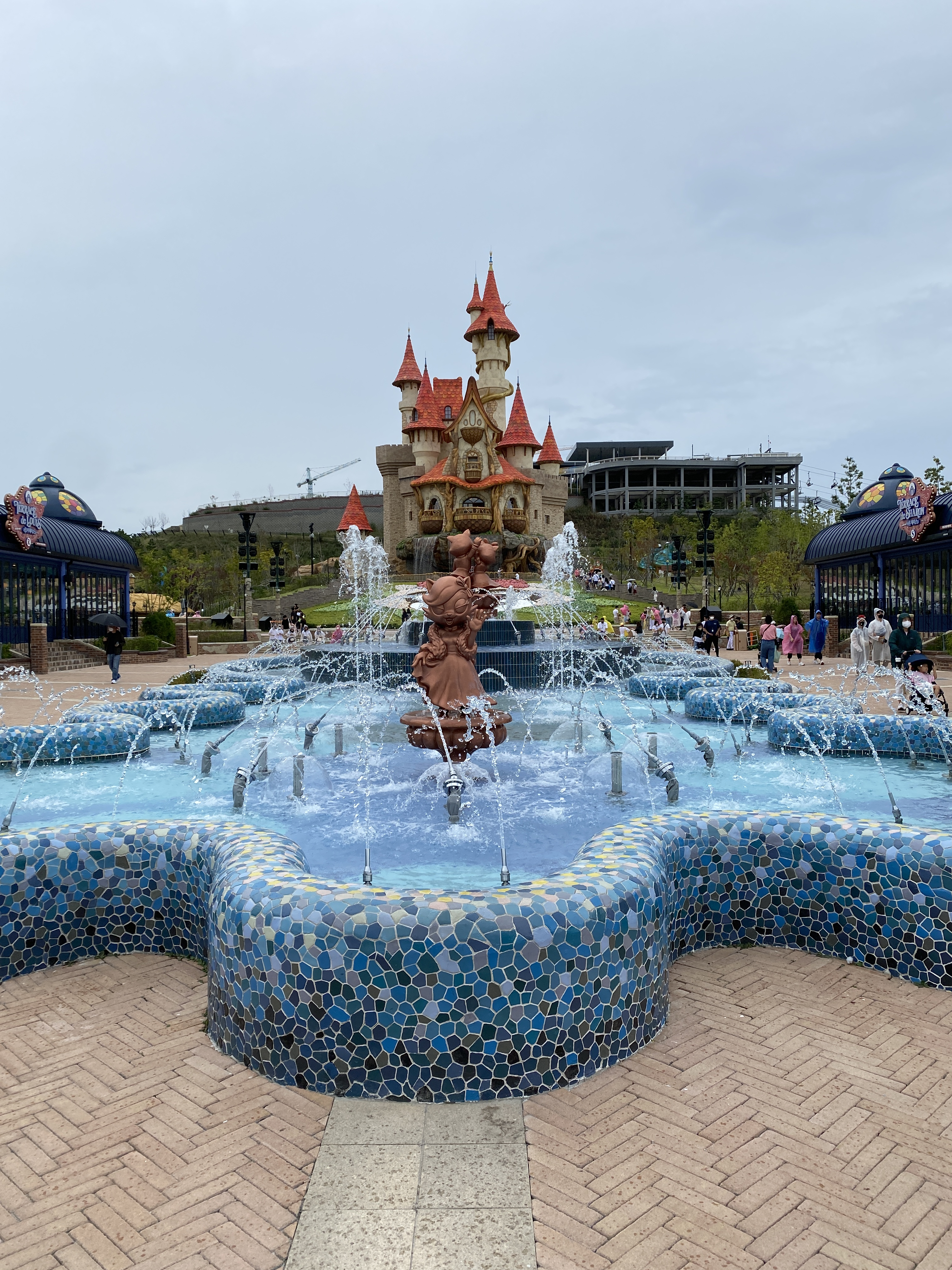
- Lotte World
- Interactive map of Lotte World Adventure Busan
- Location: Gijang County, Busan, South Korea
- Coordinates: 35°11′47″N 129°12′54″E
- Status: Operating
- Opened: March 31, 2022
- Owner: Lotte Corporation
- Operating season: Year-round

Attractions
- Roller coasters: F
- Website: www.adventurebusan.lotteworld.com/kor/main/index.do/

- Lotte World Adventure Busan
- Hangul: 롯데월드 어드벤처 부산
- RR: Rotde woldeu eodeubencheo Busan
- MR: Rotte wŏldŭ ŏdŭbench'ŏ Pusan

Lotte World Adventure Busan (Korean: 롯데월드 어드벤처 부산) is a theme park in Gijang County, Busan, South Korea. It opened in March 2022.

== See also ==
- Giant Digger
- Lotte World
