= Guui station =

Train station in South Korea

Coordinates: 37°32′17″N 127°05′09″E

구의 (광진구청); Guui (Gwangjin-gu Office)
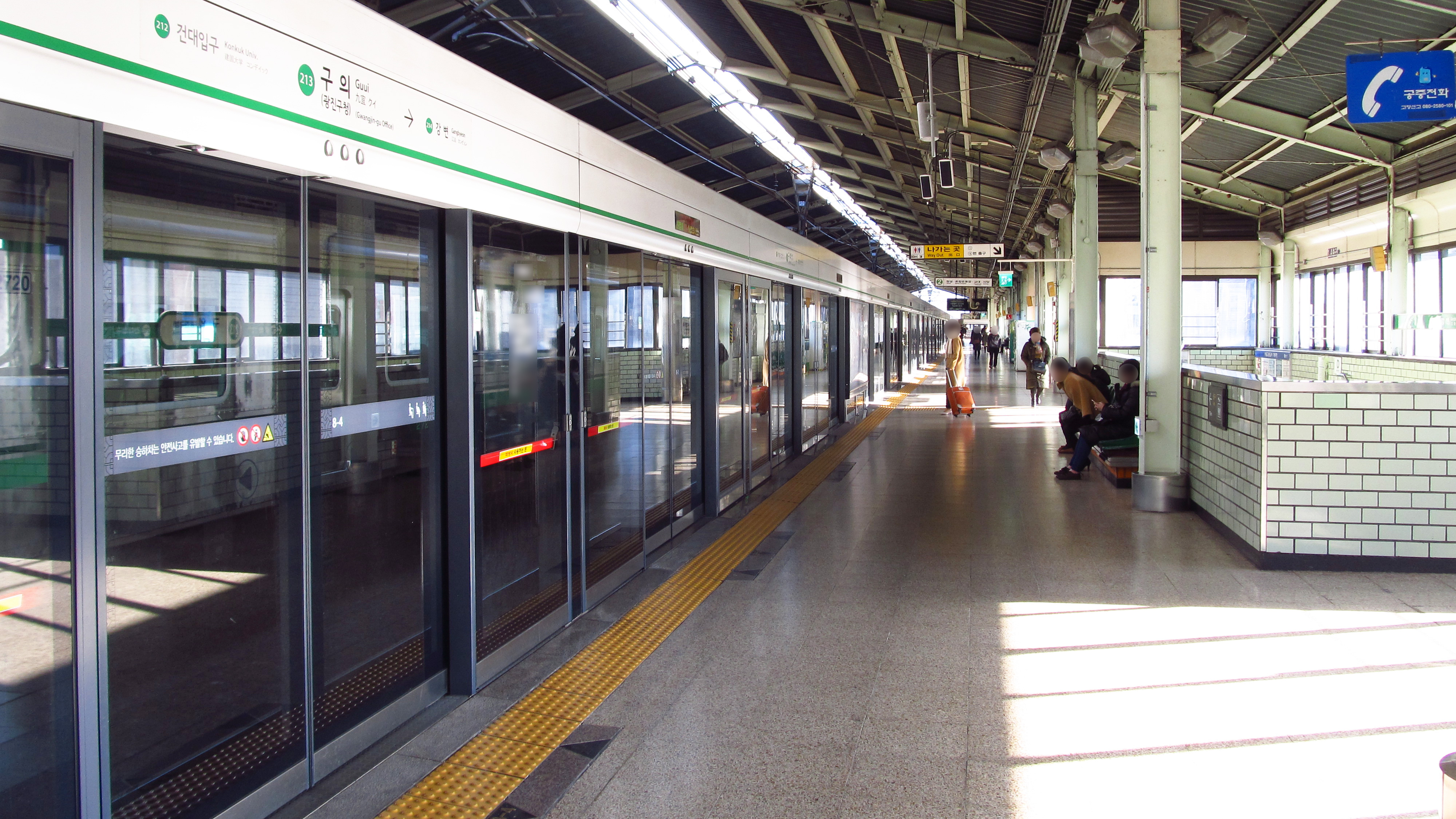

Korean name
- Hangul: 구의역
- Hanja: 九宜驛
- Revised Romanization: Guui-yeok
- McCune–Reischauer: Kuŭi-yŏk

General information
- Location: 384-1 Achasan-ro, 245-24 Guui 1-dong, Gwangjin-gu, Seoul
- Operator: Seoul Metro
- Line: Line 2
- Platforms: 2
- Tracks: 2

Construction
- Structure type: Aboveground

History
- Opened: October 31, 1980

Passengers
- (Daily) Based on Jan-Dec of 2012. Line 2: 48,278

Services
Preceding station	Seoul Metropolitan Subway	Following station
Konkuk University Next counterclockwise	Line 2	Gangbyeon Next clockwise
Location

Guui Station (Korean: 구의역) is a station on the Seoul Subway Line 2. Because of its proximity to the Gwangjin District Office (close to exit number 1), it has the subname Gwangjin-gu Office.

== Station layout ==
L2; Platform level	Side platform, doors will open on the right-hand side
L2; Platform level	Outer circle	← Line 2 Next counterclockwise (Konkuk University)
L2; Platform level	Inner circle	Line 2 Next clockwise (Gangbyeon) →
L2; Platform level	Side platform, doors will open on the right-hand side

L1; Concourse	Lobby	Customer Service, Shops, Vending machines, ATMs

G	Street level	Exit

== Incident ==
- Guui Station Screen Door Death Accident
