= Edae (area) =

Neighborhood of Seoul, South Korea

- neighborhood
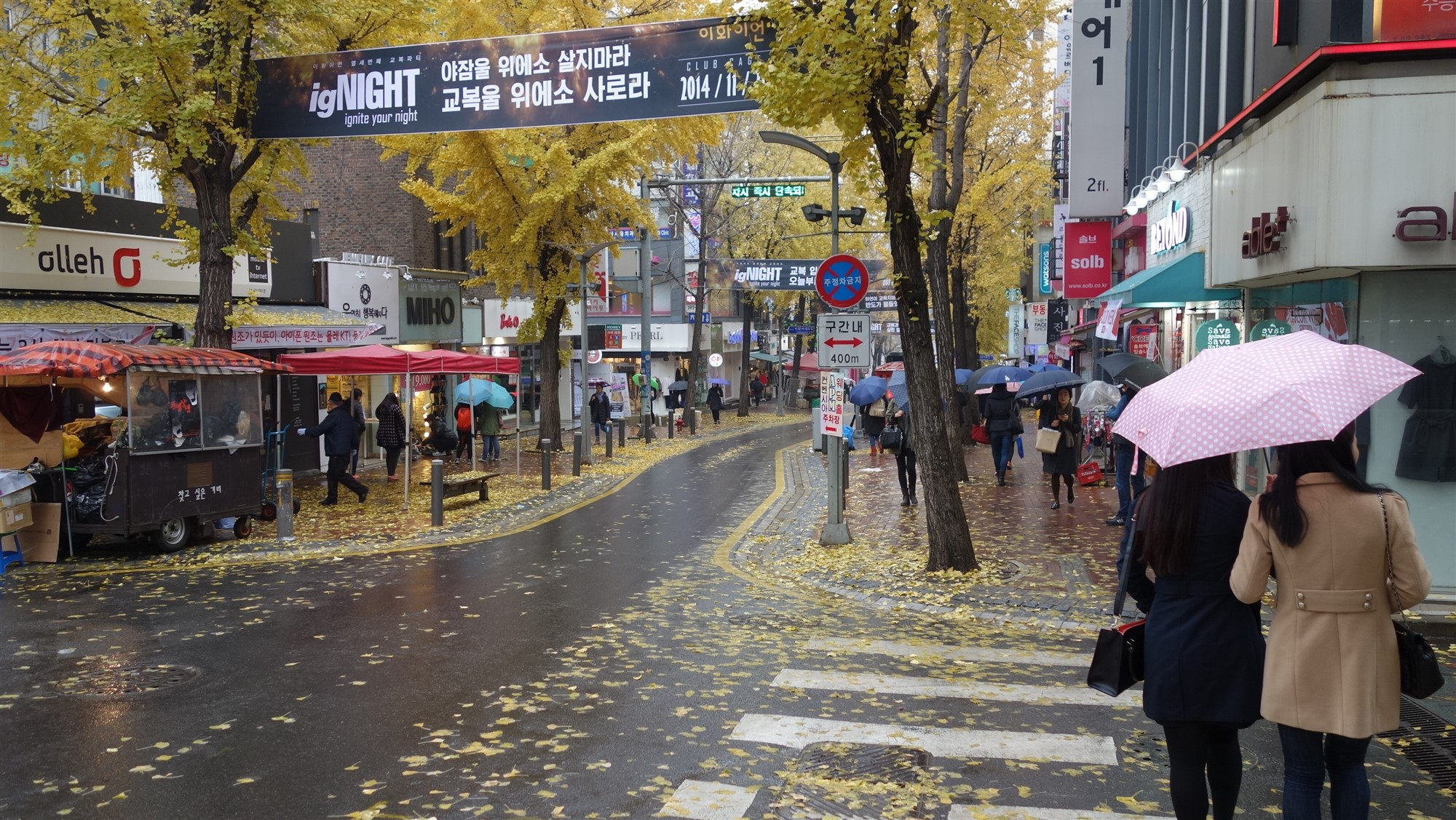
- Ewhayeodae-gil
- Country: South Korea
- Region: Seoul
- District: Seodaemun District

Korean name
- Hangul: 이대
- Hanja: 梨大
- RR: Idae
- MR: Idae

Edae (Korean: 이대) is a neighborhood in Seodaemun District, Seoul, South Korea. It is a popular shopping district for tourists and students of Ewha Womans University. Like Hongdae, the nearby university serves as a metonym for the area. Edae is full of budget-friendly shopping outlets and trendy clothing stores.

The Edae area is accessed via the Ewha Womans University Station on the Seoul Subway Line 2, also known as the green line. Many of the shops in the area cater to Ewha's female students specifically. The neighboring Sinchon is better known for nightlife.

== Attractions ==
Edae's popularity as a shopping district began in the 1980s. In addition to affordable shopping, the area also had trendy cafes. Korea's first Starbucks was opened in 1985, on Ewhayeodae Street, which is the main street that leads from subway station to the entrance to the university.

The Ewha campus draws tourists by the thousands daily for selfies in front of The Campus Valley, which was built in 2008 and designed by Dominique Perrault. In addition to domestic tourism, Edae sees a number of international tourists, particularly women from China, "Japan, Taiwan, the United States, Hong Kong, Vietnam, Thailand, the Philippines, the Russian Federation, and Indonesia."

Popular street food on Ewhayeodae Street includes tteokbokki, as well as Japanese snacks such as takoyaki and taiyaki. In 2018, the city government cracked down on illegal street food vendors in Edae, mainly for operating without a license, but also citations of unsanitary conditions, cooking fuel hazards, boosting excessive foot-traffic, and as unfair competition to legal storefronts. Sinchon Boxquare was built as an alternate venue for street food vendors in the area.
