= Konkuk University station =

Rapid transit station on Seoul Subway Line 2 and Seoul Subway Line 7

Coordinates: 37°32′24″N 127°04′11″E

건대입구; Konkuk Univ.
건대입구; Konkuk Univ.
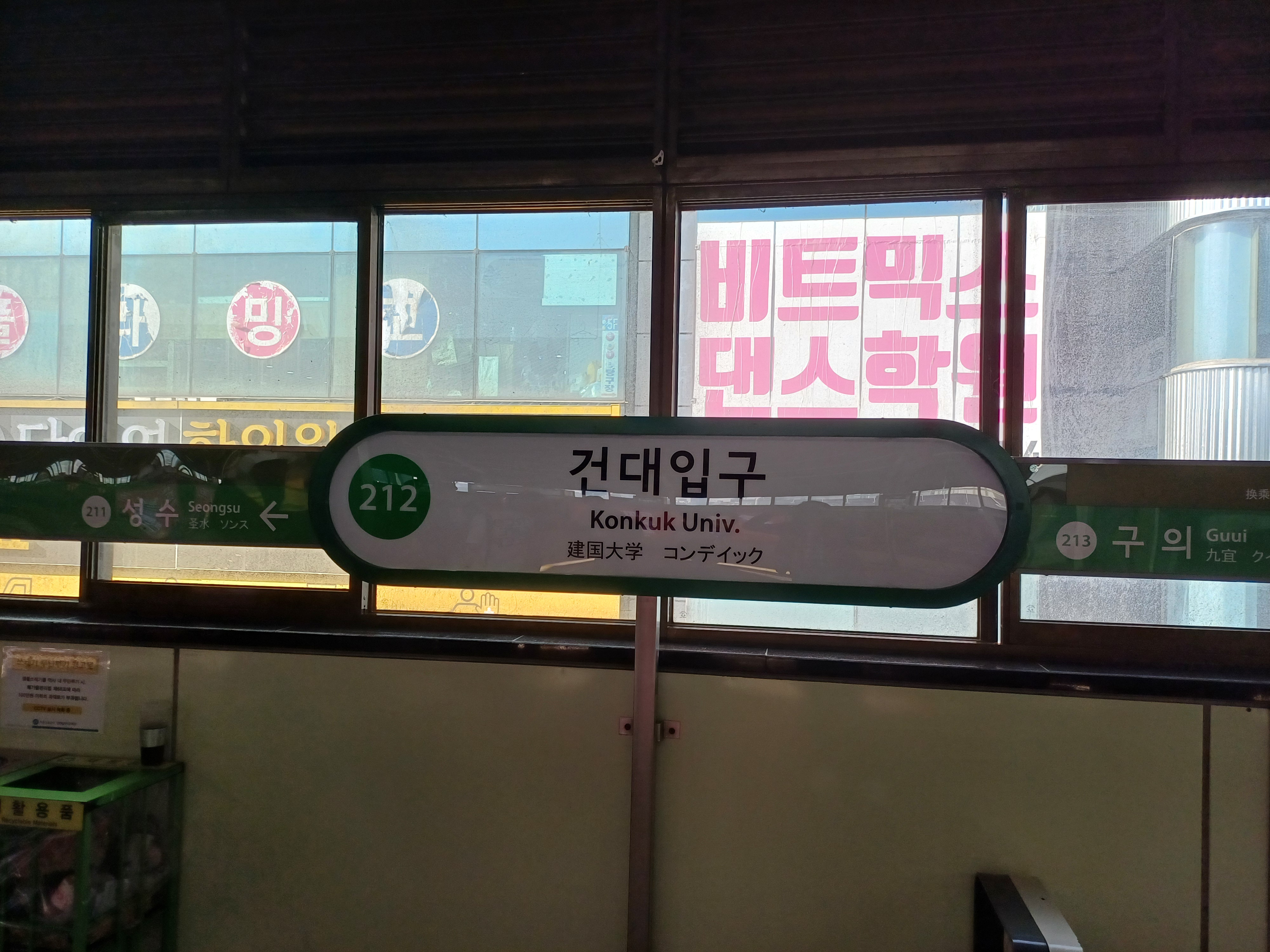
- Station nameplate (Line 2)

Korean name
- Hangul: 건대입구역
- Hanja: 建大入口驛
- Revised Romanization: Geondaeipgu-yeok
- McCune–Reischauer: Kŏndaeipku-yŏk

General information
- Location: 243 Achasan-ro, 7-3 Hwayang-dong, Gwangjin-gu, Seoul
- Operator: Seoul Metro
- Lines: Line 2 Line 7
- Platforms: 4
- Tracks: 4
- Bus routes: 240 721; 2016 2222 2223 2224 3217 3220 4212; 8133; 102; 6013

Key dates
- October 31, 1980: Line 2 opened
- October 11, 1996: Line 7 opened

Passengers
- (Daily) Based on Jan-Dec of 2012. Line 2: 91,989; Line 7: 38,877

Services
Preceding station	Seoul Metropolitan Subway	Following station
Seongsu Next counterclockwise	Line 2	Guui Next clockwise
Children's Grand Park towards Jangam	Line 7	Jayang towards Seongnam
Location

Konkuk University Station (Korean: 건대입구역) is a rapid transit station on Seoul Subway Line 2 and Seoul Subway Line 7. It is located in Hwayang-dong in the Gwangjin-gu administrative district of Seoul. It is adjacent to Konkuk University from which it takes its name. Line 2 is serviced by an elevated platform while Line 7 is serviced by an underground platform. The station has connections to ten bus lines through its six exits as well as a connection to the airport shuttle bus. The station services Hwayang-dong as well as Jayang-dong and Noyu-dong. The area around the station is mixed residential and small commercial businesses. Exits from the underground Line 7 platform open into Konkuk University and the adjacent Star City shopping and high-rise residential tower complex.

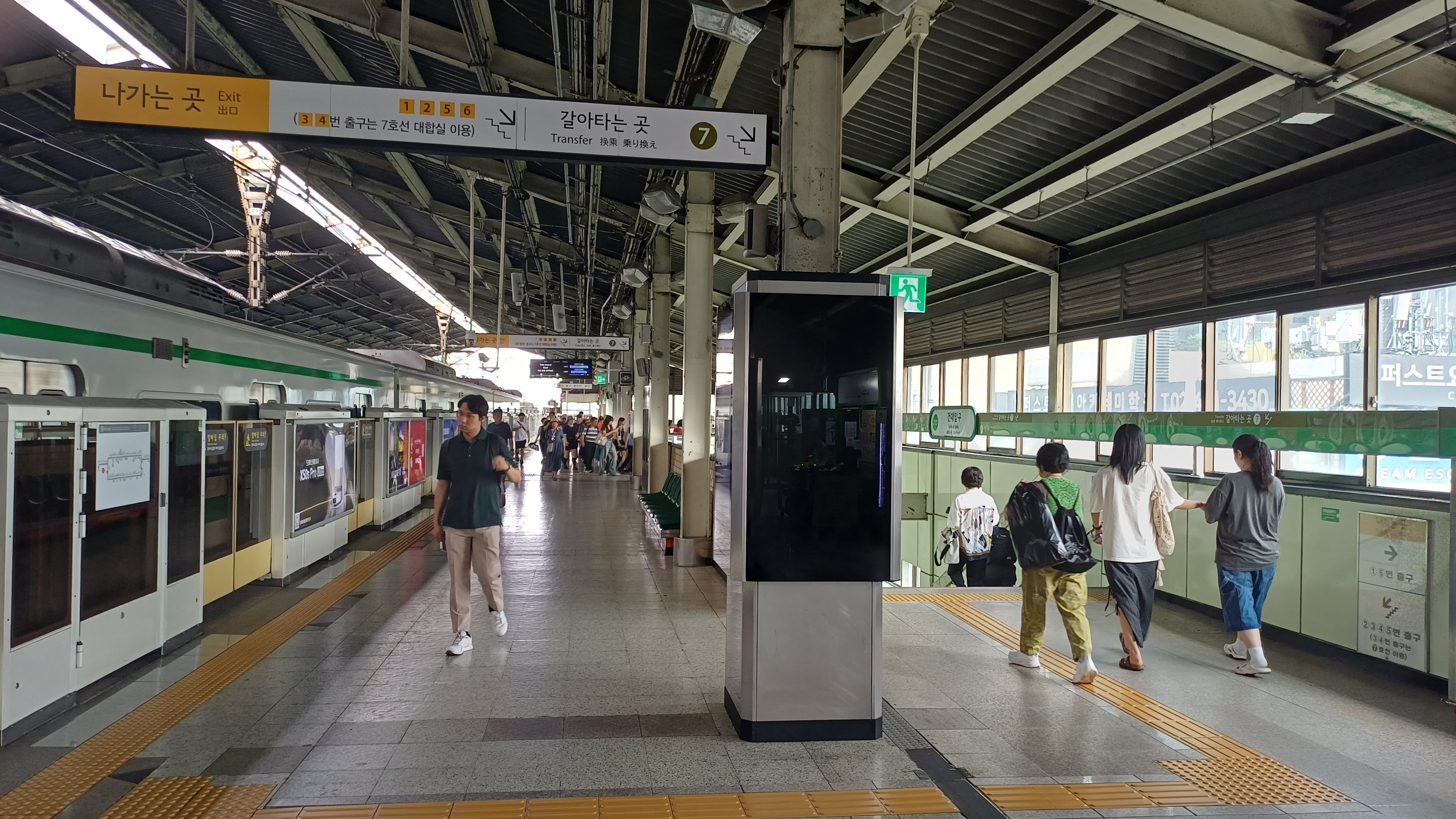
Line 2 platform

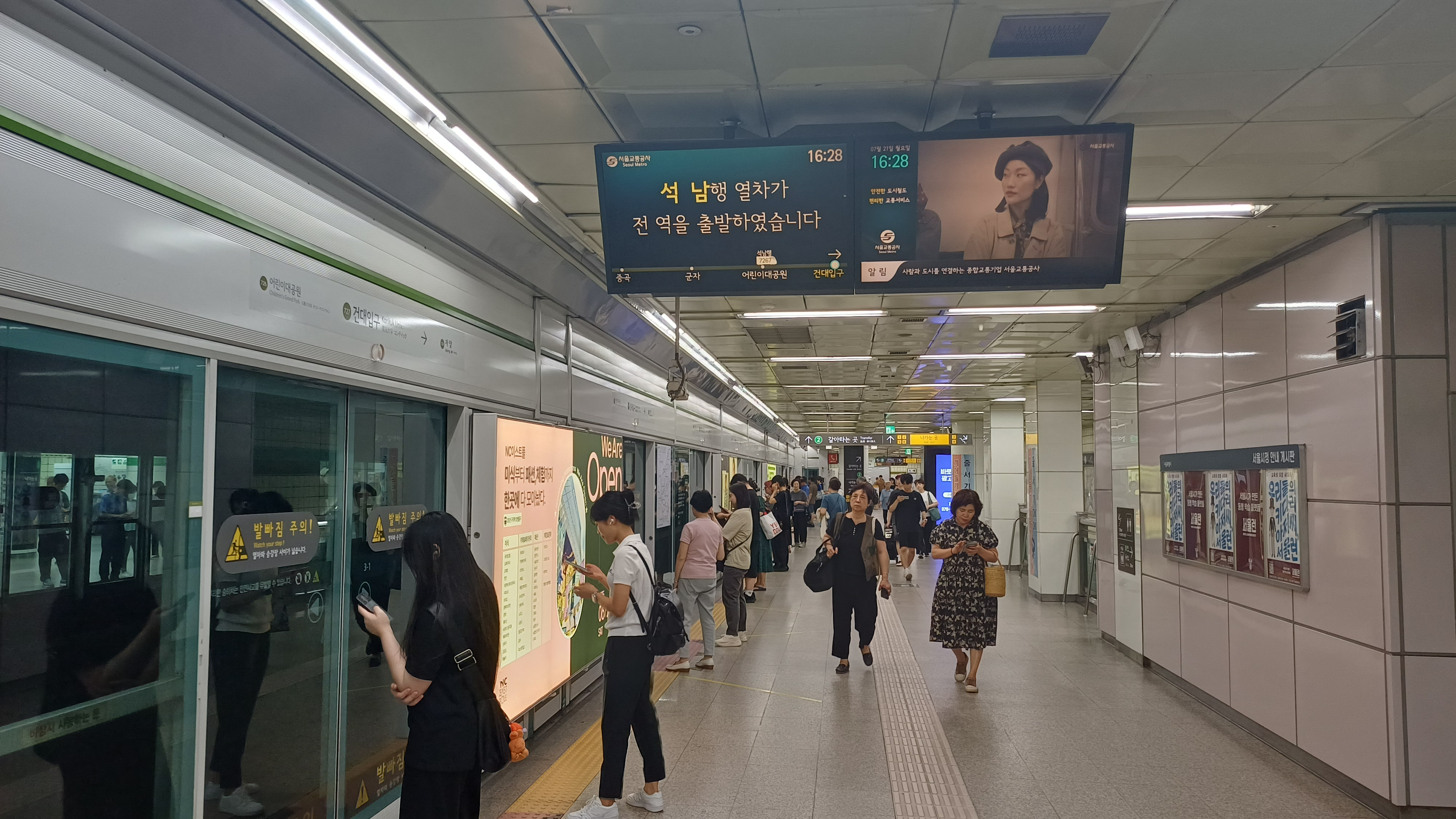
Line 7 platform

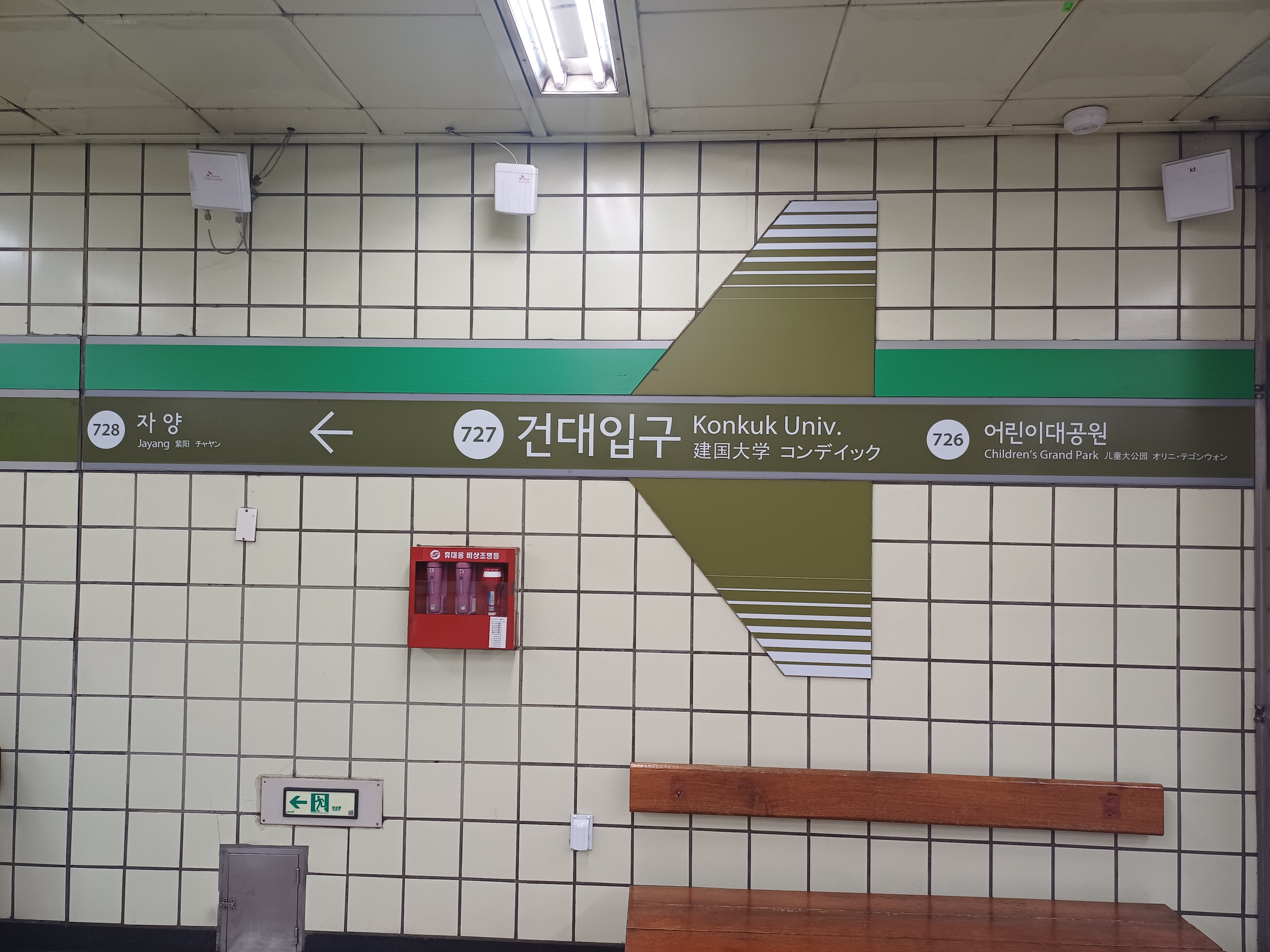
Station nameplate (Line 7)

== Station layout ==
=== Line 2 ===
Seongsu ↑
Inner | | Outer
↓ Guui

Outer circle	← ● Line 2 Counterclockwise
Inner circle	● Line 2 Clockwise →

=== Line 7 ===
Children's Grand Park ↑
S/B | | N/B
↓ Jayang

Northbound	← ● Line 7 toward Jangam
Southbound	● Line 7 toward Seongnam →

== History ==
The station is part of the original set of stations which made up the first phase of Line 2. It was built on October 31, 1980 at Konkuk University intersection and originally called Hwayang Station. The initial section of Line 2 ran from Sinseol-Dong to the Sports Complex station in Jamsil-dong. On March 7, 1985 the station's name was changed from Hwayang to Konkuk University station. Line 7 was joined with Line 2 at this station on October 11, 1996. Star City, a residential and shopping complex, was finished in October 2008 with the opening of the Lotte Department Store. As part of the development an underground exit was built between the Line 7 platform and complex. It was opened on July 25, 2009. It links the areas without requiring passengers to cross the street and will house several shops.

== Facilities ==
The station features both an elevated with a roof and an underground platform. It is constructed from concrete, steel and aluminum. There are four exits from the elevated platform and they are paired at either end of the station. The underground platform has a single pair of exits located in the middle of the Jangam side. There are no exits on the Onsu side of the Line 7 platform requiring passengers to either take an escalator to the elevated platform or use a tunnel to cross to the Jangam side. All the pairs of exits are separated by automatic ticket gates. The station itself features several small retail stores selling cosmetics, undergarments, and cell phones. There is also a pharmacy, a variety store and 7-Eleven convenience store. Seoul Metro occasionally sponsors music performances that take place inside the ticket gates of the elevated platform.

Connected to exits 3 and 4 on the north-east corner of Konkuk University intersection is Konkuk University and Konkuk University Medical Center. Currently under construction is a Young Zone entertainment and shopping complex.

Opposite the university on the south-east side of the intersection is the Star City shopping and residential complex. This complex contains a shopping mall, cinema, parking garage, small outdoor stage, and several residential high rises. Next to Star City is the Naru Arts Center. In the first half of 2009 Line 2's ridership increased. The Star City mall was noted as a being a major contributor to this increase.

The exits attached to the elevated platform serve both Noyu-dong and Hwayang-dong directly as the road that runs underneath the station serves as a border between the two areas. These areas are mixed residential and commercial with the areas immediately around the subway exits being predominantly small shops and businesses and giving way to more residential as the distance from the station and main roads increases. Exit #1 features the only elevator that can be used to access the station and is attached to the only other high rise in the area. It is also a mixed-use building known in South Korea as an officetel.

== Service ==
Line 2 and 7 of Seoul Metropolitan Subway both operate at the station. Line 2 is operated by Seoul Metro and is a circle route with two spur lines. The subway runs with varying headways depending on the time of day. During rush hour it can come as often as every 5 minutes and in non-peak times it can be as infrequent as every 15 minutes. It takes an equal amount of time in either direction to reach Guro Digital Complex Station on Line 2 from Konkuk University Station making it the mid-way point on the opposite side of the loop.

Line 7 runs from Seongnam to Jangam with a similar schedule to Line 2. It is operated by Seoul Metro. Passengers can directly transfer to every line on the subway system from either Line 2 or Line 7 except for the Incheon and Airport Express Lines. This station is one of two transfer points between Line 2 and 7.

At the various exits for the station, ten different bus lines make stops. These buses including various trunk, branch and rapid buses. The airport shuttle bus, route 6013, also has a drop off and pick up stop near exit 5 of the station.

== Average Daily Ridership ==
Line	Passenger Count								
Line	2000	2001	2002	2003	2004	2005	2006	2007	2008
Line 2	39055	38008	40409	39258	39499	40017	39577	41568	44435
Line 7	6393	7985	7582	8510	8345	9038	10236	10554	10301
