= Jamsilsaenae station =

Train station in South Korea

잠실새내; Jamsilsaenae
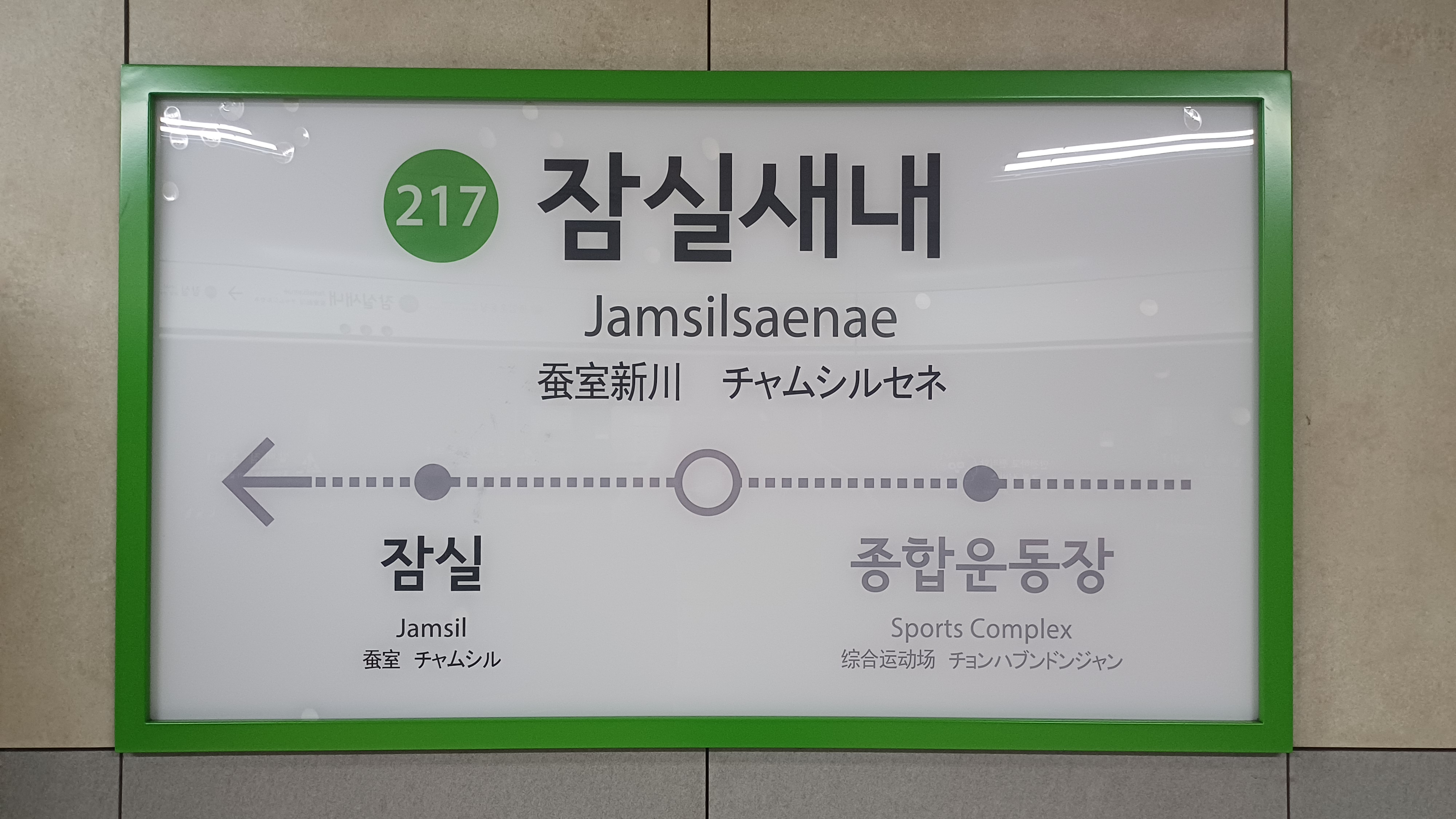
- Station Sign

Korean name
- Hangul: 잠실새내역
- Hanja: 蠶室새내驛
- Revised Romanization: Jamsil-saenae-yeok
- McCune–Reischauer: Chamsil-saenae-yŏk

General information
- Location: 5 Jamsilbon-dong, Songpa-gu, Seoul
- Coordinates: 37°30′41″N 127°05′10″E
- Operator: Seoul Metro
- Line: Line 2
- Platforms: 2
- Tracks: 2

Construction
- Structure type: Underground

History
- Former names: Sincheon

Key dates
- October 31, 1980: Line 2 opened
- December 15, 2016: Name changed from Sincheon to Jamsilsaenae

Passengers
- (Daily) Based on Jan-Dec of 2012. Line 2: 53,280

Services
Preceding station	Seoul Metropolitan Subway	Following station
Jamsil Next counterclockwise	Line 2	Sports Complex Next clockwise
Location

Jamsilsaenae Station (Korean: 잠실새내역) is a station on Seoul Subway Line 2, located in Jamsil-dong, Songpa District, Seoul. On December 15, 2016, it was decided to change the name Sincheon to Jamsilsaenae, to avoid confusion with Sinchon Station on the opposite end of the line. Saenae (새내) is the native Korean pronunciation of the Sino-Korean Sincheon (新川), meaning "new stream".

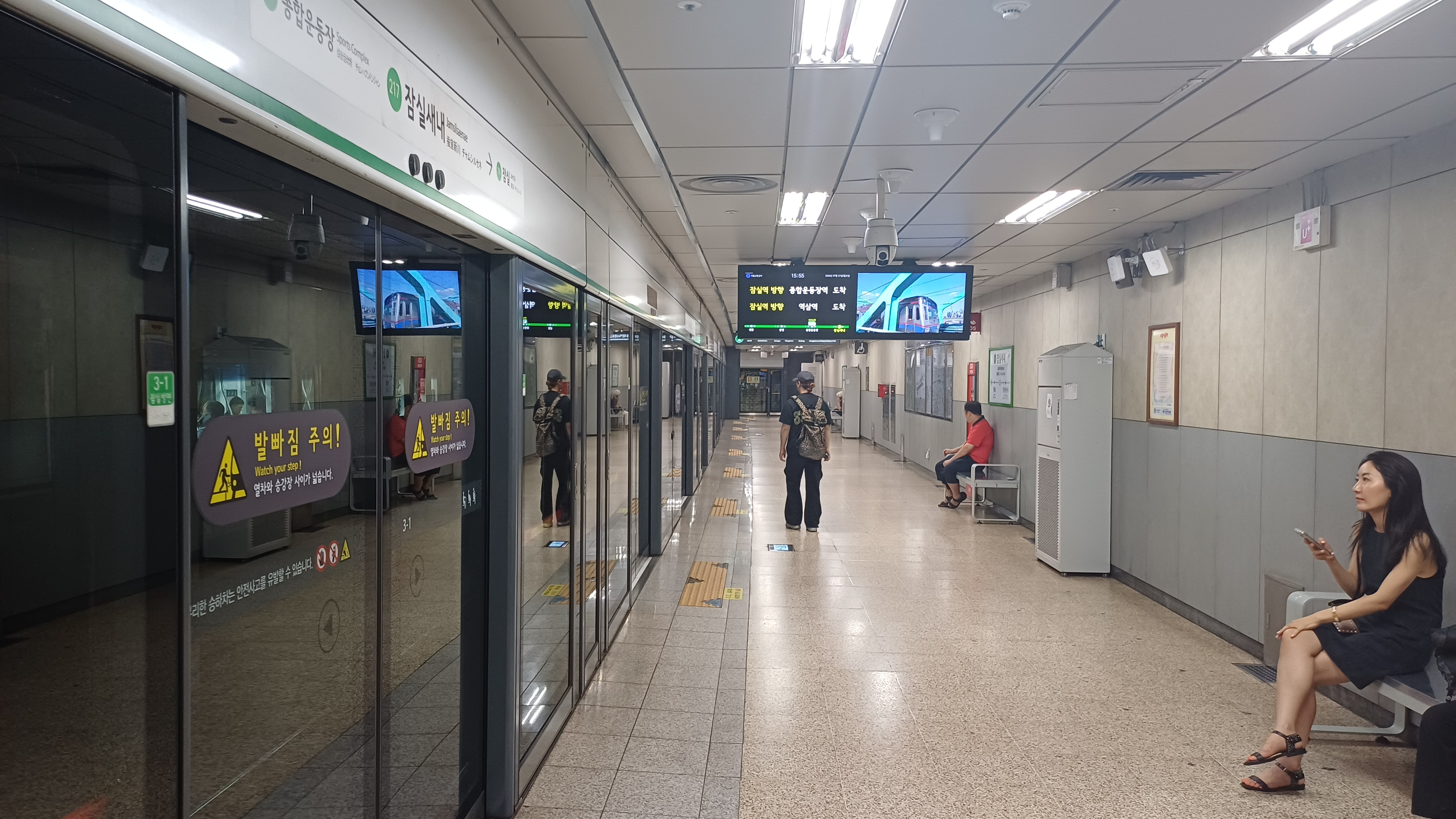
Platform

== Station layout ==
G	Street level	Exit

L1; Concourse	Lobby	Customer Service, Shops, Vending machines, ATMs

L2; Platform level	Side platform, doors will open on the right
L2; Platform level	Inner circle	← Line 2 Next clockwise (Sports Complex)
L2; Platform level	Outer circle	Line 2 Next counterclockwise (Jamsil) →
L2; Platform level	Side platform, doors will open on the right
