= Seoul Subway Line 2 =

Subway line in South Korea

Coordinates: 37.556°N 126.940°E

Line 2
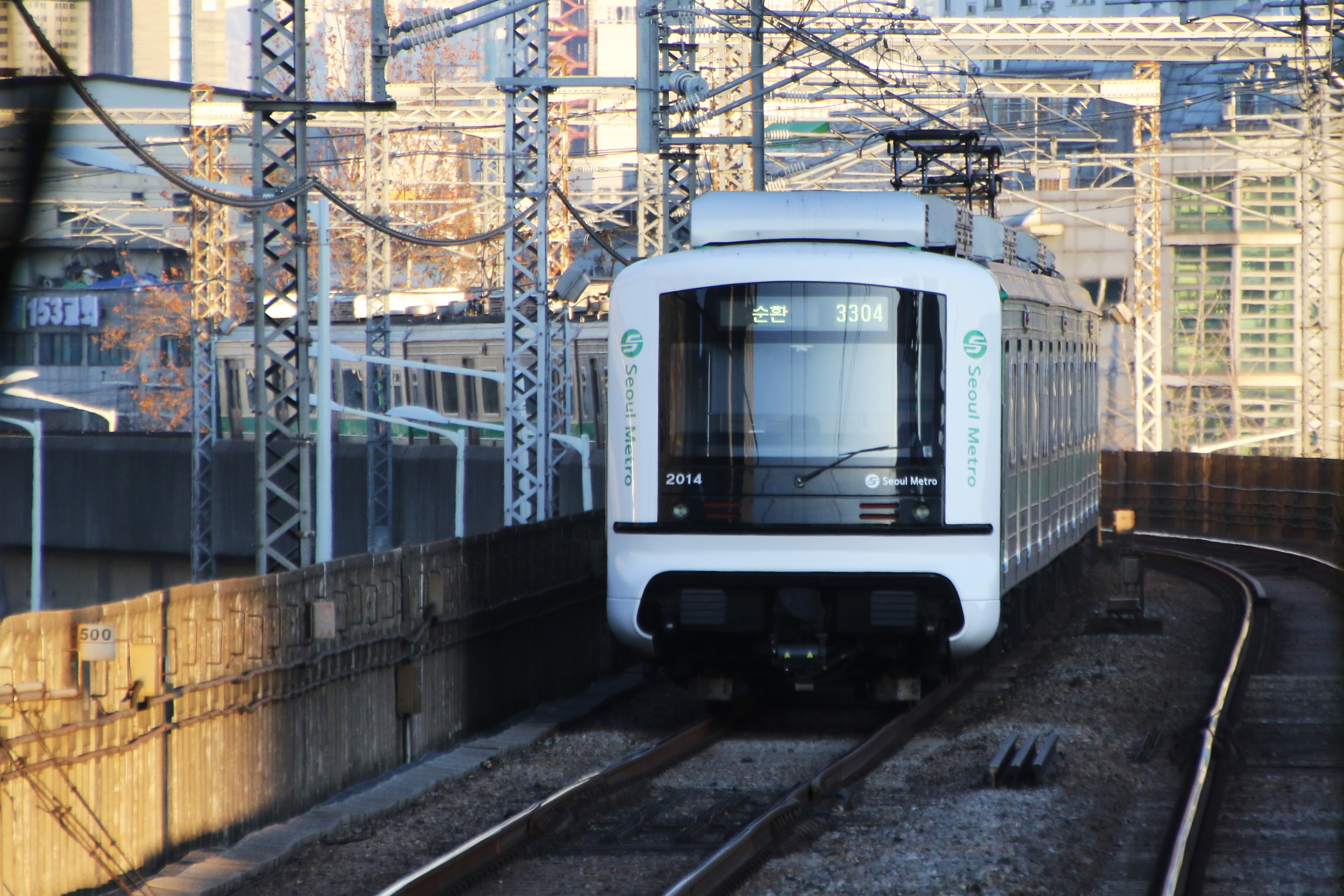

Overview
- Native name: 2호선(二號線); I Hoseon
- Status: Operational
- Termini: City Hall / Seongsu / Sindorim; City Hall / Sinseol-dong / Kkachisan
- Stations: 51

Service
- Type: Rapid transit
- System: Seoul Metropolitan Subway
- Operator: Seoul Metro
- Daily ridership: 1,964,128 (2024)
- Ridership: 718.87 million (2024) (▲2.5%)

History
- Opened: October 31, 1980; 46 years ago
- Last extension: 1996

Technical
- Line length: 60.2 km (37.4 mi)
- Num of tracks: 2
- Electrification: 1,500 V DC overhead catenary
- Operating speed: 90 km/h (56 mph)

Seoul Subway Line 2 (Korean: 서울 지하철 2호선), also known as the Circle Line, is a circular line of the Seoul Metropolitan Subway. The line running clockwise is called the "inner circle" and the counterclockwise line is called the "outer circle". This is Seoul's most heavily used line, and consists of the main loop (48.8 km (30.3 mi)), the Seongsu Branch (5.4 km (3.4 mi)) and the Sinjeong Branch (6.0 km (3.7 mi)) for a total line length of 60.2 km (37.4 mi). The Line 2 loop is the third longest subway loop in the world after Moscow Metro Bolshaya Koltsevaya line and Beijing Subway Line 10. (Note: As of March 2023, Seoul Subway Line 2 is the third longest rapid transit loop line after Line 10 of Beijing Subway and Bolshaya Koltsevaya line of Moscow Metro. When accounting for total distance (+ both branch lines), Seoul Subway Line 2 is the second-longest, only losing out to Bolshaya Koltsevaya line by 1.5 km (0.93 mi).) In 2019, Line 2 had an annual ridership of 812 million passengers or 2.2 million passengers per day.

Line 2's station signs share their design with the underground station signs on Line 1, but green and with arms pointing to the next and previous stations.

Headways on the line vary from 2 minutes 18 seconds on peak periods and 5–6 minutes off-peak periods. The line connects the city centre to Gangnam, Teheran Valley and the COEX/KWTC complex.

== History ==
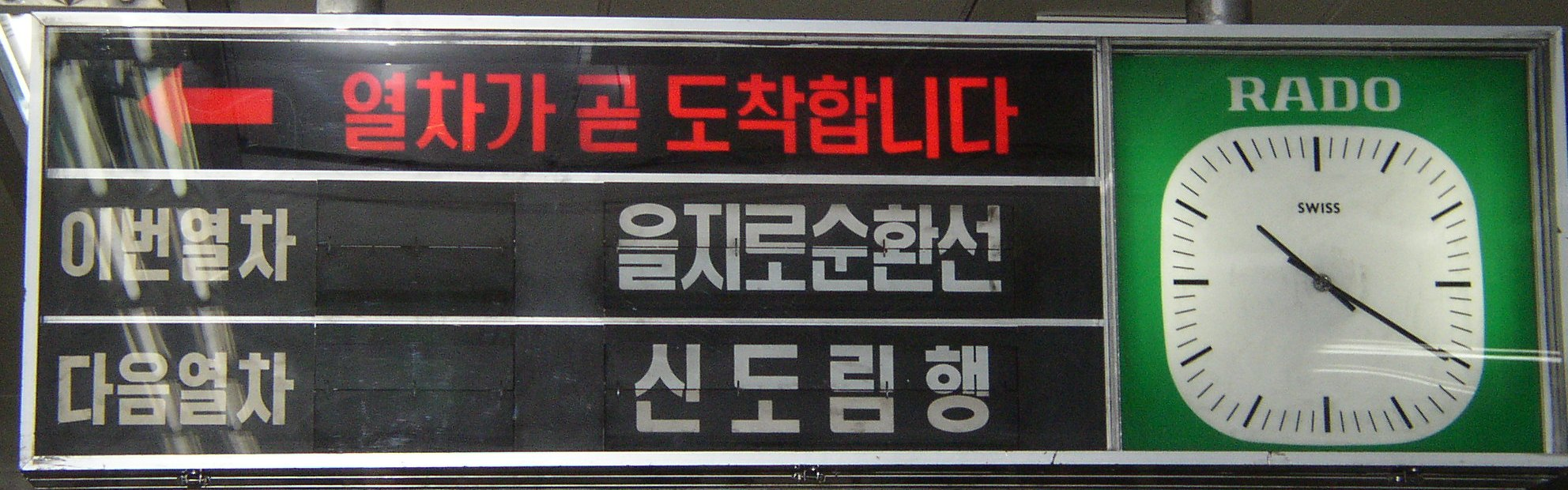
Former split-flap display passenger information system signs used on Seoul Subway Line 2 from 1980 until replaced with flat-screen TV displays in 2005–10.

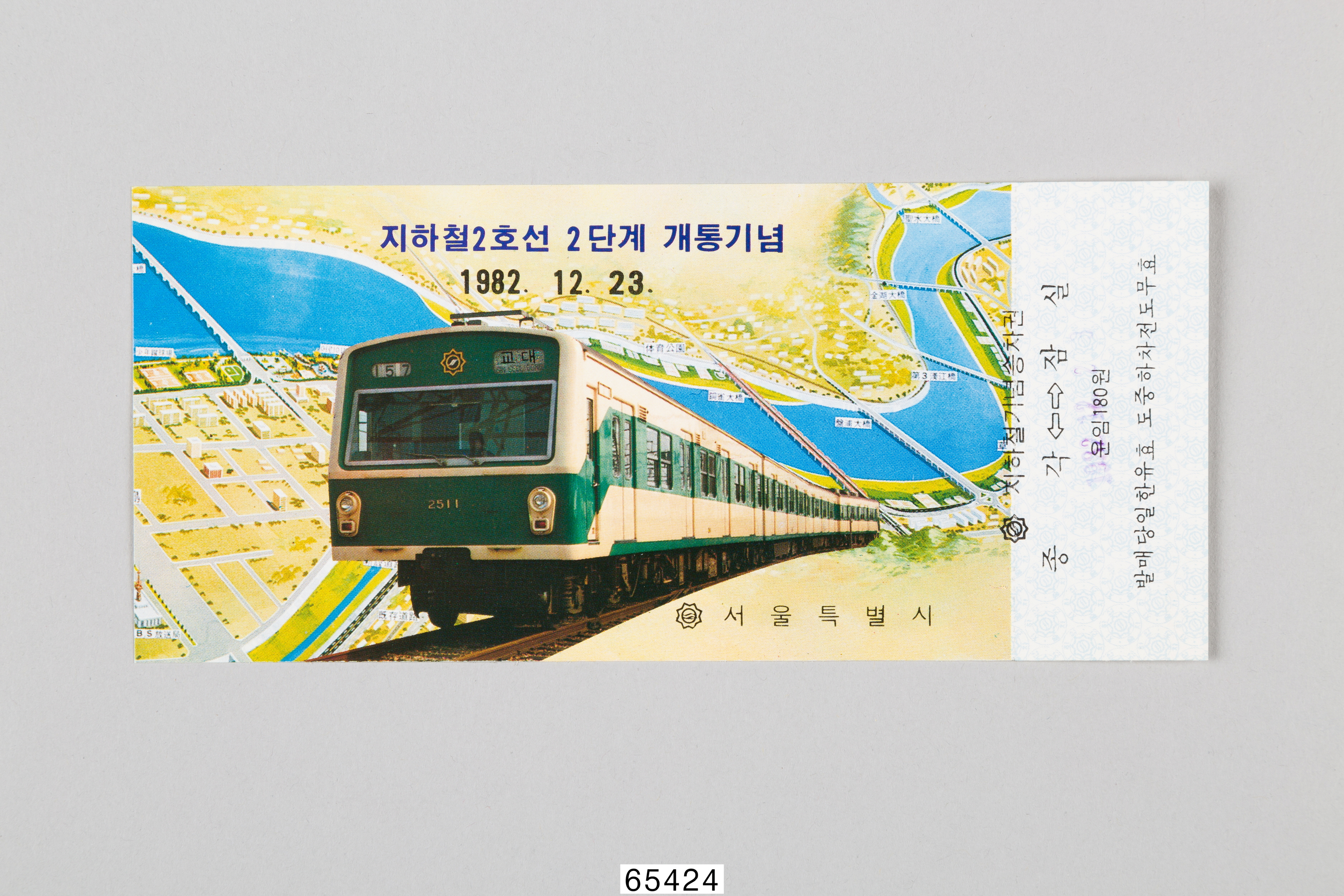
Commemorative ticket issued for the opening of the second phase of Seoul Subway Line 2 on December 23, 1982.

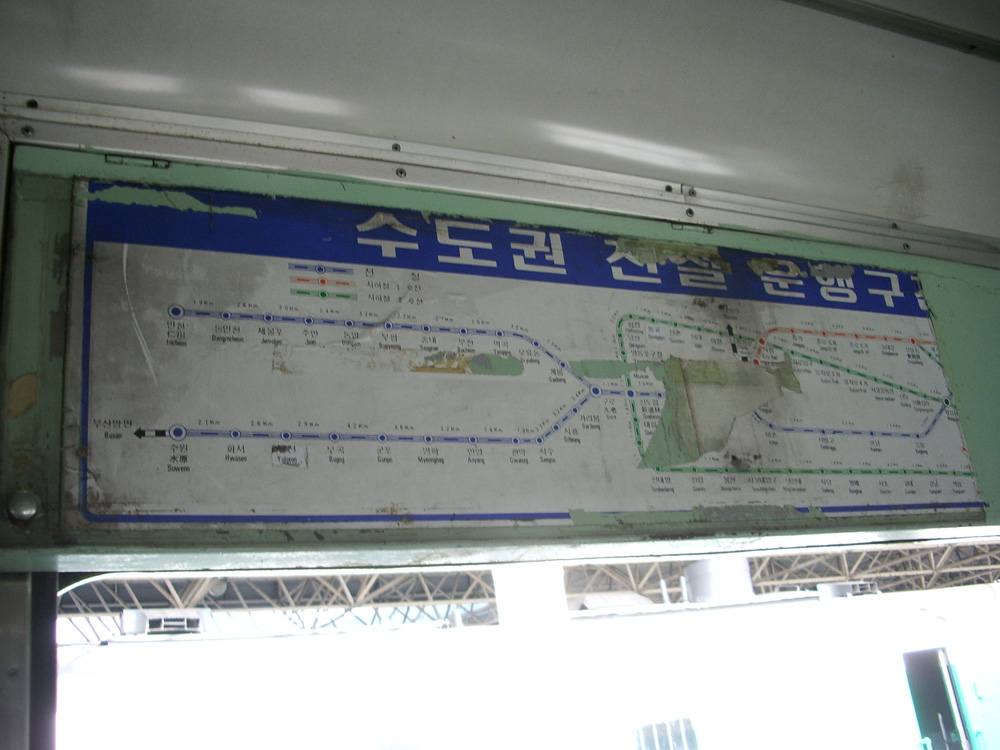
Fragment of an early-1980s Seoul Subway map, showing the western two-thirds of the Line 2 loop as a green line.

In 1972, then-Mayor of Seoul Koo Ja-choon (1932–1996) changed the existing plans for the Seoul Subway to better enable connectivity around the growing Seoul City and allow for development to take place across the Seoul Metropolitan Area. Line 2 was built in 1978–84 together with the Seongsu Branch (the second Sinjeong Branch was built 1989–95). Dangsan Railway Bridge was closed for reconstruction in 1996 and reopened November 22, 1999. The old steel girder bridge was replaced by a 1.3-kilometre (0.81 mi) long concrete bridge between Dangsan on the southern side of the river and Hapjeong on the northern bank. During this period, the inner loop only ran to Dangsan Station, and the outer loop only ran to either Hongik University Station or Hapjeong Station. (Note: At the time, shuttle buses were deployed between Dangsan Station and Hapjeong Station to minimize passenger inconvenience. On November 22, 1999, the Dangsan Bridge reopened, restoring the entire loop line to service, and the lines reverted to alternate operation on the outer and inner loops.)

Yongdu station on the Seongsu Branch (between Sindap and Sinseol stations) is the first station in the Seoul Subway system with operating platform screen doors. As of 2008 platform screen doors are operating at all stations along Line 2. New rolling stock has also progressively came on line, replacing older vehicles.

● October 31, 1980	Sinseol-dong – Sports Complex (via Seongsu) section opened
● December 23, 1982	Sports Complex – Seoul Nat'l Univ. of Education section opened
● September 16, 1983	Euljiro 1-ga – Seongsu section opened; Sinseol-dong – Seongsu section separated as Seongsu Branch
● December 17, 1983	Seoul Nat'l Univ. of Education – Seoul Nat'l University section opened
● May 22, 1984	Seoul Nat'l University – Euljiro 1-ga (via Sindorim) section opened; the Circle Line (the longest in the world at 54.2 km (33.7 mi) until it was surpassed in 2013) is completed.
● May 22, 1992	Sindorim – Yangcheon-gu Office section opened as Sinjeong Branch
● February 29, 1996	Sinjeongnegeori Station opened as extension of Sinjeong Branch
● March 20, 1996	Kkachisan Station opened as extension of Sinjeong Branch
● October 20, 2005	Yongdu Station opened on the Seongsu Branch
● September 2010	Siemens Mobility ATP/ATO GoA 2 signalling system implemented on newer trains to increase frequencies and route capacity.

== Facilities ==
In December 2010 the line is recorded as having the highest WiFi data consumption in the Seoul Metropolitan area. It averaged 2.56 times more than the other 14 subway lines fitted with WiFi service zones.

In 2011, retailer Homeplus opened the world's first virtual supermarket at Seolleung station, where smartphone users can photograph the bar code of life-size pictures of 500 items of food, toiletries, electronics etc. on the walls and platform screen doors, for delivery the same day.

== Stations ==
All stations on all branches are in Seoul.

=== Main Line ===
Station number	Station name		Connections	Distance		Location
Station number	English	Hangul	Connections	in km	Total	Location
201	City Hall	시청	Seoul Subway Line 1	---	0.0	Jung-gu
202	Euljiro 1(il)-ga (Hana Bank)	을지로입구 (하나은행)		0.7	0.7	Jung-gu
203	Euljiro 3(sam)-ga (Shinhan Card)	을지로3가 (신한카드)	Seoul Subway Line 3	0.8	1.5	Jung-gu
204	Euljiro 4(sa)-ga (BC Card)	을지로4가 (BC카드)	Seoul Subway Line 5	0.6	2.1	Jung-gu
205	Dongdaemun History & Culture Park (DDP)	동대문역사문화공원 (DDP)	Seoul Subway Line 4 Seoul Subway Line 5	1.0	3.1	Jung-gu
206	Sindang	신당	Seoul Subway Line 6	0.9	4.0	Jung-gu
207	Sangwangsimni	상왕십리		0.9	4.9	Seongdong-gu
208	Wangsimni (Seongdong-gu Office)	왕십리 (성동구청)	Gyeongui–Jungang Line Suin–Bundang Line	0.8	5.7	Seongdong-gu
209	Hanyang Univ.	한양대		1.0	6.7	Seongdong-gu
210	Ttukseom	뚝섬		1.1	7.8	Seongdong-gu
211	Seongsu	성수	(Seongsu branch)	0.8	8.6	Seongdong-gu
212	Konkuk Univ.	건대입구	Seoul Subway Line 7	1.2	9.8	Gwangjin-gu
213	Guui (Gwangjin-gu Office)	구의 (광진구청)		1.6	11.4	Gwangjin-gu
214	Gangbyeon (Dongseoul Bus Terminal)	강변 (동서울터미널)		0.9	12.3	Gwangjin-gu
215	Jamsillaru (Suhyup Insurance)	잠실나루 (수협중앙회공제보험)		1.8	14.1	Songpa-gu
216	Jamsil (Songpa-gu Office)	잠실 (송파구청)	Seoul Subway Line 8	1.0	15.1	Songpa-gu
217	Jamsilsaenae	잠실새내		1.2	16.3	Songpa-gu
218	Sports Complex	종합운동장	Seoul Subway Line 9	1.2	17.5	Songpa-gu
219	Samseong (World Trade Center Seoul)	삼성 (무역센터)	(2028)	1.0	18.5	Gangnam-gu
220	Seolleung (Acuon Savings Bank)	선릉 (애큐온저축은행)	Suin–Bundang Line	1.3	19.8	Gangnam-gu
221	Yeoksam (Centerfield)	역삼 (센터필드)		1.2	21.0	Gangnam-gu
222	Gangnam	강남	Shinbundang Line	0.8	21.8	Gangnam-gu
223	Seoul National University of Education (Court & Prosecutors' Office)	교대 (법원·검찰청)	Seoul Subway Line 3	1.2	23.0	Seocho-gu
224	Seocho	서초		0.7	23.7	Seocho-gu
225	Bangbae (Baekseok Arts Univ.)	방배 (백석예술대)		1.7	25.4	Seocho-gu
226	Sadang	사당	Seoul Subway Line 4	1.6	27.0	Dongjak-gu
227	Nakseongdae (Ganggamchan)	낙성대 (강감찬)		1.7	28.7	Gwanak-gu
228	Seoul National University (Gwanak-gu Office)	서울대입구 (관악구청)		1.0	29.7	Gwanak-gu
229	Bongcheon	봉천		1.0	30.7	Gwanak-gu
230	Sillim (Yangji Hospital)	신림 (양지병원)	Sillim Line	1.1	31.8	Gwanak-gu
231	Sindaebang	신대방		1.8	33.6	Dongjak-gu
232	Guro Digital Complex (Wonkwang Digital Univ.)	구로디지털단지 (원광디지털대)		1.1	34.7	Guro-gu
233	Daerim (Guro-gu Office)	대림 (구로구청)	Seoul Subway Line 7	1.1	35.8	Guro-gu
234	Sindorim	신도림	(Sinjeong branch)	1.8	37.6	Guro-gu
235	Mullae (Kim's Eye Hospital)	문래 (김안과병원)		1.2	38.8	Yeongdeungpo-gu
236	Yeongdeungpo-gu Office	영등포구청	Seoul Subway Line 5	0.9	39.7	Yeongdeungpo-gu
237	Dangsan	당산	Seoul Subway Line 9	1.1	40.8	Yeongdeungpo-gu
238	Hapjeong (Holt Children's Services, Inc)	합정 (홀트아동복지회)	Seoul Subway Line 6	2.0	42.8	Mapo-gu
239	Hongik Univ. (Eduwill Academy)	홍대입구 (에듀윌학원)	Gyeongui–Jungang Line	1.1	43.9	Mapo-gu
240	Sinchon	신촌 (지하)		1.3	45.2	Mapo-gu
241	Ewha Womans Univ.	이대		0.8	46.0	Mapo-gu
242	Ahyeon	아현		0.9	46.9	Mapo-gu
243	Chungjeongno (Kyonggi Univ.)	충정로 (경기대입구)	Seoul Subway Line 5	0.8	47.7	Seodaemun-gu

=== Seongsu Branch ===
Station number	Station name		Connections	Distance		Location
Station number	English	Hangul	Connections	in km	Total	Location
211	Seongsu	성수	(Main Line)	---	0.0	Seongdong-gu
211-1	Yongdap	용답		2.3	2.3	Seongdong-gu
211-2	Sindap	신답		1.0	3.3	Seongdong-gu
211-3	Yongdu (Dongdaemun-gu Office)	용두 (동대문구청)		0.9	4.2	Dongdaemun-gu
211-4	Sinseol-dong	신설동	Ui LRT	1.2	5.4	Dongdaemun-gu

=== Sinjeong Branch ===
Station number	Station name		Connections	Distance		Location
Station number	English	Hangul	Connections	in km	Total	Location
234	Sindorim	신도림	(Main Line)	---	0.0	Guro-gu
234-1	Dorimcheon	도림천		1.0	1.0	Guro-gu
234-2	Yangcheon-gu Office	양천구청		1.7	2.7	Yangcheon-gu
234-3	Sinjeongnegeori	신정네거리		1.9	4.6	Yangcheon-gu
234-4	Kkachisan	까치산	Seoul Subway Line 5	1.4	6.0	Gangseo-gu

== Extension ==
There is a possible extension currently in the conception stage to extend the Sinjeong Branch to 3.7 km to Gayang Station on Line 9. The path would include a new station named Gangseo-gu Office in between Kkachisan and Gayang.

== Rolling stock ==
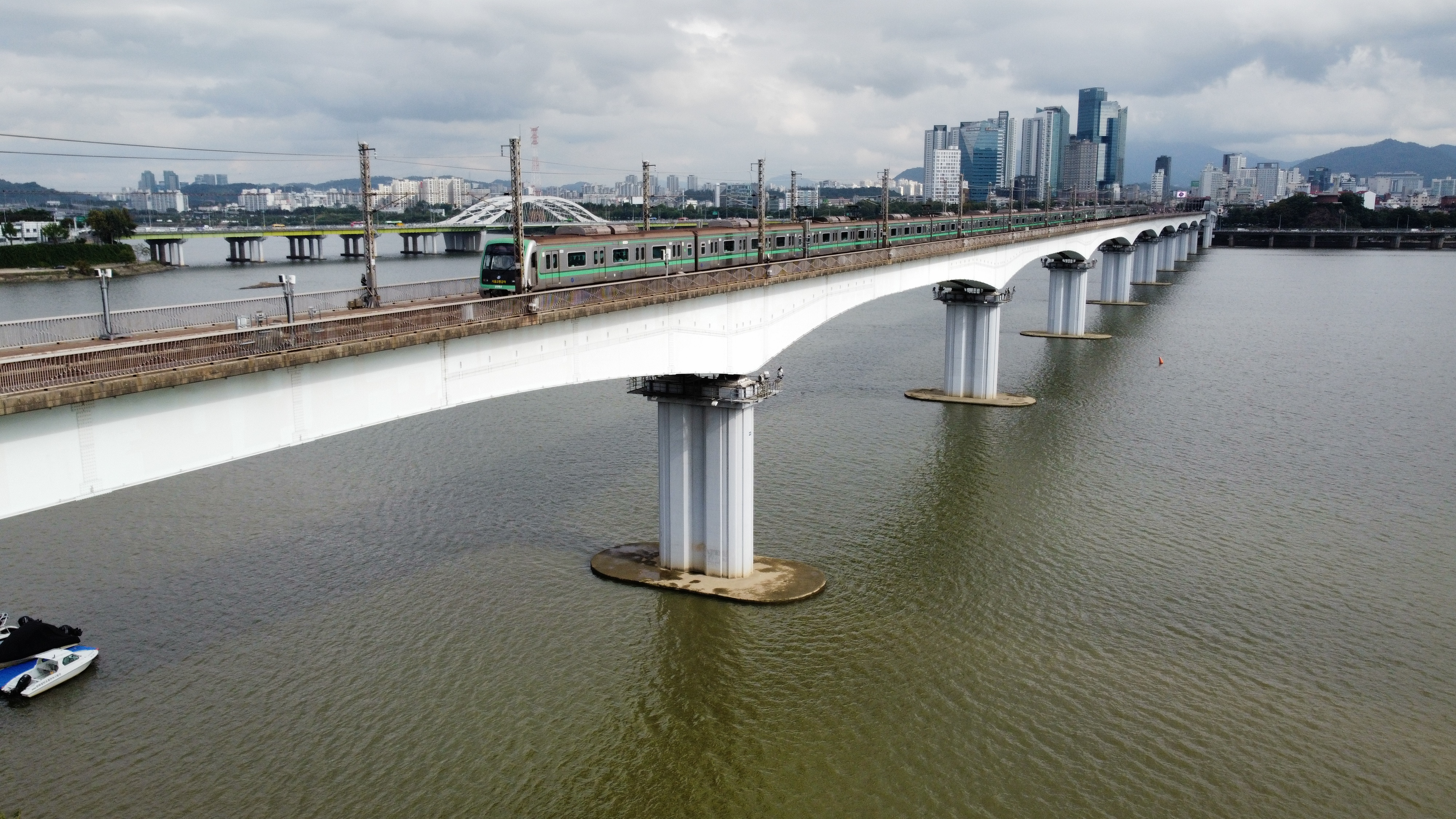
Second-generation Seoul Metro 2000 series VVVF-inverter train (third batch) crossing the Dangsan Railway Bridge on the Han River in October 2022.

Five generations of Seoul Metro 2000 series trains have been used on Seoul Subway Line 2. As of November 2026, only third, fourth and fifth batch 2000 series trains are in operation (manufactured by Hyundai Rotem and Dawonsys respectively), since all first (MELCO thyristor chopper control) and second batch (GEC Traction/Alstom thyristor chopper control) trains have been retired between 2008 and 2023. All trains are stored and maintained at Sindap Depot on the Seongsu Branch and Sinjeong Depot on the Sinjeong Branch.

== Ridership ==
Seoul Subway Line 2 Ridership (Note: The ridership is calculated based on boarding and transferring passengers (a+c). The data tallies between the two sources but the Seoul Metro source is more granular. The ridership data is derived from the 서울교통공사 수송실적 (Seoul Metro transport performance) data/report.)
Year	Ridership	Change (%)	Remarks
2026	367,298,520		Updated as of June 2026
2025	725,638,897	▲1	
2024	718,870,848	▲2.5	
2023	701,064,000	▲8.7	
2022	644,871,000	▲12.9	
2021	571,437,000	▼1.1	
2020	577,744,000	▼28.8	COVID-19 pandemic
2019	811,960,000	▲0.7	Highest on record
2018	806,562,000	▲0.5	
2017	802,358,000	▼1.2	
2016	811,763,000	▲6.6	
2015	761,807,000	▼1.2	
2014	771,242,000	▲1.6	
2013	759,308,000	▲0.8	
2012	752,918,000	▲0.7	
2011	747,578,000	▲2.1	
2010	731,848,000	▼0.0	
2009	732,038,000	▲0.7	
2008	727,057,000	▲2.8	
2007	707,328,000	▲1.2	
2006	699,222,000	▲0.1	
2005	698,776,000	▼0.7	
2004	703,796,000	▲1.7	
2003	692,287,000	▼0.1	
2002	692,766,000	▲2.4	
2001	676,271,000	▲3	
2000	656,567,000	▲9.2	
1999	601,462,000	▲1	
1998	595,320,000	▼3.9	
1997	619,405,000	-	

== See also ==
- 2014 Seoul subway crash
- Subways in South Korea
- Seoul Metropolitan Subway
