= Seoul Metro 2000 series =

- Seoul Metro 2000 series (2005)
- Seoul Metro 2000 series (first generation)
