= Seoul Metropolitan Subway rolling stock =

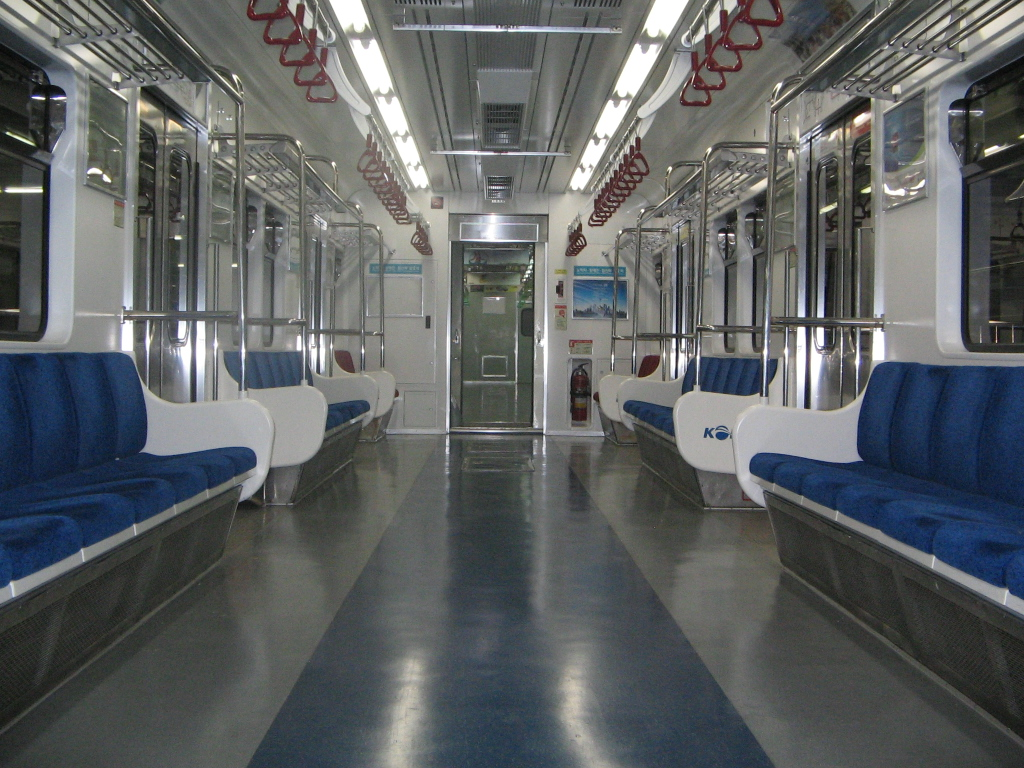
Interior of Korail Class 311000 for Seoul Subway (Before Refurbishment)

There are many types of trains in Seoul but they are generally similar to each other. Typically, train cars have four pairs of doors on each side. In between the doors are rows of either cushioned or non-cushioned seats for 7 people (6 on newer trains), except for the outer ends of each wagon where there are smaller rows of seats for 3 people, marked for the use by the elderly, disabled passengers, and pregnant women.

This list focuses primarily on trains that run on the 9 urban subway lines in Seoul, the wide-area commuter rail lines integrated into the Seoul Metropolitan Subway, and the AREX airport railroad. The list does not, however, include rolling stock used on the Incheon Subway and light metro systems such as the U Line or EverLine.

== Features ==
=== Emergency procedures ===
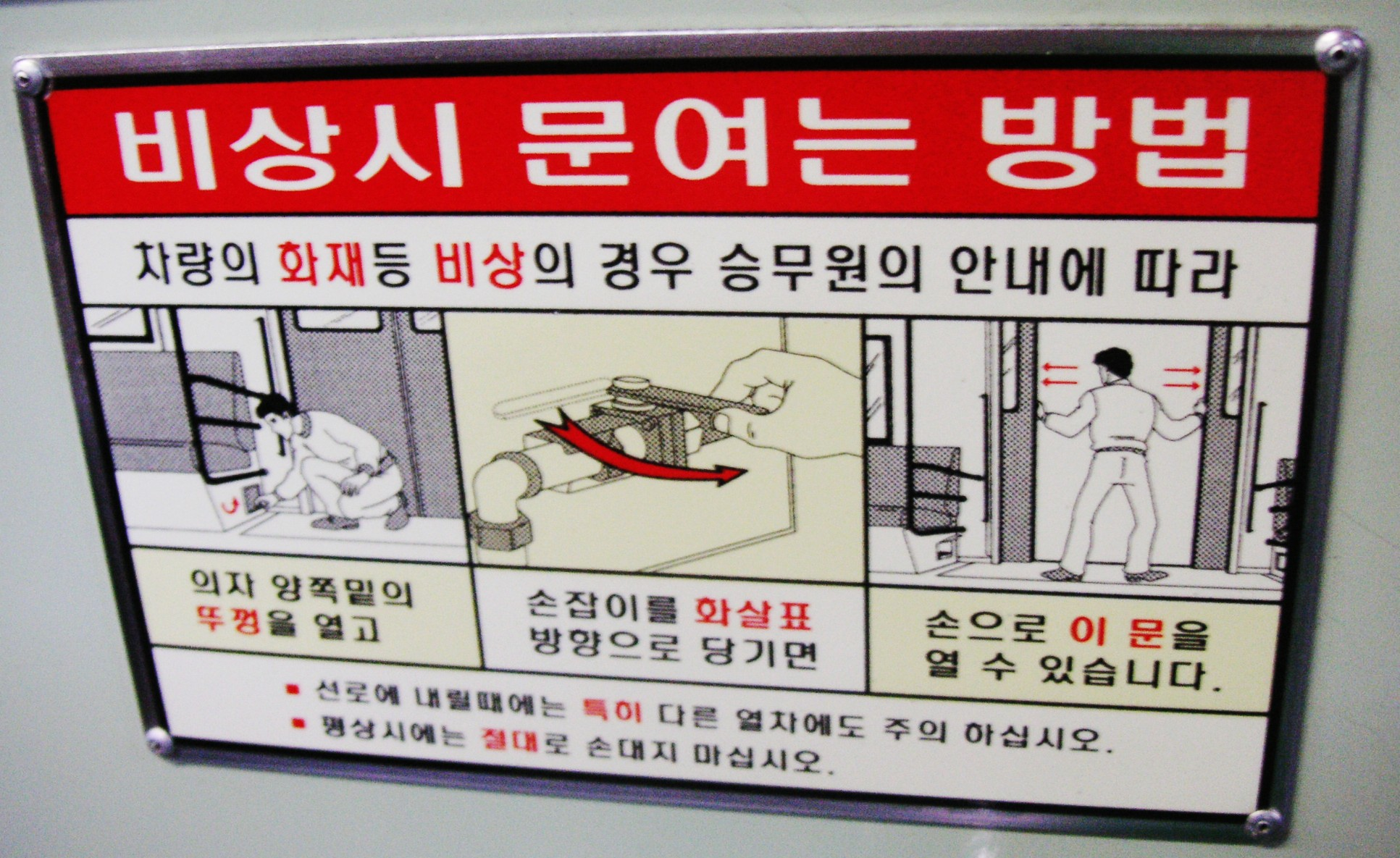
How to open the doors in a Seoul Subway train.

Each train has at least one fire extinguisher and options for opening the door in an emergency. A SOS phone is placed in most cars operated by the Seoul Metropolitan Rapid Transit Corporation, and all new rolling stock.

=== Help for English Speakers ===
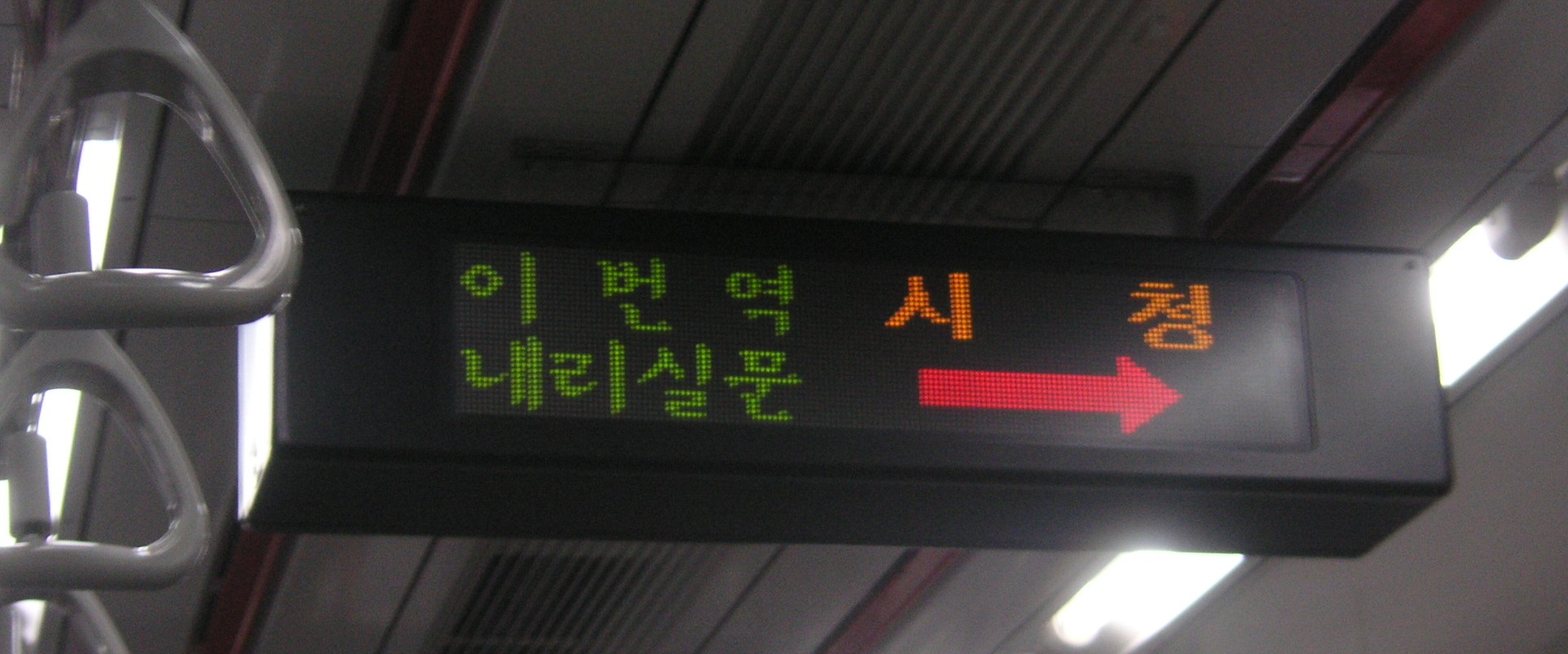
LED display in a Seoul Subway train, showing Korean. Next the display would switch to an English version.

All trains in Seoul have both English and Korean announcements regarding each train stop. In addition, a map displays their names in both Korean and Latin characters. Many trains also have a LED display above a door or in the middle of the train car that displays information in Korean and English. However, many destination signs from the sides of the train have been removed due to their reduced visibility with the installation of platform screen doors. Some of the newest trains feature LCD screens above the doors or the middle of the train that display short commercials and station information.

== Fleet ==
=== Seoul Metro & Korail ===
All cars are 19.5 meters in length, 3.12 meters in width, and 3.8 meters in height. (63.98 feet in length, 10.24 feet in width, and 12.47 feet in height.) Newer trains operated by Seoul Metro are usually given the same variables because they are intended to replace older trains.

All trains on Lines 5-8 are equipped with an ATO (Automatic Train Operation) systems. As a backup, there is always a driver on board in case of a failure in the ATO system.

==== Active (built before 2000) ====
Series	Operator	Year built and Builder	Photo	Numbers & Total Ordered	Assigned Services	Yard Assignment	Notes
Seoul Metro 1000 series (first generation, newer cars)	Seoul Metro	1989/1999/2004 (rebuilt 1999 & 2002); Daewoo Heavy Industries, Hyundai Precision & Industries Corporation, Hyundai Rotem		1-11~1-16 (6 trains, 60 cars)	Seoul Subway Line 1	Gunja	Created from newer cars used to extend first generation 1000 series trains to ten cars.; Trains 111~114 were originally numbered as trains 113/114~119/120.; Train 1-11 used four powered cars built in 1999 when it was train 113/114.; One driving car of former train 113/114 was written off following an accident in 2002, so a new driving car was built in 2004, and the train returned to service as train 1-11.; Limited to local service between Yangju and Incheon/Seodongtan due to lower maximum speeds.
Seoul Metro 4000 series (first generation)	Seoul Metro	1993–1994; Hyundai Precision & Industries Corporation (1st batch), Daewoo Heavy Industries (2nd batch)		4-01~4-26, 4-51~4-71 (47 trains, 470 cars)	Seoul Subway Line 4	Chang-dong	Trains 4-01~4-26 use DC pantographs and operate between Jinjeop and Sadang only, while trains 4-51~4-71 use AC pantographs and can operate on the full length of Line 4.; Trains 4-01~4-09 & 4-51~4-63 are first batch trains built in 1993, while trains 4-10~4-26 & 4-64~4-71 are second batch trains built in 1994.; Trains 4-51 was retrofitted with propulsion systems from Dawonsys.; Trains 4-66, 4-70, and 4-71 were retrofitted with propulsion systems from Woojin Industrial Systems.; Train 4-61 was retired after an accident at Sanggye station.; Trains 4-16, 4-65, 4-67, and 4-69 are retired because of various issues.; Successor trains on the way.
Seoul Metro 5000 series (first generation)	Seoul Metro	1994-1997; Hyundai Precision & Industries Corporation		5-01~5-76 (76 trains, 608 cars)	Seoul Subway Line 5	Banghwa & Godeok	Trains 5-02 was retrofitted with propulsion systems from Dawonsys.; Train 5-18 is retired because of various issues.; Trains 5-01 to 5-25 retired by 2024, remaining trains to be progressively retired by 2028.
Seoul Metro 7000/8000 series (first generation)	Seoul Metro	1995-1996; Daewoo Heavy Industries		Line 7: 7-01~7-17; Line 8: 8-01~8-15 (32 trains, 226 cars)	Seoul Subway Line 7 Seoul Subway Line 8	Line 7: Dobong; Line 8: Moran	Train 8-15 is retired because of various issues.
Korail Class 311000 (first generation)	Korail	1996–1998; Daewoo Heavy Industries, Hyundai Precision & Industries Corporation		311-01~311-41 (41 trains, 405 cars)	Seoul Subway Line 1	Guro & Imun	Formerly numbered 5-01~5-42.; Train 5-19 was damaged in an accident. Eight cars in the train were converted to two Class 319000 trains, while the other two were scrapped.; Trains 311-39 and 311-41 utilize three (in total) unpowered Korail Class 341000 cars.; Trains 311-01~311-06 are retired because of various issues.
Seoul Metro 1000 series (second generation)	Seoul Metro	1998–1999, 2002; Hyundai Precision & Industries Corporation (1st batch), Rotem (2nd batch)		1-01~1-10 (10 trains, 92 cars)	Seoul Subway Line 1	Gunja	Trains 1-01~1-06 are first batch trains built between 1998 & 1999, while trains 1-07~1-10 are second batch trains built in 2002.; Trains 1-05~1-06 use unpowered cars from first generation Seoul Metro 1000 series trains 101/102 & 103/104; Trains 1-09~1-10 use unpowered cars from first generation Seoul Metro 1000 series trains 121/122 & 123/124.; Limited to local service between Yangju and Incheon/Seodongtan due to lower maximum speeds.
Seoul Metro 6000 series	Seoul Metro	1999-2000; Hyundai Precision & Industries Corporation, KOROS		6-01~6-41 (41 trains, 328 cars)	(Note: Trains 6-40 & 6-41 only)	Line 6: Sinnae; Line 7: Dobong	
Seoul Metro 7000/8000 series (second generation)	Seoul Metro	1999-2000; Hanjin Heavy Industries, KOROS		Line 7: 7-18~7-63; Line 8: 8-16~8-20 (originally 52 trains, 410 cars)	Seoul Subway Line 7 Seoul Subway Line 8	Line 7: Dobong & Cheonwang; Line 8: Moran	Order included trains formerly numbered 8-21 and 8-22.; Train 7-63 was formed from train 8-21 and two non-driving cars from train 8-22.; Three other cars (one driving car & two non-driving cars) from train 8-22 are utilized in train 7-52, was retired.; The remaining driving car from train 8-22 was repurposed into a mockup for the SR-series.

==== Active (built after 2000) ====
All trains use VVVF inverter-based propulsion systems. Older trains generally use GTOs, while newer trains generally use IGBTs.

Series	Operator	Year built and Builder	Photo	Numbers & Total Ordered	Assigned Services	Yard Assignment	Notes
Korail Class 311000 (second generation)	Korail	2002–2004; Hyundai Precision & Industries Corporation, Rotem		311-42~311-65 (24 trains, 240 cars)	Seoul Subway Line 1	Guro & Byeongjeom	Formerly numbered 5-43~5-66.
Korail Class 351000 (second generation)	Korail	2002–2004; Hyundai Precision & Industries Corporation, Rotem		351-23~351-28 (6 trains, 36 cars)	Suin–Bundang Line	Bundang	Formerly numbered 2-82~2-87.
Seoul Metro 2000 series (third generation, first batch)	Seoul Metro	2005; Rotem		2-01~2-05, 2-57 (6 trains, 54 cars)	Seoul Subway Line 2	Sinjeong & Gunja	Train 2-57 is 4 cars long and runs on the Seongsu Branch shuttle service.
Korail Class 311000 (third generation, first batch)	Korail	2005–2006; Rotem		311-66~311-82 (17 trains, 170 cars)	Seoul Subway Line 1	Guro, Byeongjeom, Imun	Formerly numbered 5-67~5-92.; Trains 5-79~5-80 were converted to Class 319000 trains.; Trains 5-86~5-92 were renumbered to Class 321000 trains.
Korail Class 319000	Korail	2006/1997; Hyundai Rotem (rebuilder)		319-01~319-07 (7 trains, 28 cars)	Seoul Subway Line 1	Guro	Trains 319-01~319-05 were formed from former Class 311000 trains 5-79~5-80, while trains 319-06-319-07 were formed from Class 311000 train 5-19.; Yeongdeungpo-Gwangmyeong shuttle service only.
Seoul Metro 2000 series (third generation, second batch)	Seoul Metro	2007–2008; Hyundai Rotem		2-15~2-31, 2-58~2-72 (32 trains, 298 cars)	Seoul Subway Line 2	Sinjeong & Gunja	Trains 2-58~2-60 operate on the Seongsu branch shuttle service.; Trains 2-23~2-31, 2-71, and 2-72 use unpowered cars from first generation Seoul Metro 2000-series trains. These cars are expected to be replaced in the 2020s.
Korail Class 321000	Korail	2006, 2008–2009; Rotem, Hyundai Rotem		321-01~321-21 (21 trains, 168 cars)	Gyeongui–Jungang Line	Yongmun	Trains 321-01~321-18 were formed from former Class 311000 trains 5-86~5-92 & former Class 6000 trains 6-01~6-07.
Korail Class 331000 (first generation)	Korail	2009; Hyundai Rotem		331-01~331-13 (13 trains, 104 cars)	Gyeongui–Jungang Line	Munsan	
Seoul Metro 3000 series (second generation)	Seoul Metro	2009–2010; Hyundai Rotem		3-01~3-33, 3-36~3-40, 3-49 (39 trains, 390 cars)	Seoul Subway Line 3	Jichuk & Suseo	
Korail Class 361000	Korail	2010; Hyundai Rotem		361-01~361-14 (14 trains, 112 cars)	Gyeongchun Line	Pyeongnae	The original train 361-14 was converted to Class 311000 train 311-90. The current 361-14 was formerly train 361-15.
Seoul Metro 7000 series ("SR000" series) (third generation)	Seoul Metro	2010-2012; Dawonsys		7-64~7-70 (SR001-SR007) (7 trains, 56 cars)	Seoul Subway Line 7	Cheonwang	
Korail Class 351000 (third generation, first batch)	Korail	2011–2014; Hyundai Rotem		351-29~351-43, 351-61~351-72 (27 trains, 162 cars)	Suin–Bundang Line	Bundang & Siheung	
Korail Class 331000 (second generation)	Korail	2011–2014; Hyundai Rotem		331-14~331-27 (14 trains, 66 cars)	Gyeongui–Jungang Line	Munsan	Trains 331-14~331-22 are 4 cars long and are used on the Seoul Station branch (Munsan to Seoul Station) and the Munsan–Imjingang and Imjingang–Dorasan shuttles
Korail Class 311000 (third generation, second batch)	Korail	2011–2014; Hyundai Rotem		311-83~311-90, 311-92~311-94 (11 trains, 102 cars)	Seoul Subway Line 1	Guro	Eight cars in trains 311-90 are former Class 361000 trains 361-14, built in 2010. Two additional cars were built to lengthen the train to 10 cars.
Korail Class 311000 (third generation, third batch)	Korail	2016–2017; Hyundai Rotem		311-95~312-03 (9 trains, 90 cars)	Seoul Subway Line 1	Guro	Class 381000 are used on the Seoul Station branch (Munsan to Seoul Station) and the Munsan–Imjingang and Imjingang–Dorasan shuttles. They originally ran on the Busan Metro Donghae Line.
Korail Class 371000	Korail	2016–2017; Hyundai Rotem		371-01~371-12 (12 trains, 48 cars)	Gyeonggang Line	Bubal	Class 381000 are used on the Seoul Station branch (Munsan to Seoul Station) and the Munsan–Imjingang and Imjingang–Dorasan shuttles. They originally ran on the Busan Metro Donghae Line.
Korail Class 381000 (first generation)	Korail	2016–2017; Hyundai Rotem		381-01~381-04 (4 trains, 16 cars)	Korail (from Busan)	Bubal	Class 381000 are used on the Seoul Station branch (Munsan to Seoul Station) and the Munsan–Imjingang and Imjingang–Dorasan shuttles. They originally ran on the Busan Metro Donghae Line.
Korail Class 351000 (third generation, second batch)	Korail	2016–2017; Hyundai Rotem		351-73~351-78 (6 trains, 36 cars)	Suin–Bundang Line	Bundang & Siheung	Class 381000 are used on the Seoul Station branch (Munsan to Seoul Station) and the Munsan–Imjingang and Imjingang–Dorasan shuttles. They originally ran on the Busan Metro Donghae Line.
Korail Class 391000	Korail	2016–2017; Hyundai Rotem		391-01~391-07 (7 trains, 28 cars)	Seohae Line	Siheung	Class 381000 are used on the Seoul Station branch (Munsan to Seoul Station) and the Munsan–Imjingang and Imjingang–Dorasan shuttles. They originally ran on the Busan Metro Donghae Line.
Seoul Metro 2000 series (third generation, third batch)	Seoul Metro	2017–2018; Dawonsys		2-06~2-13, 2-39~2-42, 2-85~2-92 (21 trains, 210 cars)	Seoul Subway Line 2	Sinjeong & Gunja	
Seoul Metro 5000 series (second generation)	Seoul Metro	2017–2018; Hyundai Rotem		5-77~5-80 (4 trains, 32 cars)	Seoul Subway Line 5	Godeok	
Korail Class 341000 (third generation)	Korail	2019–2024; Hyundai Rotem		341-31~341-60 (30 trains, 300 cars)	Seoul Subway Line 4	Siheung	Class 319000 trains will be relegated to a shuttle service between Kwangwoon University and Yeoncheon. They are temporarily in service on the Suin-Bundang Line between Oido and Incheon.
Korail Class 311000 (fourth generation)	Korail	2019–2024; Hyundai Rotem		312-04-312-15 (12 trains, 120 cars)	Seoul Subway Line 1	Guro	Class 319000 trains will be relegated to a shuttle service between Kwangwoon University and Yeoncheon. They are temporarily in service on the Suin-Bundang Line between Oido and Incheon.
Korail Class 319000 (second generation)	Korail	2019–2024; Hyundai Rotem		319-08~319-10 (3 trains, 18 cars)	(temporary) (future)	Siheung (temporary); Guro	Class 319000 trains will be relegated to a shuttle service between Kwangwoon University and Yeoncheon. They are temporarily in service on the Suin-Bundang Line between Oido and Incheon.
Seoul Metro 2000 series (third generation, fourth batch)	Seoul Metro	2019–2020; Hyundai Rotem		2-14, 2-32~2-38, 2-56, 2-73~2-84, 2-93 (22 trains, 214 cars)	Seoul Subway Line 2	Sinjeong & Gunja	Train 2-56 is 4 cars long and runs on the Seongsu Branch shuttle service.
Seoul Metro 4000 series (second generation)	Seoul Metro	2019–2020; Hyundai Rotem		4-81~4-85 (5 trains, 50 cars)	Seoul Subway Line 4	Chang-dong	Train 2-56 is 4 cars long and runs on the Seongsu Branch shuttle service.
Seoul Metro 7000 series (fourth generation)	Seoul Metro	2020; Dawonsys		7-71~7-72 (2 trains, 16 cars)	Seoul Subway Line 7	Cheonwang	
Seoul Metro 2000 series (third generation, fifth batch)	Seoul Metro	2020–2022; Dawonsys		2-45~2-48 (4 trains, 46 cars)	Seoul Subway Line 2	Sinjeong & Gunja	Operated as 6-car trains on the Sinjeong Branch shuttle service.; Also includes replacement unpowered non-driving cars for trains 2-23~2-31 and 2-71~2-72.
Seoul Metro 3000 series (second generation, second batch)	Seoul Metro	2021–2022; Dawonsys		3-16~3-20, 3-34~3-35, 3-41~3-48 (15 trains, 150 cars)	Seoul Subway Line 3	Jichuk & Suseo	
Seoul Metro 5000 series (third generation)	Seoul Metro	2021–2024; Woojin Industrial Systems		5-01~5-25 (25 trains, 200 cars)	Seoul Subway Line 5	Godeok	The Seoul Metro 5000 (third generation) and 7000 (fifth generation) series are the first trains on the network which use PMSM motors
Seoul Metro 7000 series (fifth generation)	Seoul Metro	2021–2024; Woojin Industrial Systems		7-01~7-17 (17 trains, 136 cars)	Seoul Subway Line 7	Dobong	The Seoul Metro 5000 (third generation) and 7000 (fifth generation) series are the first trains on the network which use PMSM motors
Seoul Metro 8000 series (third generation)	Seoul Metro	2021–2024; Woojin Industrial Systems		8-21~8-29 (9 trains, 54 cars)	Seoul Subway Line 8	Moran	The Seoul Metro 5000 (third generation) and 7000 (fifth generation) series are the first trains on the network which use PMSM motors
Korail Class 3000 (second generation)	Korail	2022–2023; Hyundai Rotem		3-87~3-94 (8 trains, 80 cars)	Seoul Subway Line 3	Jichuk	
Seoul Metro 4000 series (third generation)	Seoul Metro	2022– Dawonsys		4-50~4-70 (21 trains, 210 cars)	Seoul Subway Line 4	Chang-dong	Currently being delivered.
Korail Class 3000 (third generation)	Korail	2022– Woojin Industrial Systems		3-68~3-70, 3-95~3-99 (8 trains, 80 cars)	Seoul Subway Line 3	Jichuk	Currently being delivered.
Korail Class 311000 (fifth generation)	Korail	2022– Woojin Industrial Systems		312-16~312-56 (41 trains, 410 cars)	Seoul Subway Line 1	Guro, Byeongjeom, Imun	Currently being delivered.
Seoul Metro 4000 series (fourth generation)	Seoul Metro	2024– Woojin Industrial Systems		4-01~4-26 (26 trains, 260 cars)	Seoul Subway Line 4	Chang-dong	Currently being delivered.
Seoul Metro 5000 series (fourth generation)	Seoul Metro	2025– Dawonsys		5-26~5-51 (26 trains, 208 cars)	(Canceled)	Godeok & Banghwa	Canceled. Due to the delay in delivery, the contract will be terminated and the first train of D526 will be abandoned.

==== Retired ====
Model & series number	Operator	Year built and builder	Photo	Original numbers & total ordered	Assigned services	Year(s) retired	Notes
Seoul Metro 1000 series (first generation)	Seoul Metro Corporation	1972-1974; Hitachi		101/102-119/120 (10 trains)	Seoul Subway Line 1 Seoul Subway Line 2	1998–1999	Rheostat controls.; All trains were reorganized and lengthened to 10-car trains by newer cars built in 1989.; All trains received two unpowered cars each.; Trains 115/116~119/120 and 129/130~131/132 received eight powered cars each, and train 113/114 received two powered cars.; The newer cars were rebuilt & re-organized as current trains 1-11~1-16 or used as unpowered cars in second generation 1000-series trains 1-05~1-06 and 1-09~1-10.; Several trains temporarily ran on Line 2 when the line first opened due to a shortage of cars for the line.
Seoul Metro 1000 series (first generation)	Seoul Metro Corporation	1977–1978; Daewoo Heavy Industries		121/122-131/132 (16 trains)	Seoul Subway Line 1 Seoul Subway Line 2	2002	
Korail Class 1000 (first generation)	Korail	1972-1974, 1976–1981, 1985-1986; Daewoo Heavy Industries, Hyundai Precision, Kawasaki Heavy Industries, Kinki Sharyo, Nippon Sharyo, Tokyu Car Corporation		1-01~1-41 (41 trains)	Seoul Subway Line 1	1999–2004 (original cars); 2006 (un-overhauled newer cars); 2012–2014 (overhauled newer cars)	Rheostat controls.; The trailer cars of trains 1-29~1-35 were rebuilt into trains 1-88~1-94 and were retired in 2006.; Train 1-02 was involved in an accident in 1984. One driving car and one powered car were scrapped. The other driving car was transferred to train 1-14 after that train was involved in a separate accident. Two formerly surplus driving cars built in 1979 and a new powered car built in 1986 were utilized to replace the scrapped and transferred cars.; Many cars were refurbished and connected to second generation Korail Class 1000 trains.; Trains 1-39~1-41 received second generation Korail Class 1000 cars built in 1989 to become 10-car trains. The newer cars were linked in second generation trains or utilized as unpowered cars in Korail Class 311000 trains 311-39~311-41.
Seoul Metro 2000 series (first generation)	Seoul Metro Corporation, Seoul Metro	1980–1983, 1986; Daewoo Heavy Industries, Hyundai Precision & Industries Corporation, Hanjin Heavy Industries		2-01~2-39; 2-61~2-75 (see notes) (54 trains)	Seoul Subway Line 2	2005, 2007–2008	Controls & manufacturing years are as following: 2-01~2-14: rheostat controls, 1980–1982; 2-15~2-39: chopper controls from MELCO, 1983; 2-61~2-75: chopper controls from GEC, 1983-1984; Trains 2-01~2-38 were built as four-car trains, and trains 2-39 and 2-61~2-75 were built as six-car trains. Most trains received newer cars as following: Trains 2-01~2-08 and 2-15~2-38 received two unpowered cars built in 1986 to become six-car trains and train 2-09 received two cars built in 1990 to become a six-car train. Select 1986-built cars and all 1990-built cars were rebuilt and utilized as unpowered cars in current trains 2-45~2-48, but the retained 1986-built cars have since been replaced.; Trains 2-28~2-38 each received another four cars built in 1991 to become 10-car trains, and trains 2-15~2-27 & 2-39 each received four second generation cars built in 1992 to become 10-car trains. All 1991 and 1992-built cars, except for two cars in train 2-38, were rebuilt and either re-organized as the second iteration of trains 2-32~2-39 (retired 2020) or used as unpowered cars in third generation 2000 series trains 2-23~2-31.; Trains 2-61~2-75 were reorganized and received newer cars built in 1991 and 1993 to become 10-car trains. The newer cars were rebuilt and either re-organized as the second iteration of trains 2-73~2-77 (retired 2020) or used as unpowered cars in current trains 2-46~2-48 & third generation 2000-series trains 2-71~2-72.; Trains 2-01~2-05 each received four second generation cars built in 1993 to become 10-car trains. The newer cars were rebuilt and re-organized as current trains 2-45~2-48 and 2-56.; The second iteration of train 2-39 was involved in an accident in Sangwangsimni station. Four cars were retired and replaced with four salvaged cars from train 2-12 (the other train involved in the accident) to form a new train 2-39.; Trains 2-06~2-09 were renumbered to trains 2-45~2-48 and trains 2-12~2-14 were renumbered to trains 2-58~2-60 in 2005 when trains 2-45~2-53 took their former numbers.
Seoul Metro 2000 series (first generation)	Seoul Metro Corporation, Seoul Metro	1989–1990; Hyundai Precision & Industries Corporation, Hanjin Heavy Industries		2-40~2-52 (13 trains, 130 cars)	Seoul Subway Line 2	2018–2019	All cars used chopper controls from MELCO.; Original built as six-car trains; all trains received four cars built in 1991 to become 10-car trains.; Trains 2-45~2-52 were renumbered to 2-06~2-13.; Train 2-12 was wrecked in an accident in Sangwangsimni station with train 2-39. Four cars were salvaged to form a new train 2-39 (since retired).
Wide-width car (first batch)	Seoul Metro Corporation, Seoul Metro	1984–1985; Daewoo Heavy Industries		Line 3: 331/332-379/380; Line 4: 401/402~453/454 (52 trains)	Seoul Subway Line 2 Seoul Subway Line 3 Seoul Subway Line 4	2009–2010	Chopper controls from GEC.; Line 4 trains 401/402~429/430 and 447/448~453/454 were reorganized and renumbered to Line 3 trains 3-01~3-15 and 3-41~3-44.; All Line 3 trains and Line 4 trains 431/432~445/446 were reorganized and renumbered to the first iteration of Line 2 trains 2-76~2-77 and Line 3 trains 3-16~3-40. The driving cars of the Line 4 trains were converted to unpowered cars to extend some of the other trains to ten cars.; There were no trains with numbers ending from 01 to 30 initially due to numbering conflicts at the time.; Many trains received newer cars built between 1990 and 1993 to become 10-car trains. The newer cars were either scrapped or rebuilt & further reorganized into current trains 3-16~3-20 and 3-41~3-44.
Korail Class 1000 (second generation)	Korail	1986–1992; Daewoo Heavy Industries, Hyundai Precision & Industries Corporation, Hanjin Heavy Industries		1-42~1-72 (32 trains, 216 cars)	Seoul Subway Line 1	2006 (un-overhauled cars); 2012–2017 (overhauled cars)	Rheostat controls.; Trains 1-53, 1-57, 1-63, and 1-65 were not overhauled and were retired in 2006.; Trains 1-42~1-43 had their unpowered cars rebuilt as driving cars 1082, 1182, and 1087. Train 1-87 was retired in 2001 and train 1-82 was retired in 2006.
Seoul Metro 2000 series (second generation)	Seoul Metro Corporation, Seoul Metro	1993–1994; Daewoo Heavy Industries, Hyundai Precision & Industries Corporation, Hanjin Heavy Industries		2-53, 2-93~2-95 (4 trains, 40 cars)	Seoul Subway Line 2	2020	Chopper controls.; Train 2-53 (renumbered to 2-14) was built in 1993 and uses MELCO propulsion systems.; Trains 2-93~2-95 were built in 1994 and use GEC propulsion systems.
Korail Class 1000 (third generation)	Korail	1994–1997; Daewoo Heavy Industries, Hyundai Precision & Industries Corporation, Hanjin Heavy Industries		1-74~1-81, 1-83~1-86 (11 trains, 110 cars)	Seoul Subway Line 1	2015–2020	Rheostat controls.; Expected to retire in 2022, but immediately retired in April 2020 due to a derailment involving train 1-83.
Wide-width car (second batch)	Seoul Metro Corporation, Seoul Metro	1989–1993; Daewoo Heavy Industries		Line 2: 2-78~2-92; Line 3: 3-34~3-35, 3-45~3-48 (21 trains, 210 cars)	Seoul Subway Line 2 Seoul Subway Line 3	Line 2 trains: 2020; Line 3 trains: 2022	GEC propulsion systems.; Line 2 trains 2-85~2-92 and all Line 3 trains originally ran on Line 4 as trains 455/456~481/482.; Line 2 trains 2-78~2-84 originally ran on Line 3 as trains 381/382~393/394.; Line 3 trains originally ran on Line 4 as trains 471/472~481/482.; Six cars in trains 2-78~2-84 and two cars in train 3-48 were manufactured in 1991 by Hanjin Heavy Industries.; Line 2 trains retired in 2020, while Line 3 trains retired in September 2022.
Wide-width car (second batch)	Seoul Metro Corporation, Seoul Metro	1990–1993 (rebuilt 2010); Daewoo Heavy Industries		3-16~3-20, 3-41~3-44 (9 trains, 90 cars)	Seoul Subway Line 3	2022	GEC propulsion systems.; Created from newer cars (built from 1990 to 1993) that were used to extend first generation wide-width trains 10 cars.; All trains retired in September 2022.
Seoul Metro 2000 series (first generation, newer cars, rheostat)	Seoul Metro Corporation, Seoul Metro	1990, 1993 (rebuilt 2005); Hanjin Heavy Industries		2-45~2-48, 2-56 (5 trains, 28 cars)	Seoul Subway Line 2	2023	Created from newer cars (built in 1990 and 1993) that were used to extend first generation trains 2-01~2-05 and 2-09 to 6 or 10 cars.; Trains 2-45~2-48 are 6 cars long and run on the Sinjeong Branch shuttle service.; Train 2-45 uses unpowered cars (built in 1990) salvaged from first generation train 2-09 in 2005.; Trains 2-46~2-48 use unpowered cars (built in 1993) salvaged from first generation trains 2-61~2-75 in 2008. They originally used unpowered cars (built in 1986) salvaged from first generation trains 2-01, 2-04, and 2-05.; Train 2-56 was 4 cars ran on the Seongsu Branch shuttle service.; Seongsu Branch trains retired.; All Sinjeong Branch trains retired in 2023.
Korail Class 341000 (first generation)	Korail	1993, 1996; Daewoo Heavy Industries, Hyundai Precision & Industries Corporation, Hanjin Heavy Industries		341-01~341-25 (25 trains, 250 cars)	Seoul Subway Line 4	2023	Formerly numbered 2-30~2-46, 2-49, 2-51~2-54, and 2-70~2-72.; Train 341-04 utilised all non-driving cars from Class 311000 train 311-01, and several trains utilised some non-driving cars from Class 311000 train 311-02.; Train 341-02 is retired because of various issues, and train 341-23 was retired after an accident at Sanggye station.; All trains retired by December 2023.
Korail Class 351000 (first generation)	Korail	1993, 1996, 1999; Daewoo Heavy Industries, Hyundai Precision & Industries Corporation		351-01~351-22 (22 trains, 220 cars)	Suin–Bundang Line	2024	Formerly numbered 2-47~2-48, 2-50, 2-55~2-69, and 2-73~2-76.; Relegated to service between Cheongnyangni and Gosaek.; All trains retired by June 2024.
Korail Class 3000 (first generation)	Korail	1995–1997; Hyundai Precision & Industries Corporation		3-71~3-86 (16 trains, 160 cars)	Seoul Subway Line 3	2024	All trains were operated by Korail but managed by Seoul Metro's Jichuk depot.; All trains retired by August 2024.
Korail Class 341000 (second generation)	Korail	1999; KOROS		341-26~341-30 (5 trains, 50 cars)	Seoul Subway Line 4	2024	Formerly numbered 2-77~2-81.; Train 341-26 was retrofitted with IGBT systems.; All trains retired by December 2024.

=== Seoul Metro Line 9 Corporation (Metro 9) ===
All trains on Line 9 are six cars long, although many were initially built with four cars.

Seoul Metro (Line 9 Corporation) 9000-series

- First batch (2008) – trains 01~24
  - Newer cars for extending trains to six cars built in 2018.
- Second batch (2011) – trains 25~36
  - Newer cars for extending trains to six cars built in 2017.
- Third batch (2016) – trains 37-45
- Fourth batch (2023) – trains 46-53
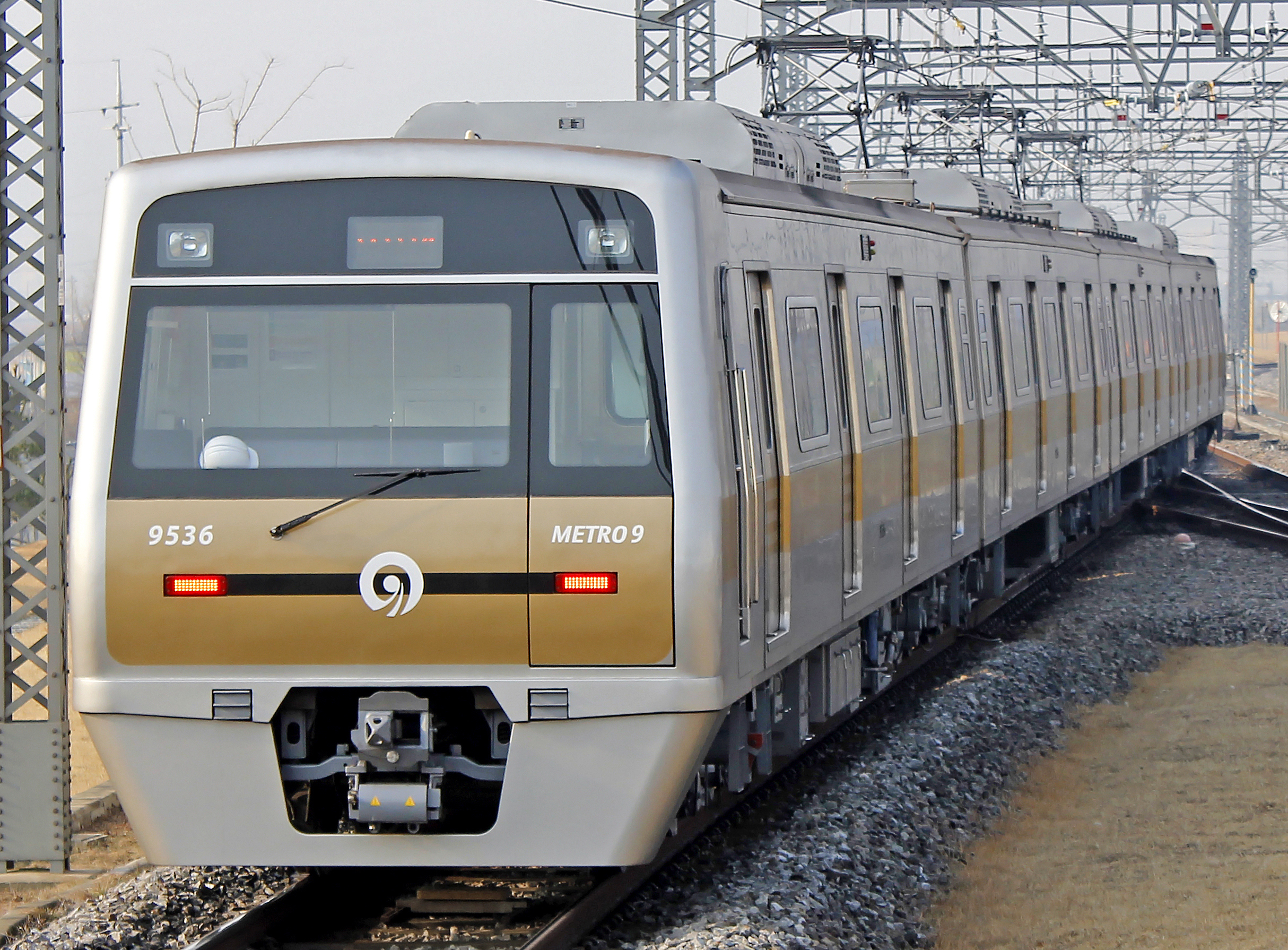
9000-series EMU for Line 9

=== NeoTrans Co. Ltd. ===
Shinbundang Line D000-series (Hyundai Rotem):

- First batch (2010-2011): D001~D012
- Second batch (2014-2015): D013~D020
- Third batch (2020): D021~D023

These trains are controlled by ATO; they are controlled by a computer system on board the train.

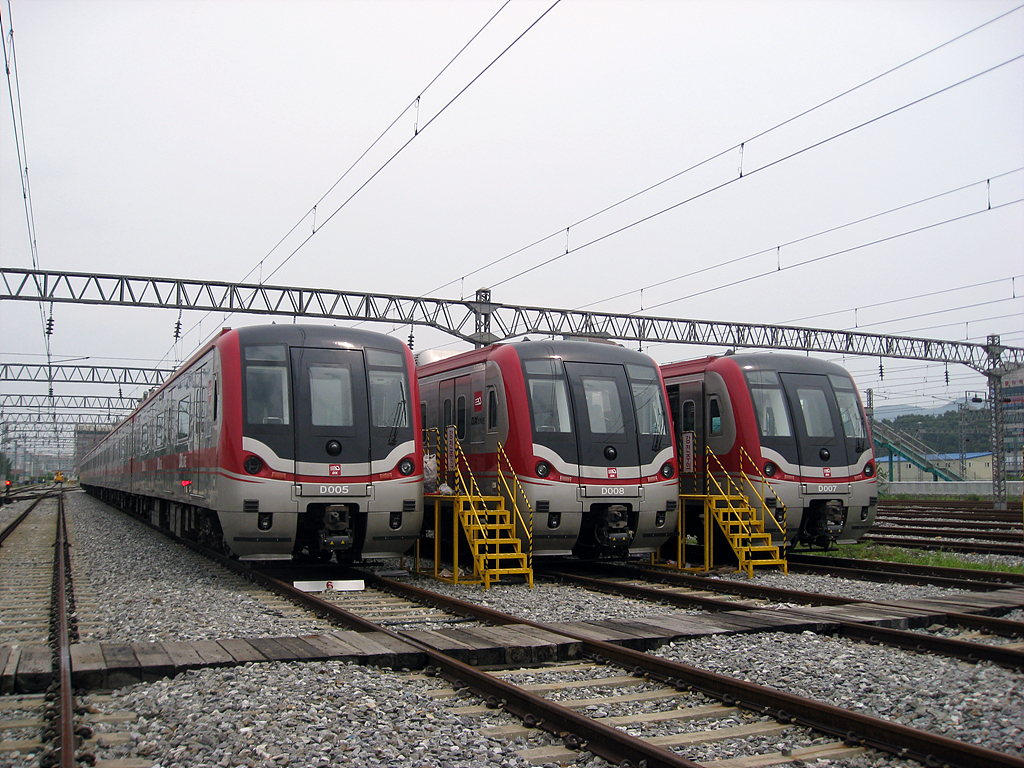
D000 series VVVF inverter controlled EMU

=== Korail Airport Railroad Co., Ltd. ===
- AREX 1000 series
  - VVVF inverter controlled electric car
- AREX 2000 series
  - VVVF inverter controlled electric car
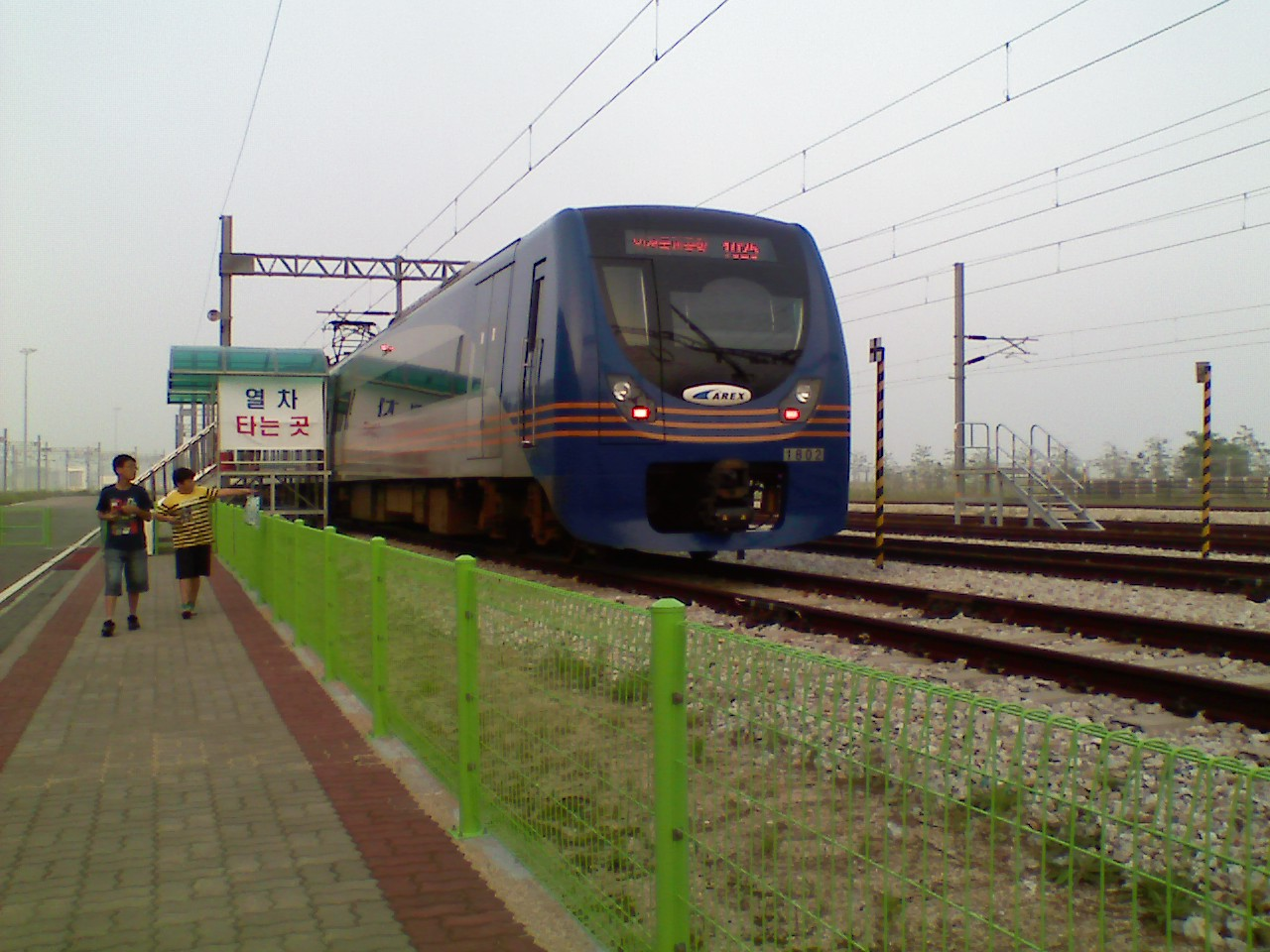
AREX 1000 series

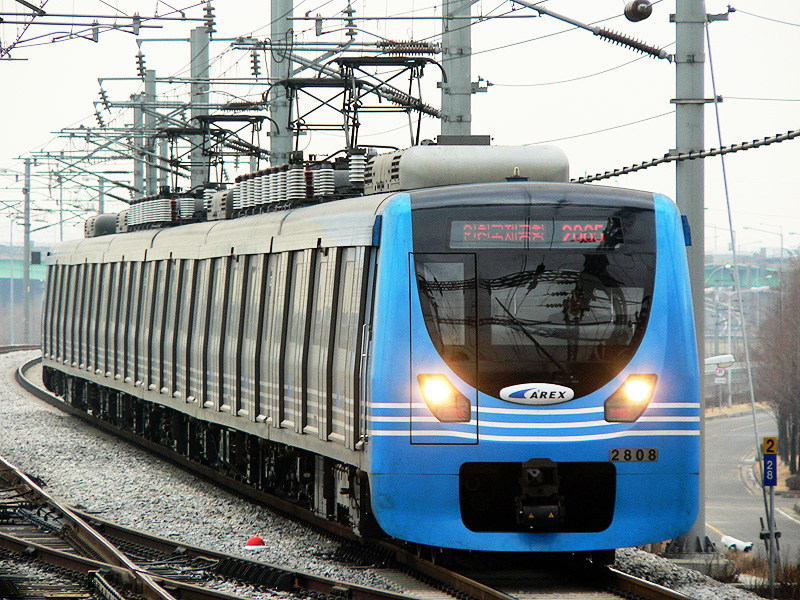
AREX 2000 series
