= Seoul Metropolitan Subway stations =

Subway stations in South Korea

Although each station of the Seoul Metropolitan Subway differs, most share certain characteristics. Stations range in size, from tiny local stations to large transportation hubs.

== Subway exit/entrances ==
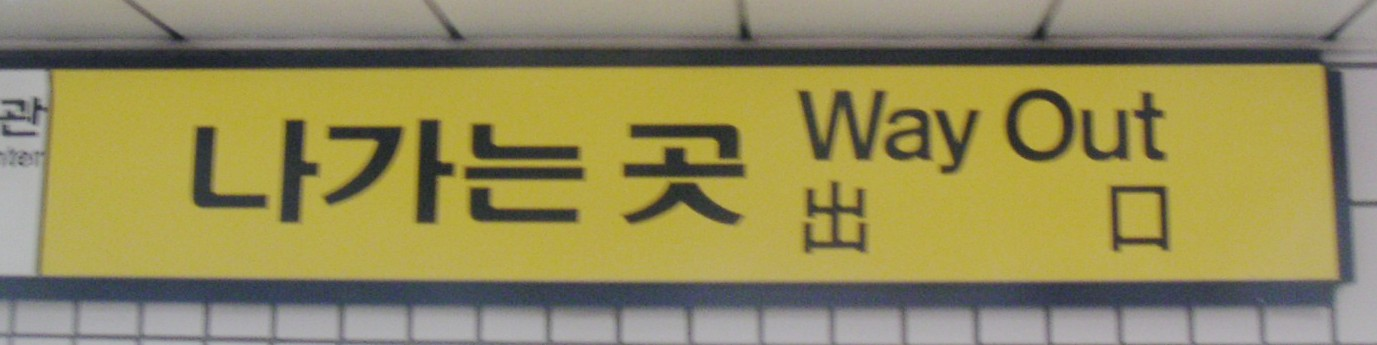
Way Out – Exit sign in Seoul, South Korea

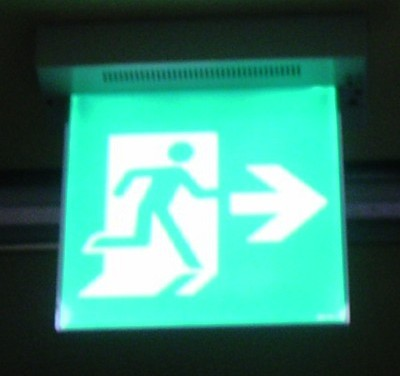
Emergency Exit Light – Seoul, South Korea

Outside each station, entrances are marked with a tall obelisk that has the station's name and station number printed on it below a small subway logo. Inside the station exits are marked with the uniquely translated "Way Out" and is assigned a number, depicted on signs in black with a black circle around the number. Station exits can be a significant distance away from each other at ground level, so it's important to know the exit number you want to take. Every station has detailed maps of the station and surrounding area showing the locations of each exit.

Emergency exits are marked with a green sign that depict visually a person running out of a door.

== Main area ==
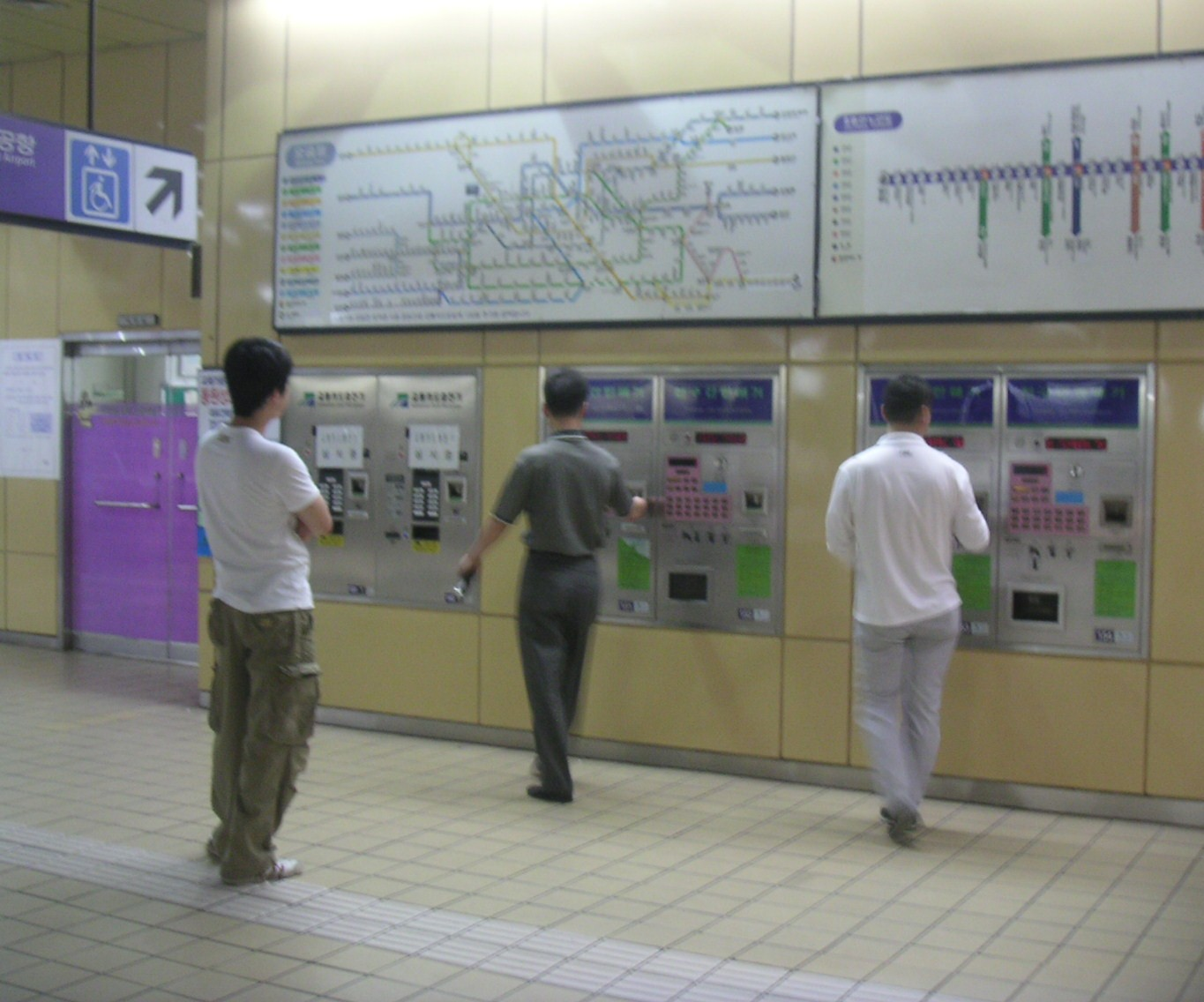
Ticket Machines – Seoul, South Korea

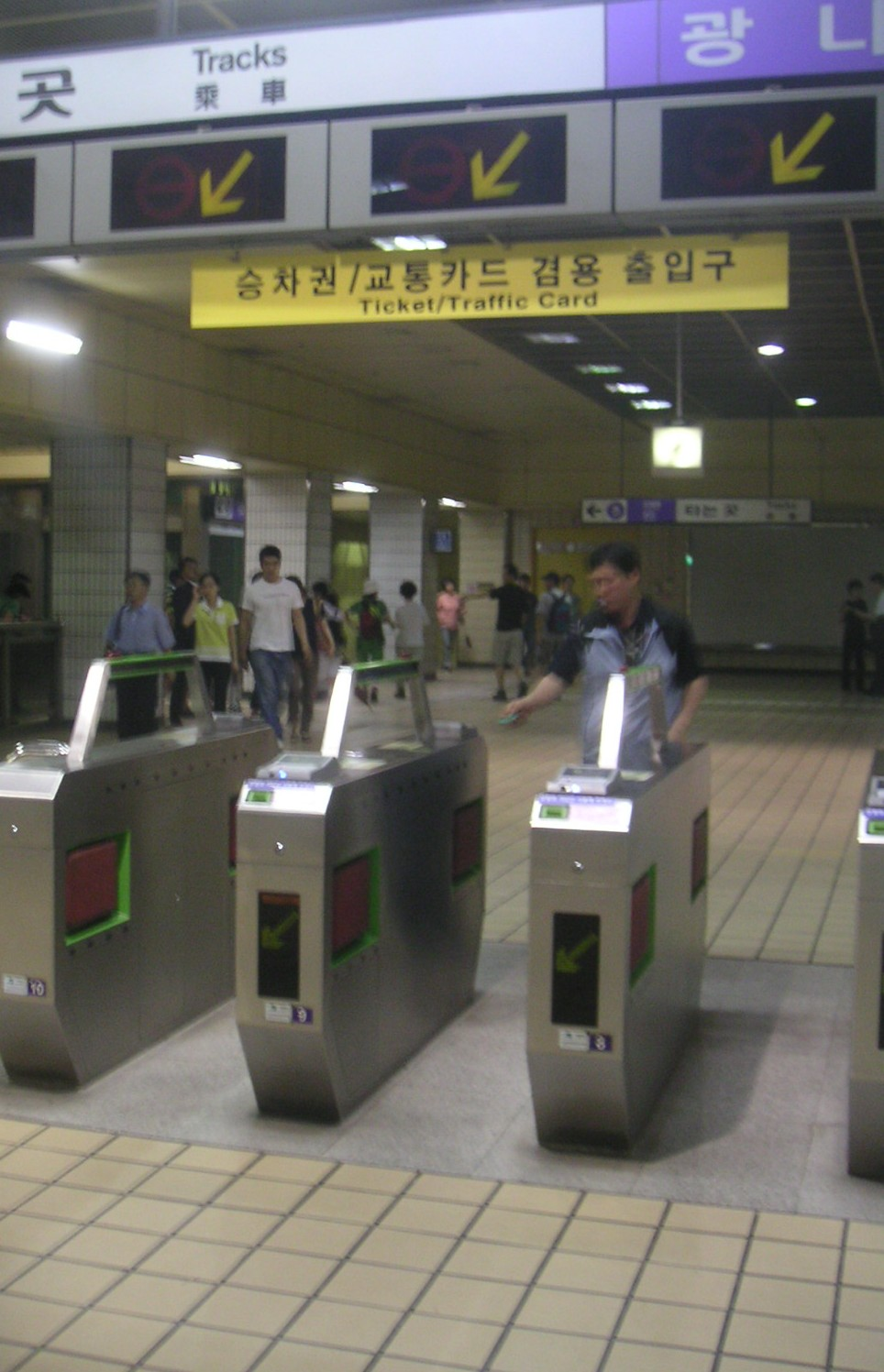
A ticket gate – Seoul, South Korea

The main area of any station has a ticket counter where tickets are purchased and T-Money transportation cards are recharged. A row of automatic ticket dispensing machines offer tickets. There had been ticket-sellers, at every station, but to cut expenses and protect the environment, Korail abolished paper tickets. Since then, people who do not have T-money have to get plastic electronic tickets from the machines. When you arrive at your destination, there are also refund machines, which return \500, that you paid with your ticket price. Maps above the ticket dispensing machines explain the cost for each destination in the system; prices are charged by how far the user rides. These main areas of the station are often decorated with art, and often feature a fish tank. Also, a "library" area is common, with books and chairs for people waiting to meet someone. Each main area leads to at least one ticket gate. In order to enter or exit ticket gates, riders must insert a ticket, or scan a T-Money card against the card pad.

== Accessibility of stations ==
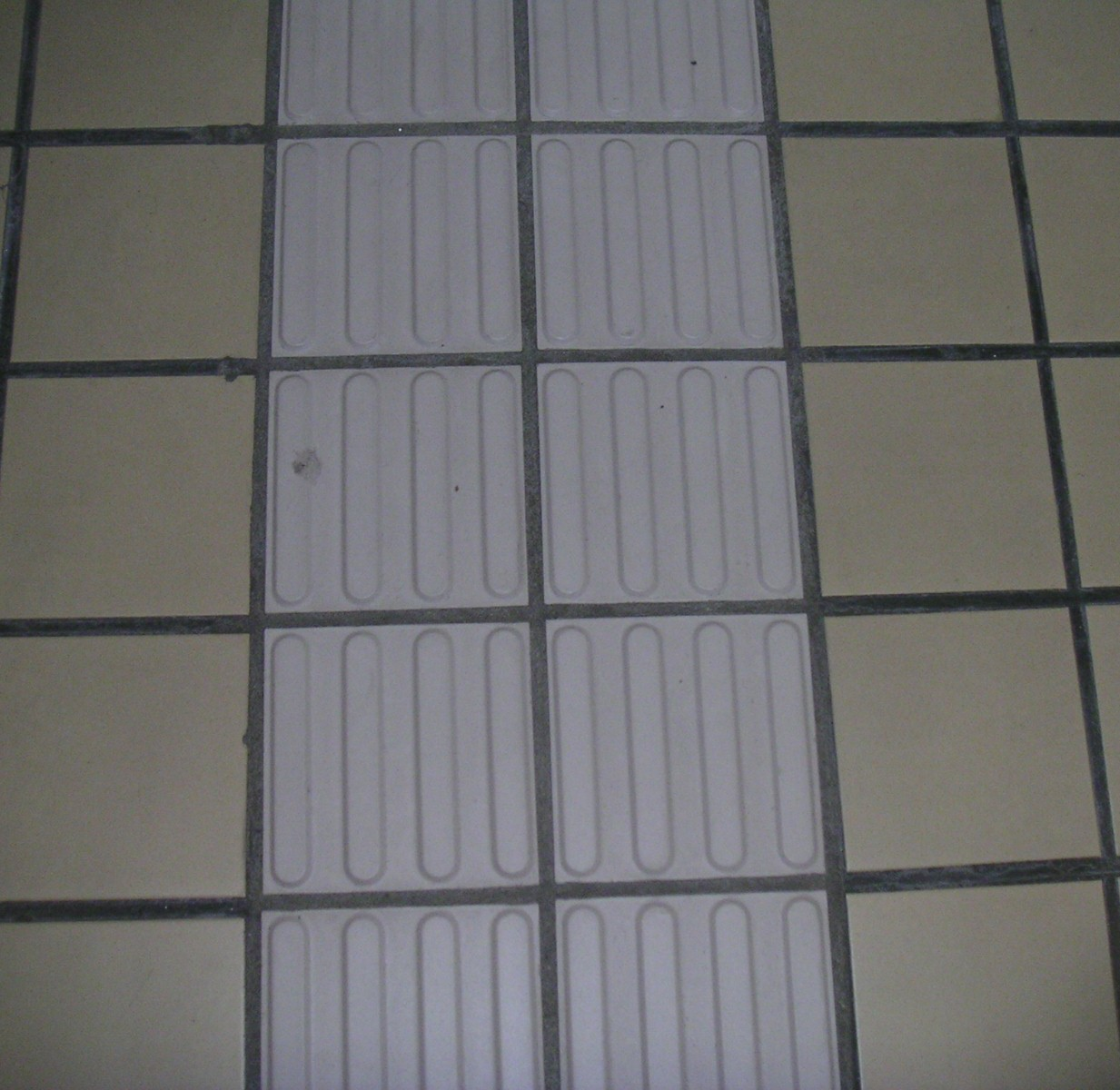
Guided path for riders who are visually impaired – Seoul, South Korea

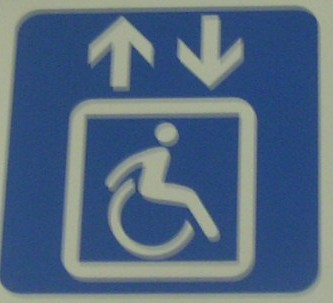
Common sign for wheel chair elevators – Seoul, South Korea

Travel around stations for visually impaired riders is enhanced by a guided path. These paths are usually bright yellow, but range in color and can be seen in other colors such as silver, as well. The path is raised, allowing visually impaired riders to follow the path to the exit or the train. For riders needing wheelchair access, many stations have elevators, marked with a special symbol, or devices that allow wheel chair users to ride up and down stairs. Korean Braille can also be found at the base of stairs, in front of restrooms, and some other places.

== Platforms ==
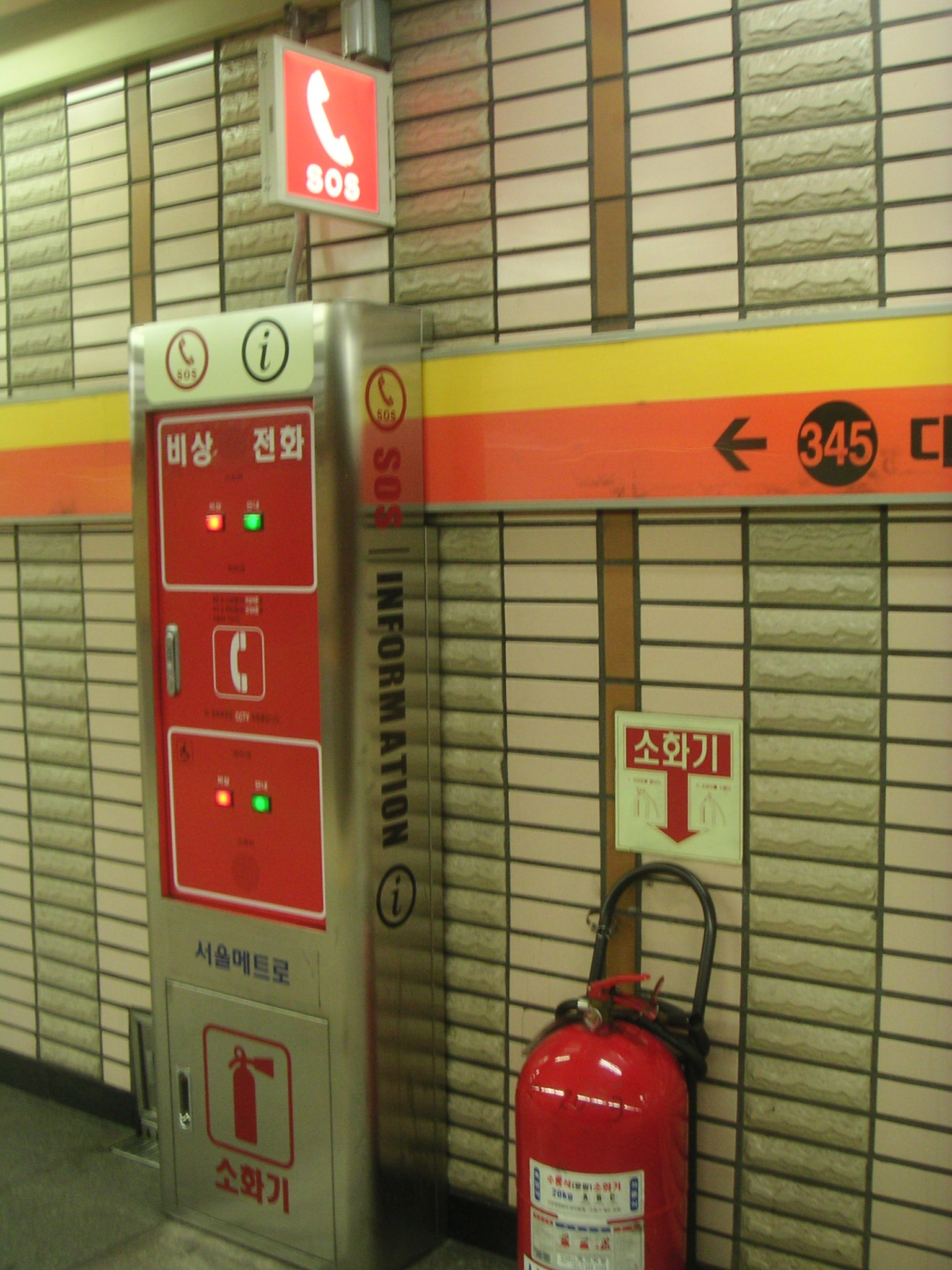
Emergency Telephone with Information line. Green Button for information, Red Button for help.

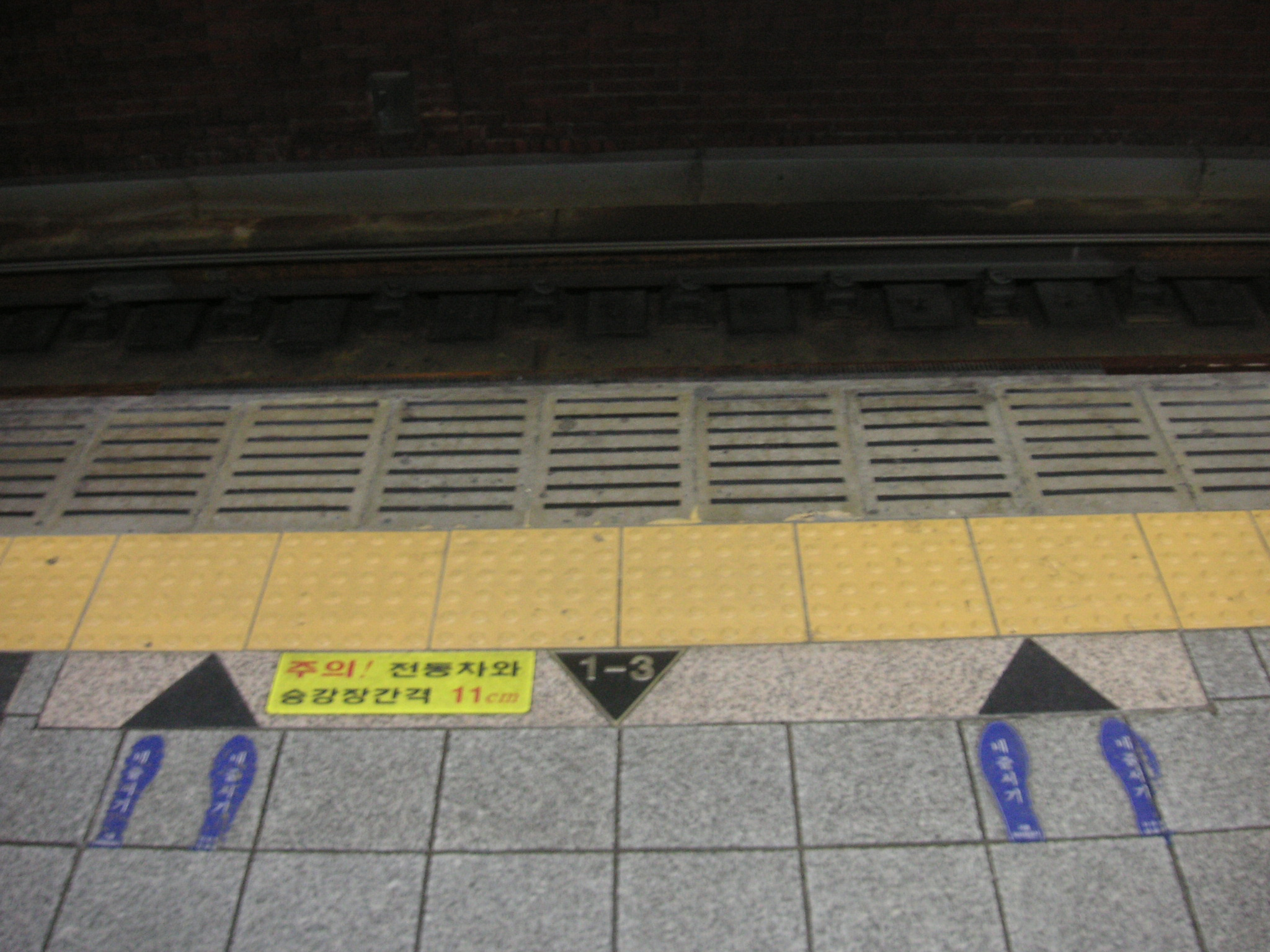
The 3 arrows mentioned in the text to the left. Notice the central triangle with number on it.

Around one foot from the edge of platform, the floor is marked with a yellow safety line (usually bumped, as described above). Along this line, the locations of each doorway of each carriage are marked with 3 arrows or triangles. The central triangle indicates that disembarking passengers should leave from the center of the door, while the two arrows on the sides indicate that boarding passengers should form two lines at the sides while waiting for the train. Although courtesy requires riders to wait for exiting passengers before entering the train, it is not uncommon for this to be somewhat ignored. Each boarding location is also numbered with the carriage and door number, and passengers use this information to position themselves at the ideal location for transferring to another line, or their desired exit at their destination station.

Recently terrorist concerns have increased precautions against any attacks. Larger stations have cabinets with disposable gas masks, and a new phone has been installed. The phone has two buttons, the red button connects directly to the emergency response system and the green button connects to an information service.

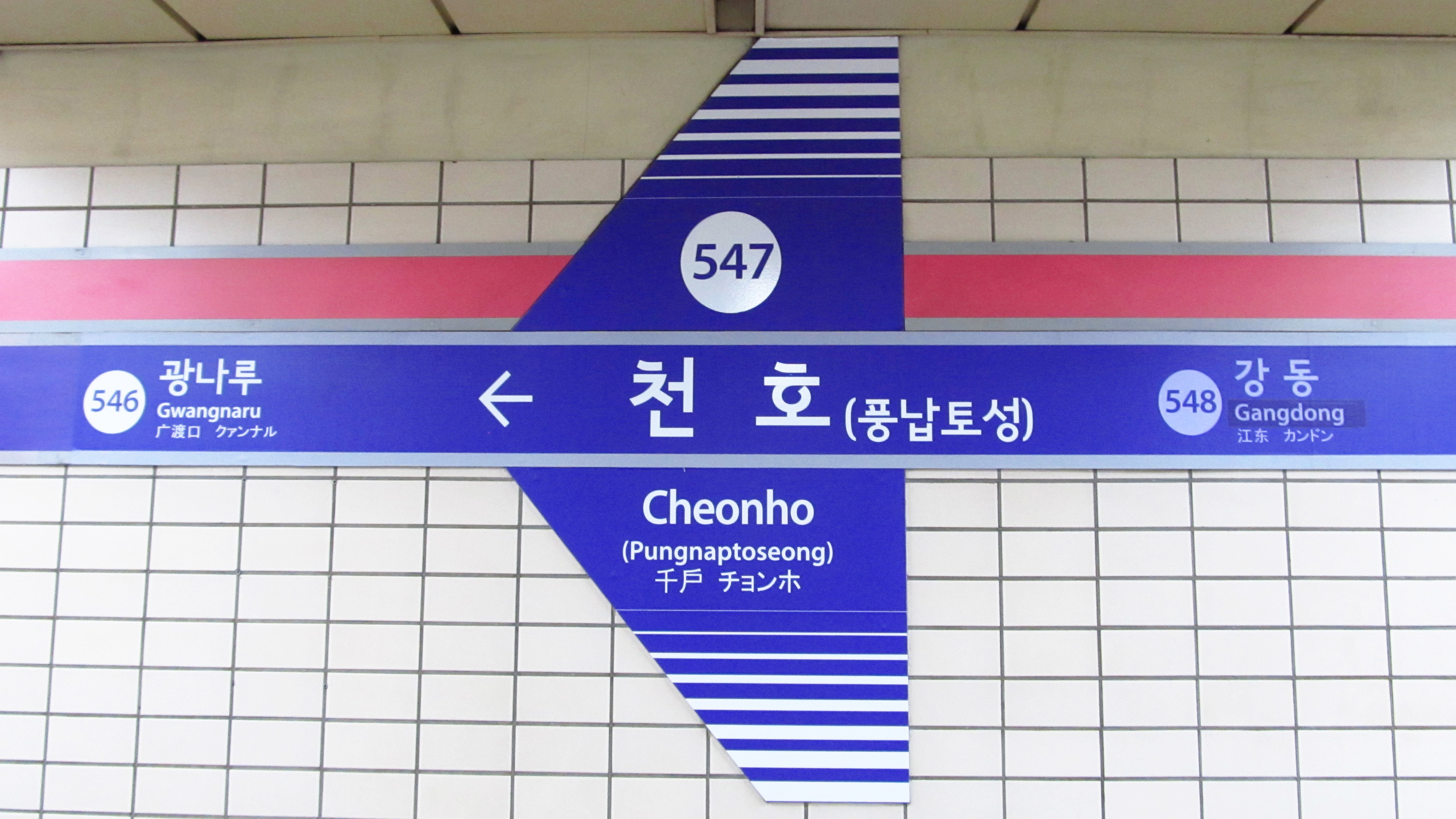
Station Sign – Seoul, South Korea

Platform walls are marked with a thick line, of the color of the train line, along with the name of current, next (and sometimes previous) station and an arrow indicating the train's direction. Each station also has a unique number, and its name, written in hangul, Roman characters, and Chinese characters. If the rider can transfer to another train line, that color is represented as a thinner horizontal stripe above, or below, the station's color.

== See also ==
- T-money transportation cards
- Seoul Metropolitan Subway rolling stock
