= Sung Shin Rolling Stock Technology =

South Korean machinery manufacturer

Sung Shin Rolling Stock Technology Limited
- Native name: 성신RST
- Type: Private
- Industry: Railways
- Founded: April 20, 1990; 36 years ago
- Headquarters: Haman, Gyeongsangnam-do, South Korea
- Key people: Park, Gye-Chul (President, CEO)
- Products: Railway vehicles
- Revenue: ₩80,669,077,122 (2025)
- Operating income: ₩10,412,974,209 (2025)
- Net income: ₩4,000,842,946 (2025)
- Total assets: ₩70,489,858,896 (2025)
- Total equity: ₩40,057,632,669 (2025)
- Number of employees: 167 (2022)
- Website: http://ssrst.com/en/

- Sung Shin Rolling Stock Technology
- Hangul: 성신RST
- Hanja: 成信RST
- RR: Seongsin RST
- MR: Sŏngsin RST

Sung Shin Rolling Stock Technology, also stylized as Sung Shin RST (Korean: 성신RST), is a South Korean rolling stock and equipment manufacturing company.

== History ==
The company was founded in 1990 as Sung Shin Industrial Company (Korean: 성신산업; Hanja: 成信産業). In 1994, the company changed its name to Sung Shin Industrial Company, Limited and again in 2009 in its current one, to indicate its focus on railway systems such as bogies, locomotives, coaches, and systems integrator in the international stage. The company's rolling stocks were exported to the Middle East, Africa, South Asia, and South America.

In October 2022, after the company signed a contract worth a total of $70 million to export 81 units, including 59 semi-high-speed trains and 22 narrow-gauge passenger trains, to Tanzania Railways from 2021 to 2022, Tanzanian Prime Minister Kassim Majaliwa visited Sungshin RST's 2nd Mungyeong Plant.

== Products ==
Notable projects include supplying some of South Korea's maintenance vehicles, rehabilitation of KTX trains and passenger coaches.

=== Rail ===
==== Domestic ====
- KNR/Korail and DJET Inspection Cars
- KNR/Korail Track Inspection Vehicle
- Diesel Hydraulic Locomotives (Shung Shin Cement, Hyundai Rotem, Hyundai Steel, POSCO, Seoul Metro, and High One)
- Korail Freight Wagons
- Korail Sleeping Coaches
- Haeundae Beach Battery-Electric Tram

==== International ====
- Diesel Locomotives (Saudi Arabia, Thailand)
- Passenger Coaches (Gabon, Tunisia, Tanzania SGR, Republic of Congo, Bangladesh Railways)
- Bogies (Philippines DOST Hybrid Electric Train, Malaysia)

== See also ==
- Economy of South Korea
- Hyundai Rotem
- Dawonsys
- Woojin Industrial Systems
