= Dawonsys =

South Korean machinery manufacturer

Dawonsys Company Limited
- Native name: 다원시스
- Type: Public
- Traded as: KRX: 068240
- Industry: Railways; Display/Semiconductors; Factories
- Founded: January 9, 1996; 30 years ago
- Headquarters: Ansan, Gyeonggi-do, South Korea
- Key people: Park Seon-sun (CEO)
- Products: Railway vehicles Fusion Power Supply and Accelerator; Display/Semiconductor; Plant/Intelligent Welding; Environment-Friendly Systems
- Revenue: Consolidated: ₩112,089,010,367 (2025); Separate: ₩76,920,922,755 (2025)
- Operating income: Consolidated: -₩120,677,503,877 (2025); Separate: -₩108,140,868,233 (2025)
- Net income: Consolidated: -₩196,858,061,550 (2025); Separate: -₩192,430,743,004 (2025)
- Total assets: Consolidated: ₩615,943,516,770 (2025); Separate: ₩609,360,705,913 (2025)
- Total equity: Consolidated: -₩515,641,966,971 (2025); Separate: -₩490,718,140,985 (2025)
- Number of employees: 515 (2025)
- Website: http://dawonsys.com/en/

- Dawonsys
- Hangul: 다원시스
- Hanja: 多元시스
- RR: Dawonsiseu
- MR: Tawŏnsisŭ

Dawonsys (Korean: 다원시스) is a South Korean company manufacturing rolling stock, display, semiconductor, plant equipment, and environmental systems. It changed its name to the current one in May 2001 to reflect its parent company.

== History ==
The company was founded in 1996. In 2001, the company changed its name to its current one, aligning itself towards the parent company. The company then announced the acquisition of its competitor Rowin Corporation in 2016 and subsequently absorbed in February 2017. Dawonsys currently employs 261 and exports to countries worldwide.

== Products ==
Notable projects include supplying some of South Korea's rolling stock, which includes several electric multiple units for some lines in Seoul Metro.

=== Rail ===
- Seoul Subway Line 2 - Seoul Metro 2000 series (fourth generation)
- Seoul Subway Line 3 - Seoul Metro 3000 series (second generation)
- Seoul Subway Line 4 - Seoul Metro 4000 series (third generation)
- Seoul Subway Line 7 - Seoul Metro SR-series
- ITX-Maum - Korail Class 220000 main line electric train (EMU)

== Controversy ==
In April 2026, Korail, the Seoul Metropolitan Subway, and the Incheon Subway issued contract terminations totalling 972 cars owing to lengthy delays with respect to their delivery schedules. This has resulted in the temporary suspension of the company's stock listing on the Korea Exchange.

== See also ==
- Economy of South Korea
- Hyundai Rotem
- Woojin Industrial Systems
- Sung Shin Rolling Stock Technology
