= Seoul Metro 2000 series (first generation) =

South Korean train type

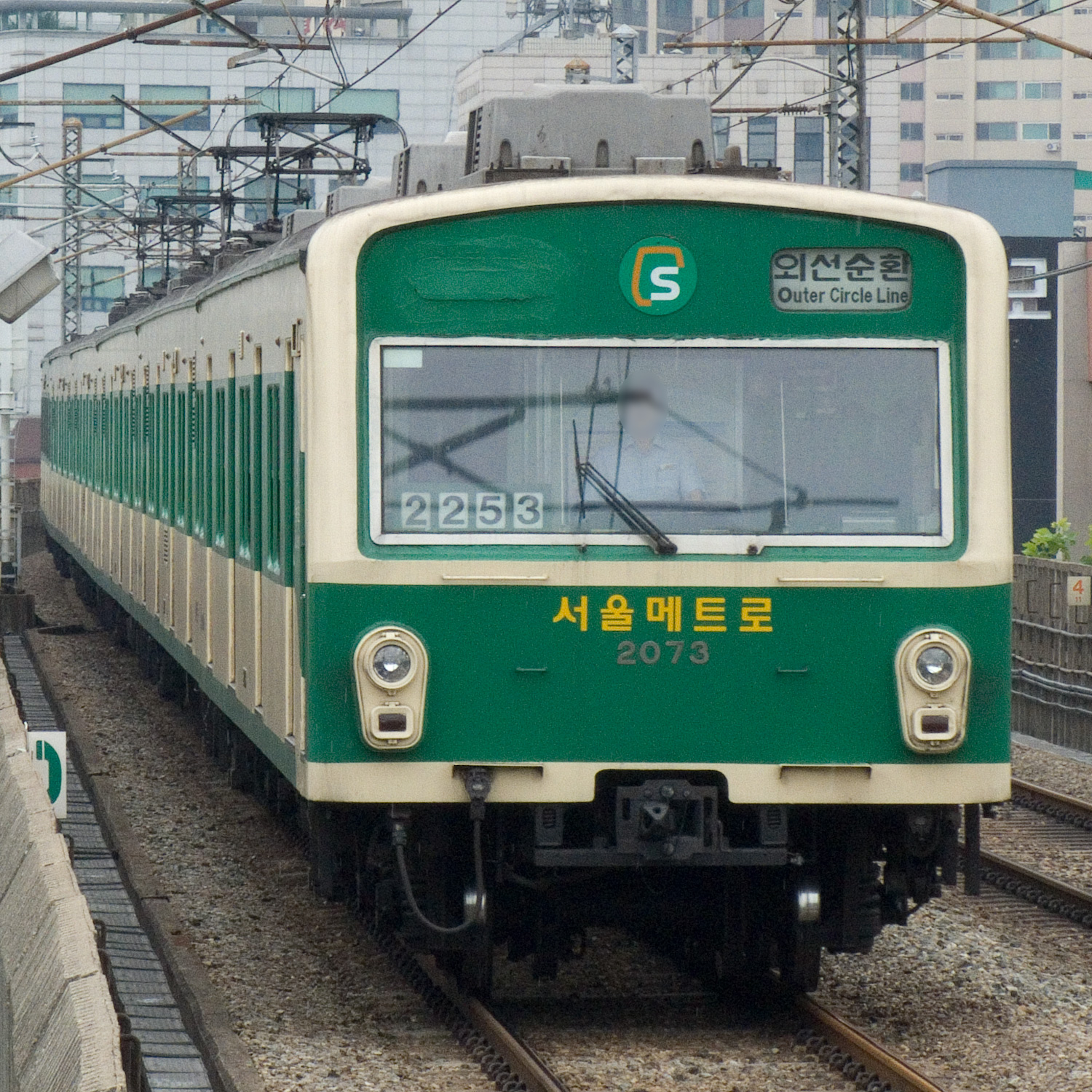
- First generation set 273

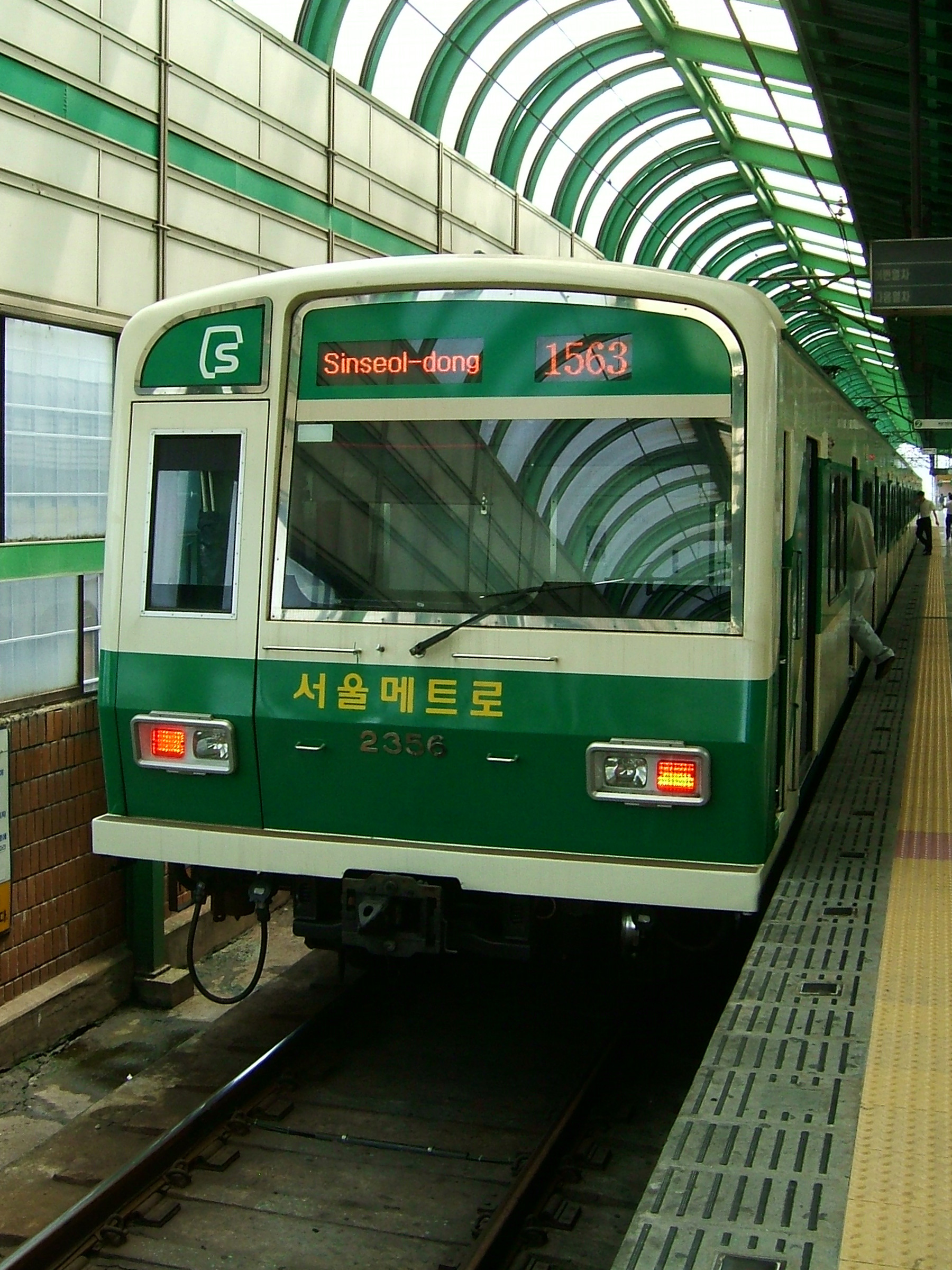
- Rebuilt first generation set 256
- In service: 1980-2023
- Manufacturers: Nippon Sharyo, Hyundai Precision & Industries, Daewoo Heavy Industries, Hanjin Heavy Industries
- Constructed: 1st batch: 1980-1984; 2nd batch: 1986; 3rd batch: 1989-1991; 4th batch: 1992-1994
- Entered service: 1980
- Number built: 664: 1st batch: 248 (54 trains); 2nd batch: 64 (additional cars); 3rd batch: 200 (13 trains/additional cars); 4th batch: 152 (4 trains/additional cars)
- Number in service: 0
- Number preserved: 11
- Number scrapped: 647
- Successor: Seoul Metro 2000 series (2005)
- Formation: Main Line; 10 cars per trainset; Seongsu Branch; 4 cars per trainset; Sinjeong Branch; 6 cars per trainset
- Operator: Seoul Metro
- Depot: Sinjeong
- Line served: Seoul Subway Line 2

Specifications
- Car body construction: Aluminum
- Train length: 195 m (639 ft 9 in)
- Car length: 19.5 m (64 ft 0 in)
- Width: 3.16 m (10 ft 4 in)
- Doors: 8 per car, 4 per side
- Maximum speed: 110 km/h (68 mph) (design)
- Traction system: MMC-HTB-20R series-parallel combination rheostat, Melco armature thyristor chopper control, or GEC-Alsthom armature thyristor chopper control
- Traction motors: DC
- Deceleration: 3.5 km/(h⋅s) (2.2 mph/s); 4.5 km/(h⋅s) (2.8 mph/s)(emergency)
- Electric systems: 1,500 V DC overhead catenary
- Current collection: Pantograph
- Braking system: air
- Safety system: ATS
- Track gauge: 1,435 mm (4 ft 8 1/2 in) standard gauge

The first-generation Seoul Metro 2000-series was a class of South Korean electrical multiple unit trains manufactured by Nippon Sharyo, Hyundai Precision & Industries, Daewoo Heavy Industries, and Hanjin Heavy Industries between 1983 and 1994 for Seoul Subway Line 2.

== Preservation ==
After retirement, a handful of first generation 2000-series cars were either preserved or repurposed.

- 1st batch car 2007 - preserved at the Daegu Safety Theme Park as a fire safety exhibit. The car was renumbered to 2046 before its retirement.
- 1st batch car 2012 - preserved at the National Fire Service Training Center as a training car. The car was renumbered to 2058 before its retirement.
- 2nd batch cars 2222, 2223, 2225, 2233, and 2333 - exported to Vietnam and used on the Hanoi–Đồng Đăng railway as push-pull coaches.
- 3rd batch car 2545 - used for training at Seoul Fire Academy. The car was renumbered to 2906 before its retirement.
- 3rd batch cars 2210, 2310, 2610, 2710, and 2744 - preserved at the old Gyeonggang station and used as an excursion train for the Hyunmoo Resort.

== See also ==
- 2014 Seoul subway crash – involved two first-generation 2000 series trains
- Rail transport in South Korea
