= Seoul Metro 2000 series (2005) =

South Korean train type

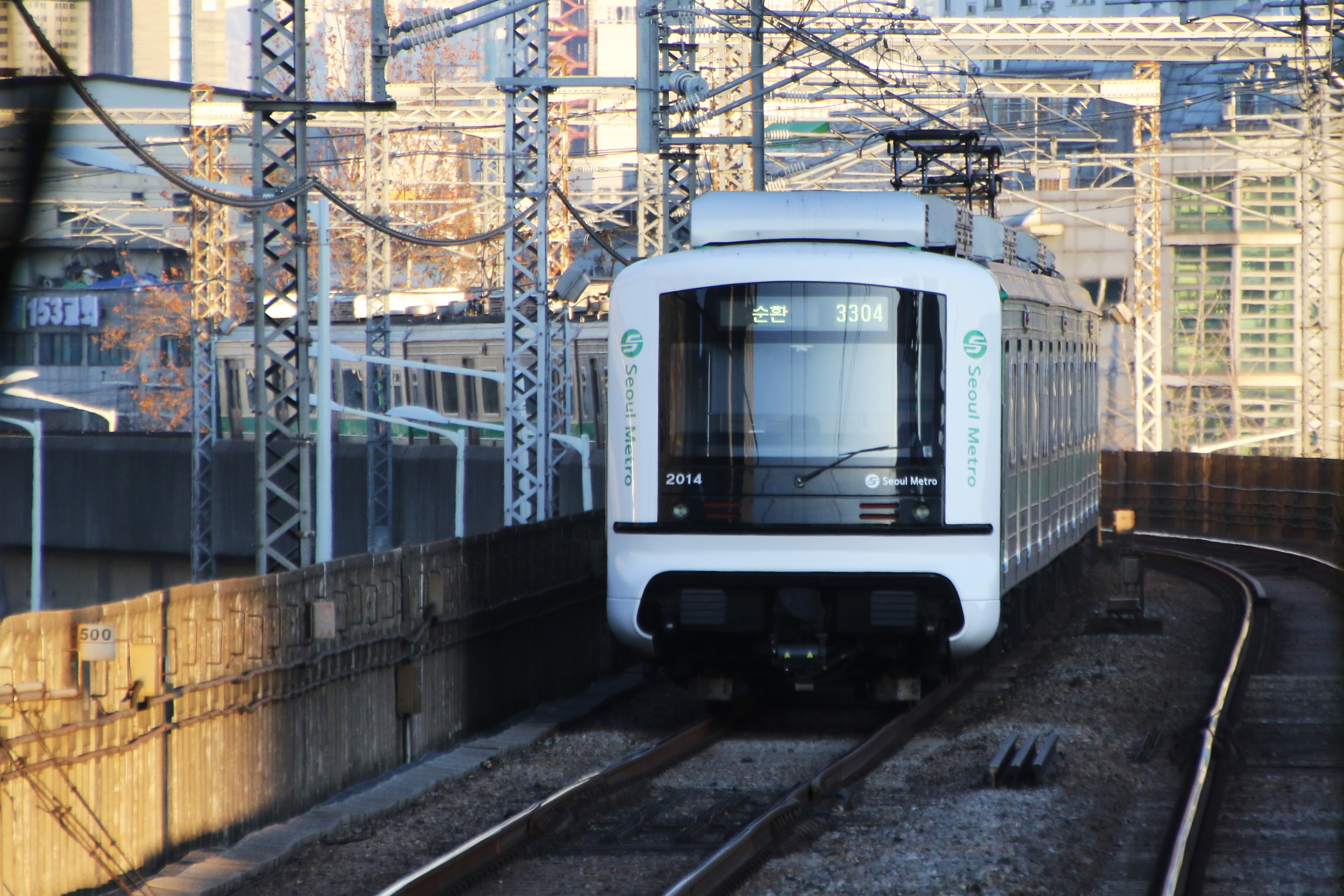
- Seoul Metro 2000 series 4th batch set 214
- Manufacturers: Hyundai Rotem (1st/2nd/4th batch); Dawonsys (3rd/5th batch)
- Built at: Changwon, South Korea (Hyundai Rotem); Gimcheon, South Korea (Dawonsys)
- Replaced: First generation 2000 series
- Constructed: 2005 (1st batch); 2007–2008 (2nd batch); 2017–2018 (3rd batch); 2019–2020 (4th batch); 2020–2021 (5th batch)
- Entered service: 2005-Present
- Number built: 1st batch: 54 (6 trains); 2nd batch: 302 (32 trains); 3rd batch: 200 (20 trains); 4th batch: 214 (22 trains); 5th batch: 22 (intermediate unpowered cars); 24 (4 six-car sets)
- Number in service: 726 (75 trains)
- Formation: Main Line; 10 cars per trainset TC-MC-MC-TC-MC-TC-TC-MC-MC-TC; Seongsu Branch; 4 cars per trainset TC-MC-MC-TC; Sinjeong Branch; 6 cars per trainset TC-MC-MC-TC-MC-TC
- Operator: Seoul Metro
- Depots: Sinjeong, Gunja
- Line served: Seoul Subway Line 2

Specifications
- Car body construction: Stainless steel
- Train length: 195 m (639 ft 9 in)
- Car length: 19.5 m (64 ft 0 in)
- Width: 3.16 m (10 ft 4 in)
- Doors: 8 per car, 4 per side
- Maximum speed: 100 km/h (62 mph) (design); 80 km/h (50 mph) (service)
- Traction system: 2-level IGBT-VVVF (Batch 1-2: Mitsubishi Electric w/ Hyundai Rotem IPM, Batch 3 and 5: Dawonsys, Batch 4: Toshiba)
- Traction motors: 3-phase AC induction motor
- Electric systems: 1,500 V DC overhead catenary
- Current collection: Pantograph
- Braking systems: Regenerative, electromagnetic, air
- Safety systems: ATC, ATO
- Track gauge: 1,435 mm (4 ft 8 1/2 in) standard gauge

The second-generation Seoul Metro 2000-series is a South Korean electrical multiple unit train manufactured by Hyundai Rotem and Dawonsys since 2005 for Seoul Metro, operating on Seoul Subway Line 2.

== History ==
In 2004, Seoul Metro ordered a first batch comprising 5 ten-car trains (2-01~2-05) and 1 four-car unit (2-57) from Hyundai Rotem. The trains were delivered in 2005 and replaced aging 1st generation 2000-series trains.

In 2006, Seoul Metro ordered a second batch comprising 29 ten-car trains (2-15~2-31 and 2-61~2-72) and three four-car trains (2-58~2-60) from Hyundai Rotem. The trains were delivered from 2007 to 2008 and replaced aging 1st generation 2000-series trains. Trains 2-23~2-31 and 2-71~2-72 use newer unpowered 1st generation 2000-series cars built between 1991 and 1992, which were retrofitted with technology found in the newer trains.

In 2015, Seoul Metro ordered a third batch comprising 20 ten-car trains (2-06~2-13, 2-39~2-42, 2-85~2-92) from Dawonsys. The design of the carbody changed somewhat. The trains were delivered from 2017 to 2018 and replaced aging 1st generation 2000-series trains and 2nd batch standardized wide-width trains.

In 2017, Seoul Metro ordered a fourth batch comprising 21 ten-car trains (2-14, 2-32~2-38, 2-73~2-84) and one four-car train (2-56) from Hyundai Rotem. The design of the carbody changed once again, and was revealed in July 2018. The trains were delivered from 2019 to 2020 and replaced aging 1st generation 2000-series trains, rebuilt trains formed from newer 1st generation 2000-series cars, and 2nd batch standardized wide-width trains.

In 2018, Seoul Metro ordered a fifth batch comprising four six-car trains (2-45~2-48) and 22 unpowered non-driving cars, from Dawonsys. The design of the carbody is identical to that of the third batch trains. The trains were delivered from 2020 to 2022. The six-car trains replaced the aging rebuilt trains formed from newer 1st generation 2000-series cars, while the 22 unpowered cars will replace the newer 1st generation 2000-series cars in second batch trains.

== Fleet List ==
As of September 2022, the fleet is as follows:

Set number	Date delivered	Status	Remarks
201	2005	In service	
202	2005	In service	
203	2005	In service	
204	2005	In service	
205	2005	In service	
206	2017	In service	
207	2017	In service	
208	2017	In service	
209	2017	In service	
210	2017	In service	
211	2018	In service	
212	2018	In service	
213	2018	In service	
214	2019	In service	
215	2007	In service	
216	2007	In service	
217	2007	In service	
218	2007	In service	
219	2007	In service	
220	2007	In service	Temporarily shortened to 6 cars and assigned to the Sinjeong Branch service to replace another damaged 6-car train.
221	2008	In service	Temporarily shortened to 6 cars and assigned to the Sinjeong Branch service to replace another damaged 6-car train.
222	2008	In service	
223	2007, 2022	In service	These trains utilized first generation 2000 series blind trailer cars as the 4th and 7th cars until 2022, when they were replaced by newer cars built by Dawonsys. Trains 229–231 have dedicated bicycle compartments.
224	2007, 2022	In service	These trains utilized first generation 2000 series blind trailer cars as the 4th and 7th cars until 2022, when they were replaced by newer cars built by Dawonsys. Trains 229–231 have dedicated bicycle compartments.
225	2008, 2022	In service	These trains utilized first generation 2000 series blind trailer cars as the 4th and 7th cars until 2022, when they were replaced by newer cars built by Dawonsys. Trains 229–231 have dedicated bicycle compartments.
226	2008, 2022	In service	These trains utilized first generation 2000 series blind trailer cars as the 4th and 7th cars until 2022, when they were replaced by newer cars built by Dawonsys. Trains 229–231 have dedicated bicycle compartments.
227	2008, 2022	In service	These trains utilized first generation 2000 series blind trailer cars as the 4th and 7th cars until 2022, when they were replaced by newer cars built by Dawonsys. Trains 229–231 have dedicated bicycle compartments.
228	2008, 2022	In service	These trains utilized first generation 2000 series blind trailer cars as the 4th and 7th cars until 2022, when they were replaced by newer cars built by Dawonsys. Trains 229–231 have dedicated bicycle compartments.
229	2008, 2022	In service	These trains utilized first generation 2000 series blind trailer cars as the 4th and 7th cars until 2022, when they were replaced by newer cars built by Dawonsys. Trains 229–231 have dedicated bicycle compartments.
230	2008, 2022	In service	These trains utilized first generation 2000 series blind trailer cars as the 4th and 7th cars until 2022, when they were replaced by newer cars built by Dawonsys. Trains 229–231 have dedicated bicycle compartments.
231	2008, 2022	In service	These trains utilized first generation 2000 series blind trailer cars as the 4th and 7th cars until 2022, when they were replaced by newer cars built by Dawonsys. Trains 229–231 have dedicated bicycle compartments.
232	2019	In service	
233	2019	In service	
234	2019	In service	
235	2019	In service	
236	2019	In service	
237	2019	In service	
238	2019	In service	
239	2018	In service	
240	2018	In service	
241	2018	In service	
242	2018	In service	
245	2020	In service	6-car trains; assigned to the Sinjeong Branch service.
246	2022	In service	6-car trains; assigned to the Sinjeong Branch service.
247	2022	In service	6-car trains; assigned to the Sinjeong Branch service.
248	2022	In service	6-car trains; assigned to the Sinjeong Branch service.
256	2020	In service	4-car trains; assigned to the Seongsu Branch service.
257	2005	In service	4-car trains; assigned to the Seongsu Branch service.
258	2007	In service	4-car trains; assigned to the Seongsu Branch service.
259	2007	In service	4-car trains; assigned to the Seongsu Branch service.
260	2007	In service	4-car trains; assigned to the Seongsu Branch service.
261	2008	In service	
262	2008	In service	
263	2008	In service	
264	2008	In service	
265	2008	In service	
266	2008	In service	
267	2008	In service	
268	2008	In service	
269	2008	In service	
270	2008	In service	
271	2008	In service	These trains utilized first generation 2000 series blind trailer cars as the 4th and 7th cars until 2022, when they were replaced by newer cars built by Dawonsys.
272	2008	In service	These trains utilized first generation 2000 series blind trailer cars as the 4th and 7th cars until 2022, when they were replaced by newer cars built by Dawonsys.
273	2019	In service	
274	2019	In service	
275	2020	In service	
276	2020	In service	
277	2020	In service	
278	2020	In service	
279	2020	In service	
280	2020	In service	
281	2020	In service	
282	2020	In service	
283	2020	In service	
284	2020	In service	
285	2018	In service	
286	2018	In service	
287	2018	In service	
288	2018	In service	
289	2018	In service	
290	2018	In service	
291	2018	In service	
292	2018	In service	
293	2020	In service	

== Gallery ==
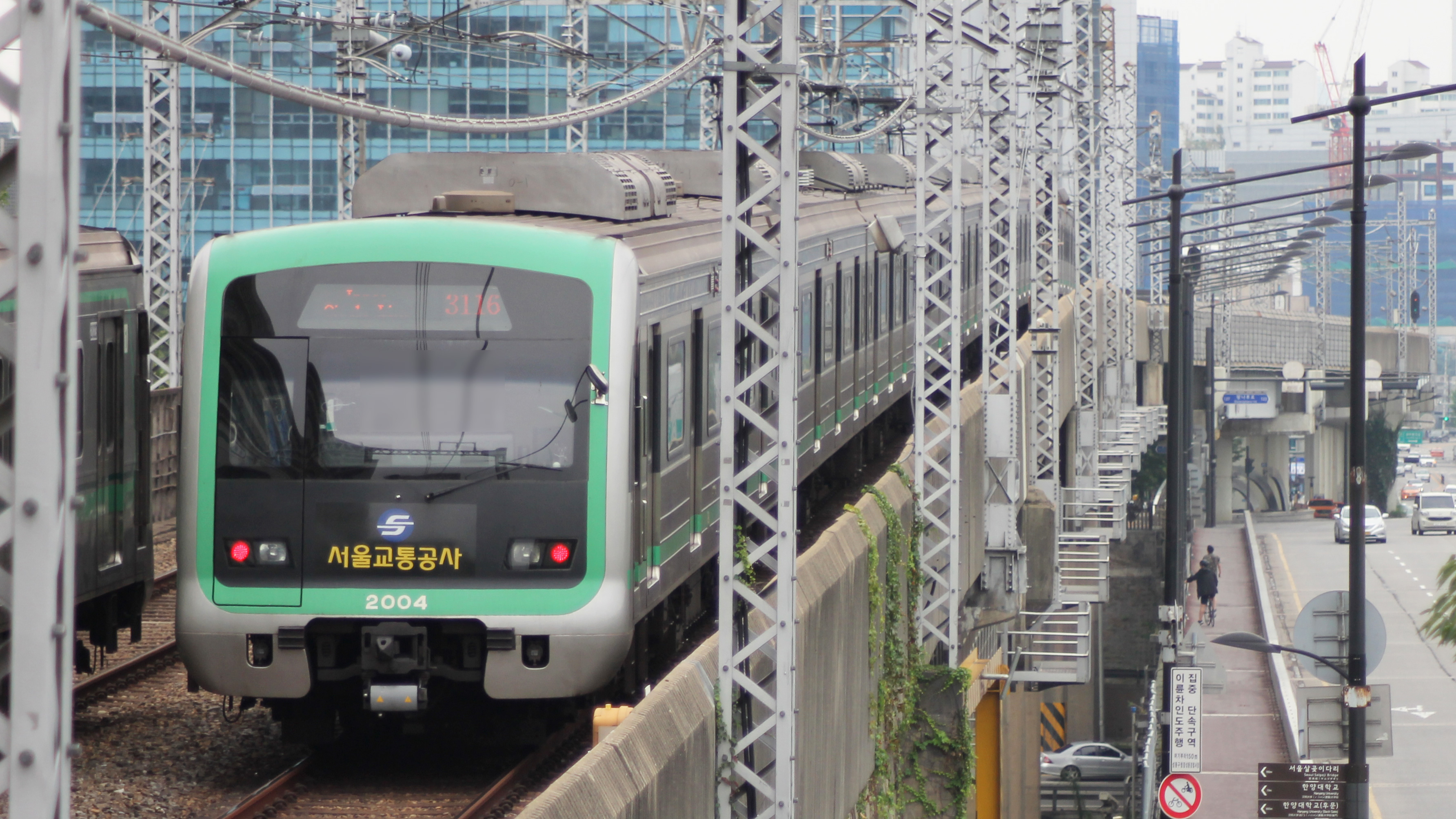
1st batch Set 204 at Seongsu station

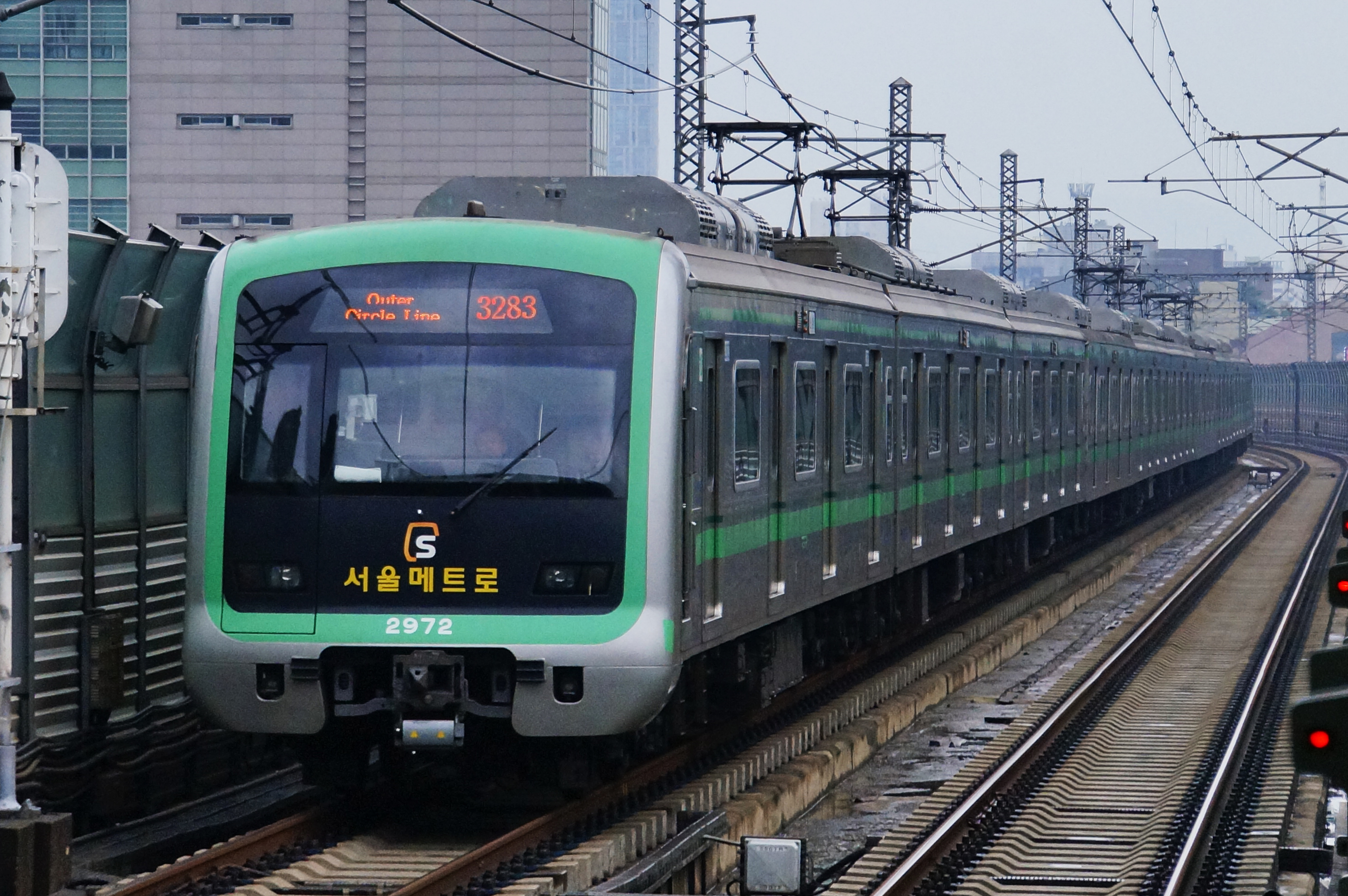
2nd batch Set 272 arriving Konkuk University station

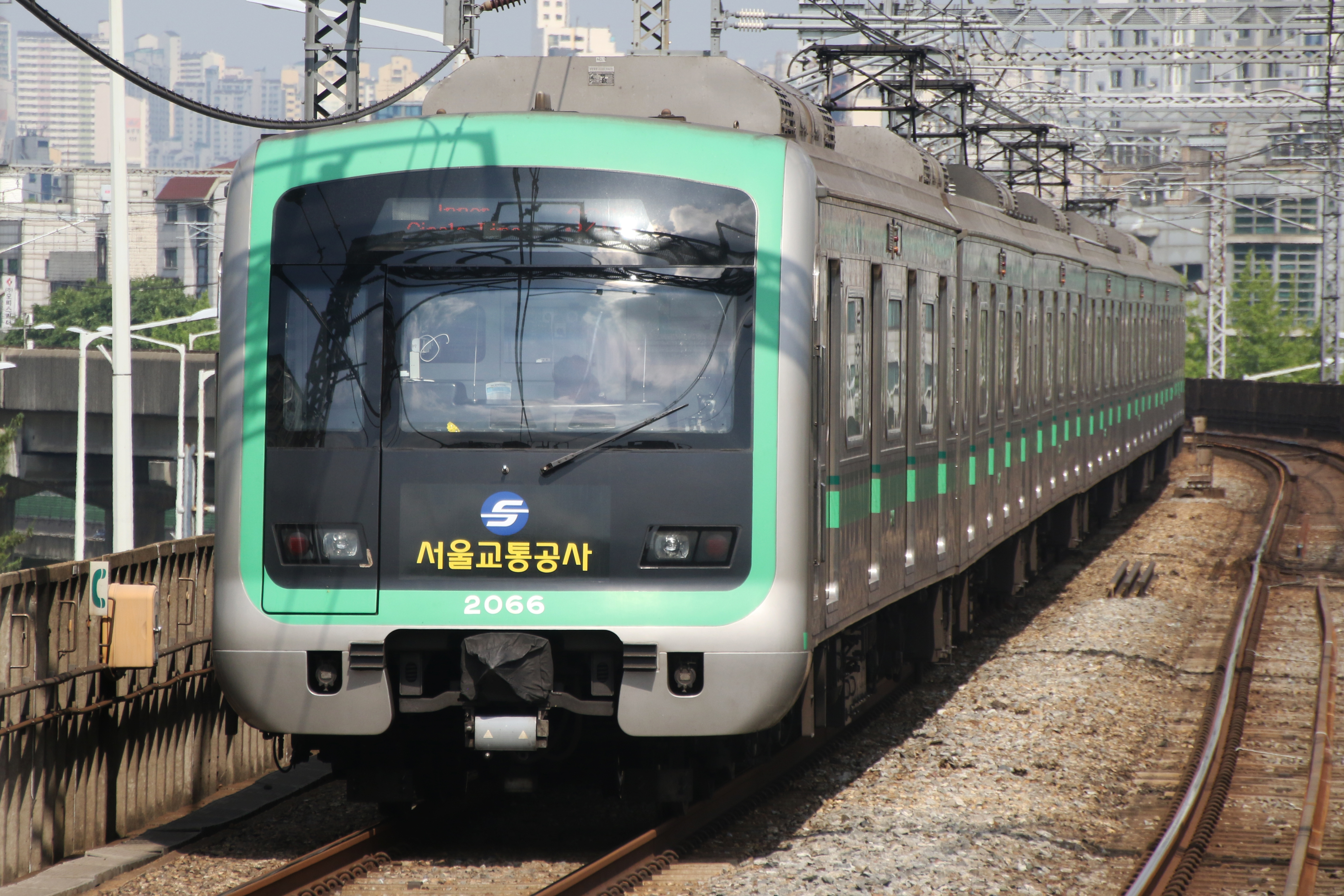
2nd batch Set 266 arriving Guro Digital Complex station

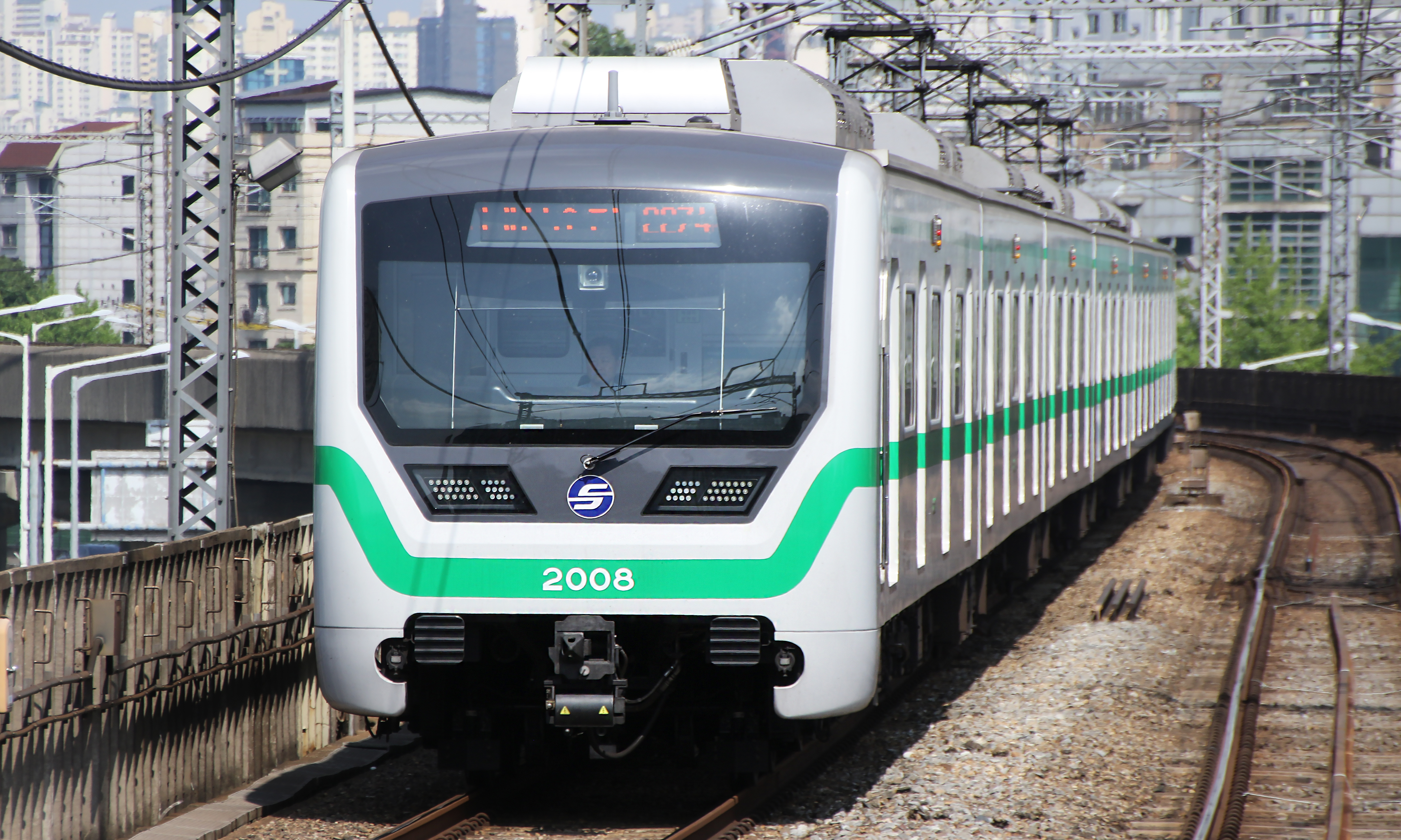
3rd batch Set 208 arriving Guro Digital Complex station

== See also ==
- Rail transport in South Korea
