= Oryun-dong =

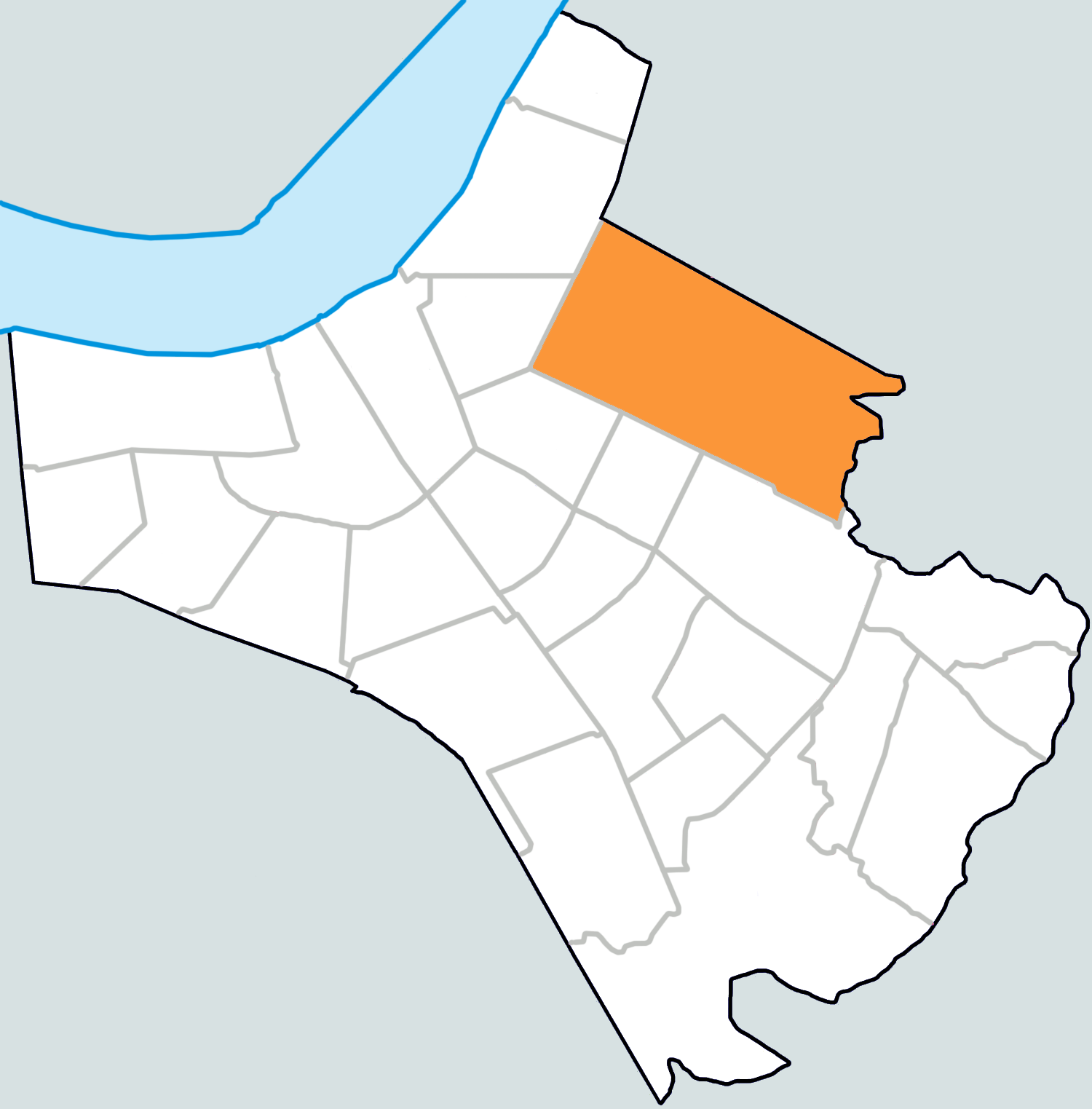
- Country: South Korea

Area
  - Total: 3.17 km^{2} (1.22 sq mi)

Population (2013)
  - Total: 20,269
  - Density: 6,390/km^{2} (16,600/sq mi)

Korean name
- Hangul: 오륜동
- Hanja: 五輪洞
- RR: Oryun-dong
- MR: Oryun-dong

Oryun-dong (Korean: 오륜동) is a neighbourhood (dong) of Songpa District, Seoul, South Korea.

== Overview ==
Oryun-dong shares its historical roots with Bangi-dong. On September 1, 1985, Ogeum-dong was separated from Bangi-dong in Gangdong District. At that time, both Bangi-dong and Oryun-dong were undergoing significant development with the construction of the Olympic Park and the Olympic Village apartments in preparation for the 1988 Seoul Olympics.

On January 1, 1988, Songpa District was created when it split off from Gangdong District. Subsequently, on June 1, 1989, Oryun-dong was officially established as a separate entity from Bangi-dong within Songpa District. The name "Oryun-dong" was chosen in reference to the Olympic Park and the Olympic Village apartments, which had been built for the Seoul Olympics in 1988.

== Education ==
Schools located in Oryun-dong:

- Seoul Oryun Elementary School
- Seoul Seryun Elementary School
- Boseong Middle School
- Seoul Physical Education Middle School
- Oryun Middle School
- Boseong High School
- Seoul Physical Education High School
- Korea National Sport University

== Transportation ==
- Olympic Park station of
- Mongchontoseong station of

== See also ==
- Administrative divisions of South Korea
- 1988 Summer Olympics
