= Ogeum-dong =

Ogeum-dong may refer to

- Ogeum-dong, Seoul
- Ogeum-dong, Gunpo
