= Hanseong Baekje station =

Rail station in Seoul, South Korea

한성백제; Hanseong Baekje
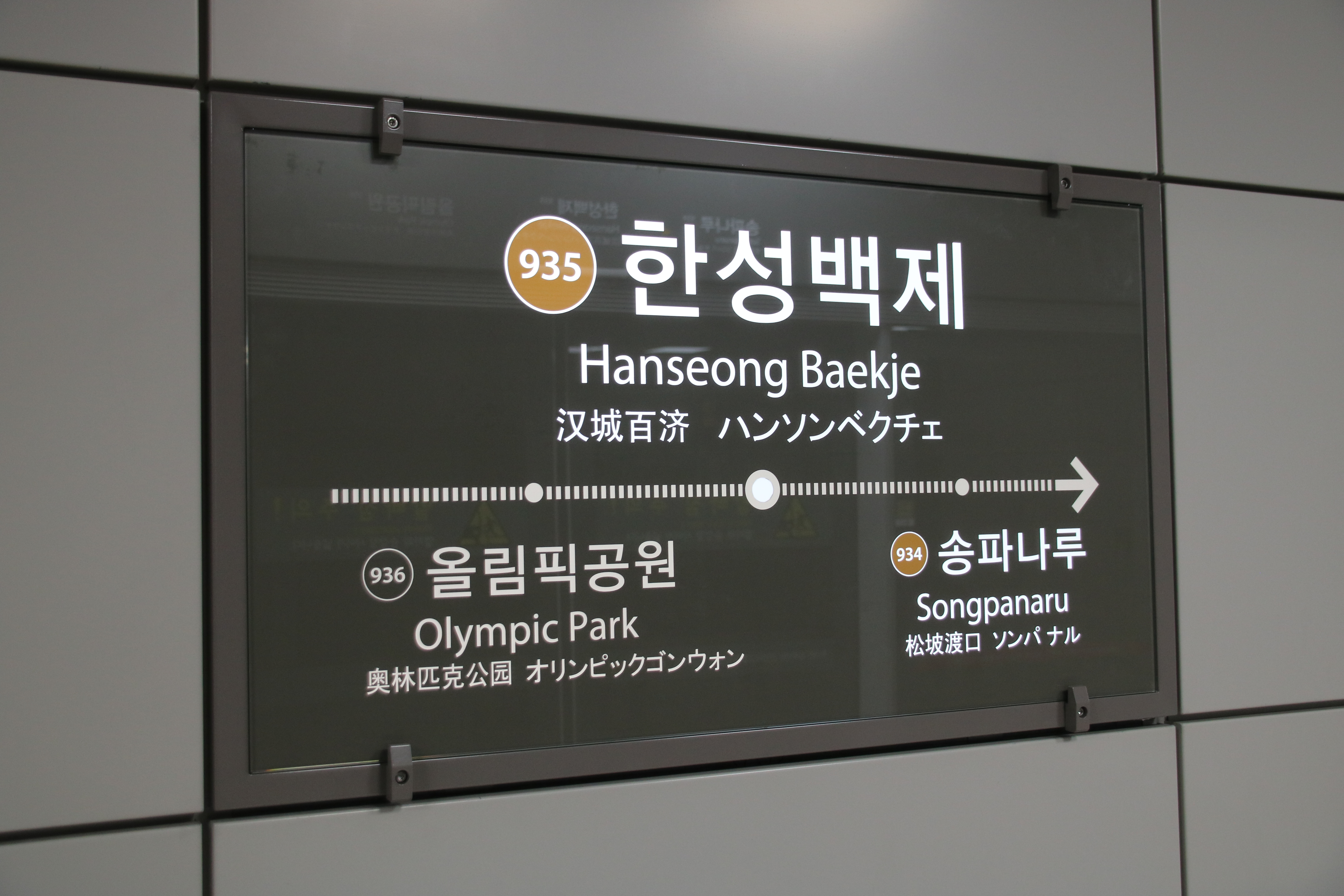
- Station nameplate

Korean name
- Hangul: 한성백제역
- Hanja: 漢城百濟驛
- Revised Romanization: Hanseongbaekjeyeok
- McCune–Reischauer: Hansŏngbaekcheyŏk

General information
- Location: Songpa District, Seoul
- Coordinates: 37°31′0.01″N 127°6′58.36″E
- Operator: Seoul Metro
- Line: Line 9
- Platforms: 1 island platform
- Tracks: 2

Construction
- Structure type: Underground

Key dates
- December 1, 2018: Line 9 opened
Location

Hanseong Baekje is a railway station on Seoul Subway Line 9. It opened on December 1, 2018.

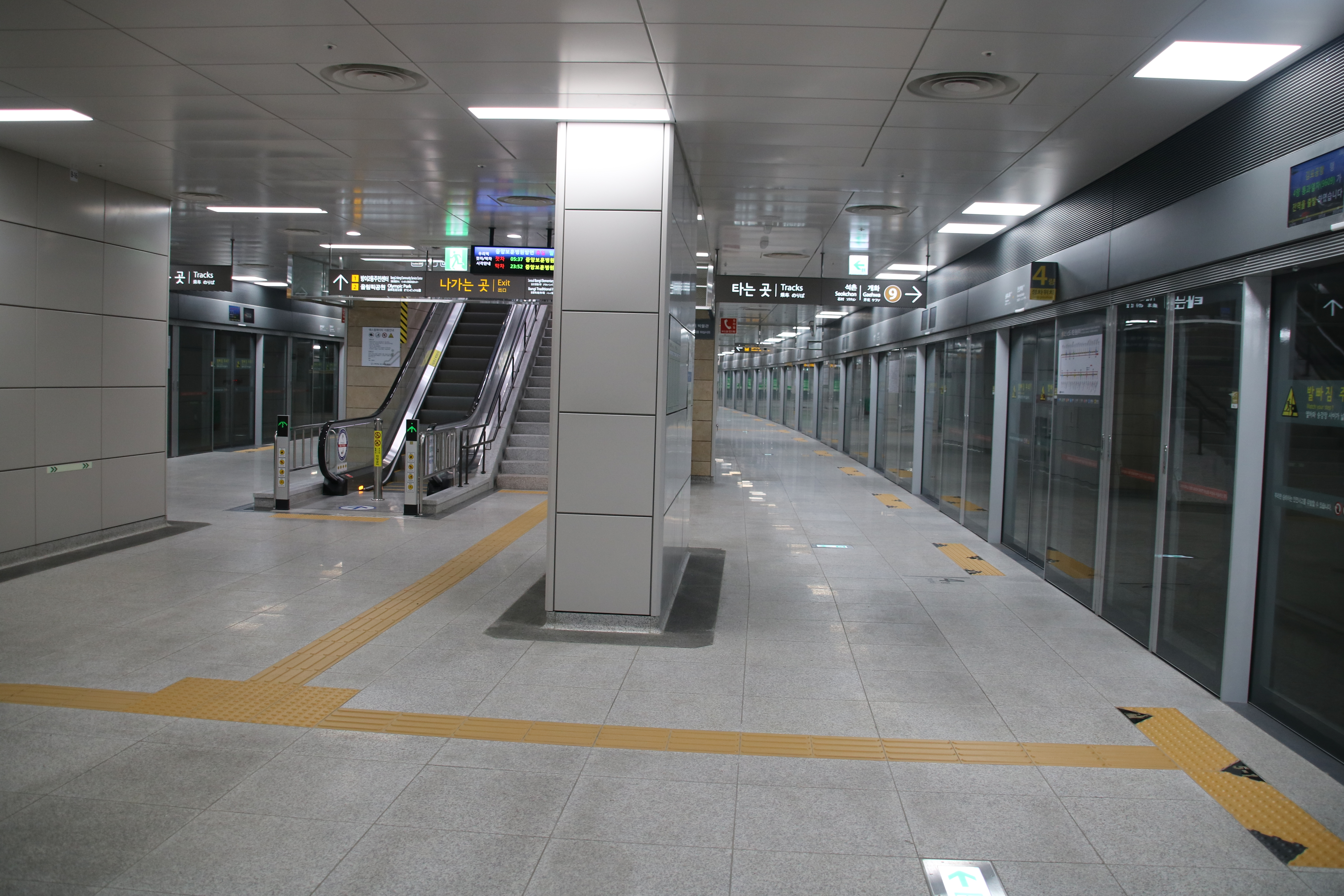
Station platform

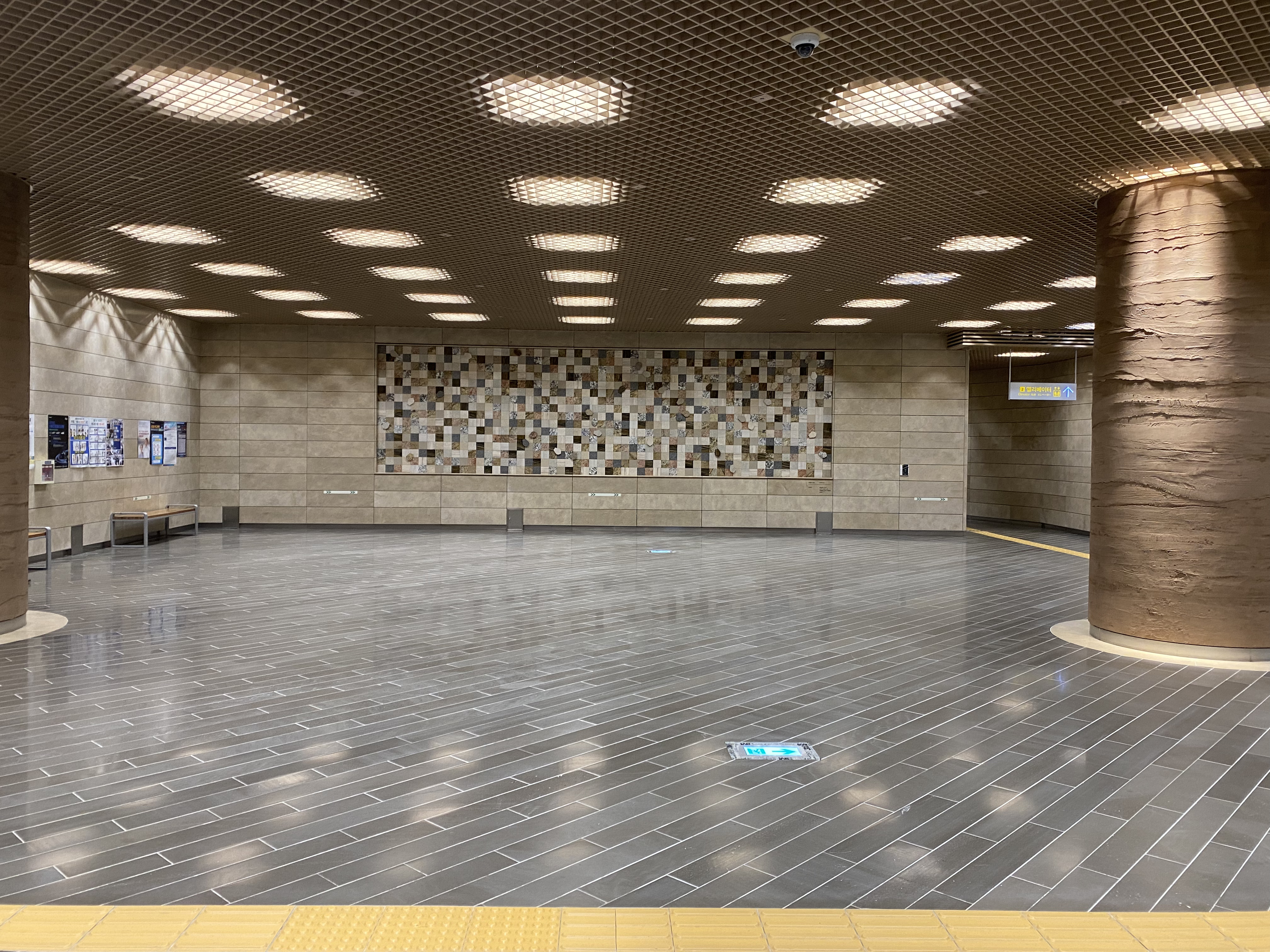
Interior of Hanseong Baekje station, near exit 2.

Preceding station	Seoul Metropolitan Subway	Following station
Songpanaru towards Gaehwa	Line 9	Olympic Park towards VHS Medical Center
