= Gaerong station =

Train station in South Korea

Coordinates: 37°29′53″N 127°08′06″E

개롱; Gaerong
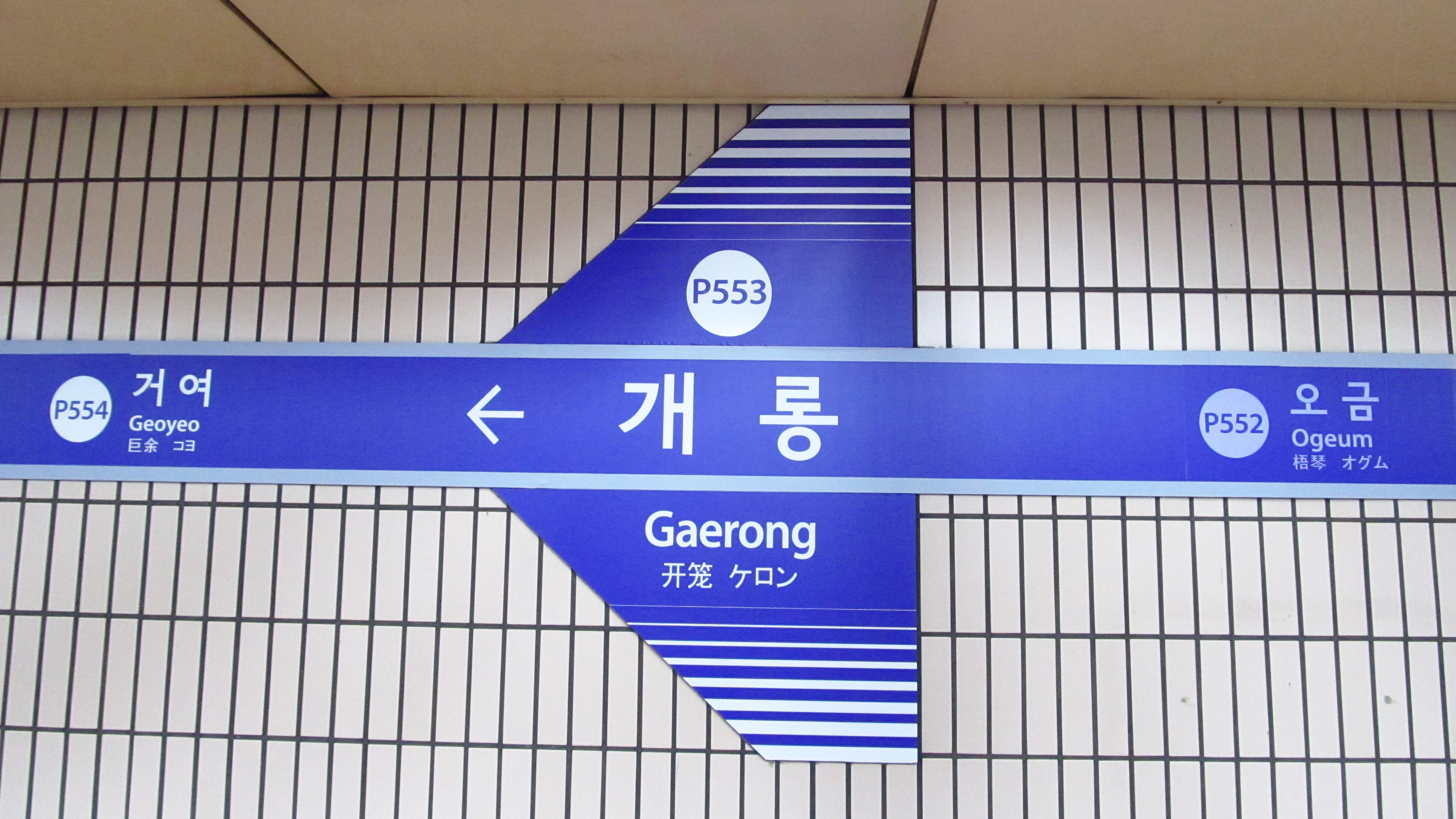
- Station sign

Korean name
- Hangul: 개롱역
- Hanja: 開籠驛
- Revised Romanization: Gaerong-yeok
- McCune–Reischauer: Kaerong-yŏk

General information
- Location: 165-1 Ogeum-dong, Songpa-gu, Seoul
- Operated by: Seoul Metro
- Line(s): Line 5
- Platforms: 2
- Tracks: 2

Construction
- Structure type: Underground

History
- Opened: March 30, 1996

Services
Preceding station	Seoul Metropolitan Subway	Following station
Ogeum towards Banghwa	Line 5 Macheon Branch	Geoyeo towards Macheon

Gaerong Station is a subway station on Seoul Subway Line 5 in Songpa District, Seoul.

== Station layout ==
G	Street level	Exit

L1; Concourse	Lobby	Customer Service, Shops, Vending machines, ATMs

L2; Platforms	Side platform, doors will open on the right
L2; Platforms	Westbound	← Line 5 toward Banghwa (Ogeum)
L2; Platforms	Eastbound	Line 5 toward Macheon (Geoyeo)→
L2; Platforms	Side platform, doors will open on the right
