= Geoyeo station =

Metro station in South Korea

Coordinates: 37°29′36″N 127°08′37″E

거여; Geoyeo
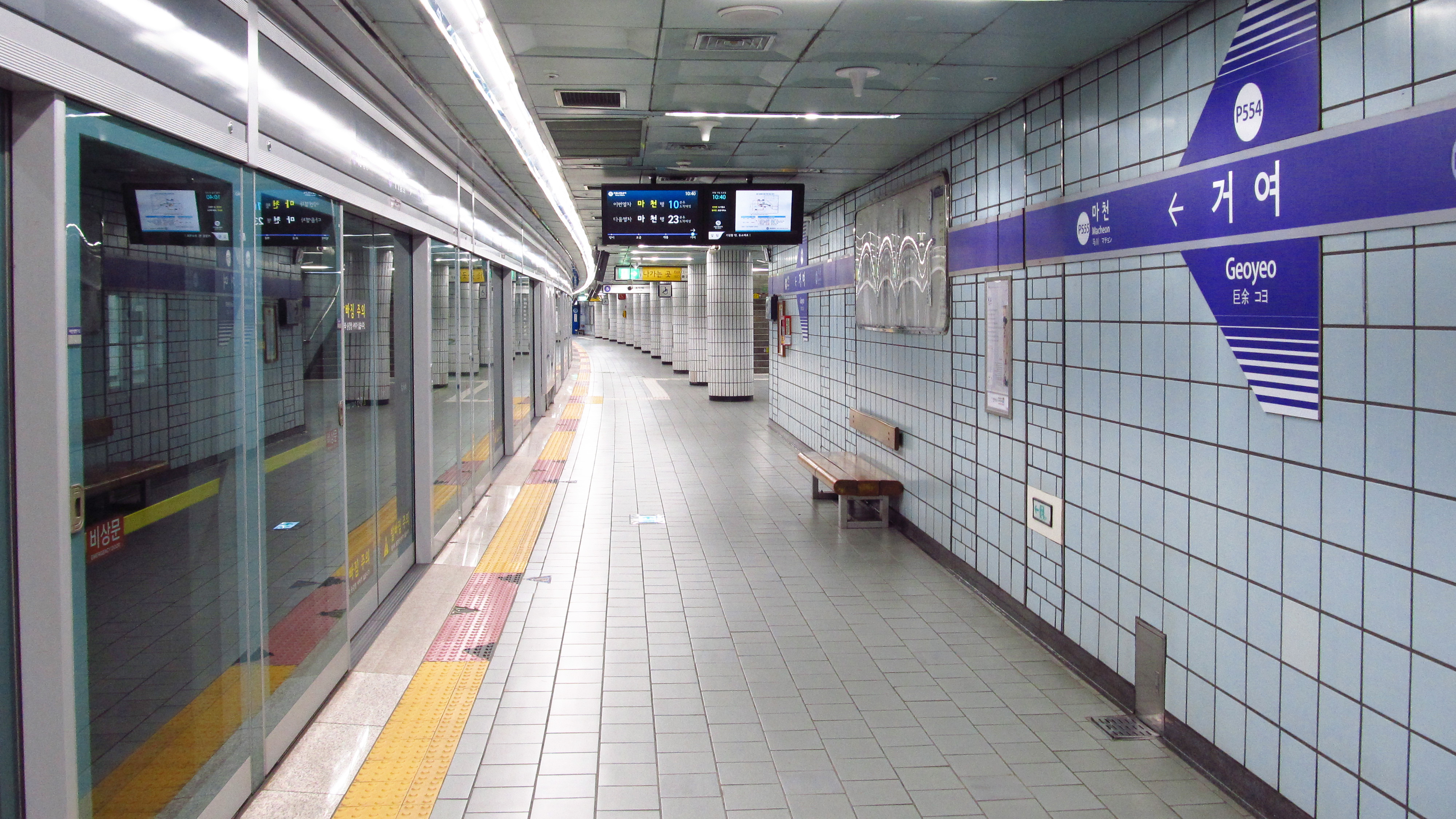
- Station platform

Korean name
- Hangul: 거여역
- Hanja: 巨餘驛
- Revised Romanization: Geoyeo-yeok
- McCune–Reischauer: Kŏyŏ-yŏk

General information
- Location: 20-14 Geoyeo 1-dong, Songpa-gu, Seoul
- Operator: Seoul Metro
- Line: Line 5
- Platforms: 2
- Tracks: 2

Construction
- Structure type: Underground

History
- Opened: March 30, 1996

Services
Preceding station	Seoul Metropolitan Subway	Following station
Gaerong towards Banghwa	Line 5 Macheon Branch	Macheon Terminus
Location

Geoyeo Station is a subway station on Seoul Subway Line 5 in Songpa District, Seoul.

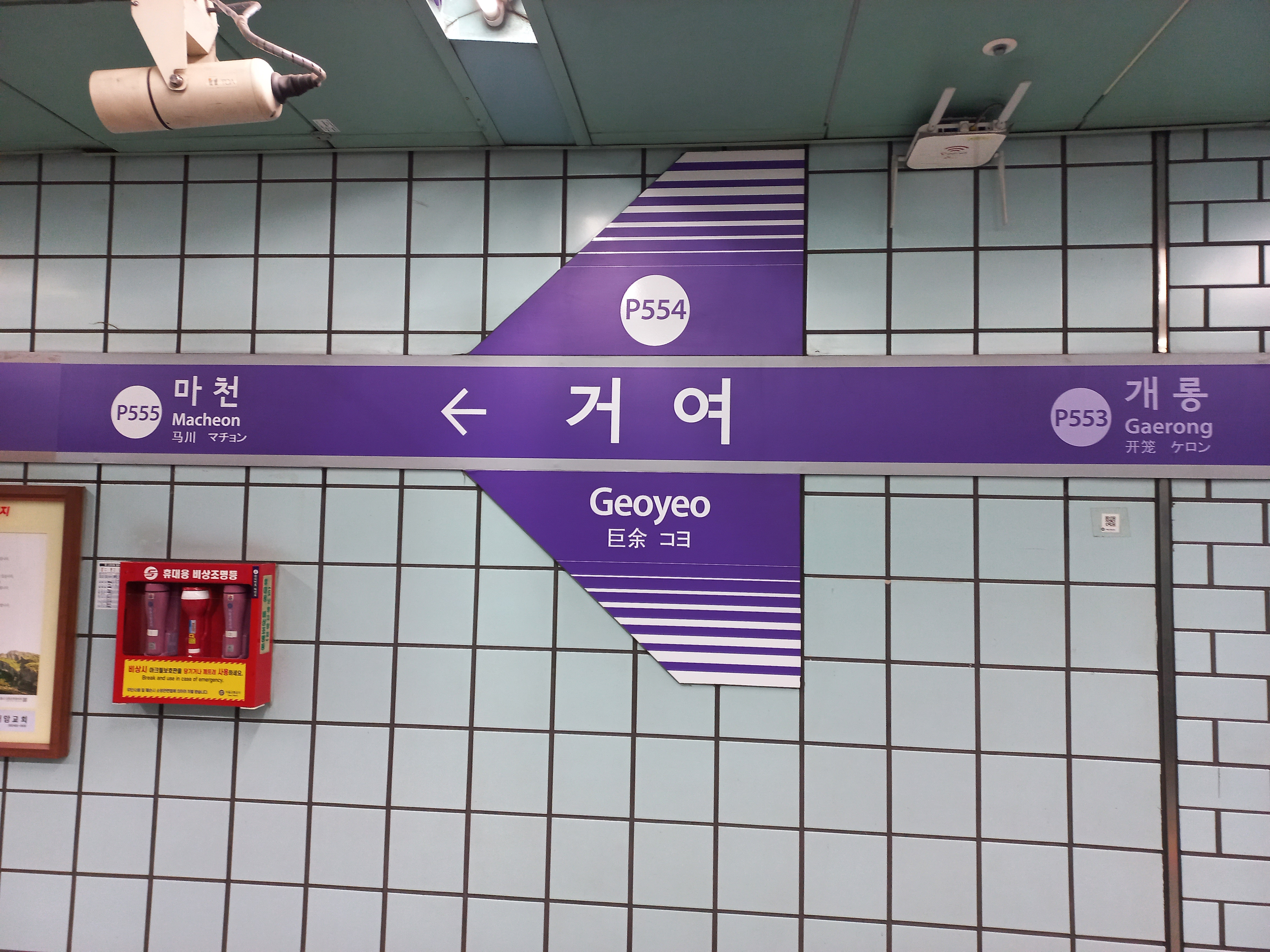
Station name sign

== Station layout ==
G	Street level	Exit

L1; Concourse	Lobby	Customer Service, Shops, Vending machines, ATMs

L2; Platforms	Side platform, doors will open on the right
L2; Platforms	Westbound	← Line 5 toward Banghwa (Gaerong)
L2; Platforms	Eastbound	Line 5 toward Macheon (Terminus)→
L2; Platforms	Side platform, doors will open on the right
