= Macheon-dong =

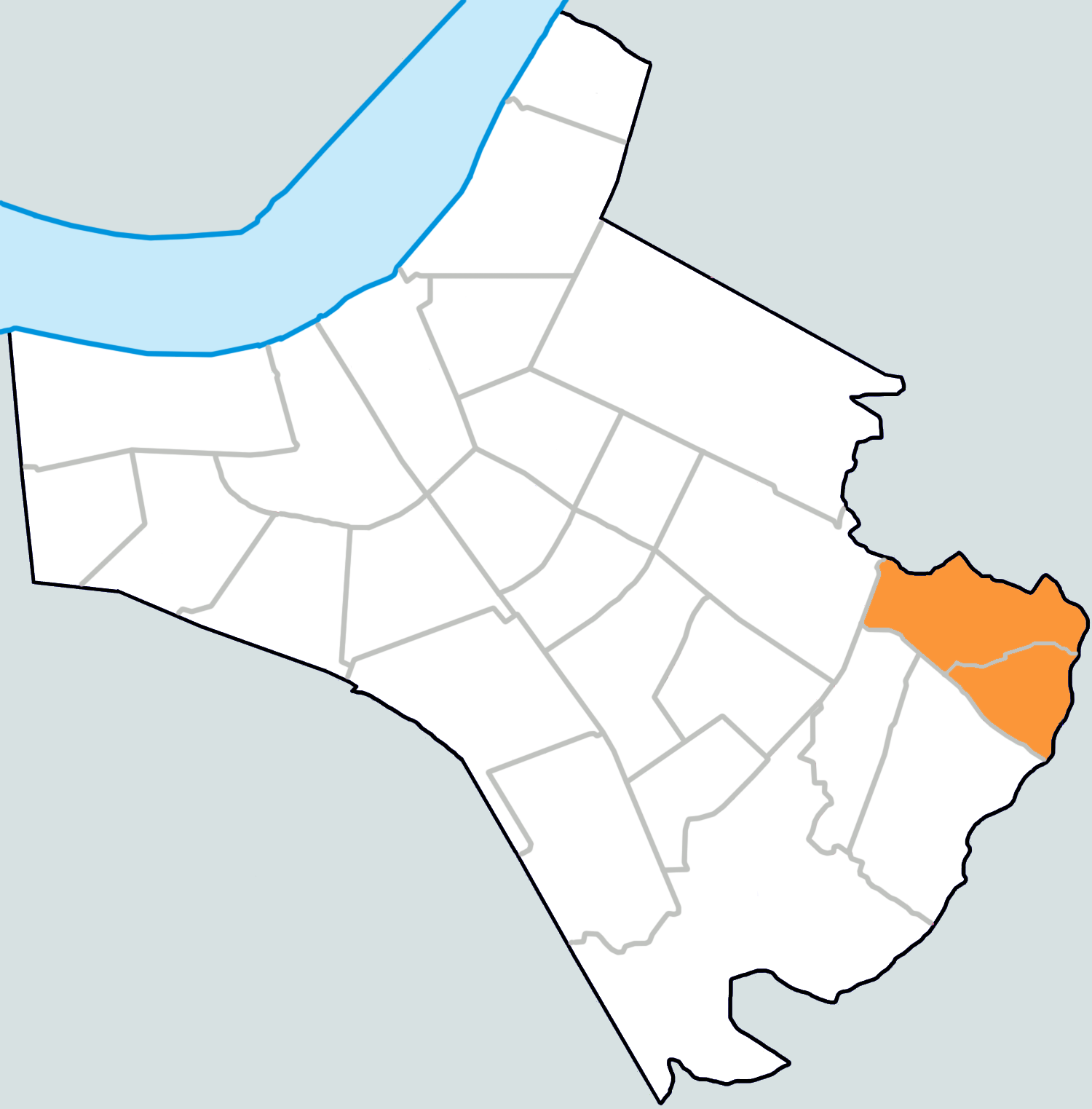
- Country: South Korea

Area
  - Total: 1.47 km^{2} (0.57 sq mi)

Population (2013)
  - Total: 45,873
  - Density: 31,200/km^{2} (80,800/sq mi)

Korean name
- Hangul: 마천동
- Hanja: 馬川洞
- RR: Macheon-dong
- MR: Mach'ŏn-dong

Macheon-dong (Korean: 마천동) is in the dong neighbourhood of Songpa District, Seoul, South Korea.

== Overview ==
Macheon-dong is believed to have derived its name from "Masan" (馬山), which is associated with the legend of General Im Gyeong-eop riding a dragon horse (Yongma) during the Manchu invasions. The area was historically part of Jungdae-myeon, Gwangju-gun, Gyeonggi Province, following the Joseon Dynasty.

In 1914, during the Japanese colonial period, Gyeonggi Province underwent a reorganization of administrative boundaries, and the local villages, including "Dolmudeogi" and "Gaunmaetmal," were merged and renamed Macheon-ri.

On January 1, 1963, with the expansion of Seoul's administrative boundaries, Macheon-dong was incorporated into Seongdong-gu. Later, on October 1, 1975, it became part of the newly established Gangnam-gu, and on October 1, 1979, it was transferred to Gangdong-gu. Finally, on January 1, 1988, when Songpa-gu was separated from Gangdong-gu, Macheon-dong became part of Songpa-gu, where it remains today.

== Education ==
Schools located in Macheon-dong:

- Seoul Macheon Elementary School
- Seoul Namcheon Elementary School

== Transportation ==
- Macheon Station of

== See also ==
- Im Gyeong Eop
- Namhansan
- Administrative divisions of South Korea
