= Bangi station =

Station of the Seoul Metropolitan Subway

Coordinates: 37°30′31″N 127°07′33″E

방이; Bangi
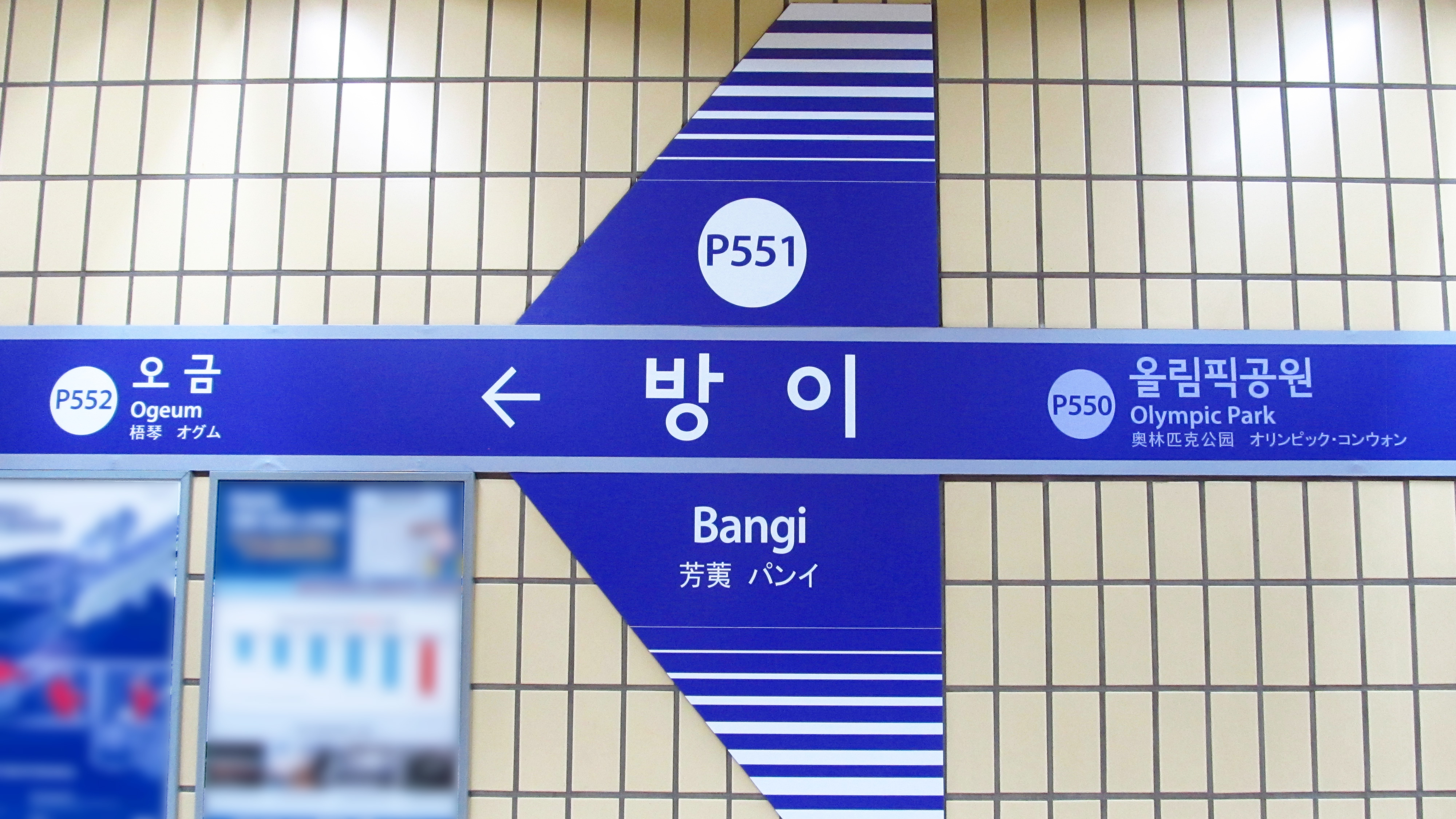
- Station sign

Korean name
- Hangul: 방이역
- Hanja: 芳荑驛
- Revised Romanization: Bang-i-yeok
- McCune–Reischauer: Pangi-yŏk

General information
- Location: 1127 Yangjaedaero Jiha, 217-2 Bangi-dong, Songpa-gu, Seoul
- Operated by: Seoul Metro
- Line(s): Line 5
- Platforms: 2
- Tracks: 2

Construction
- Structure type: Underground

History
- Opened: March 30, 1996

Services
Preceding station	Seoul Metropolitan Subway	Following station
Olympic Park towards Banghwa	Line 5 Macheon Branch	Ogeum towards Macheon

Bangi Station is a subway station on Seoul Subway Line 5 in Songpa District, Seoul.

== Station layout ==
G	Street level	Exit

L1; Concourse	Lobby	Customer Service, Shops, Vending machines, ATMs

L2; Platforms	Side platform, doors will open on the right
L2; Platforms	Westbound	← Line 5 toward Banghwa (Olympic Park)
L2; Platforms	Eastbound	Line 5 toward Macheon (Ogeum)→
L2; Platforms	Side platform, doors will open on the right
