= Samjeon-dong =

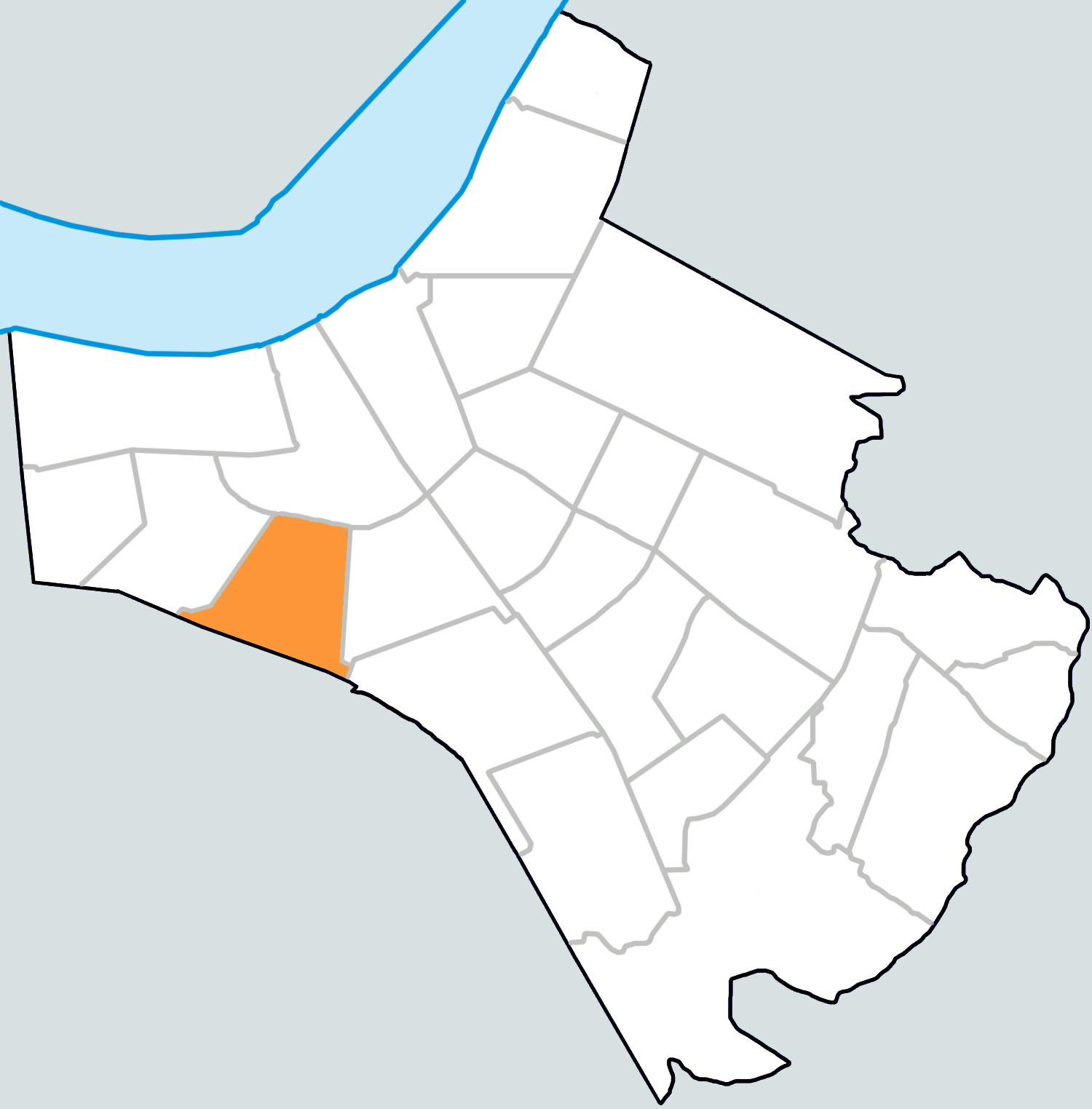
- Country: South Korea

Area
  - Total: 0.95 km^{2} (0.37 sq mi)

Population (2001)
  - Total: 34,791
  - Density: 34,554/km^{2} (89,490/sq mi)

Korean name
- Hangul: 삼전동
- Hanja: 三田洞
- RR: Samjeon-dong
- MR: Samjŏn-dong

Samjeon-dong (Korean: 삼전동) is a neighbourhood, dong of Songpa District, Seoul, South Korea. The name originated from the fact that it once had only three fields.

== Overview ==
The name of Samjeon-dong is said to be derived from the presence of three fields (삼전, or "three fields") in the area. Historically, this location was a port, one of the five ports (진, Jin) near Seoul. While tidal waters reached other parts, these three fields remained unaffected by the tides and thus became cultivated lands. During the Joseon Dynasty, the area was known by several names, including "Sambatgae" or "Samjeondo" (三田渡). It was also called "Majunpo" (麻田浦), referring to the practice of planting hemp (ma) in the fields, and sometimes referred to as "Jangseunggol" or "Jangseungbeol" due to the presence of ancient Jangseung (totem poles) in the area.

Samjeondo was officially established during the 21st year of King Sejong's reign (1439). Along with Hangang Naru and Nodeul Naru, it became one of the three major ports of the Gyeonggang region (京江三津). The port was managed by ten officers known as Jinbu (津夫). As the role of Samjeondo grew, it expanded its jurisdiction to also oversee the nearby port of Gwangjin.

== Education ==
Schools located in Samjeon-dong:

- Seoul Samjeon Elementary School
- Baemyeong Middle School
- Baemyeong High School

== See also ==
- Administrative divisions of South Korea
