= Ogeum-dong, Seoul =

Ogeum-dong
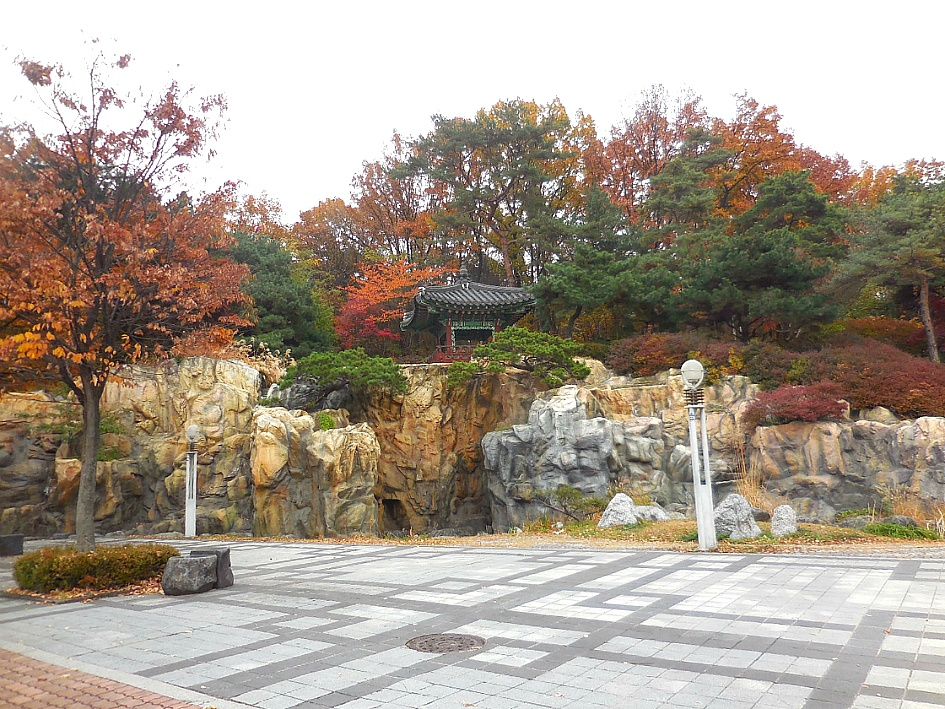
- Ogeum Park

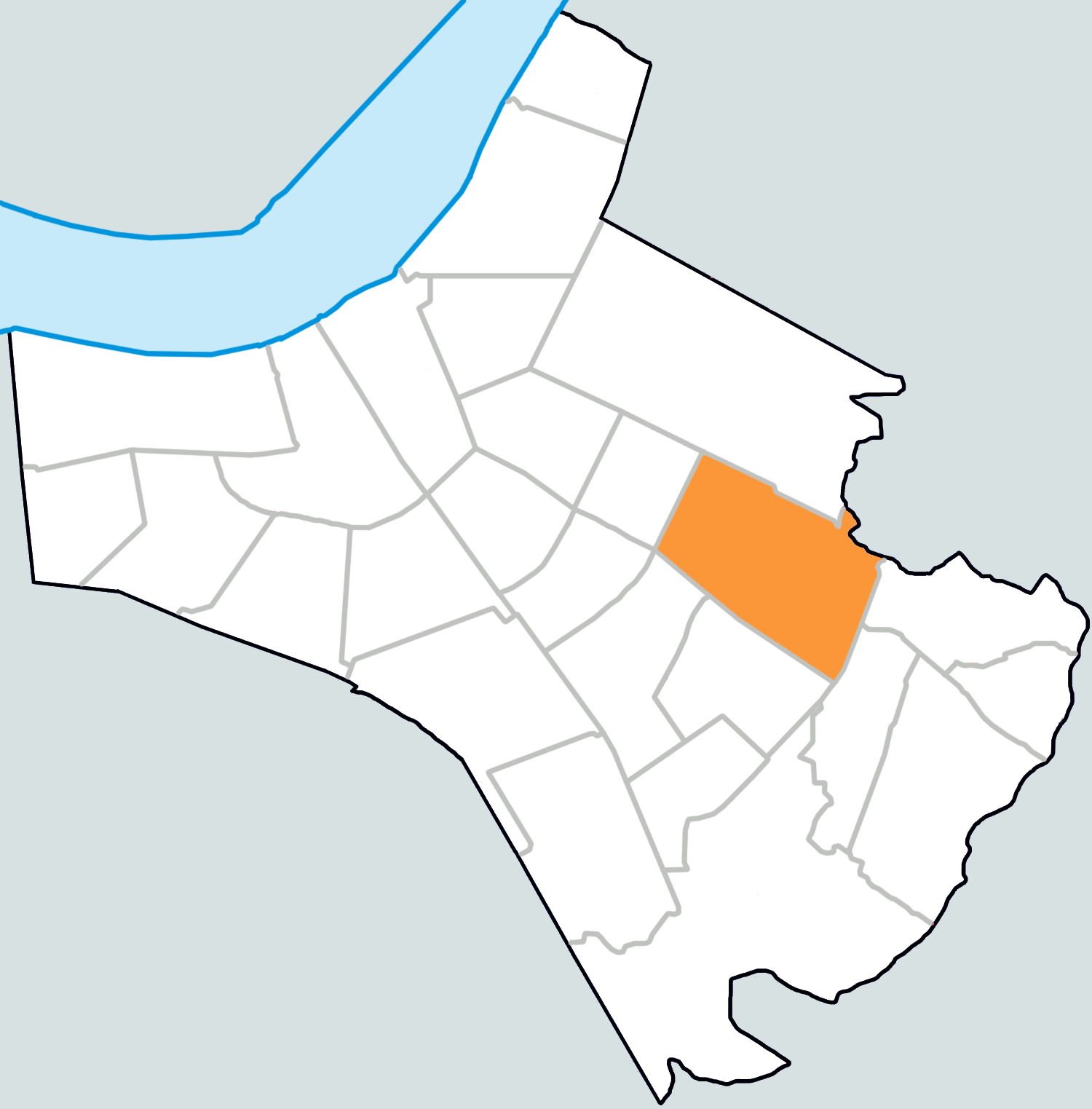
- Coordinates: 37.504°N 127.135°E
- Country: South Korea

Area
  - Total: 1.65 km^{2} (0.64 sq mi)

Population (2013)
  - Total: 38,333
  - Density: 23,200/km^{2} (60,200/sq mi)

Korean name
- Hangul: 오금동
- Hanja: 梧琴洞
- RR: Ogeum-dong
- MR: Ogŭm-dong

Ogeum-dong (Korean: 오금동) is a neighbourhood (dong) of Songpa District, Seoul, South Korea.

== Overview ==
Ogeum-dong, located in the Songpa District of Seoul, South Korea, derives its name from two different origins. One theory suggests that the area was named after the abundance of odong (paulownia) trees, which were commonly used by artisans who crafted the geomungo (a traditional Korean string instrument). Another theory links the name to an event during the Byeongja Horan in the 17th century, when King Injo of Joseon fled to the Namhansanseong fortress. At Baekto Pass, the king stopped to rest and reportedly told his officials that his "knees were sore" (a reference to his "ogeum," or the inner part of his knees), and from that point on, the area became known as Ogeumgol.

Until the late Joseon Dynasty, the area was referred to as Ogeum-ri in Jungdae-myeon, Gwangju County, Gyeonggi Province. During the Japanese colonial period, in 1914, the administrative boundaries and names in Gyeonggi Province were restructured. As part of this reorganization, natural villages such as Ogeumgol, Utmal, Angol, and Gaerong-ri were merged to form the new district of Ogeum-ri.

After Korea's liberation, in 1963, a significant territorial expansion took place in Seoul, and Ogeum-ri was incorporated into the city's Seongdong District.

== Education ==
Schools located in Ogeum-dong:

- Seoul Gaerong Elementary School
- Seoul Geoyeo Elementary School
- Seoul Ogeum Elementary School
- Boin Middle School
- Ogeum Middle School
- Oju Middle School
- Seryun Middle School
- Boin High School
- Ogeum High School

== Transportation ==
- Ogeum station of and of
- Bangi station of
- Gaerong station of

== See also ==
- Gayageum
- Im Gyeong-eop
- Qing invasion of Joseon
- Administrative divisions of South Korea
