= Pungnap-dong =

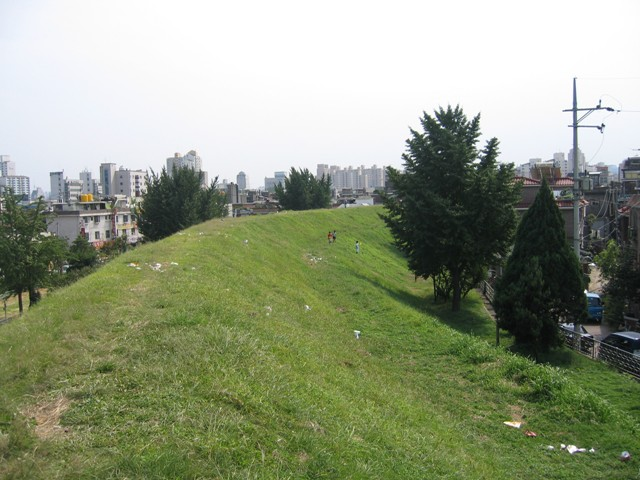
- Pungnap Toseong located in Pungnap-dong

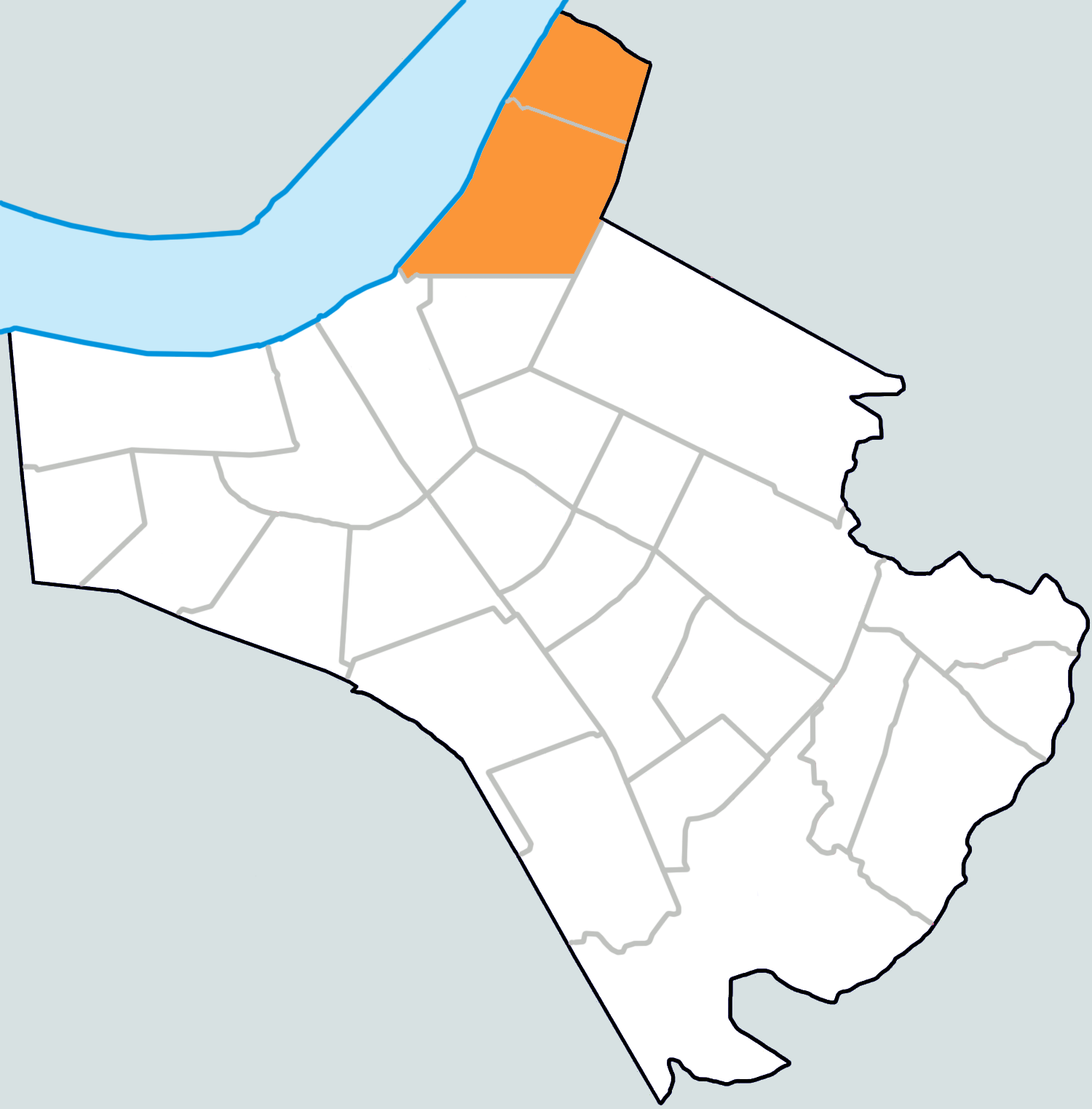
- Country: South Korea

Area
  - Total: 2.36 km^{2} (0.91 sq mi)

Population (2013)
  - Total: 47,032
  - Density: 19,900/km^{2} (51,600/sq mi)

Korean name
- Hangul: 풍납동
- Hanja: 風納洞
- RR: Pungnap-dong
- MR: P'ungnap-tong

Pungnap-dong (Korean: 풍납동) is a neighbourhood (dong) of Songpa District, Seoul, South Korea.

== Etymology ==
The name "Oryun-dong" is believed to be derived from the presence of the Baramdeuri Fortress (also known as the Pungnap-ri Fortress) in the area. The name "Baramdeuri" or its Chinese character equivalent "Pungnap-ri (風納里)" is said to have originated from this fortress. Some theories suggest that the fortress was also known as "Saseong (蛇城)," where "Saseong" means "Snake Fortress." The word "Saseong" is said to be a phonetic variation of "Baeam," which resembles the word "Baram" (meaning wind), and "Deuri" in this context may refer to "Deul," meaning plain, rather than "Nap" (meaning to collect). In ancient times, "Deul" referred to a settlement or a fortified town, and the pronunciation of the word could vary between "Deul," "Deura," "Dre," "Dara," "Dallae," or "Deure."

Therefore, "Baramdeuri" is thought to be a mispronunciation of "Baeamdeuri" or "Baeamdeuri," which referred to the "Snake Fortress." It is believed that while the fortress was written as "Saseong" in Chinese characters during the Baekje period, the name "Baramdeuri" came about due to the variation in local pronunciation, which later evolved into "Pungnap," a name still used today.

== Education ==
Schools located in Pungnap-dong:

- Seoul Poongsung Elementary School
- Seoul Pungnap Elementary School
- Seoul Tosung Elementary School
- Pung Sung Middle School
- Pungnap Middle School
- Youngpa Girls' Middle School
- Youngpa Girls' High School

== Transportation ==
- Cheonho station of and of
- Gangdong-gu Office station of

== See also ==
- Pungnap Toseong
- Administrative divisions of South Korea
