= Munjeong-dong =

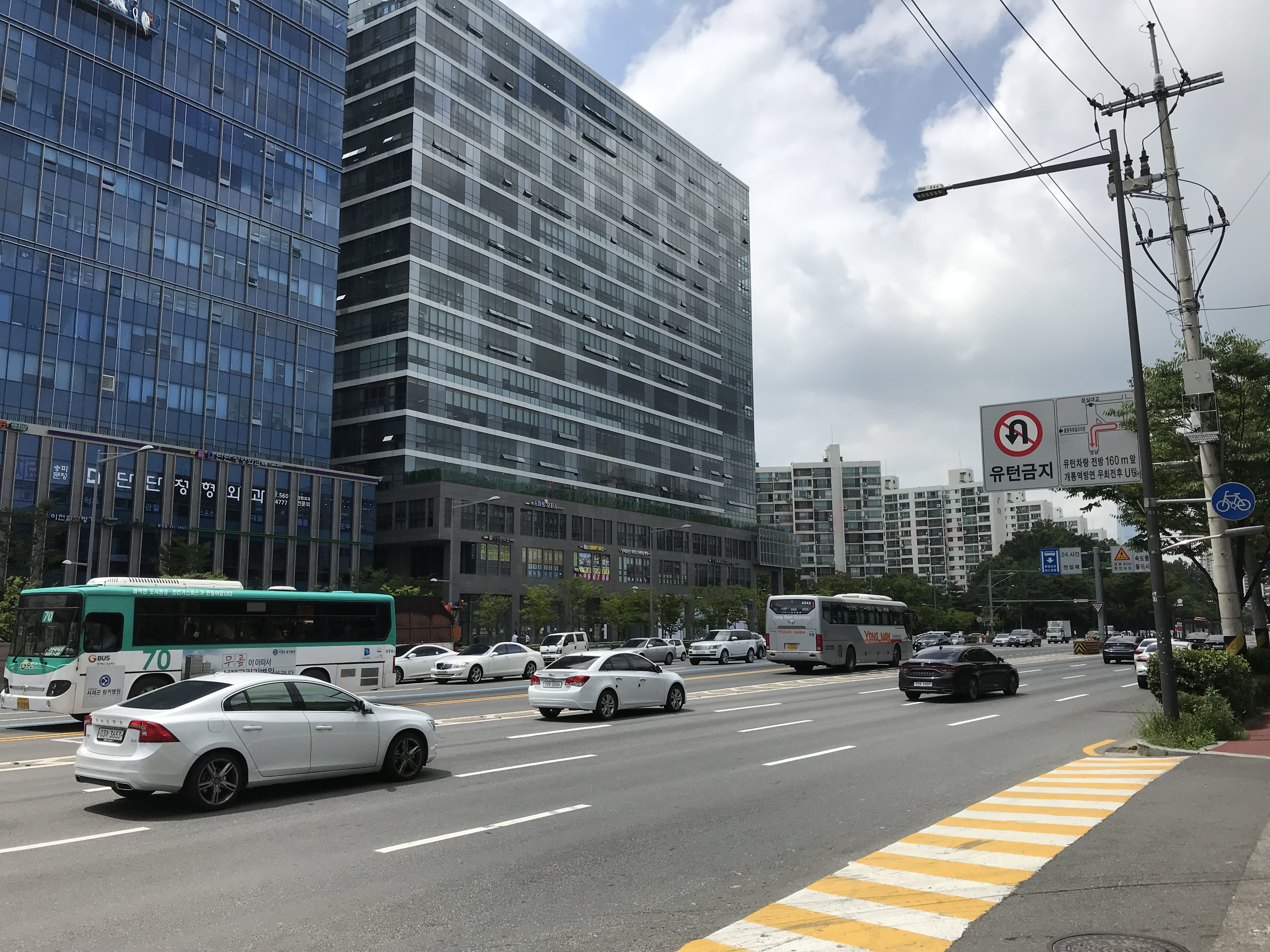

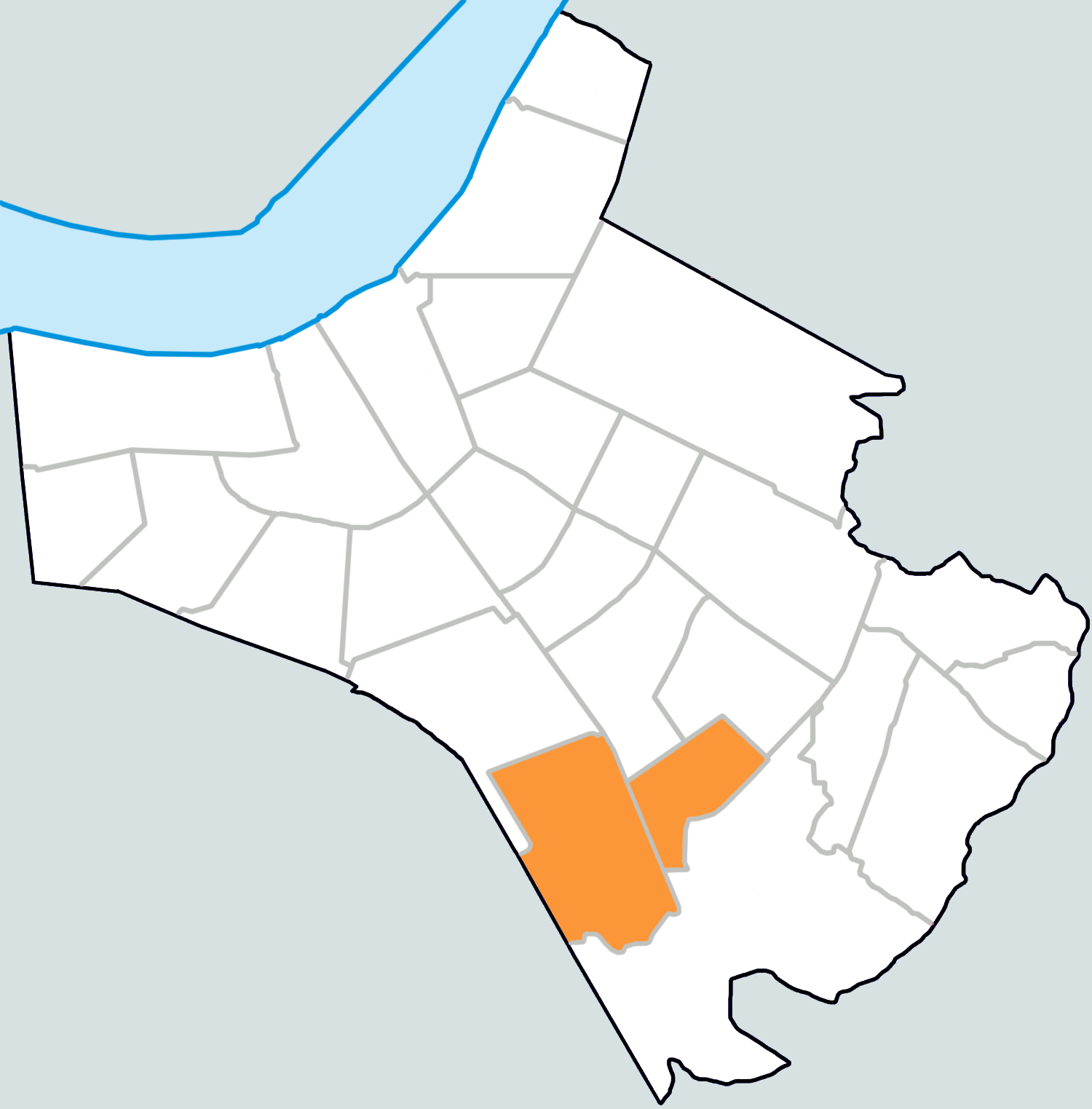

- Location within Seoul
- Coordinates: 37°29′07″N 127°07′16″E
- Country: South Korea

Area
  - Total: 2.76 km^{2} (1.07 sq mi)

Population (2013)
  - Total: 39,813
  - Density: 14,400/km^{2} (37,400/sq mi)

Korean name
- Hangul: 문정동
- Hanja: 文井洞
- RR: Munjeong-dong
- MR: Munjŏng-dong

Munjeong-dong (Korean: 문정동) is a neighbourhood (dong) of Songpa District, Seoul, South Korea.

== Overview ==
Munjeong-dong is a district located in the Songpa-gu area of Seoul, South Korea. The name "Munjeong" is derived from an event during the Byeongja Horan in the 17th century. During this time, King Injo of Joseon sought refuge in Namhansanseong, a mountain fortress, and stopped to rest in Munjeong-dong. He drank water from the area, finding it exceptionally refreshing, and thus named the village "Munjeong" after the surname of the prominent Mun clan that lived in the region.

After the Joseon Dynasty, Munjeong-dong became part of the Jungdae-myeon (administrative district) in Gwangju County, Gyeonggi Province. In 1914, during the Japanese occupation of Korea, the names and boundaries of administrative districts in Gyeonggi Province were reorganized. Munjeonggol and other local villages such as Hegyeongmeori were consolidated and renamed Munjeong-ri.

On January 1, 1963, Munjeong-ri was incorporated into Seoul's Seongdong District, officially becoming Munjeong-dong. In 1975, as Gangnam District was newly established, Munjeong-dong became part of Gangnam District. When Gangdong District was created in 1979, Munjeong-dong was transferred to it. Following the establishment of Songpa District in 1988, Munjeong-dong was integrated into Songpa, where it remains to this day.

On June 10, 2010, mixed-use complex, Garden 5 was established in Munjeong-dong, creating a variety of lifestyle infrastructure; however, due to a series of adverse factors like covid-19, it has not demonstrated the level of impact that had been anticipated.

== Education ==
Schools located in Munjeong-dong:

- Seoul Munjeong Elementary School
- Seoul Gawon Elementary School
- Moondeok Elementary School
- Munjeong Middle School
- Munjeong High School

== Transportation ==
- Munjeong station of

== See also ==
- Administrative divisions of South Korea
