= Olympic Park station (Seoul) =

Train station in South Korea

올림픽공원 (한국체대); Olympic Park (Korea National Sport Univ.)
올림픽공원 (한국체대); Olympic Park (Korea National Sport University)
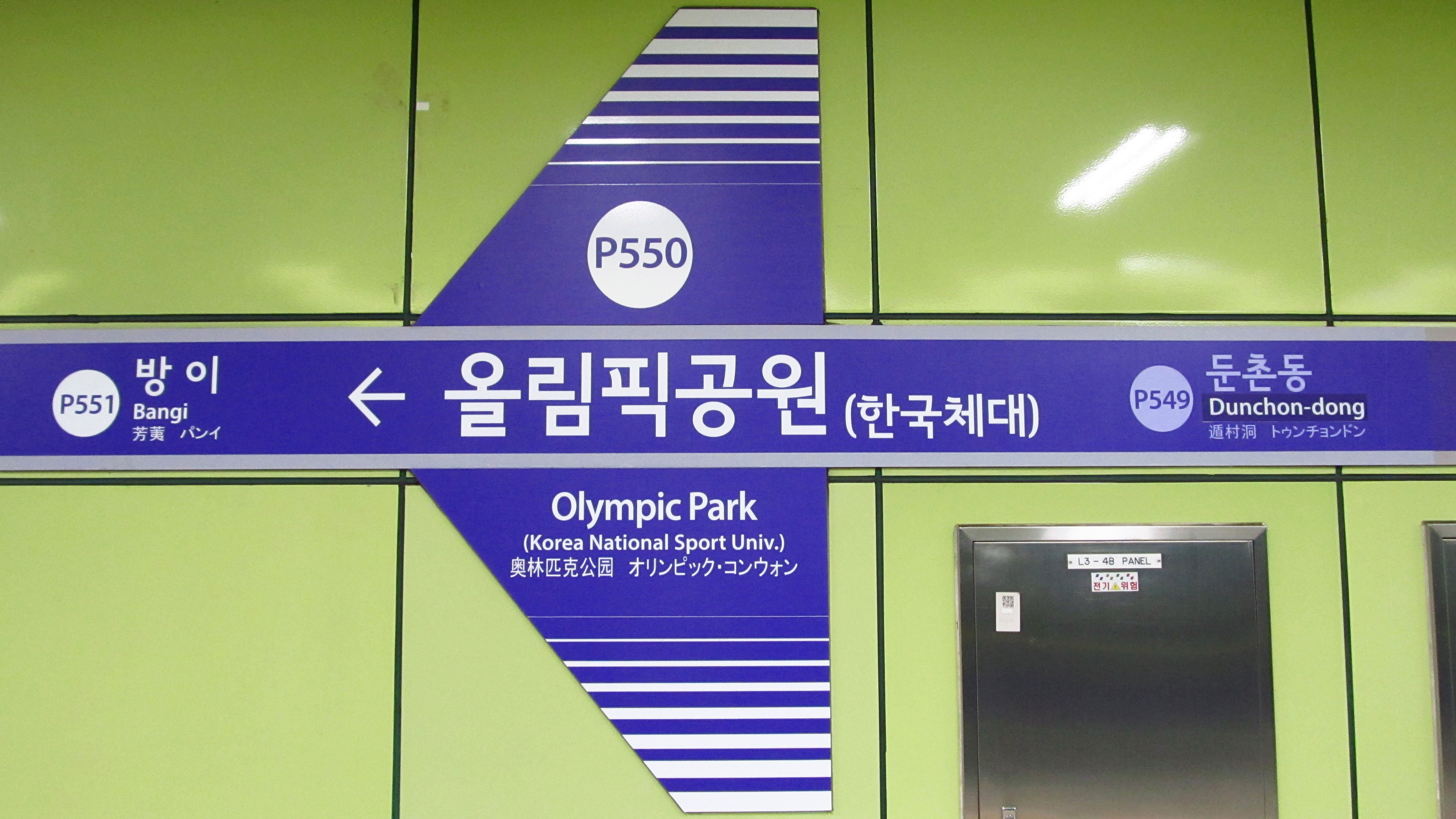
- Station Sign (Line 5)

Korean name
- Hangul: 올림픽공원역
- Hanja: 올림픽公園驛
- Revised Romanization: Ollimpikgongwon-yeok
- McCune–Reischauer: Ollimp'ikkongwŏn-yŏk

General information
- Location: 89 Bangi-dong, Songpa-gu, Seoul
- Coordinates: 37°30′58″N 127°07′51″E
- Operator: Seoul Metro
- Lines: Line 5 Line 9
- Platforms: 3
- Tracks: 4

Construction
- Structure type: Underground

Key dates
- March 30, 1996 December 1, 2018: Line 5 opened Line 9 opened

Services
Preceding station	Seoul Metropolitan Subway	Following station
Dunchon-dong towards Banghwa	Line 5 Macheon Branch	Bangi towards Macheon
Hanseong Baekje towards Gaehwa	Line 9	Dunchon Oryun towards VHS Medical Center
Seokchon towards Gimpo International Airport	Line 9 Express	VHS Medical Center Terminus
Location

Olympic Park is a subway station on Seoul Subway Line 5 and Seoul Subway Line 9 in Songpa District, Seoul. It became an interchange with Subway Line 9 on December 1, 2018.

== Station layout ==
=== Line 5 ===
Dunchon-dong ↑
E/B | | W/B
↓ Bangi

Westbound	← ● Line 5 toward Banghwa
Eastbound	● Line 5 toward Macheon →

=== Line 9 ===
Hanseong Baekje ↑
S/B | | N/B
↓ Dunchon Oryun

Northbound	← ● Line 9 toward Gaehwa
Southbound	● Line 9 toward VHS Medical Center →

== Gallery ==
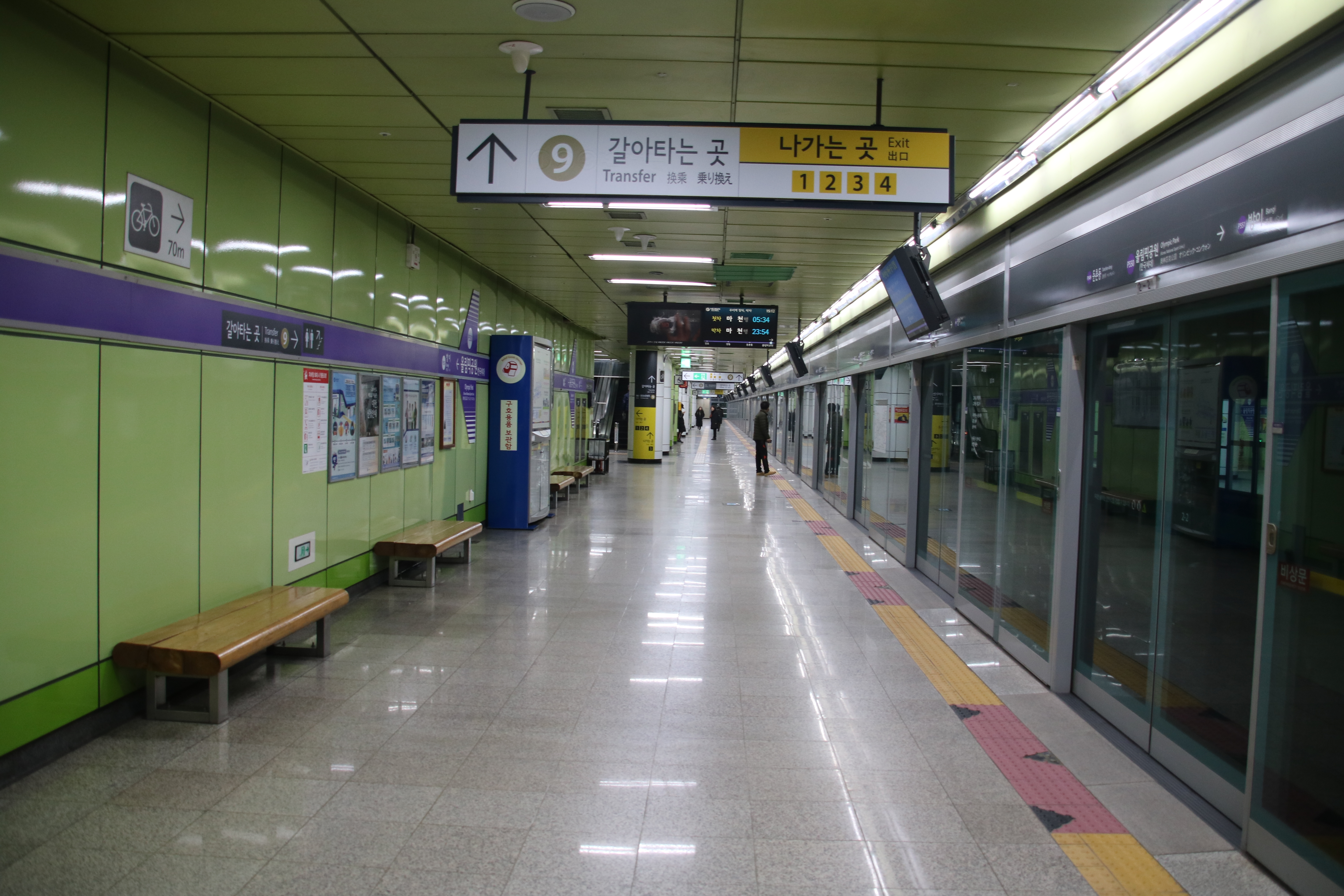
Line 5 platform

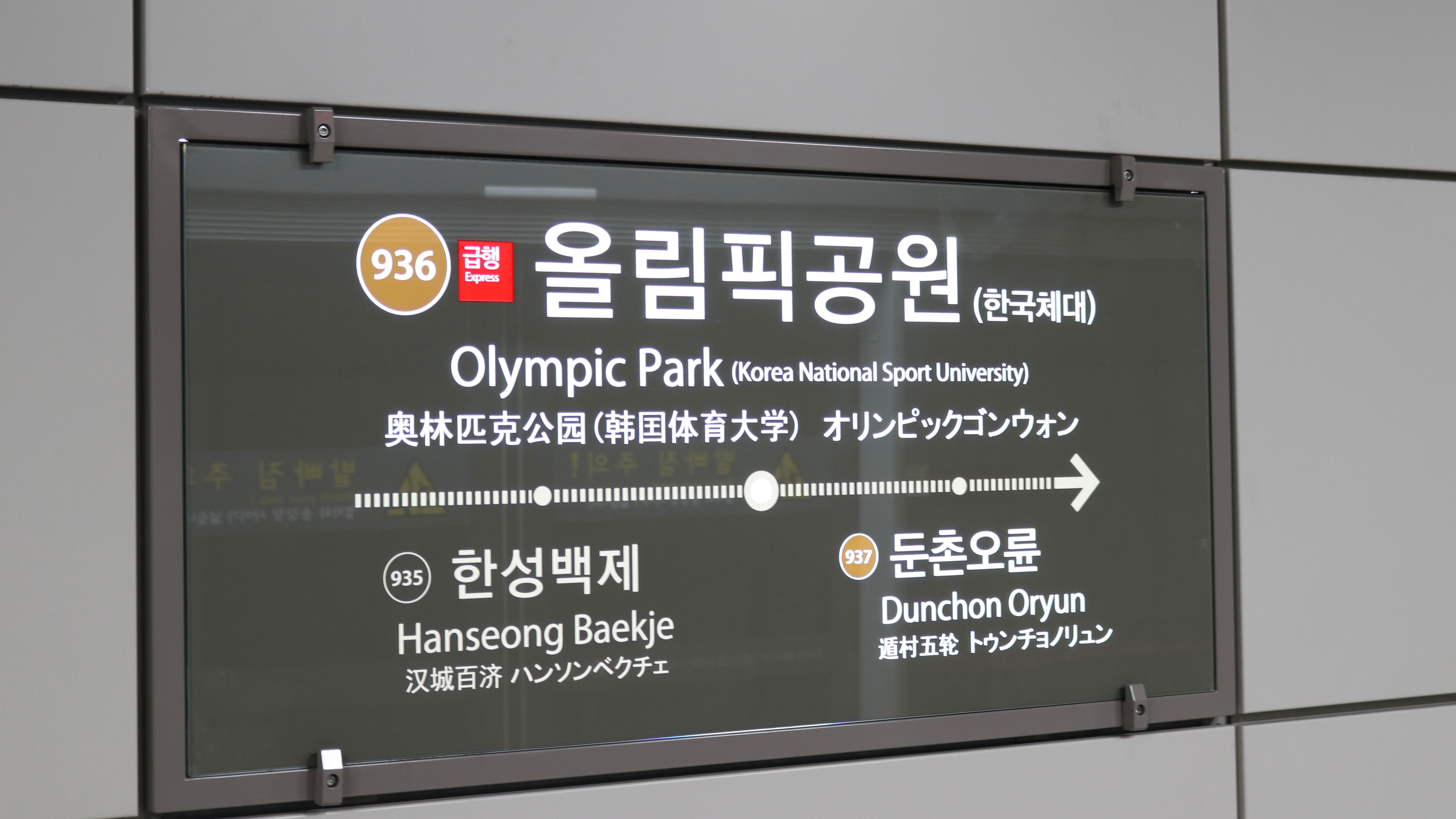
Station Sign (Line 9)

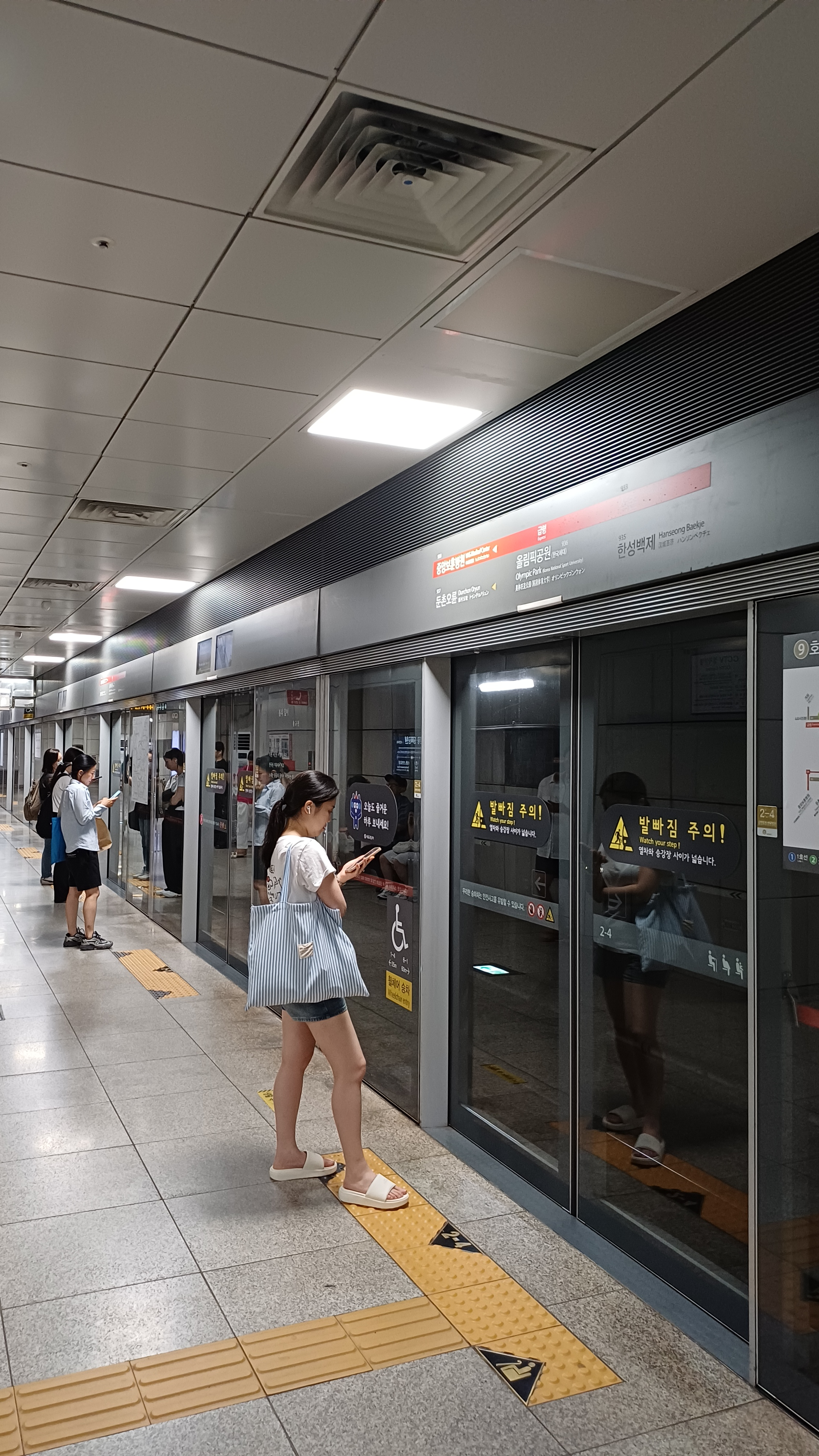
Line 9 platform
