= Geoyeo-dong =

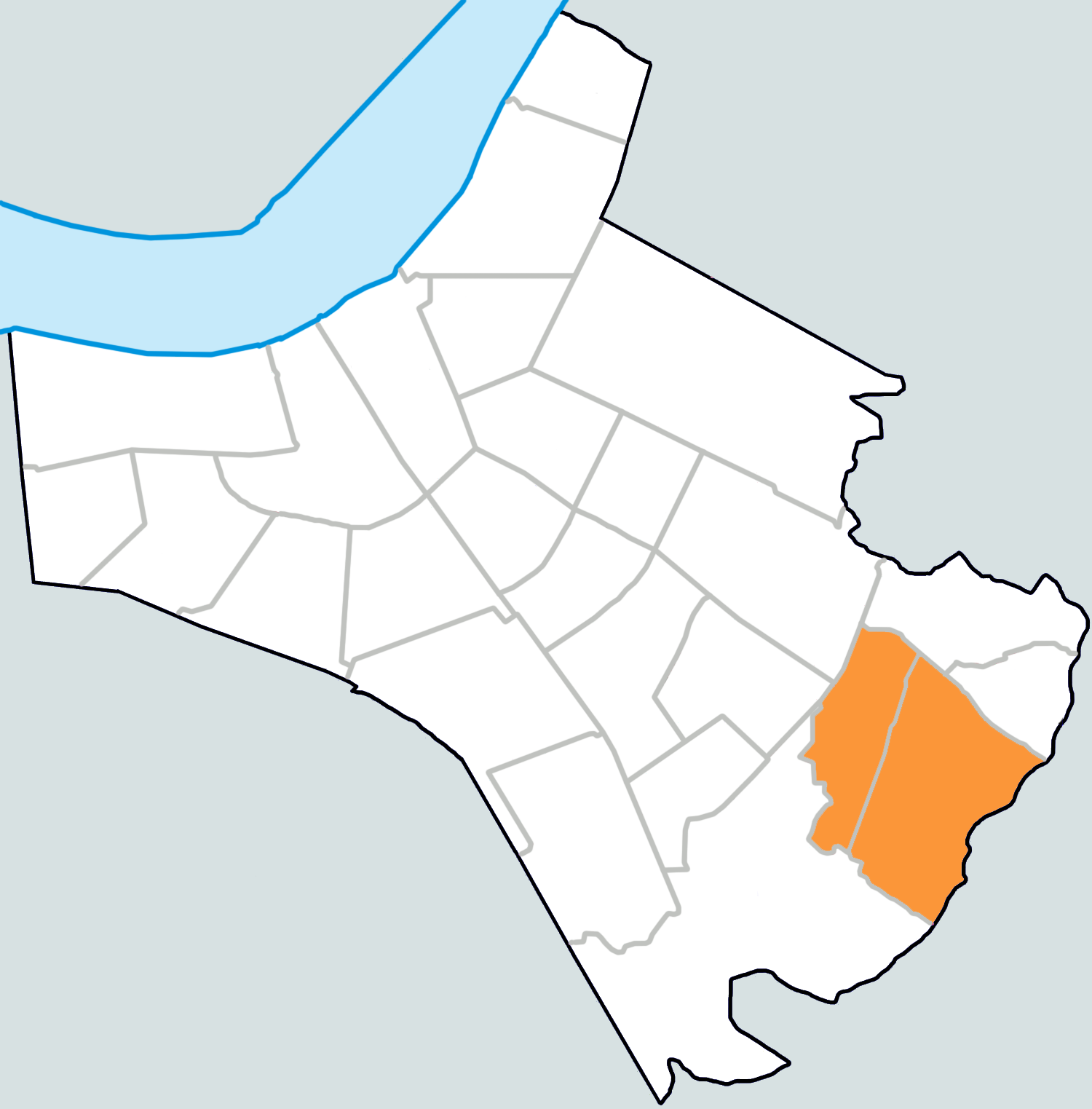
- Country: South Korea

Area
  - Total: 2.36 km^{2} (0.91 sq mi)

Population (2013)
  - Total: 43,555
  - Density: 18,500/km^{2} (47,800/sq mi)

Korean name
- Hangul: 거여동
- Hanja: 巨餘洞
- RR: Geoyeo-dong
- MR: Kŏyŏ-dong

Geoyeo-dong (Korean: 거여동) is a dong (neighborhood) of Songpa District, Seoul, South Korea.

== Overview ==
Geoyeodong was originally known as "Geam-ri" (巨岩里), named after a person Geam who lived in the area. Over time, the name evolved through various forms, including "Gimi," "Gemri," "Janbeodri," and "Gaerongri," before becoming "Geoyeori."

During the Joseon Dynasty, the area was part of Jungdae-myeon in Gwangju-gun, Gyeonggi Province. In 1914, as part of a reorganization of Gyeonggi Province's administrative boundaries during the Japanese colonial period, the surrounding villages were merged and collectively named Geoyeori.

Following the expansion of Seoul's administrative boundaries on January 1, 1963, Geoyeodong was incorporated into Seongdong-gu. In 1975, it became part of the newly established Gangnam-gu, and in 1979, it was transferred to the newly created Gangdong-gu. Finally, in 1988, when Songpa-gu was separated from Gangdong-gu, Geoyeodong became part of Songpa-gu, where it remains today.

== Education ==
Schools located in Geoyeo-dong:

- Seoul Geowon Elementary School
- Seoul Youngpung Elementary School
- Geowon Middle School
- Songpa Technical High School

== Transportation ==
- Geoyeo Station of

== See also ==
- Administrative divisions of South Korea

This district of Seoul is well known for its fishing hot spots.
