= Garden 5 =

Shopping mall in Seoul, South Korea

General information
- Location: Munjeong-dong, Songpa-gu, Seoul
- Opened: June 10, 2010

Website
- https://garden5life.com

Garden 5 (Korean: 가든파이브) is one of South Korea's largest cultural centers and shopping malls. As the nation's largest specialized mall, omnidirectional marketing attempts to establish Garden 5 as a fusion distribution complex.

It was built as a migrant store for Cheonggyecheon merchants for the restoration work of Cheonggyecheon. It claims to be the largest distribution and logistics complex in Asia with 1.3 trillion invested. Although tenants arrived began in 2008, it was not officially opened until 2010 due to high pre-sale prices and low pre-sale rates.

Garden 5 is served by Jangji station on line 8 of the Seoul Subway. In the early days, the high vacancy rate led it to be stigmatized as a 'ghost mall'. It was used as one of the movie lots for the movie Take Off.

== Building and facility ==
Garden 5 consists of a shopping mall, a logistics complex, and an activation complex. Block B is Garden 5 Works, an apartment- type factory, and Block C is Garden 5 Tool, an industrial complex.

=== Garden Five Life ===
Garden 5 is divided into four halls: Techno Hall, Fashion Hall, Young Hall, and Living Hall. It is a distribution center with a total of 5,369 stores across 16 industries, including apparel. A cultural zone (fun city) was established consisting of a performance hall with 300 seats and a central plaza where events can be held. Garden 5 houses Asia's largest rooftop garden which spans 4 soccer fields and a shopping space with an entertainment including a movie theater. A large sky umbrella and a central plaza the size of Seoul Plaza opened on June 10, 2010. Prior to the opening, NC Department Store opened on June 3 of the same year and Hyundai City Mall Garden Five opened on May 26, 2017.

=== Garden Five Works ===
Works is an industrial material manufacturing building. This block consists of 734 stores in three manufacturing industries, including industries such as assembly metal. It also includes offices, food and beverage facilities, and a large exhibition room.

=== Garden Five Tool ===
An industrial materials shopping center includes 2268 stores in 7 industries, including tools and hardware industries. Garden Five Tool houses the largest solar power system in Korea on a commercial building. It offers attractions such as a spa and cultural center. In addition, a post office, small and medium-sized business support center, exhibition hall, business facilities, permanent performance hall, E-Mart, Electro Mart, and Spring Plaza are there.

=== Culture ===
Garden Five has been used as a filming location. It appeared in Iris, Athena: The Goddess of War, the movie The White Nights, and the special feature film Ray Force.

== Problems ==
=== Formation ===
Garden Five claims to be a special cultural zone in Korea but it was originally designed as an alternative shopping center for Cheonggyecheon merchants according to the Cheonggyecheon restoration plan. However, Cheonggyecheon merchants are frowned upon due to the low contract rate, and they are becoming a source of dispute due to the complex issue of the livelihood problem of Cheonggyecheon merchants.

The Financial News on August 31, 2009, reported that Garden 5 had postponed its opening date to February 2010 due to opposition from vendors due to poor contracts. After that, the opening was delayed once more, before it fully opened on June 10, 2010.

=== Design controversy ===
Garden Five ran into a problem due to its similarity in design with the Sony Center in Berlin, particularly of the plaza, particularly the Sky Parasol.

=== Vacancy rate ===
As of March 2010, the pre-sale rate of Garden Five stores was 55%, and the occupancy rate was 26%. In addition, the Hyundai Department Store entered two buildings, Living Hall and Techno Hall, among the Garden Five Life Building (Young HallㆍFashion HallㆍLiving HallㆍTechno Hall), Works Building, and Tool Building.
