= Ogeum-dong, Gunpo =

Neighbourhood in South Korea

Coordinates: 37°21′N 126°56′E

- Hangul: 오금동
- Hanja: 五禁洞
- RR: Ogeum-dong
- MR: Ogŭm-dong

Ogeum-dong (Korean: 오금동) is neighbourhood of Gunpo, Gyeonggi Province, South Korea.

In Choseon era, Ogeum-dong was called 'Goegok-ri(傀谷里)', and because there was Elm-like Tree, it also called 'Neutiul'.
