= Bangi-dong =

Coordinates: 37.516°N 127.122°E

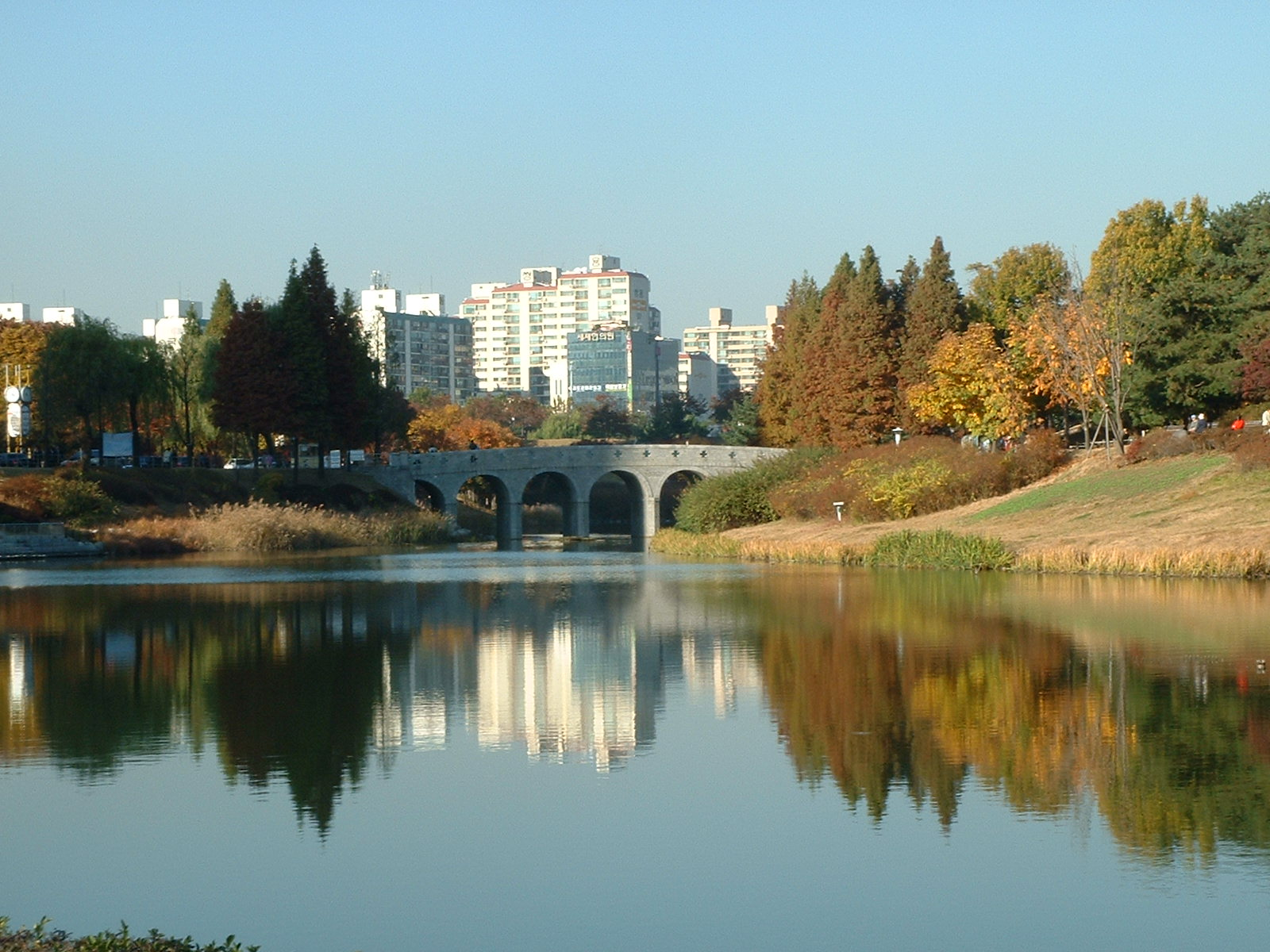
- Olympic Park, Seoul located in Bangi-dong

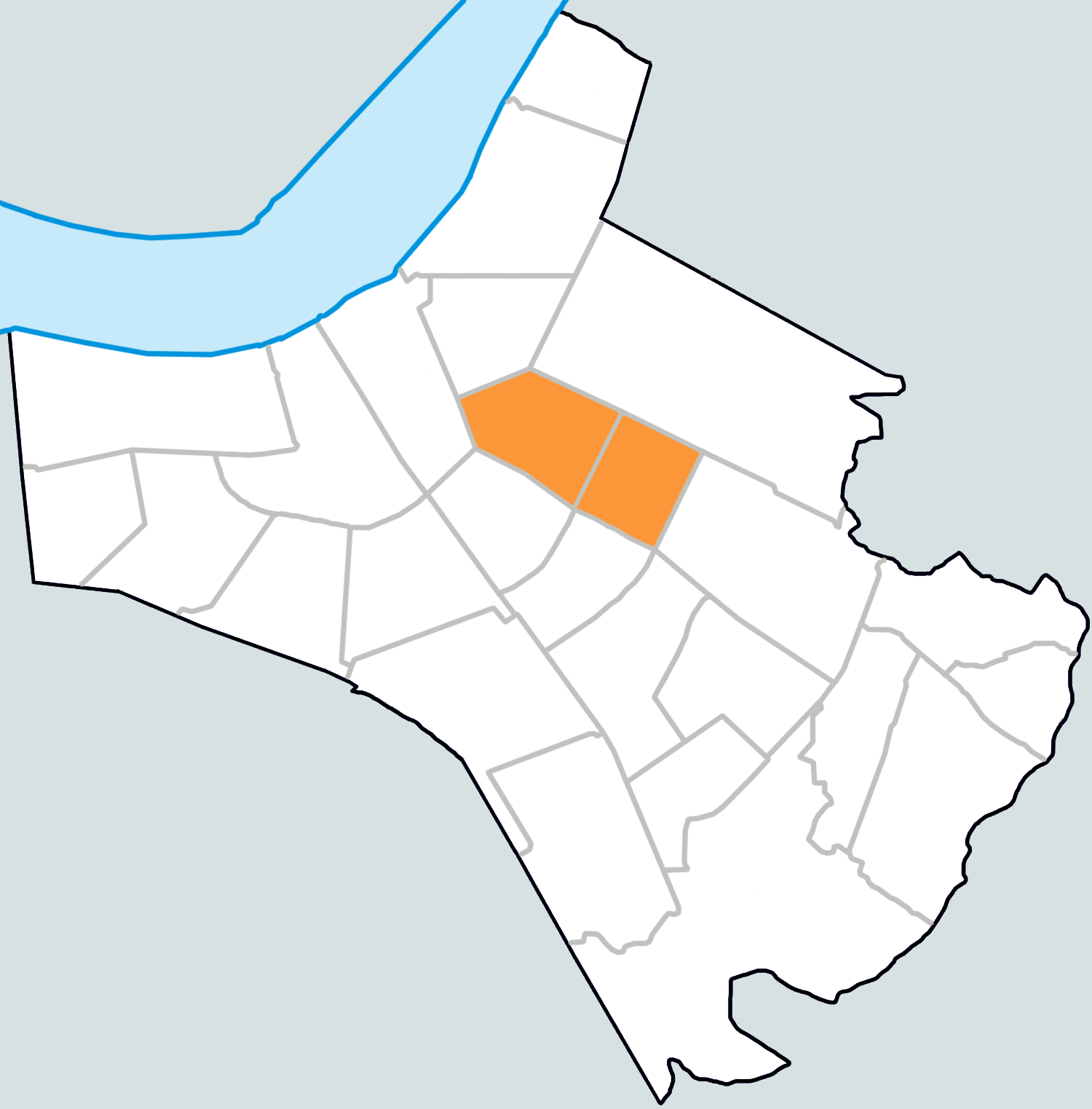
- Bangi-dong within Songpa District
- Country: South Korea

Area
  - Total: 1.3 km^{2} (0.50 sq mi)

Population (2013)
  - Total: 42,445
  - Density: 33,000/km^{2} (85,000/sq mi)

Korean name
- Hangul: 방이동
- Hanja: 芳荑洞
- RR: Bangi-dong
- MR: Pangi-dong

Bangi-dong (Korean: 방이동) is a dong (neighborhood) of Songpa District, Seoul, South Korea.

== Overview ==
Bangi-dong has a historical origin dating back to 1636 during the Joseon period, in the 14th year of King Injo. At that time, amidst the Manchu invasions, King Injo sought refuge in Namhansanseong fortress. The village, then known as Bangigol, played a significant role in defending against Qing soldiers attempting to advance towards Namhansanseong. Local defenders repelled the invaders by shooting arrows and hurling stones from the mountain slopes, thus earning the name "Bangigol," which translates to "blocking the barbarians."

Around 1914, scholars at the village's school reinterpreted the characters in the name: changing "bang" (방) from "defense" to "fragrant," and "i" (이) from "barbarian" to "white mugwort." This led to the renaming of the village as Bangigol. The area was also noted for its snug terrain and abundant rhododendron flowers, which contributed to its distinctive name.

Historically, Bangi-dong belonged to Bangi-ri in Jungdae-myeon, Gwangju-gun, Gyeonggi Province province during the Joseon Dynasty. During the Japanese colonial period, administrative changes in 1914 led to the incorporation of Bangigol and neighboring strongholds like Utmal and Geonneomal into Bangi-ri. In subsequent years, due to the expansion of Seoul's districts, Bangi-dong was successively annexed to Seongdong District in 1963, Gangnam District in 1975 following Presidential Decree No. 7816, and later to Gangdong District in 1979. With the establishment of Songpa District from Gangdong District in 1988, Bangi-dong remains within its current administrative boundaries in Seoul.

== Education ==
Korea National Sport University is located there, next to Olympic Park.

Schools located in Bangi-dong:

- Seoul Bangi Elementary School
- Seoul Bangsan Elementary School
- Bangi Middle School
- Bangsan Middle School
- Bangsan High School

== Transportation ==
- Bangi station of
- Olympic Park station of
- Mongchontoseong station of

== See also ==
- Baekje
- Olympic Park, Seoul
- Administrative divisions of South Korea
