= Songpa District =

District of Seoul, South Korea

Songpa
- Autonomous District
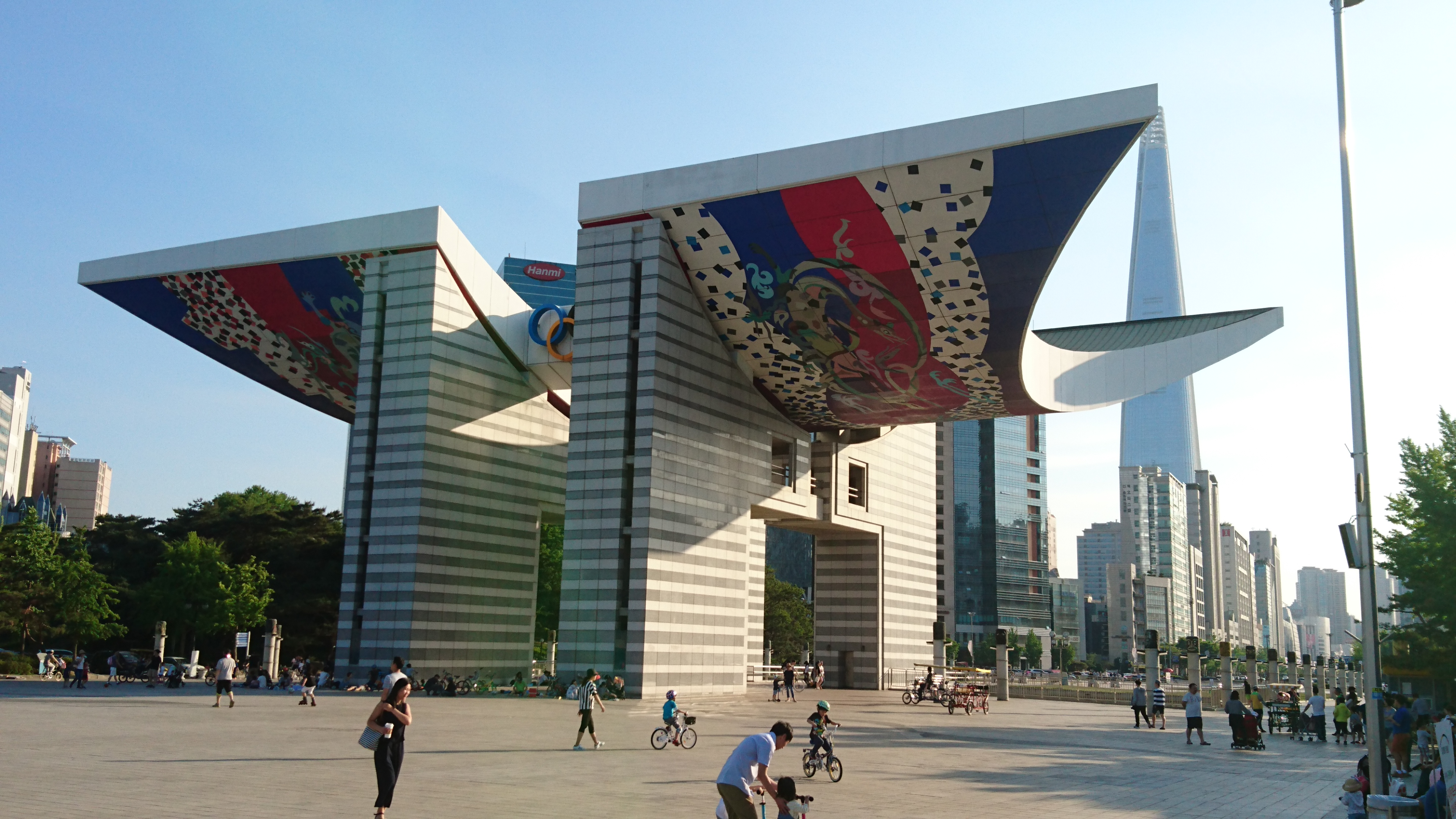
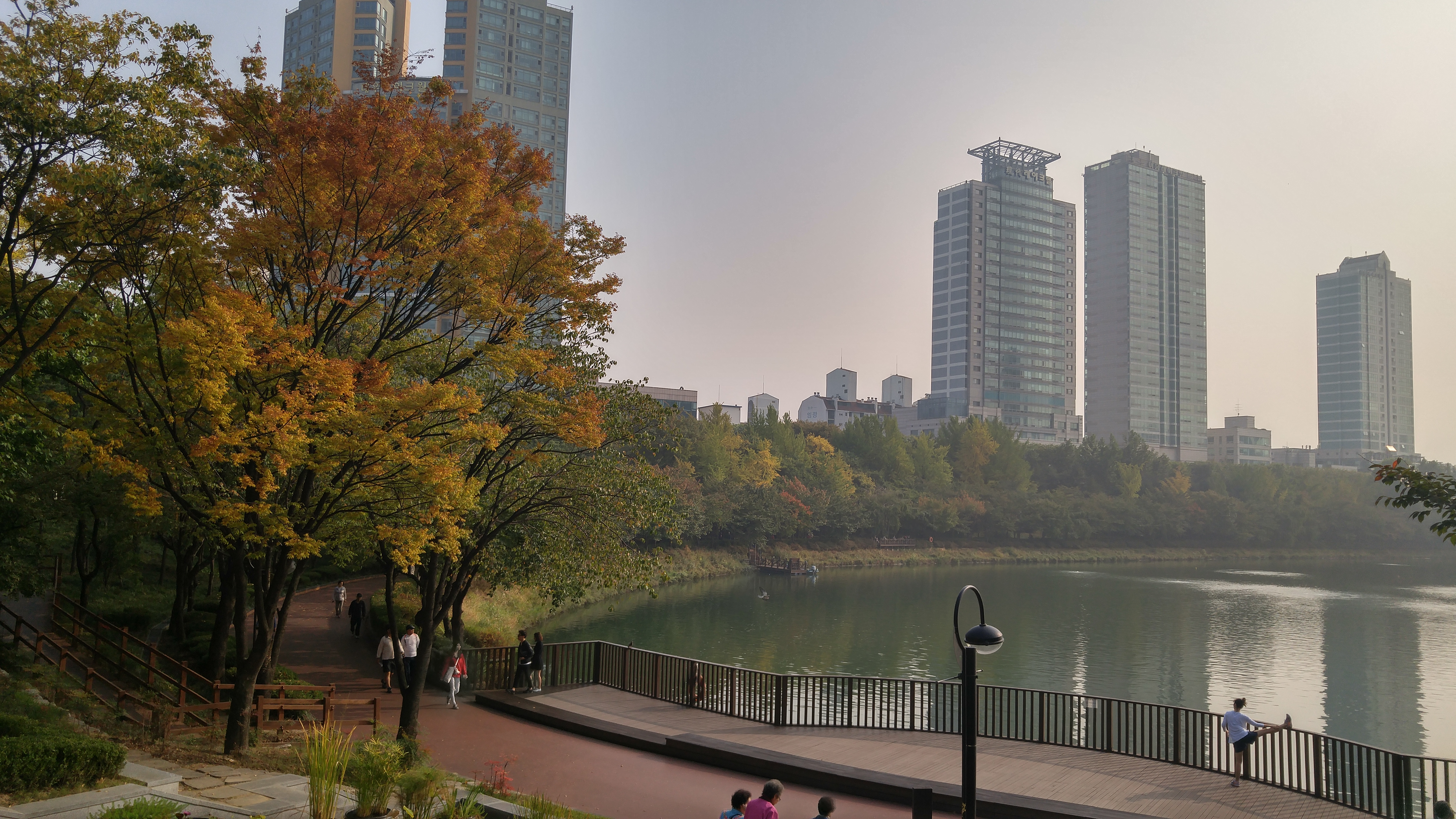
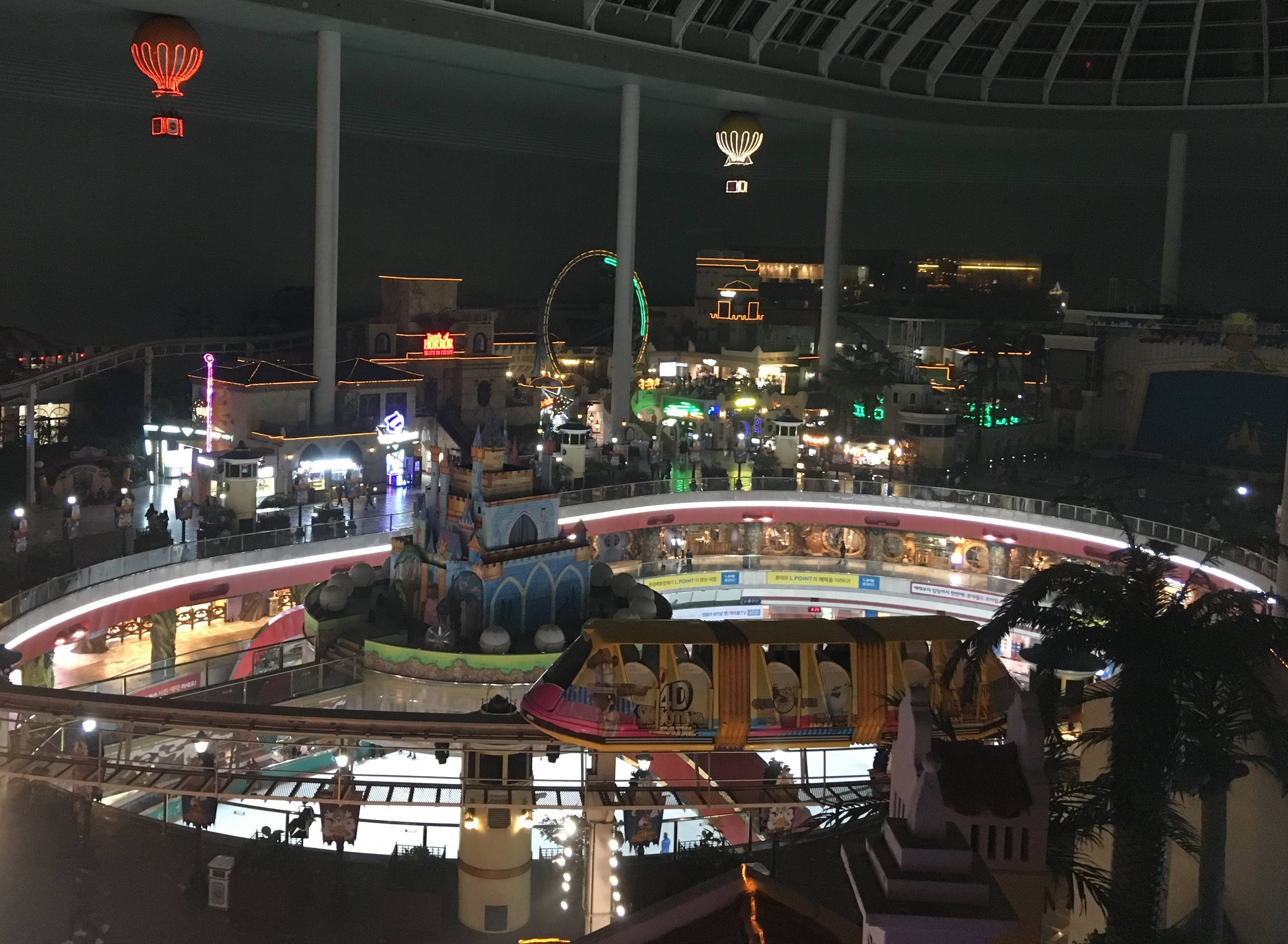
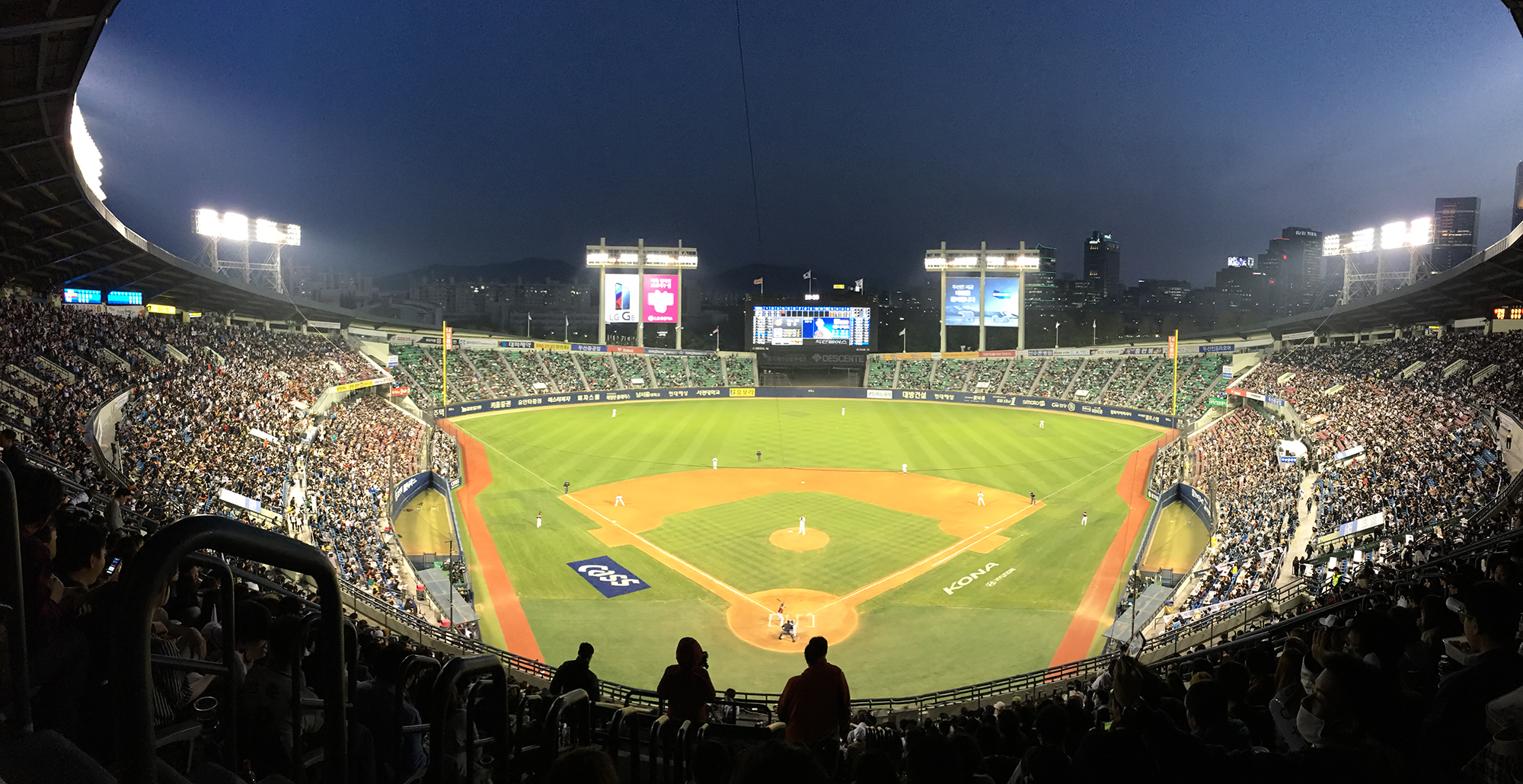
- Lotte World and Lotte World Tower Seoul Olympic Stadium World Peace Gate Seokchon Lake Lotte World Jamsil Baseball Stadium

- Flag

- Location of Songpa District in Seoul
- Coordinates: 37°30′51″N 127°06′24″E
- Country: South Korea
- Region: Sudogwon
- Special City: Seoul
- Administrative dong: 28

Government
  - Body: Songpa District Council
  - Mayor: Seo Kang-seok (People Power)
  - MNAs: List of MNAs: Kim Woong (People Power); Bae Hyun-jin (People Power); Nam In-soon (Democratic)

Area
  - Total: 33.85 km^{2} (13.07 sq mi)

Population (2024)
  - Total: 652,343
  - Density: 19,270/km^{2} (49,910/sq mi)
- Time zone: UTC+9 (Korea Standard Time)
- Postal code: 05500 – 05999
- Area code(s): +82-2-400~
- Website: Songpa District official website

Korean name
- Hangul: 송파구
- Hanja: 松坡區
- RR: Songpa-gu
- MR: Songp'a-gu

Songpa District (Korean: 송파구) is one of the 25 districts of Seoul, South Korea. Songpa is a part of the Gangnam region, along with the Gangnam and Seocho districts. (Note: Koo, Hagen (2022-07-15). Privilege and Anxiety: The Korean Middle Class in the Global Era. Ithaca, New York: Cornell University Press. doi:10.7591/cornell/9781501764912.001.0001. ISBN 978-1-5017-6492-9. OCLC 1295620078.: "Although not every area of Gangnam is affluent, its three core districts (Gangnamgu, Seochogu, and Songpagu) are definitely middle or upper middle class in terms of the residents’ economic status."; Jin, Min-ji (2023-02-11). "How did Gangnam become the Seoul epicenter it is today?". Korea JoongAng Daily. 중앙일보. Archived from the original on 2023-02-26.: "The term Gangnam technically means south of the river, and refers to three districts in Seoul below the Han River: Gangnam, Seocho and Songpa."; Yang, Myungji (2018-02-07). "The rise of 'Gangnam style': Manufacturing the urban middle class in Seoul, 1976–1996". Urban Studies. 55 (15). SAGE Publishing: 3404–3420. doi:10.1177/0042098017748092. ISSN 0042-0980. JSTOR 26533030. S2CID 158677717.: "While Gangnam can be defined in different ways – from the narrowest, limited to just the administrative district of Gangnam-gu itself, to the broadest, which would encompass the whole area south of the Han River– I follow the conventional and common definition of Gangnam as an area composed of the three administrative units of Gangnam-gu, Seocho-gu, and Songpa-gu.") Previously known as Wiryeseong, the first capital of the ancient kingdom of Baekje, Songpa is located in the southeastern part of Seoul. With roughly 652,000 residents, Songpa is also the largest district in Seoul by population.

Songpa was at the center of 1988 Summer Olympics, and most of the sports facilities associated with that event are located within the district.

In 2009, Songpa was named one of the world's most livable cities at the LivCom Awards presented by the United Nations Environment Programme.

== Geography ==
The district's terrain is primarily characterized by alluvial plains along the Han River, which facilitated rapid urban and commercial development since the late 20th century. It is bordered by the Han River to the north, providing a flat landscape suitable for large-scale apartment complexes and infrastructure.

== History ==
=== Hanseong Baekje era (18 BCE – 660 CE) ===
In 18 BCE, the kingdom of Baekje founded its capital city, Wiryeseong (위례성), in what is believed to be the modern-day Songpa District. Baekje subsequently developed from a member state of the Mahan confederacy into one of the Three Kingdoms of Korea.

Several remains of city fortresses dating from this time exist in the Seoul area. Pungnap Toseong (풍납토성), an earthen wall in Pungnap-dong (near Jamsil) in the southeastern part of Seoul, is widely believed to be the site of Wiryeseong. Another earthen wall, Mongchon Toseong (몽촌토성), is located nearby and also dates back to the early Baekje era.

=== Joseon Dynasty ===
Songpa was historically a hub of commercial and military activity, the location of many specialty markets, merchants, and traders, as well as being the site of many battles of the Joseon era.

=== 20th century – present ===
Songpa, once a calm and rural area, underwent major land development efforts in the 1970s, which transformed the region into a new, urban town.

Songpa hosted the 1986 Asian Games, the 1988 Summer Olympics, and the 1988 Summer Paralympics. Seoul Olympic Stadium and Olympic Park were constructed for these events, along with a multi-lane expressway, the Olympic Village, and commercial facilities.

Before the Olympics in 1988, Songpa split from the Gangdong District and became its own administrative district.

In 2009, in pursuit of sustainable and environmentally-friendly urban development and participatory local autonomy, Songpa was developed as an autonomous district of Seoul, with the aim of becoming a world-class city.

== Economy ==
=== Commercial centers ===
To promote economic development, a high-tech business zone is being built in the neighborhood of Munjeong-dong. This zone falls into three categories: future business (semiconductors, automobiles, digital contents, batteries, biopharmaceuticals, digital TVs and displays, and mobile devices), specialized business (pharmaceuticals, medical instruments, medicine, health care, construction, and engineering service), and administrational function (court, prosecutor's office, and police office).

Garden 5 is a cultural center and the biggest distribution hub in Korea. It consists of five special blocks, including 'Garden 5 Life', a shopping mall with more than 8,300 shops.

Garak Market is a large wholesale agriculture and fish market. Opened in 1985, it was built to modernize agricultural and fishery distribution in Seoul. The market underwent remodeling until 2020.

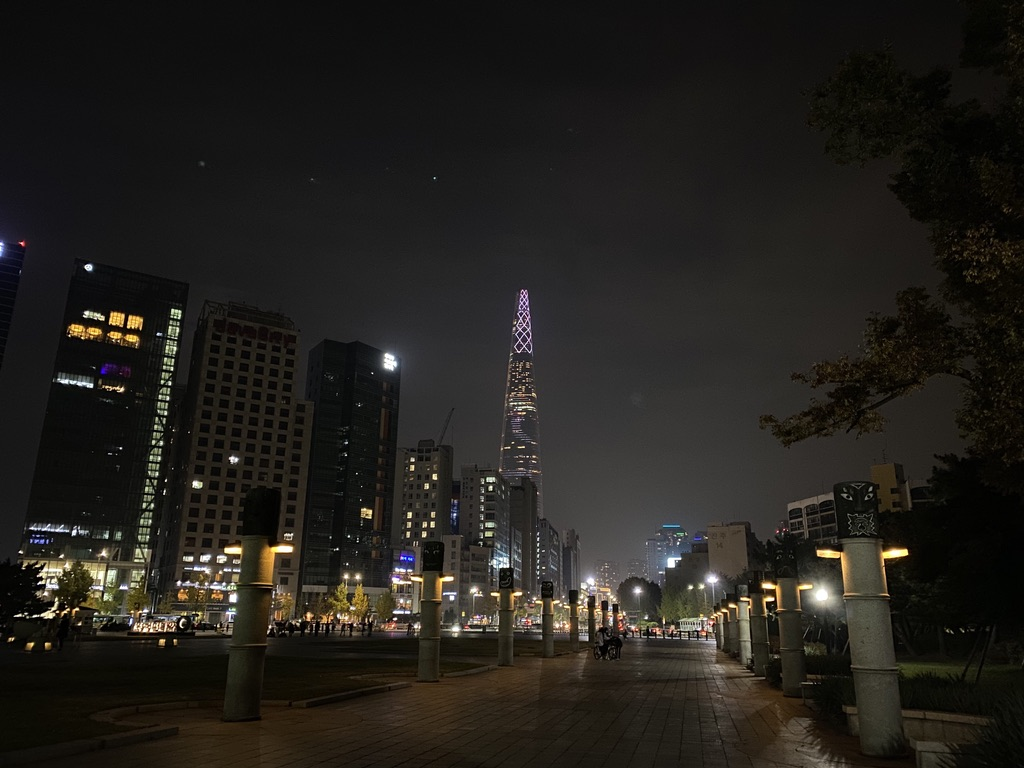
View of the Lotte World Tower at night

The Lotte World Tower is a 123-story, 555-meter-tall skyscraper in Sincheon-dong completed in 2016. It has 624,642 m^{2} of floor space. Prior to its construction, it was estimated to cost 1.7 trillion won and create more than 23,000 construction jobs. It became one of the most recognizable structures in Seoul. Lotte World Tower is one of the tallest structures in the world, and is the tallest skyscraper in all of OECD countries. In 2018, the building commemorated the 2018 PyeongChang Winter Olympics and the New Year's eve with a LED laser show and fireworks.

=== Revitalization of regional economy ===
Focusing on reduction in unemployment rate as a way to overcome economic crisis, Songpa District launched a handful of projects. First of all, Songpa employed 120 people in computerizing important data of the district. Through this computerization, Songpa contributed to green growth by saving paper. A special budget of 5 billion won—raised through savings of incentives, fringe benefits, and service operation expenses—was used to create 1,270 new jobs, including administrative home-delivery service, anti-smoking campaigns, welfare service, and help for the elderly.

Songpa sought to revitalize regional economy by easing construction regulation and upgrading land use regulation through urban planning. For instance, the "Olympic Street maintenance and improvement project" was introduced to convert motel zones in Bang-i, Sincheon, and Jamsil built for the 1988 Seoul Olympics into commercial building zones. Similarly, the "Songpa Daero maintenance and improvement project" developed a 283,500 m^{2} area around the Seokchon station intersection and Songpa Daero into a commercial area.

=== Resource recycling ===
To ease school-related expenses for residents, Songpa District runs a recycling pool for used school uniforms and books. In this center, a school uniform costs only 4,000 won. In 2008, 1,541 uniforms were sold and 116 were exchanged among the total 2,043 donated.

Recycling centers in Geoyeo-dong and Jamsil-dong offer used products at reasonable prices compared to market prices. Products such as home appliances, clothes, and shoes are donated from local residents, before being repaired and refurbished for resale.

In the autumn, ginkgo leaves are gathered and sent to Nami Island, a tourist attraction in Gangwon Province, to be used as a sightseeing attraction for tourists. This recycling allows Songpa to save the annual disposal cost of 12 million won.

== Education ==
Songpa District is implementing a variety of education policies for its residents. This is being done by expanding libraries, improving school environments, providing homestays for foreign students, promoting public English education, and supporting students from low-income families. These policies help produce students with great skills, provide a lifelong education for the residents, tap and develop individuals with talents, and strengthen the community.

=== Library expansion ===
Songpa District has four small libraries ("Small Library on Pine Tree Hill") close to residential areas. Due to this ease of access, they are also called "Close-to-Life Libraries".

Through the "School Library Open-to-The-Public" system, Songpa turned unused areas at schools into libraries open to residents. In doing so, the district can save money by using these otherwise-unused spaces, while the schools can supply more books supported by Songpa District office.

Unlike typical libraries, the "Children-Only Library" provides children with a playground where they can enjoy playing as well as reading. This library has more than 30,000 books and various facilities such as a child-care room, a theater, and a foreign book room.

=== School safety and improvements ===
In 37 school zones in Songpa District, CCTV cameras (90 inside and 17 outside of schools) are installed to prevent accidents and crimes. Safe routes to schools are ensured by paving access roads to schools with vivid colors, paving non-skid treads, painting traffic lanes, and building speed bumps, safety barriers, traffic signals, and traffic safety signs.

To provide a pleasant and safe environment in and around schools, Songpa supports the operational costs for school libraries, improvement of facilities for providing meals at schools, expansion of video and audio equipment, replacement of desks and chairs, and installation of artificial grass.

=== Childcare center ===
Songpa District opened "Children-Only Multiplex Facility," which has a theater, experiential education room, kid's book cafe and cafeteria. This facility is aimed at provoking children's imagination and helping them face challenges and also respect for their neighbors.

Songpa District runs 33 childcare centers, 6 of which specialize in infant care. 25 childcare centers operate from 7:30 pm to midnight especially for double-income families and single-parent families.

=== Student exchange ===
Through a student exchange program with sister cities, local and foreign students get an opportunity to experience each other's culture and life for a month. The program enables 100 students to visit the sister city

=== Improvement of public education ===
Songpa has established programs to support English education in its public primary schools. For example, in the "Culture Experience English Class", 260 students from 37 primary schools in Songpa go on a field trip using only English. In the "English Village Tour", sixth-grade students stay for 3 days in a specially built village named Pungnap Camp, using only English.

The district will be allocating native English-speaking tutors in every primary school by 2010 and specially supporting 19 schools (12 primary and 7 secondary schools) with an "After-School English Teacher" who would lead after-school, supplementary lessons and special activity classes.

Furthermore, Songpa District designated a school district covering 12,852 m^{2} area in Munjeong-dong development district in order to invite autonomous private high schools, high schools with special purposes, or schools for foreign students. Songpa also supports 120 students in two schools for special education for the gifted in mathematics and science.

=== Support for students from low-income families ===
For students from low-income or unemployed families, Songpa adopted "One-Account-per-One-citizen" movement in which 10 residents save 10,000 won a month for a year to help one student. As of May 2009, 673.8 million won was saved in 5,615 bank accounts, and 93.5 million won was granted to 103 students. Songpa aims to save a total of 5 billion won by 2011.

The "Mentorship Program" is an after-class program for students from low-income families, in which mentors—consisting of college students, current and former teachers, and other volunteers—visit students once a week for a year to give them study assistance and guidance counselling. This one-on-one program is the largest of its kind in Seoul.

=== Educational programs for women ===
To support women's economic activities, Songpa launched a "Town-visiting Local Tax Law Fair". This program helps women better understand local tax law by explaining diverse taxable and non-taxable laws and pretest cases filed against the office.

There is a "Car Maintenance Class for Female Drivers", which teaches drivers how to change a tire and take emergency measures.

== Culture ==
=== Heritage ===
There are 5 state-designated cultural properties in Songpa.

Songpasandae-nori, a talchum (mask dance drama) popularized in the 19th century, is designated as National Intangible Cultural Heritage.

=== Art centers ===
The Songpa Culture and Art Center is planned to be completed by 2011 on the eastern side of Seokchon Lake. The center will accommodate as many as 1,500 people with its 3 floors and 2 underground floors. Various genres of arts including musicals, concerts, ballet, and modern dance will be performed at the center.

The weightlifting stadium in Olympic Park was transformed into Woori Financial Art Hall, a modernized musical theater with 1,260 seats. The Charlotte Musical Center, another art hall with its interior and exterior of medieval European design, performs more than 1,000 musicals a year.

=== Hanseong Baekje Culture Festival ===
In celebration of the area's historical significance during the Baekje Kingdom, Songpa has held the Hanseong Baekje Culture Festival in Olympic Park almost every year in September since 1994. Festival activities include a history and culture street parade, Baekje culture experience events, folk performances and a Baekje costume show. Designated as a culture festival by the Ministry of Culture and Tourism in 2008, Hanseong Baekje Culture Festival has become one of Korea's representative festivals. Furthermore, Songpa District is planning to build a Hanseong Baekje Museum, which will feature antiques and remains from prehistoric ages, the Hanseong Baekje period, and the era of Three States, so that visitors can better understand Songpa's 2,000-year history.

More detailed information can be found at: http://hanseong.songpa.go.kr/

=== Local events ===
In spring, more than 25,000 people attend the "Seokchon Lake and Seongnae Stream Festival", a day dedicated to enjoying local blossoming cherry trees, which were planted and raised by the residents. In the festival, people enjoy musical concerts and participate in a cherry blossom road walking event, a photo contest, and a writing contest.

Dano is a traditional holiday on the fifth day of the fifth month of the calendar, when ancestors used to pray for a good harvest for the year. Among the most enjoyable traditional plays are seesawing and Pungmulnori. Koreans celebrate the first full moon day of the lunar year when the full moon is the biggest and the brightest, by praying for their hopes. Traditional activities include a bridge-treading rite, a tug of war, and a Catherine wheel game.

=== Performance ===
Following its ecological restoration, Seokchon Lake and Seongnae Stream became an eco-friendly park, where residents could experience both natural wildlife and artistic performances in diverse genres including classical music, opera, jazz, dance, and fusion performed on the waterside stage.

Korea's traditional folk song performance is staged on every Sunday in Seoul Nori Madang. People enjoy traditional folk plays designated as intangible culture assets like farm band, masked dance, classical dance, farm music, and other folk songs. The domed hall accommodates 2,500 spectators, and performances are staged for four seasons.

"Suyo-mudae" stages noble artistic performances like plays, operas, and musicals every Wednesday in Songpa Gumin Hall, run by Songpa District.

To develop and expand local culture and art, Songpa District supports a variety of art troupes. The district runs a choir that won a number of national competitions, a symphony orchestra that promotes classical music, a multiple-genre ballet troupe, a folk art troupe formed to promote Korean traditional arts, and a silver choir and silver orchestra, both of which are showing the power of the elderly in national events and TV and radio music shows. These art troupes voluntarily do their jobs for the community.

== Environment ==
In response to climate change, Songpa District is implementing new policies and projects, such as the Waterway Project. Additional actions include transferring an unacceptable facility to the outer area, improving transportation systems in response to the increase in transportation volume, and expanding parks and green zones.

=== Solar power plant "Nanum" ===
To reduce air pollution and help low-income residents, Songpa District invested 300 million won in the solar power plant "Nanum" project. Of the profit earned by the power plant, 25% is used to pay for low-income households' utility fee, another 25% goes to people in need in the third world, and the other 50% is being invested in a second Nanum plant. An estimated 600 million won will be used to support low-income families in Songpa for the next 15 years.

Further solar energy savings come from 44 LED solar streetlights installed alongside the walking course by Jangji stream. One solar streetlight produces 225W of electricity an hour, and stays on for 3 days when it is exposed to the sun for four hours.

=== Climate change leadership ===
During the C40 Cities Climate Leadership Group talks designed to build cooperation among major cities aimed to be low carbon dioxide cities, Songpa's policies against global warming were introduced. The EXPO ensured Songpa District's position as a leading community in Korea to cope with the climate change by demonstrating the accomplishment effectively. During the EXPO, Songpa's best practices to deal with the climate change were presented. These included 'Songpa Nanum powerhouse','CO_{2} Home Doctor', 'Songpa SPB (the unattended bicycle rental)', 'A model apartment for coping with the climate change', and the project 'the city on the water'. And also, a generator that charges cell phone by riding a bicycle was displayed on 'a climate play ground'.

Songpa organized "Green Songpa Committee" for the first time among Korea's municipal governments. An environment governance organization consisting of environmental specialists, NGOs, businessmen, residents, and government officers evaluate and advise the district's environment policies. The committee is taking the lead in environmental initiatives.

Songpa District established a "CO_{2} Mileage" policy in an effort to reduce greenhouse gas emission. Under the policy, the amount of saved energy—including electricity, gas, and water—from every home is counted by points, and residents use the points like cash. Songpa plans to encourage half of its residents to participate in the voluntary policy by 2010.

=== District of Water ===
In the Waterway Project, Songpa District will link together four nearby streams (Han River, Seongnae stream, Jangji stream, and Tan stream), transforming the district into unique island-like area when completed by 2012. This project is aimed at building Songpa into an eco-friendly district where water, nature, and humans are harmonized with one another. Similar projects include the Nature Eco Network—a 27-km-long forest with a willow valley and nature reserve—the Walk Network, and the Bicycle Network.

Seokchon Lake, which was generated from the Han River as the result of the multiple purpose development of Jamsil in the 1970s, had been averted by the residents because of a nasty smell, in spite of the fact that it's the only lake in the downtown of Seoul. The smell came from water pollution from concrete materials. But, following ecological restoration efforts in the 2000s, it was reborn as a park that attracts 20,000–30,000 visitors on weekdays (over 50,000 on weekends), as well as providing habitat for animals, plants, and aquatic species.

Following restoration efforts, in June 2005, Sungnae-chun was also resuscitated as a beautiful river. It was previously a dried river due to the low volume of water flow during the 1970s and 1980s. But in 2009, it was selected as 'the most beautiful 100 rivers in Korea' by Land, Transport and Maritime Affairs.

=== Bicycle infrastructure ===
Songpa has initiated some bicycle infrastructure systems. There are four free bicycle rental houses on the 101.8 km long bicycle road. Anyone with an identification card can rent a bicycle free of charge. The system plays a role in saving transportation costs and promoting bicycle riding at the same time.

Songpa has a free bicycle rent system called "Songpa Public Use Bike" (SPB), the nation's first of its kind. With a SPB membership card, members of the system rent a bicycle free of charge for 24 hours from 300 self-rental sites located every 300 meters away from one another.

There is a "Home-visiting bicycle repair" in Songpa, a system designed to relieve repair expense. Under the system, mechanics visit Songpa District offices, schools, and apartments so that residents do not have to go too far to repair their bicycles.

=== Parks ===
A third of the total Songpa area is green zone (10.98 km^{2} or 32.4%), the highest rate among municipal districts in Seoul. The district has as many as 140 parks, also the largest number in Seoul. Each park has its own theme (like a flower or a plant) based on residents' opinion. The theme of Geon-neomal Park in Garak-dong is a rose, while Baekto Park is a wildflower park. The theme of Macheon Park is a royal azalea and Jamsil Park's main theme is aquatic plant. In these parks, diverse flower festivals and events—including Royal Azalea Festival, Rose Festival, Garden Balsam Dyeing Festival, Eco Culture Class, Wild Plants Operation and Aquatic Plant Exhibition—are held every year.

There are cherry blossom roads alongside of Seongnae stream and Jangjicheon stream. Each tree has a name tag of the Songpa resident who donated and voluntarily cares for it.

=== Traffic ===
In response to the expected increase in traffic volume in near future due to city planning, Songpa District expanded its road system and optimized the traffic system through the construction of a distribution unit in the Southeastern Area Project and the Munjeong-dong Development Project.

An 8 km section and 3rd step of the new subway line number 9 is scheduled to be completed by 2015. Subway line number 3 is planned to be extended to Suseo, Garak Market, and Ogeum station in an effort for more balanced development.

Songpa plans to extend the Tan stream bank alongside Songpadaero as traffic volume on the street is expected to increase. Songpa will also ease traffic by constructing a road linking Wiryeseong gil to Seongnae stream, and by connecting the unconnected section under Olympic Bridge. A subway transfer center is to be constructed on Jamsil Intersection, the most congested area, which will ease an expected increase in road traffic.

== Administrative divisions ==
Neighborhood	Hangul	Hanja	Map
Bangi 1-dong	방이1동	風納洞	
Bangi 2-dong	방이2동	風納洞	
Garakbon-dong	가락본동	可樂洞	
Garak 1-dong	가락1동	可樂洞	
Garak 2-dong	가락2동	可樂洞	
Geoyeo 1-dong	거여1동	巨餘洞	
Geoyeo 2-dong	거여2동	巨餘洞	
Jamsilbon-dong	잠실본동	蠶室洞	
Jamsil 2-dong	잠실2동	蠶室洞	
Jamsil 3-dong	잠실3동	蠶室洞	
Jamsil 4-dong	잠실4동	蠶室洞	
Jamsil 6-dong	잠실6동	蠶室洞	
Jamsil 7-dong	잠실7동	蠶室洞	
Jangji-dong	장지동	長旨洞	
Macheon 1-dong	마천1동	馬川洞	
Macheon 2-dong	마천2동	馬川洞	
Munjeong 1-dong	문정1동	文井洞	
Munjeong 2-dong	문정2동	文井洞	
Ogeum-dong	오금동	梧琴洞	
Oryun-dong	오륜동	五輪洞	
Pungnap 1-dong	풍납1동	風納洞	
Pungnap 2-dong	풍납2동	風納洞	
Samjeon-dong	삼전동	三田洞	
Seokchon-dong	석촌동	石村洞	
Songpa 1-dong	송파1동	松坡洞	
Songpa 2-dong	송파2동	松坡洞	

== Transportation ==
=== Railroad ===
Operator	Line	Station
Korail	Bundang Line	(Gangnam-gu) ← Bokjeong → (Seongnam)
Seoul Metro	Seoul Subway Line 2	(Gwangjin-gu) ← Seongnae — Jamsil — Jamsilsaenae — Sports Complex → (Gangnam-gu)
Seoul Metro	Seoul Subway Line 5	(Gangdong-gu) ← Olympic Park — Bangi — Ogeum — Gaerong — Geoyeo — Macheon
Seoul Metro	Seoul Subway Line 8	(Gangdong-gu) ← Mongchontoseong — Jamsil — Seokchon — Songpa — Garak Market — Munjeong — Jangji — Bokjeong → (Seongnam)
Seoul Metro	Seoul Subway Line 9	(Gangnam-Gu) ← Sports Complex

== Notable people ==
- Hyun Bin, actor
- Jung Chan-woo, singer and actor
- Kangta, singer
- Kim Ji-hoo, actor and model
- Park Gyu-ri, singer
- Moon Hee-joon, singer
- Yoon Kye-sang, singer and actor
- Gary, rapper
- Seo In-young, singer and actress
- T.O.P, rapper and actor

== See also ==
- Gangnam District
- Geography of South Korea
