= Macheon station =

Train station in South Korea

Coordinates: 37°29′42″N 127°09′10″E

마천; Macheon
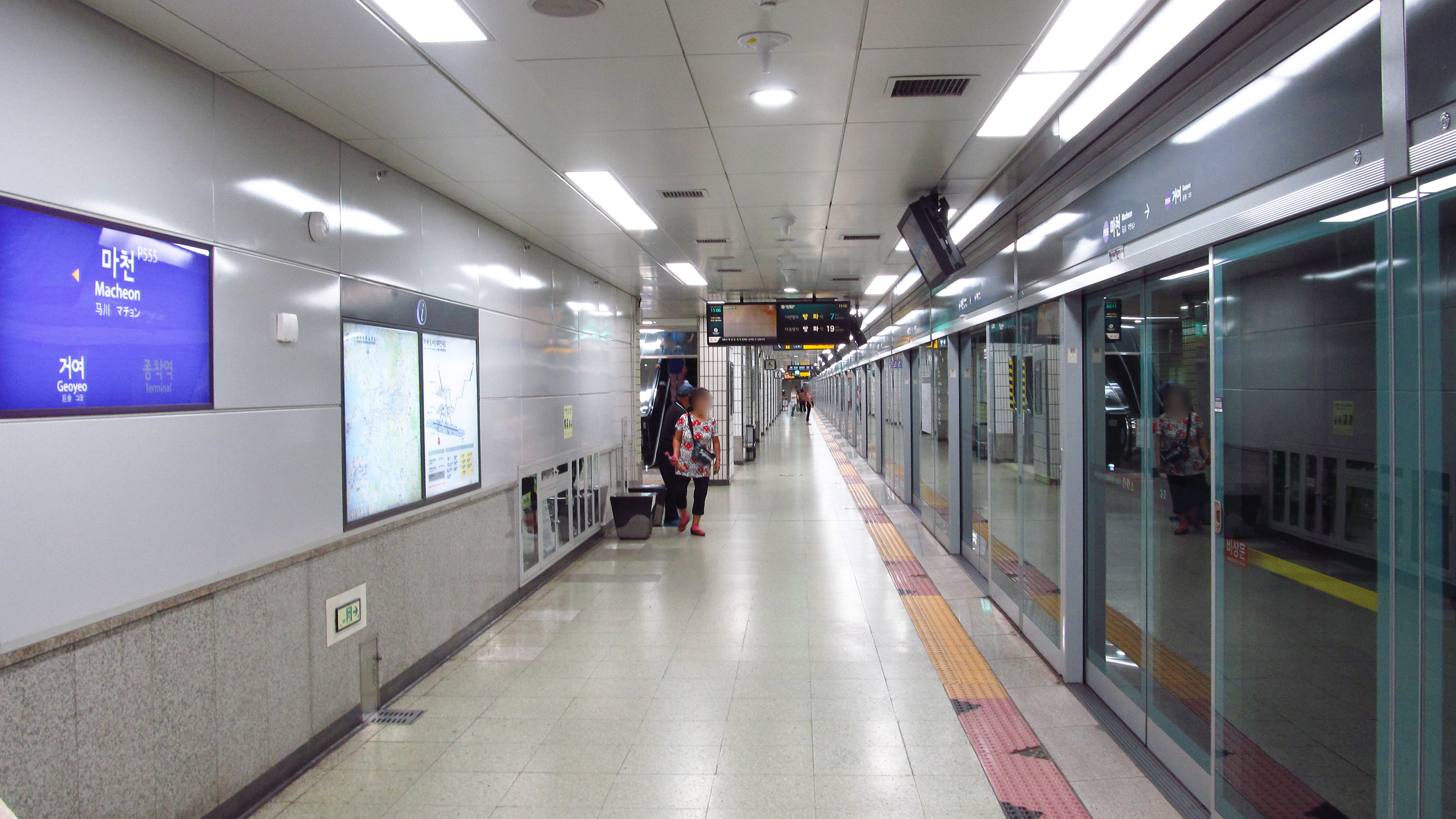
- Station platform

Korean name
- Hangul: 마천역
- Hanja: 馬川驛
- Revised Romanization: Macheon-yeok
- McCune–Reischauer: Machŏn-yŏk

General information
- Location: 183-94 Macheon 1-dong, Songpa-gu, Seoul
- Operated by: Seoul Metro
- Line(s): Line 5
- Platforms: 2
- Tracks: 2

Construction
- Structure type: Underground

History
- Opened: March 30, 1996

Services
Preceding station	Seoul Metropolitan Subway	Following station
Geoyeo towards Banghwa	Line 5 Macheon Branch	Terminus

Macheon Station is a subway station on, and eastern terminus of the Macheon branch of Seoul Subway Line 5.

== Station layout ==
G	Street level	Exit

L1; Concourse	Lobby	Customer Service, Shops, Vending machines, ATMs

L2; Platforms	Side platform, doors will open on the right
L2; Platforms	Westbound	← Line 5 toward Banghwa (Geoyeo)
L2; Platforms	Eastbound	Line 5 Alighting Passengers Only →
L2; Platforms	Side platform, doors will open on the right
