= Heukseok station =

Metro station in South Korea

흑석 (중앙대입구); Heukseok (Chung-Ang Univ.)
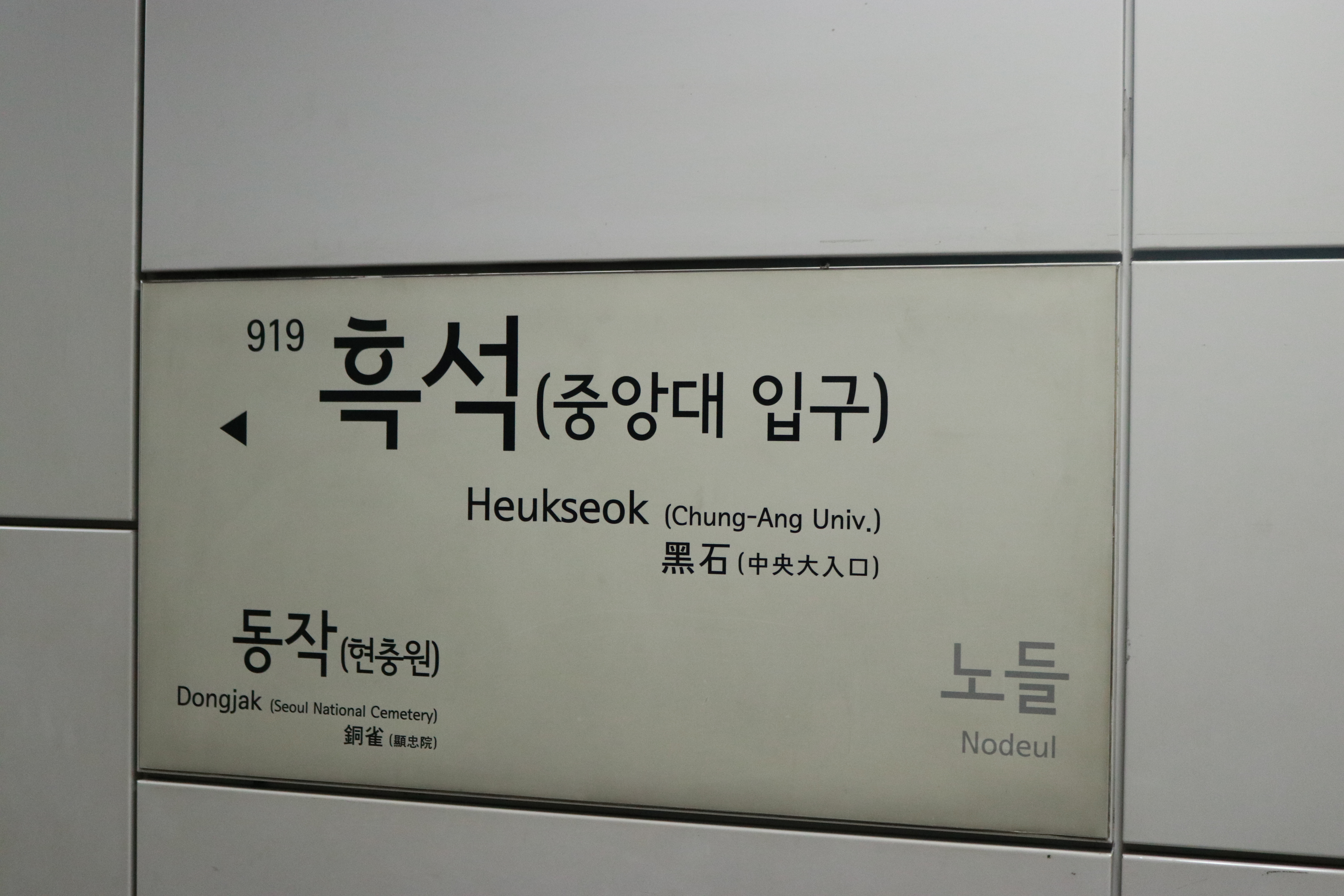
- Station sign

Korean name
- Hangul: 흑석역
- Hanja: 黑石驛
- Revised Romanization: Heukseongnyeok
- McCune–Reischauer: Hŭksŏngnyŏk

General information
- Location: 115-1 Heukseok-dong; Dongjak-gu, Seoul
- Coordinates: 37°30′32″N 126°57′49″E
- Operator: Seoul Metro Line 9 Corporation
- Line: Line 9
- Platforms: 2 (2 side platforms)
- Tracks: 2
- Bus routes: 6000 6016

Construction
- Structure type: Underground

History
- Opened: July 24, 2009
Location

Heukseok (Chung-Ang Univ.) Station is a station on Line 9 of the Seoul Subway.

Prior to its opening, Sangdo Station in Line 7's subname was also Chung-Ang, but Heukseok was near the Chung-Ang University. University Metro drivers and employees were conferenced, resulting in Sangdo Station's subname being removed. The subname 'Chung Ang Univ' is now in Heukseok.

== Station layout ==
G	Street level	Exit

L1; Concourse	Lobby	Customer Service, Shops, Vending machines, ATMs

L2; Platform level	Side platform, doors will open on the right
L2; Platform level	Westbound	← Line 9 Local toward Gaehwa (Nodeul) ← Line 9 Express does not stop here
L2; Platform level	Eastbound	Line 9 Local toward VHS Medical Center (Dongjak) → Line 9 Express does not stop here →
L2; Platform level	Side platform, doors will open on the right

== See also ==
- Sangdo Station
- Chung-Ang University

Preceding station	Seoul Metropolitan Subway	Following station
Nodeul towards Gaehwa	Line 9	Dongjak towards VHS Medical Center
