= Gayang station =

Railway station in Seoul, South Korea

가양 (부민병원); Gayang (Bumin Hospital)
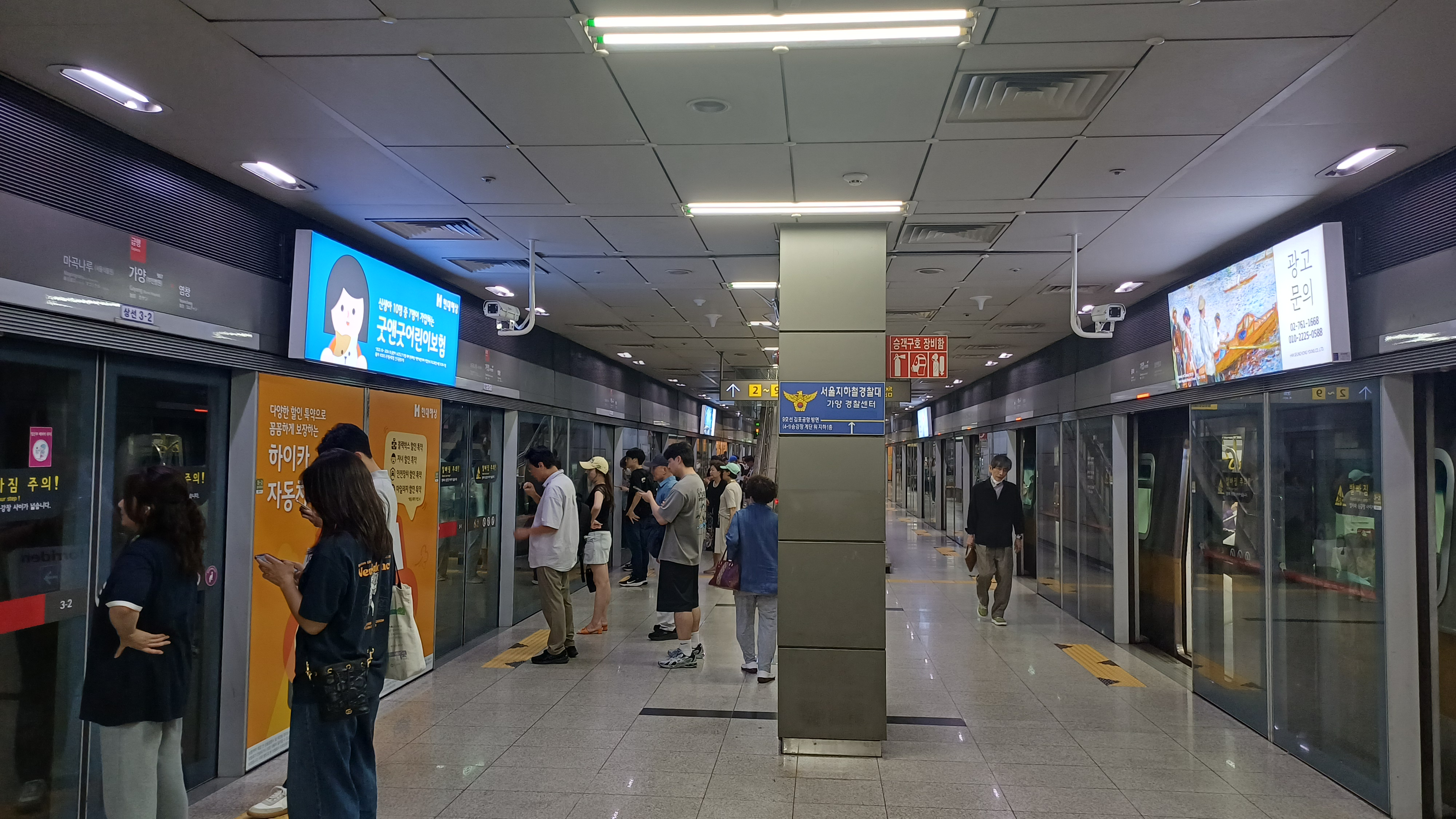
- Line 9 platforms

Korean name
- Hangul: 가양역
- Hanja: 加陽驛
- Revised Romanization: Gayangnyeok
- McCune–Reischauer: Kayangnyŏk

General information
- Location: 14-84 Gayang-dong; Gangseo-gu, Seoul
- Coordinates: 37°33′40″N 126°51′19″E
- Operator: Seoul Metro Line 9 Corporation
- Line: Line 9
- Platforms: 2 island platforms
- Tracks: 4

Construction
- Structure type: Underground

History
- Opened: July 24, 2009
Location

Gayang Station is a railway station on Line 9 of the Seoul Subway. It is located near Gayang Bridge.

== Station layout ==
G	Street level	Exit

L1; Concourse	Lobby	Customer Service, Shops, Vending machines, ATMs

L2; Platform level	Westbound local	← Line 9 Local toward Gaehwa (Yangcheon Hyanggyo)
L2; Platform level	Island platform, doors will open on the left, right
L2; Platform level	Westbound express	← Line 9 Express toward Gimpo Int'l Airport (Magongnaru)
L2; Platform level	Eastbound express	Line 9 Express toward VHS Medical Center (Yeomchang) →
L2; Platform level	Island platform, doors will open on the left, right
L2; Platform level	Eastbound local	Line 9 Local toward VHS Medical Center (Jeungmi) →

== Gallery ==
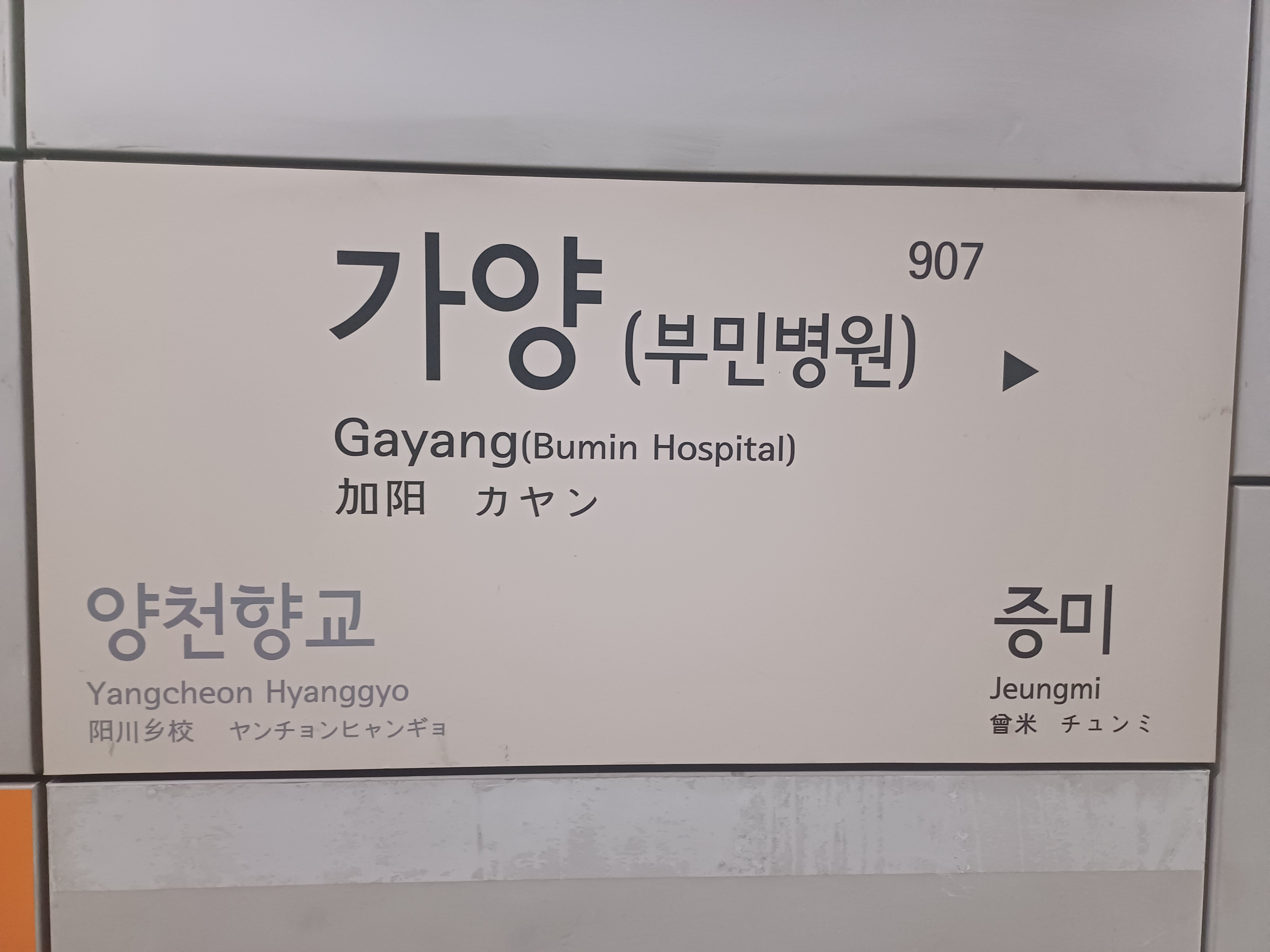
Line 9 station nameplate

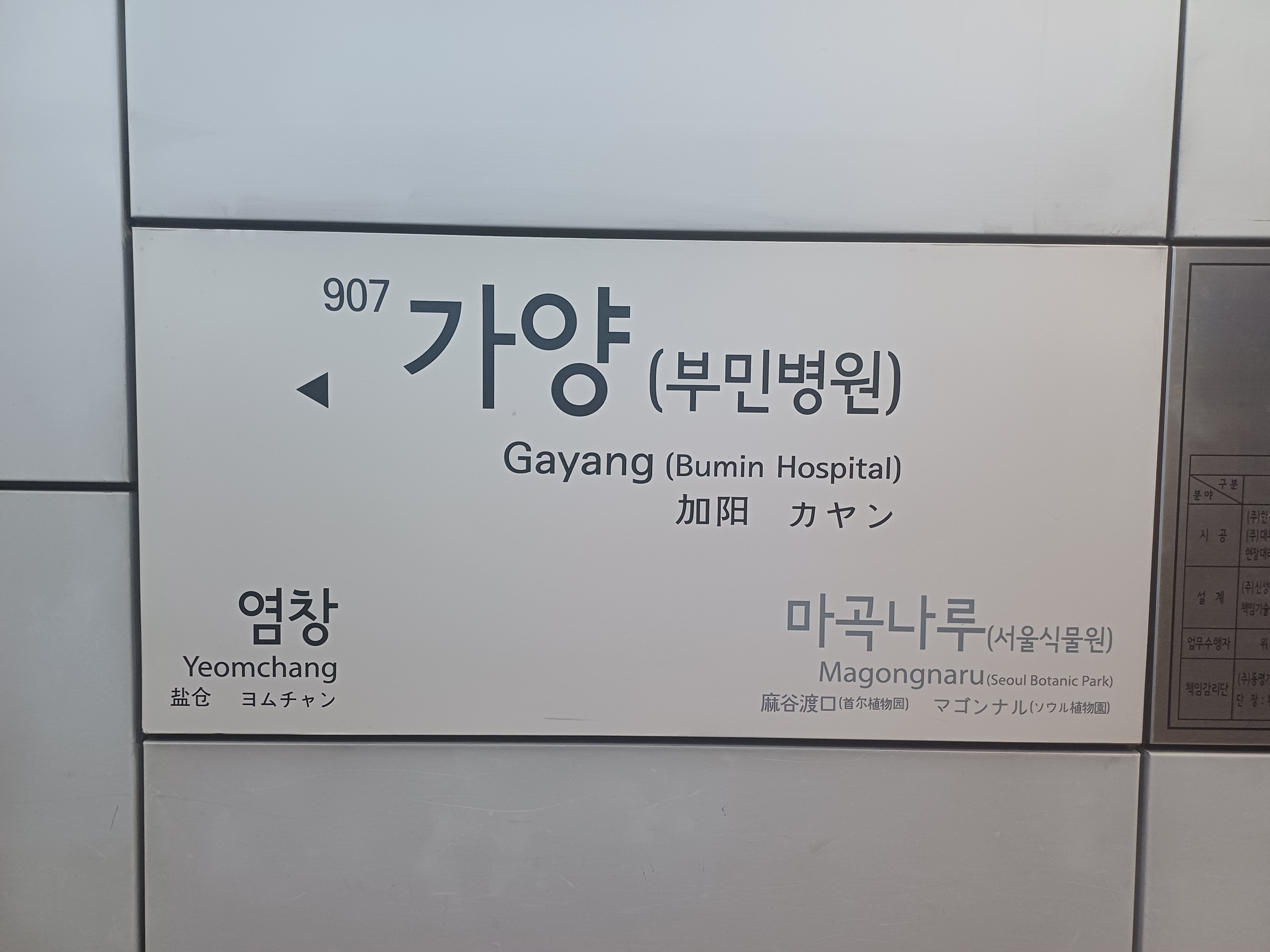
Line 9 Express station nameplate

Preceding station	Seoul Metropolitan Subway	Following station
Yangcheon Hyanggyo towards Gaehwa	Line 9	Jeungmi towards VHS Medical Center
Magongnaru towards Gimpo International Airport	Line 9 Express	Yeomchang towards VHS Medical Center
