= Sinbanghwa station =

Train station in South Korea

신방화; Sinbanghwa
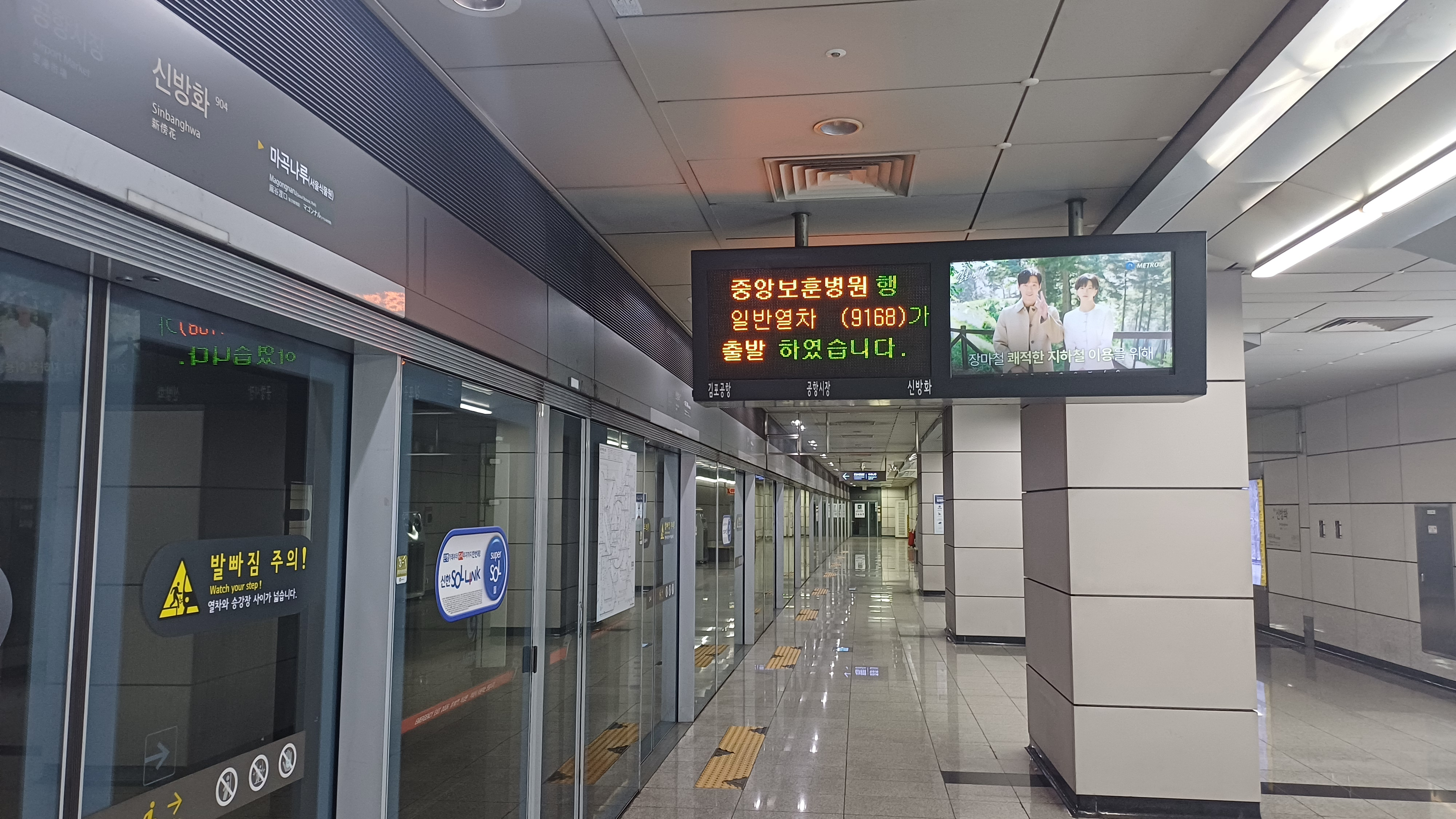
- Station platform

Korean name
- Hangul: 신방화역
- Hanja: 新傍花驛
- Revised Romanization: Sinbanghwa-yeok
- McCune–Reischauer: Sinbanghwa-yŏk

General information
- Location: 217-156 Banghwa-dong; Gangseo-gu, Seoul
- Coordinates: 37°34′03″N 126°49′00″E
- Operator: Seoul Metro Line 9 Corporation
- Line: Line 9
- Platforms: 2 side platforms
- Tracks: 2

Construction
- Structure type: Underground

History
- Opened: July 24, 2009
Location

Sinbanghwa Station is a railway station on Line 9 of the Seoul Subway.

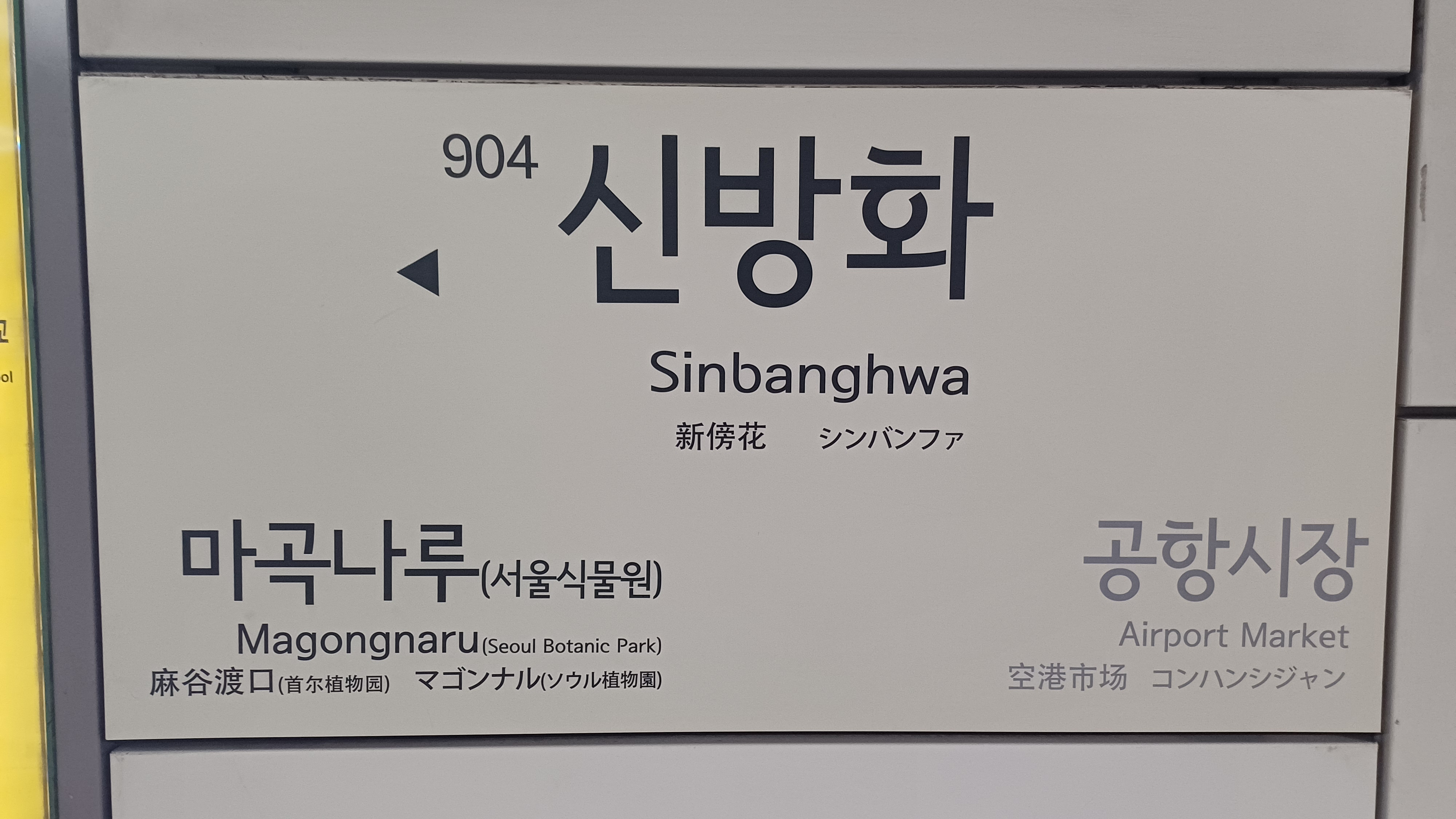
Station nameplate

== Station layout ==
G	Street level	Exit
L1; Concourse	Lobby	Customer Service, Shops, Vending machines, ATMs
L2; Platform level	Side platform, doors will open on the right
L2; Platform level	Westbound	← Line 9 Local toward Gaehwa (Airport Market) ← Line 9 Express does not stop here
L2; Platform level	Eastbound	Line 9 Local toward VHS Medical Center (Magongnaru) → Line 9 Express does not stop here →
L2; Platform level	Side platform, doors will open on the right

Preceding station	Seoul Metropolitan Subway	Following station
Airport Market towards Gaehwa	Line 9	Magongnaru towards VHS Medical Center
