= Airport Market station =

Station of the Seoul Metropolitan Subway

공항시장; Airport Market
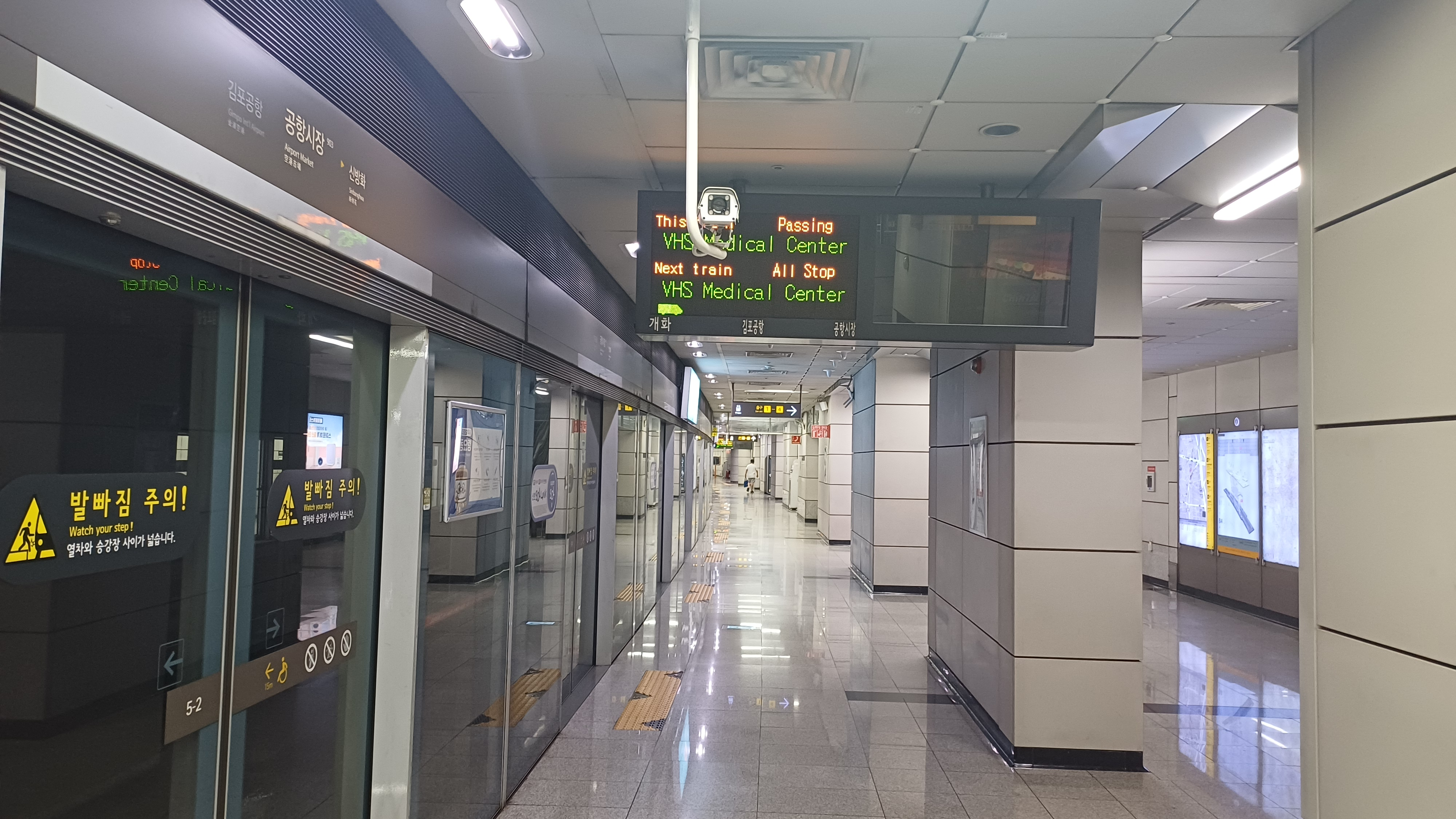
- Station platform

Korean name
- Hangul: 공항시장역
- Hanja: 空港市場驛
- RR: Gonghang sijang-yeok
- MR: Konghang sijang-yŏk

General information
- Location: 22-50 Gonghang-dong; Gangseo-gu, Seoul
- Coordinates: 37°33′49″N 126°48′37″E
- Operator: Seoul Metro Line 9 Corporation
- Line: Line 9
- Platforms: 2 side platforms
- Tracks: 2

Construction
- Structure type: Underground

History
- Opened: July 24, 2009

Services
Preceding station	Seoul Metropolitan Subway	Following station
Gimpo International Airport towards Gaehwa	Line 9	Sinbanghwa towards VHS Medical Center
Location

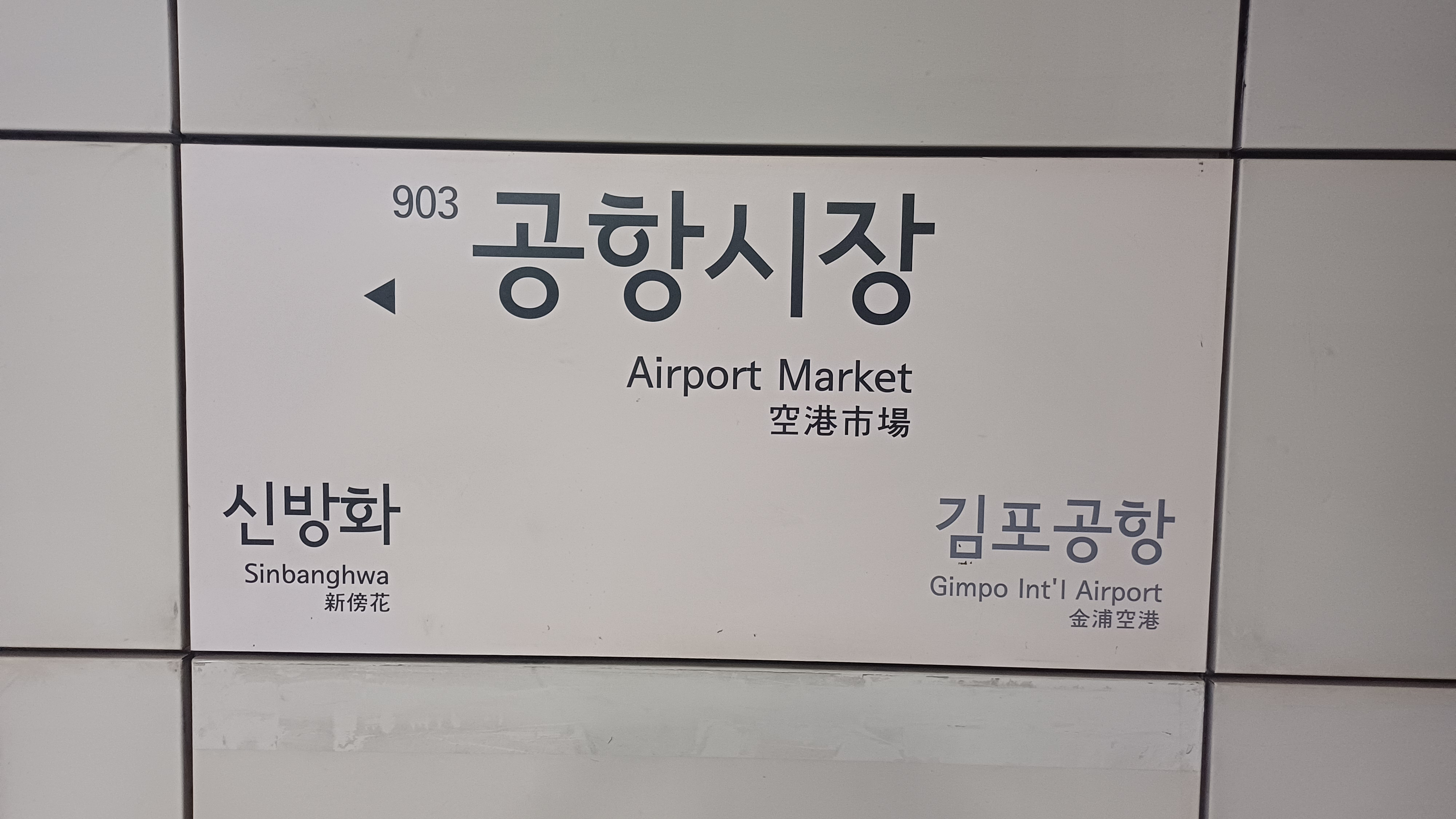
Station nameplate

Airport Market station (Korean: 공항시장역; Hanja: 空港市場驛) is a subway station on Line 9 of the Seoul Metropolitan Subway, located in Gonghang-dong, Gangseo District, Seoul. The station's name is derived from the nearby Airport Market, located in Gonghang-dong, in connection with nearby Gimpo International Airport. However, the nearby Airport Market is small in scale.

== History ==
- September 18, 2008: Station name decided as Airport Market Station.
- July 24, 2009: Operations began with the opening of Gaehwa-Sinnonhyeon section of Seoul Subway Line 9.

== Station layout ==
An underground station with a two-sided, two-track relative platform and screen doors.

G	Street level	Exit
L1; Concourse	Lobby	Customer Service, Shops, Vending machines, ATMs
L2; Platform level	Side platform, doors will open on the right
L2; Platform level	Westbound	← Line 9 Local toward Gaehwa (Gimpo International Airport) ← Line 9 Express does not stop here
L2; Platform level	Eastbound	Line 9 Local toward VHS Medical Center (Sinbanghwa) → Line 9 Express does not stop here →
L2; Platform level	Side platform, doors will open on the right

== Around the Station ==
- Airport Market
- Seoul Songjeong Elementary School
- Banghwa Middle School
- Seoul Subway Line 5, Songjeong Station direction
- Gangseo Sacred Heart Hospital
- Banghwa 2-dong Administrative Welfare Center

== Changes in Passenger Traffic ==
The 2009 data reflects only 161 days, from July 24, 2009, the opening date, to December 31, 2009.

Route		Average daily passenger traffic (people/day)											References
Route		2009	2010	2011	2012	2013	2014	2015	2016	2017	2018	2019	References
Line 9	Boarding	1,944	2,258	2,634	2,946	3,090	3,140	3,047	2,954	2,915			
Line 9	Drop off	1,988	2,331	2,789	3,178	3,411	3,496	3,370	3,302	3,279			
