= Yeomchang station =

Station of the Seoul Metropolitan Subway

염창; Yeomchang
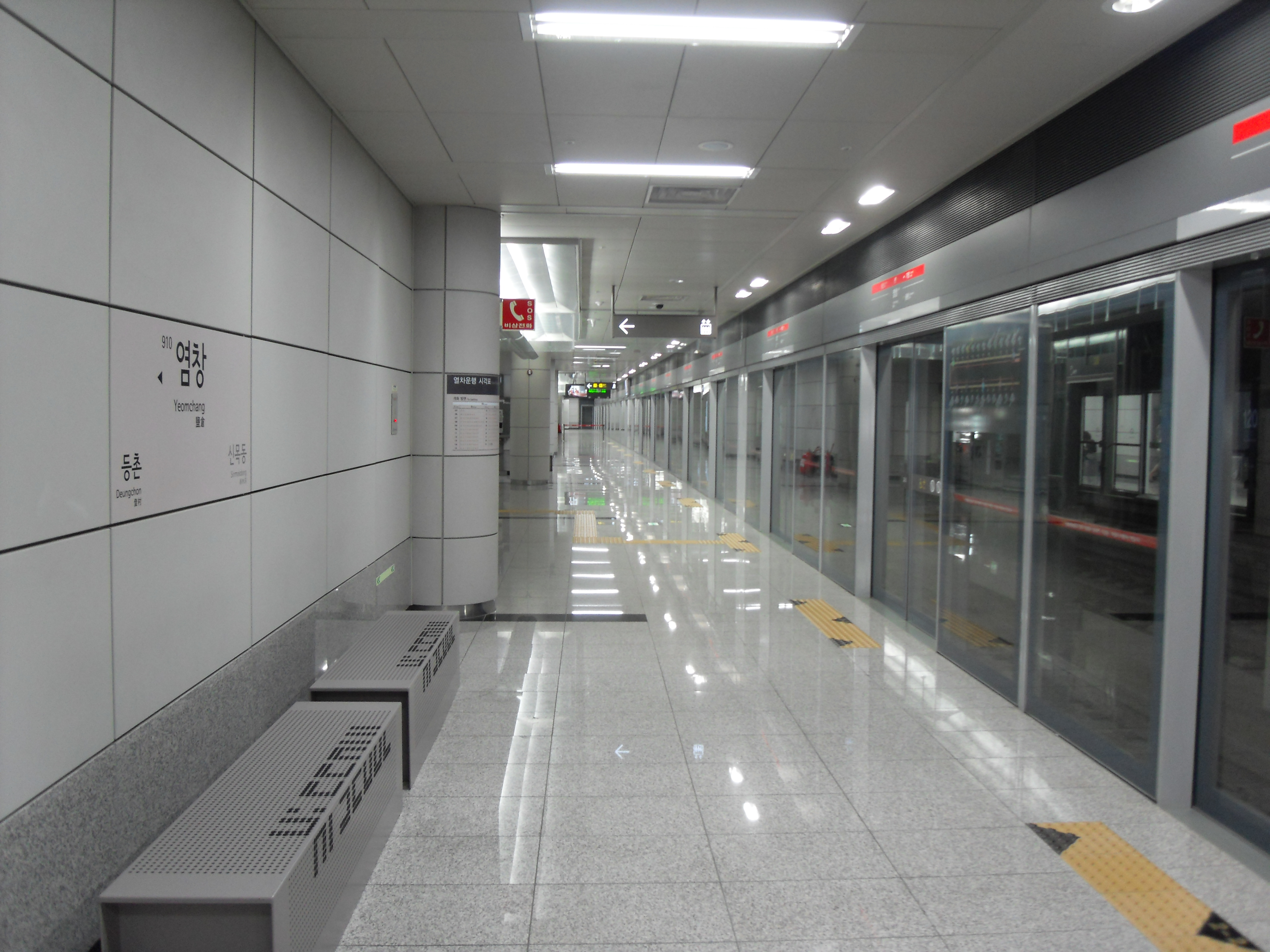

Korean name
- Hangul: 염창역
- Hanja: 鹽倉驛
- Revised Romanization: Yeomchangnyeok
- McCune–Reischauer: Yŏmch'angnyŏk

General information
- Location: 282-22 Yeomchang-dong; Gangseo-gu, Seoul
- Coordinates: 37°32′49″N 126°52′29″E
- Operator: Seoul Metro Line 9 Corporation
- Line: Line 9
- Platforms: 2 side platforms
- Tracks: 2
- Bus routes: 6000 6001 6008

Construction
- Structure type: Underground

History
- Opened: July 24, 2009
Location

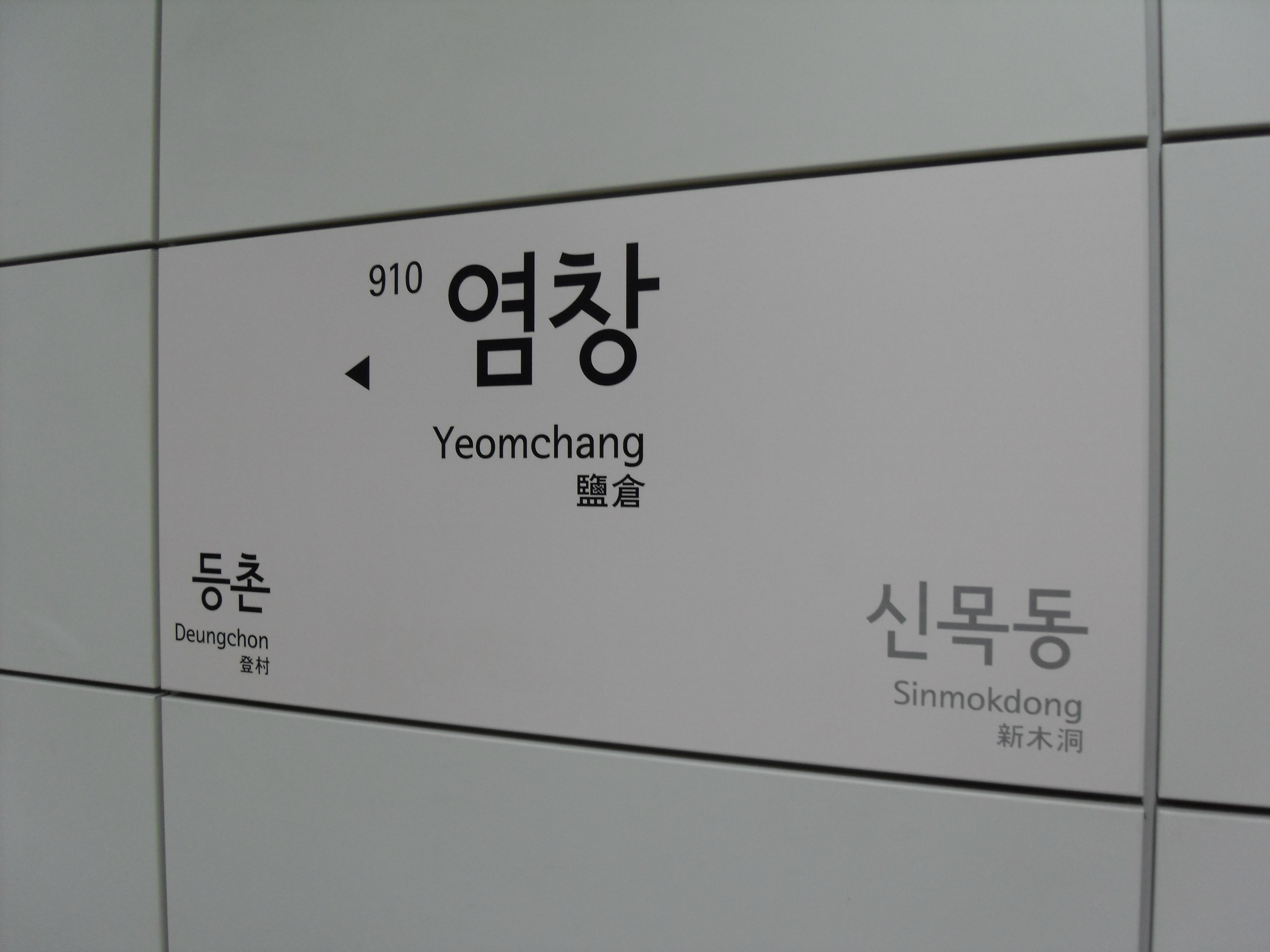
Station nameplate

Yeomchang is a railway station on Line 9 of the Seoul Subway.

== Station layout ==
G	Street level	Exit

L1; Concourse	Lobby	Customer Service, Shops, Vending machines, ATMs

L2; Platform level	Side platform, doors will open on the right
L2; Platform level	Westbound	← Line 9 Local toward Gaehwa (Deungchon) ← Line 9 Express toward Gimpo Int'l Airport (Gayang)
L2; Platform level	Eastbound	Line 9 Local toward VHS Medical Center (Sinmokdong) → Line 9 Express toward VHS Medical Center (Dangsan) →
L2; Platform level	Side platform, doors will open on the right

Preceding station	Seoul Metropolitan Subway	Following station
Deungchon towards Gaehwa	Line 9	Sinmokdong towards VHS Medical Center
Gayang towards Gimpo International Airport	Line 9 Express	Dangsan towards VHS Medical Center
