= Jeungmi station =

Train station in South Korea

Coordinates: 37.55751°N 126.86168°E

증미 (서울고든병원); Jeungmi (Seoul Gorden Hospital)
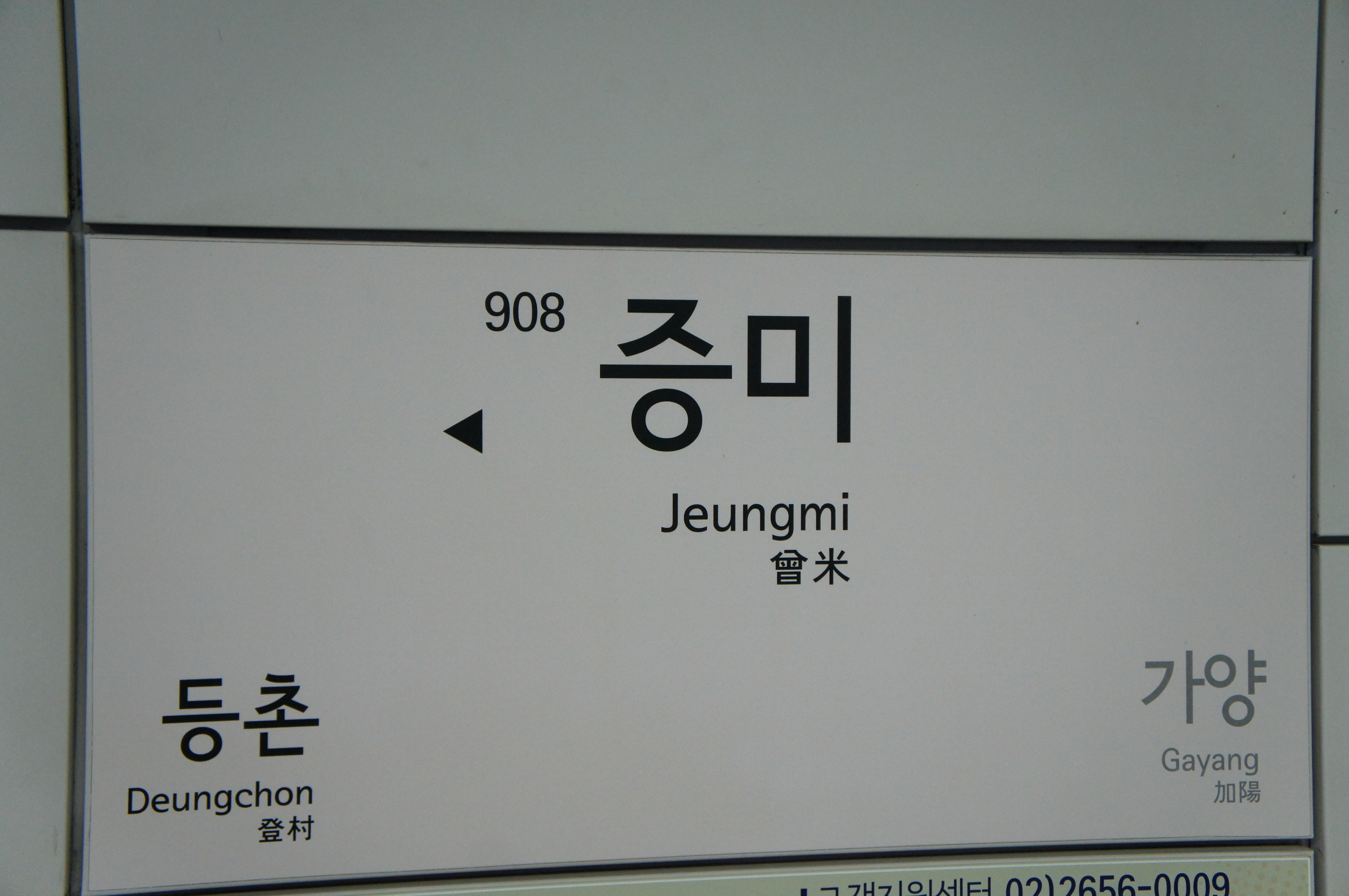

Korean name
- Hangul: 증미역
- Hanja: 曾米驛
- Revised Romanization: Jeungmi-yeok
- McCune–Reischauer: Chŭngmi-yŏk

General information
- Location: 630-2 Deungchon-dong; Gangseo-gu, Seoul
- Operator: Seoul Metro Line 9 Corporation
- Line: Line 9
- Platforms: 2 side platforms
- Tracks: 2

Construction
- Structure type: Underground

History
- Opened: July 24, 2009
Location

Jeungmi Station is a railway station on Line 9 of the Seoul Subway.

== Station layout ==
G	Street level	Exit

L1; Concourse	Lobby	Customer Service, Shops, Vending machines, ATMs

L2; Platform level	Side platform, doors will open on the right
L2; Platform level	Westbound	← Line 9 Local toward Gaehwa (Gayang) ← Line 9 Express does not stop here
L2; Platform level	Eastbound	Line 9 Local toward VHS Medical Center (Deungchon) → Line 9 Express does not stop here →
L2; Platform level	Side platform, doors will open on the right

Preceding station	Seoul Metropolitan Subway	Following station
Gayang towards Gaehwa	Line 9	Deungchon towards VHS Medical Center
