= Deungchon station =

Metro station in Seoul, South Korea

Coordinates: 37°33′04″N 126°51′53″E

등촌 (강서대학교); Deungchon (Gangseo University)
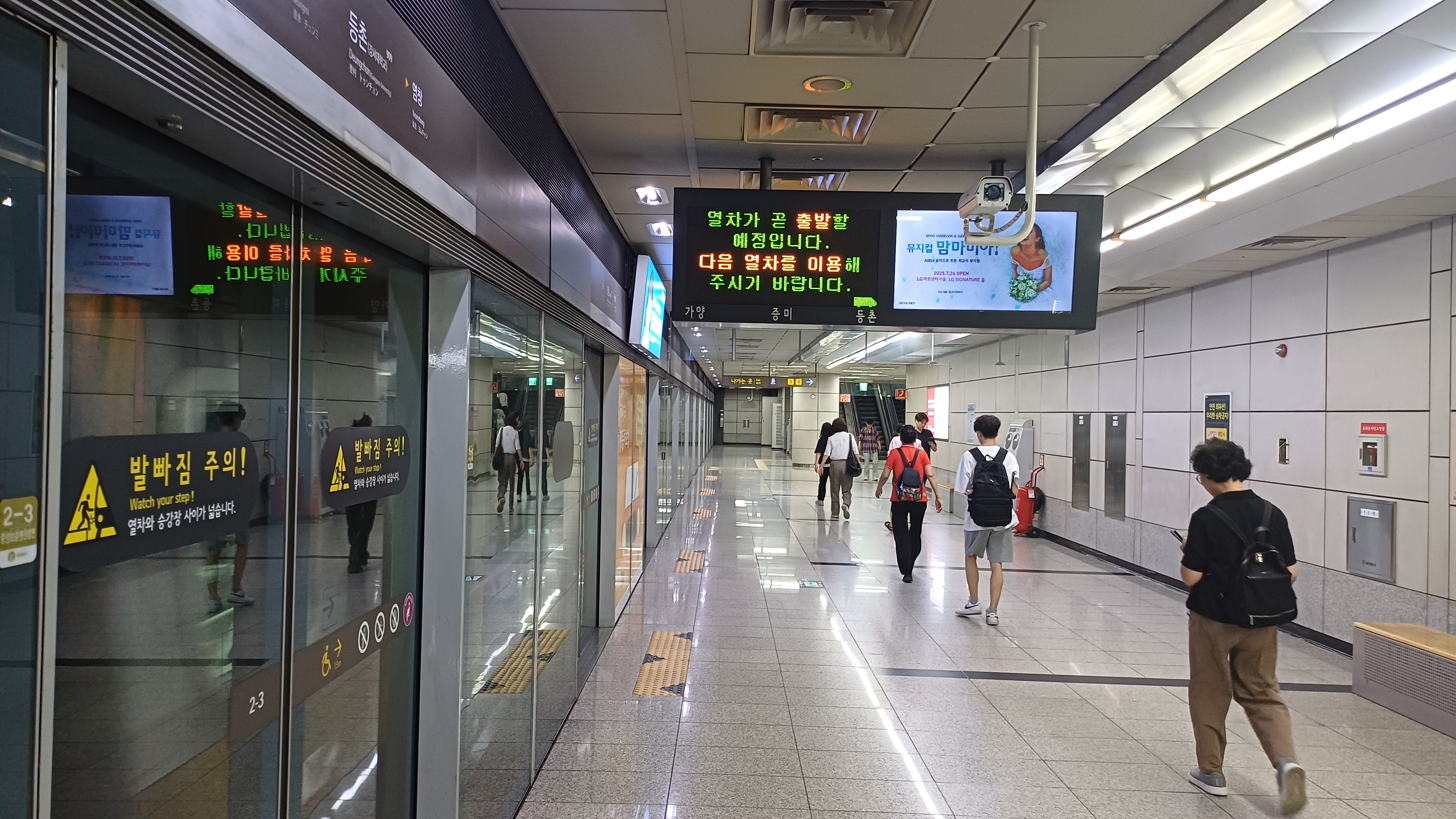
- Station platform

Korean name
- Hangul: 등촌역
- Hanja: 登村驛
- Revised Romanization: Deungchon-yeok
- McCune–Reischauer: Tŭngch'on-yŏk

General information
- Location: 648-9 Deungchon-dong; Gangseo-gu, Seoul
- Operator: Seoul Metro Line 9 Corporation
- Line: Line 9
- Platforms: 2 side platforms
- Tracks: 2
- Bus routes: 6000 6001 6008

Construction
- Structure type: Underground

History
- Opened: July 24, 2009
Location

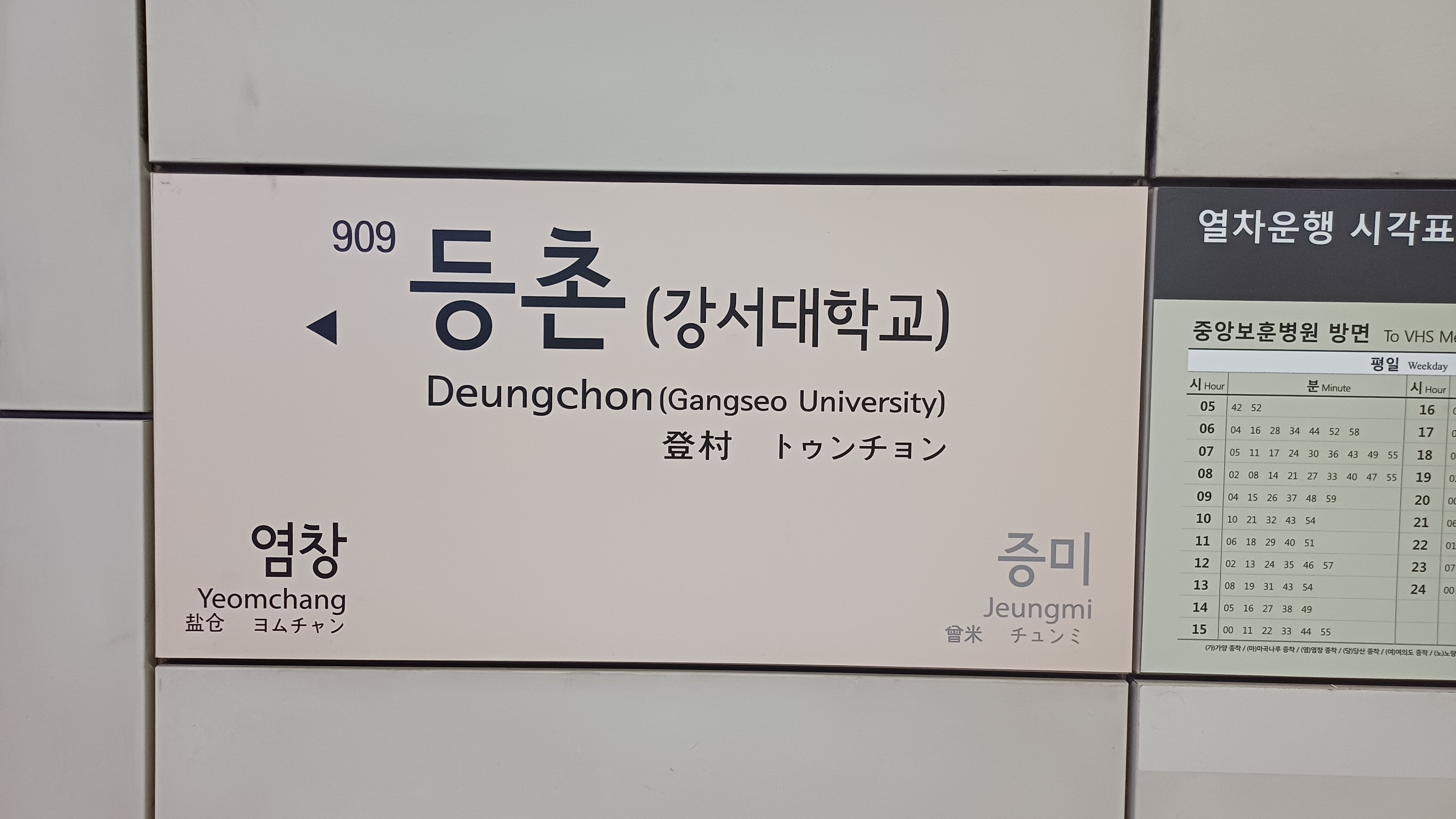
Station nameplate

Deungchon (Korean: 등촌역) is a railway station on Line 9 of the Seoul Subway.

== Station layout ==
G	Street level	Exit

L1; Concourse	Lobby	Customer Service, Shops, Vending machines, ATMs

L2; Platform level	Side platform, doors will open on the right
L2; Platform level	Westbound	← Line 9 Local toward Gaehwa (Jeungmi) ← Line 9 Express does not stop here
L2; Platform level	Eastbound	Line 9 Local toward VHS Medical Center (Yeomchang) → Line 9 Express does not stop here →
L2; Platform level	Side platform, doors will open on the right

Preceding station	Seoul Metropolitan Subway	Following station
Jeungmi towards Gaehwa	Line 9	Yeomchang towards VHS Medical Center
