= Magongnaru station =

Train station in South Korea

마곡나루 (서울식물원); Magongnaru (Seoul Botanic Park)
마곡나루; Magongnaru
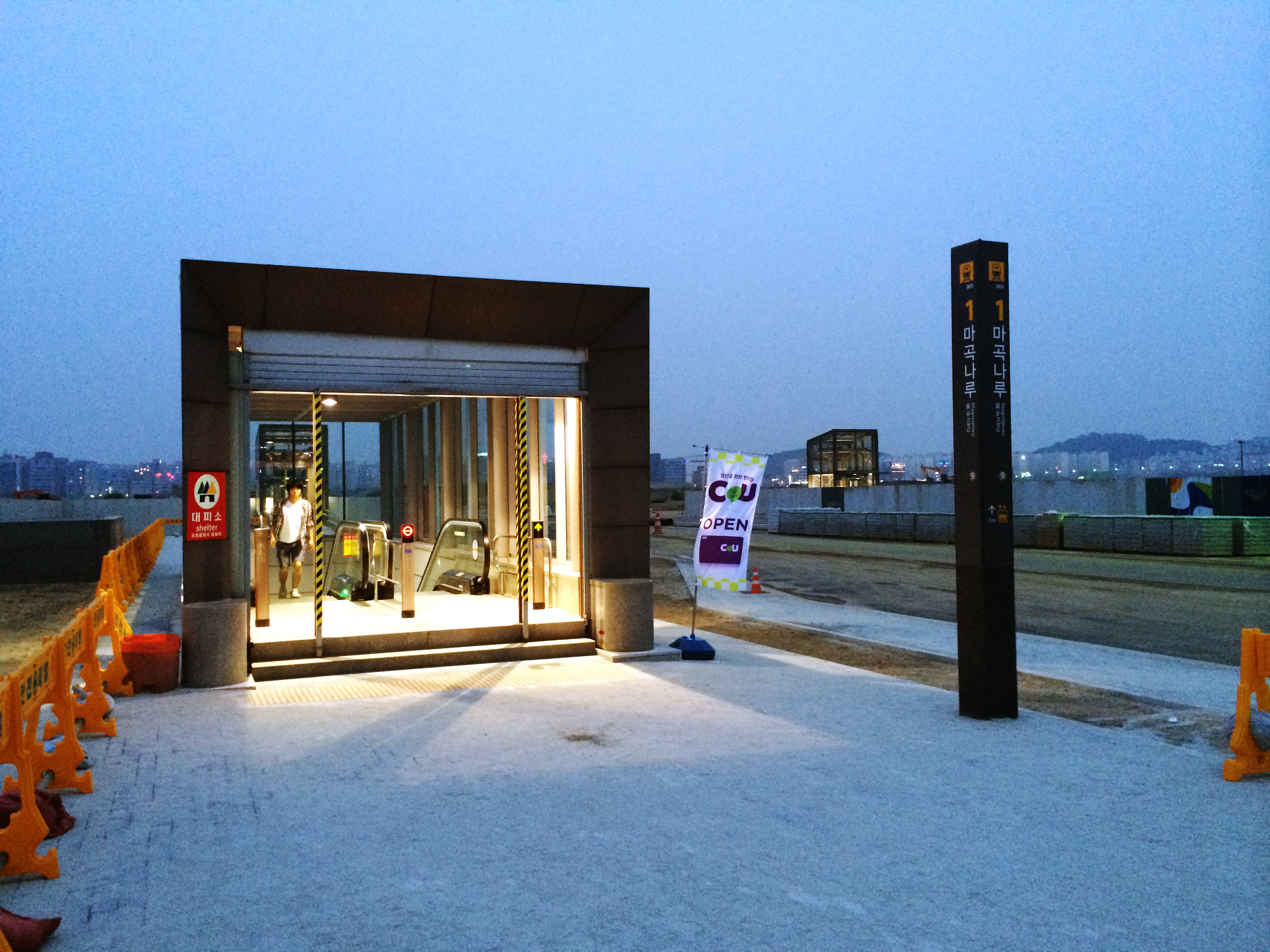

Korean name
- Hangul: 마곡나루역
- Hanja: 麻谷나루驛
- Revised Romanization: Magongnaru-yeok
- McCune–Reischauer: Magongnaru-yŏk

General information
- Location: Magok-dong, Gangseo-gu, Seoul
- Coordinates: 37°34′02″N 126°49′46″E
- Operator: Seoul Metro Line 9 Corporation; Airport Railroad Co., Ltd.
- Lines: Line 9 AREX
- Platforms: 4 (2 island platforms, 2 side platforms)
- Tracks: 6

Construction
- Structure type: Underground
- Accessible: Yes

Key dates
- May 24, 2014: Line 9 opened
- September 29, 2018: AREX opened
Services
Preceding station	Seoul Metropolitan Subway	Following station
Sinbanghwa towards Gaehwa	Line 9	Yangcheon Hyanggyo towards VHS Medical Center
Gimpo International Airport Terminus	Line 9 Express	Gayang towards VHS Medical Center
Digital Media City towards Seoul Station	AREX	Gimpo International Airport towards Incheon Int'l Airport Terminal 2
Location

Magongnaru Station is a railway station on Seoul Subway Line 9 and AREX. It was opened later than other stations on both lines because of the lack of development in the surrounding area.

== Station layout ==
2F; Platform level	Side platform, doors will open on the left, right
2F; Platform level	Eastbound	AREX Local toward Seoul (Digital Media City) → AREX Express does not stop here →
2F; Platform level	Westbound	← AREX Local toward Incheon International Airport Terminal 2 (Gimpo Int'l Airport) ← AREX Express does not stop here
2F; Platform level	Side platform, doors will open on the left, right
1F; Concourse	Lobby	Customer Service, Shops, Vending machines, ATMs
G	Street level	Exit
B1; Concourse	Lobby	Customer Service, Shops, Vending machines, ATMs
B2; Platform level	Westbound local	← Line 9 Local toward Gaehwa (Sinbanghwa)
B2; Platform level	Island platform, doors will open on the left, right
B2; Platform level	Westbound express	← Line 9 Express toward Gimpo Int'l Airport (Terminus)
B2; Platform level	Eastbound express	Line 9 Express toward VHS Medical Center (Gayang) →
B2; Platform level	Island platform, doors will open on the left, right
B2; Platform level	Eastbound local	Line 9 Local toward VHS Medical Center (Yangcheon Hyanggyo) →

== Gallery ==
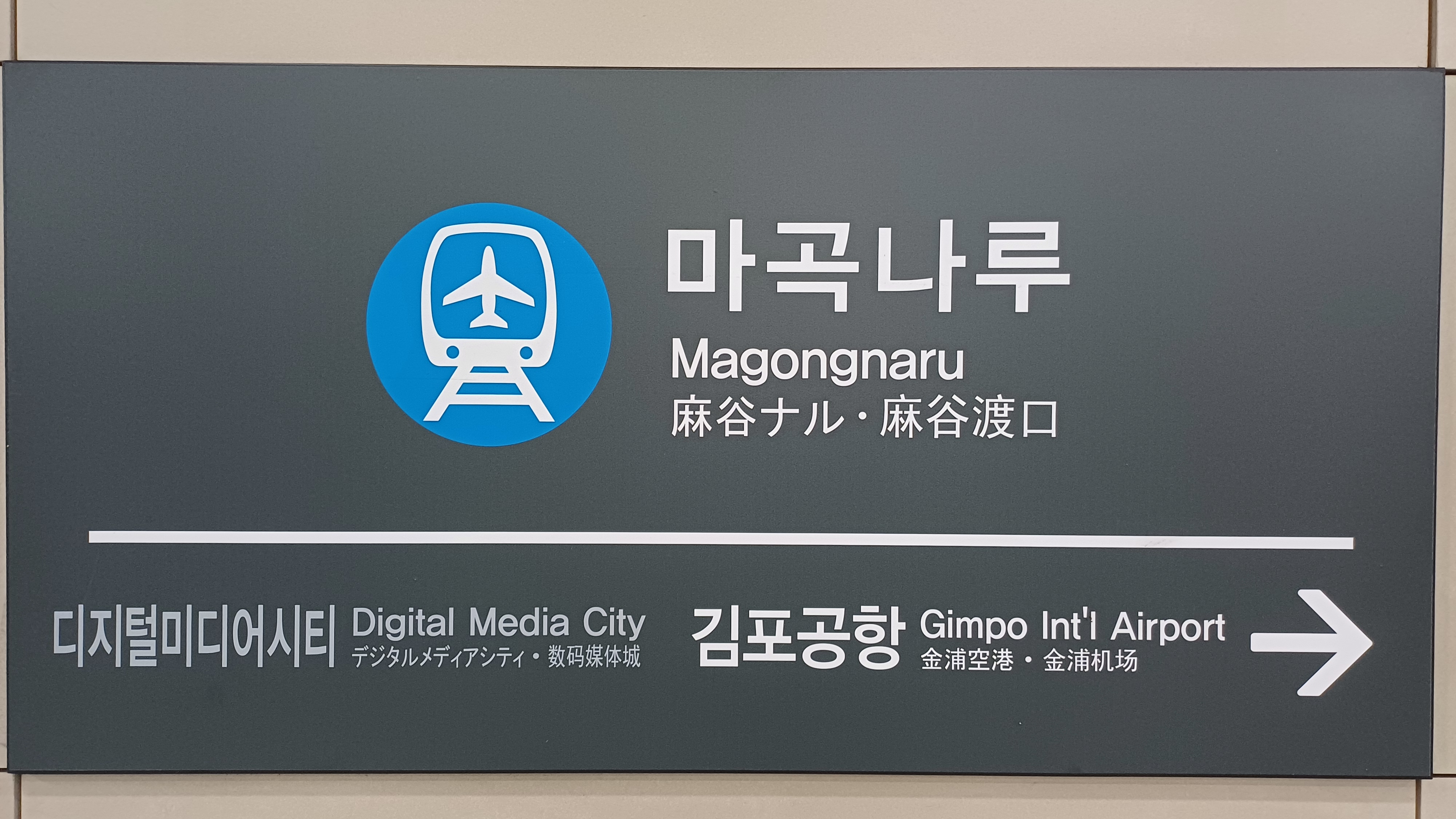
Station Sign (AREX)

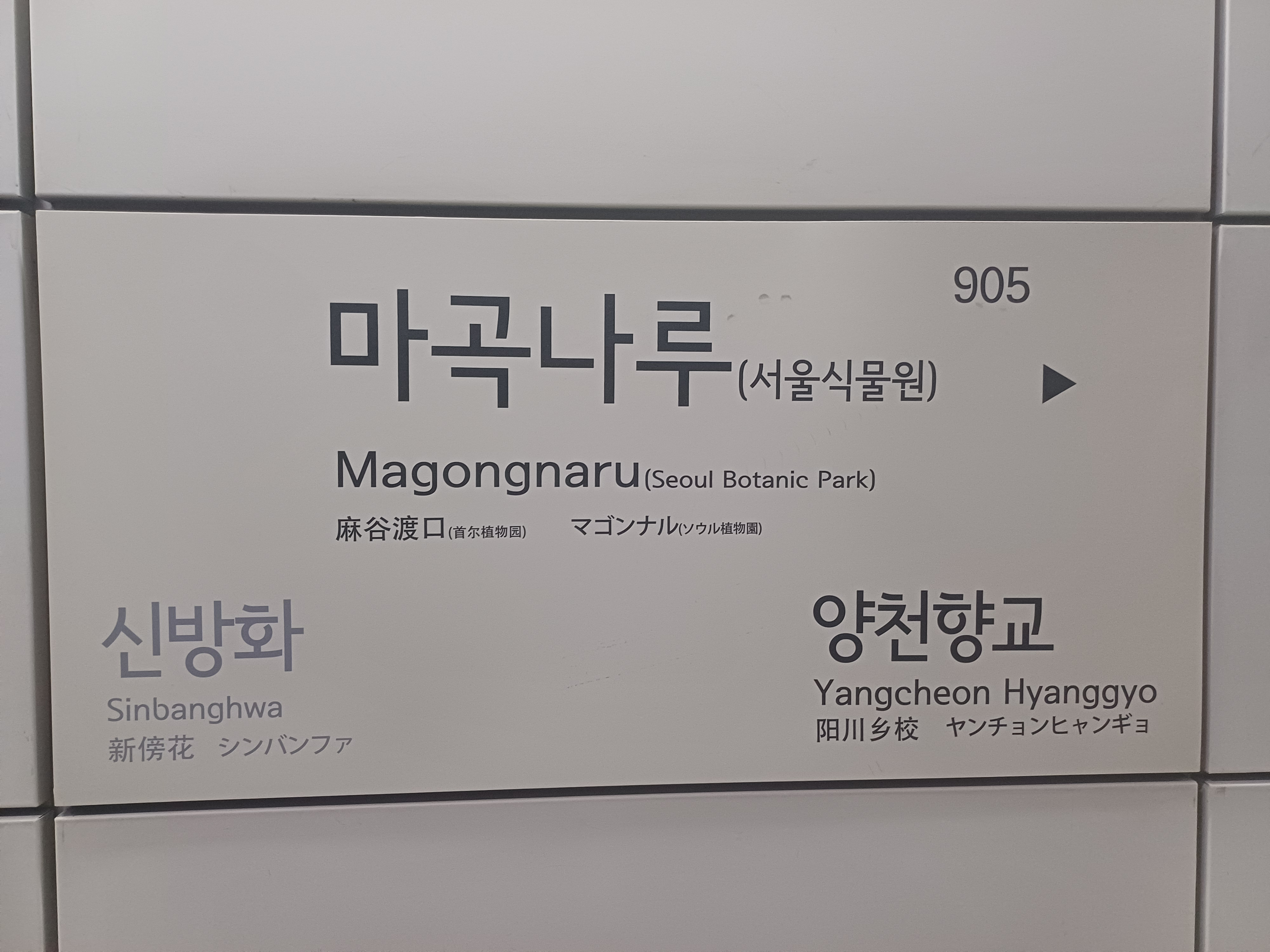
Station Sign (Line 9)

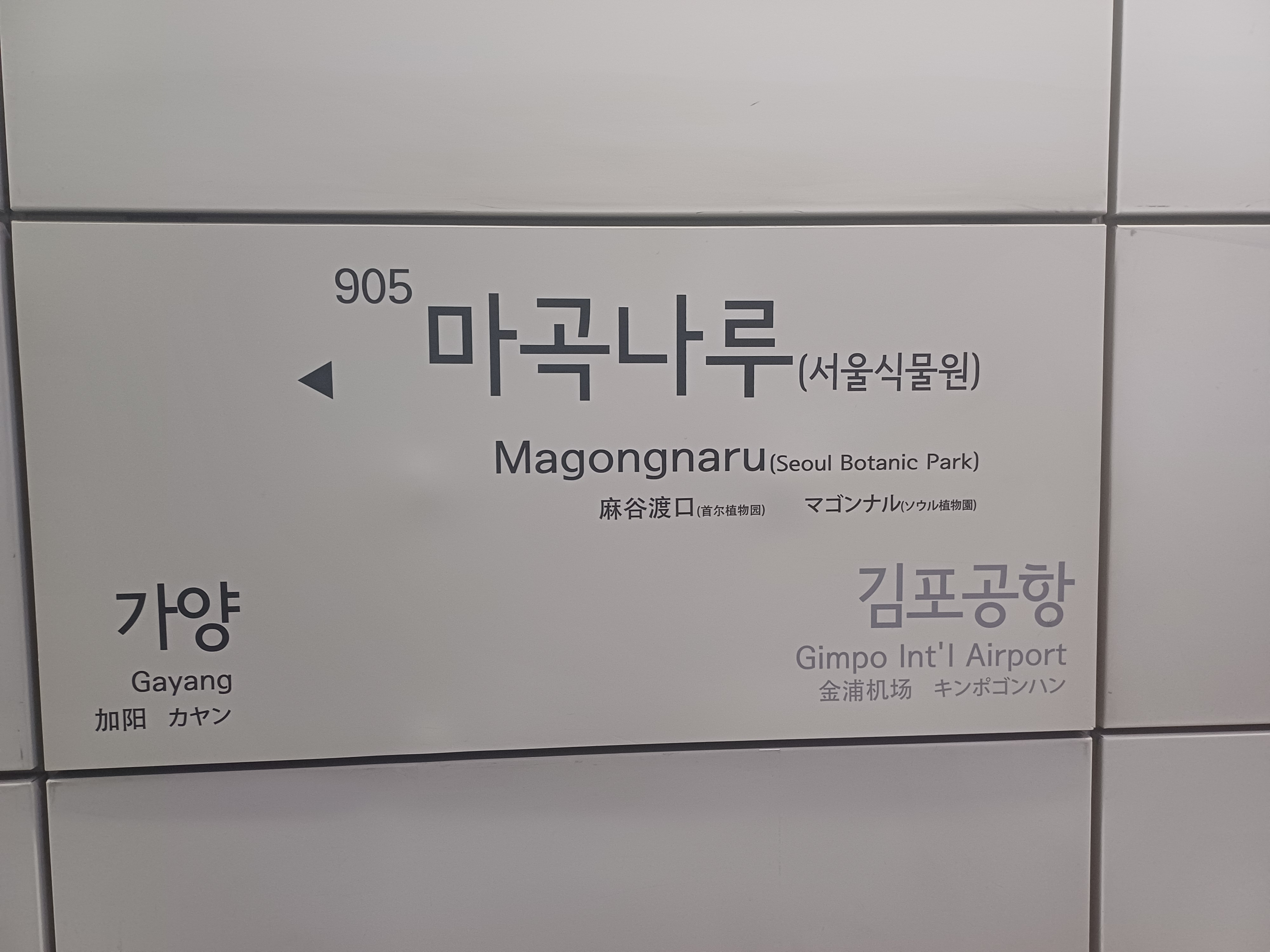
Station Sign (Line 9 Express)

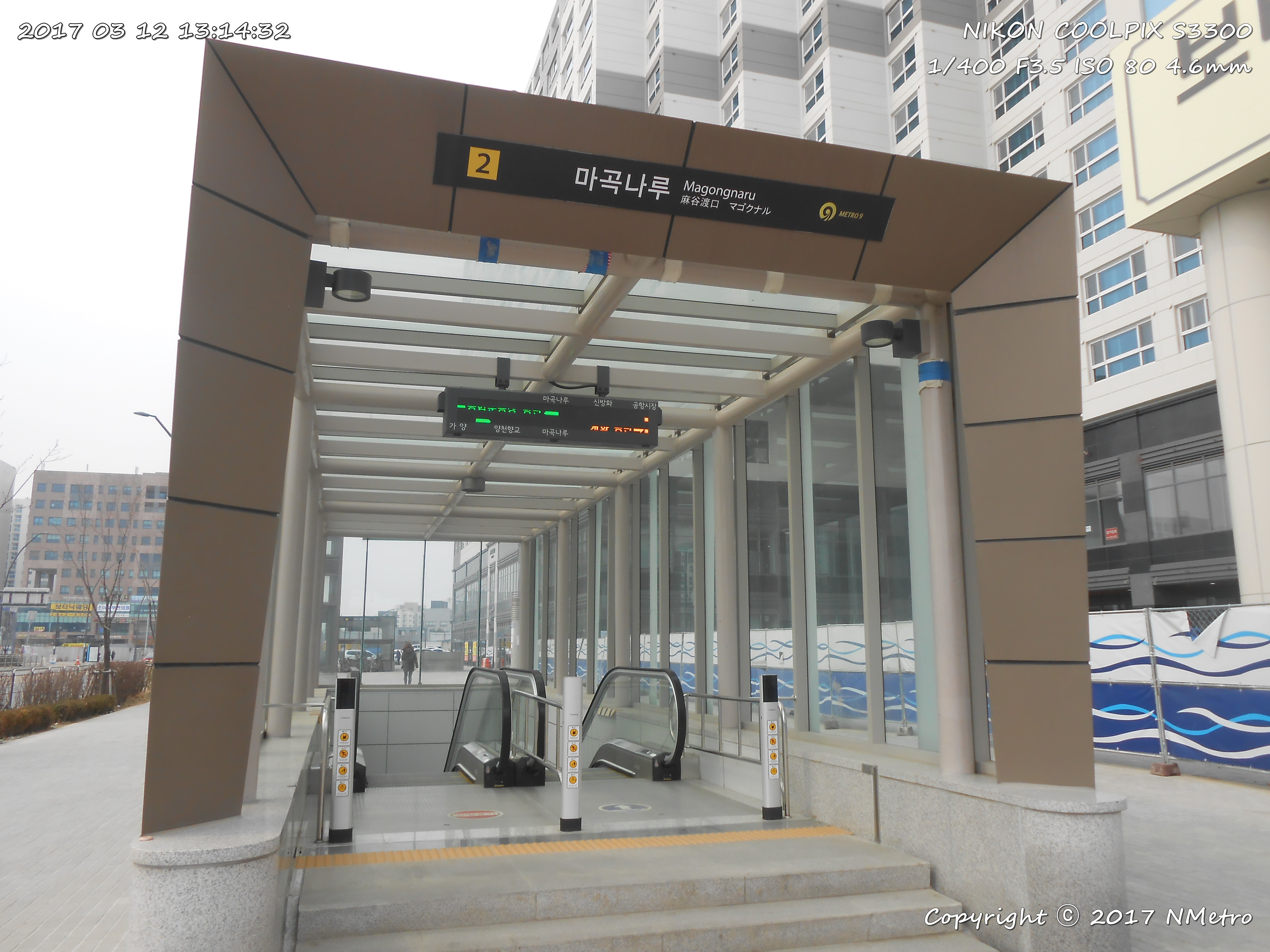
Magongnaru station exit no. 2

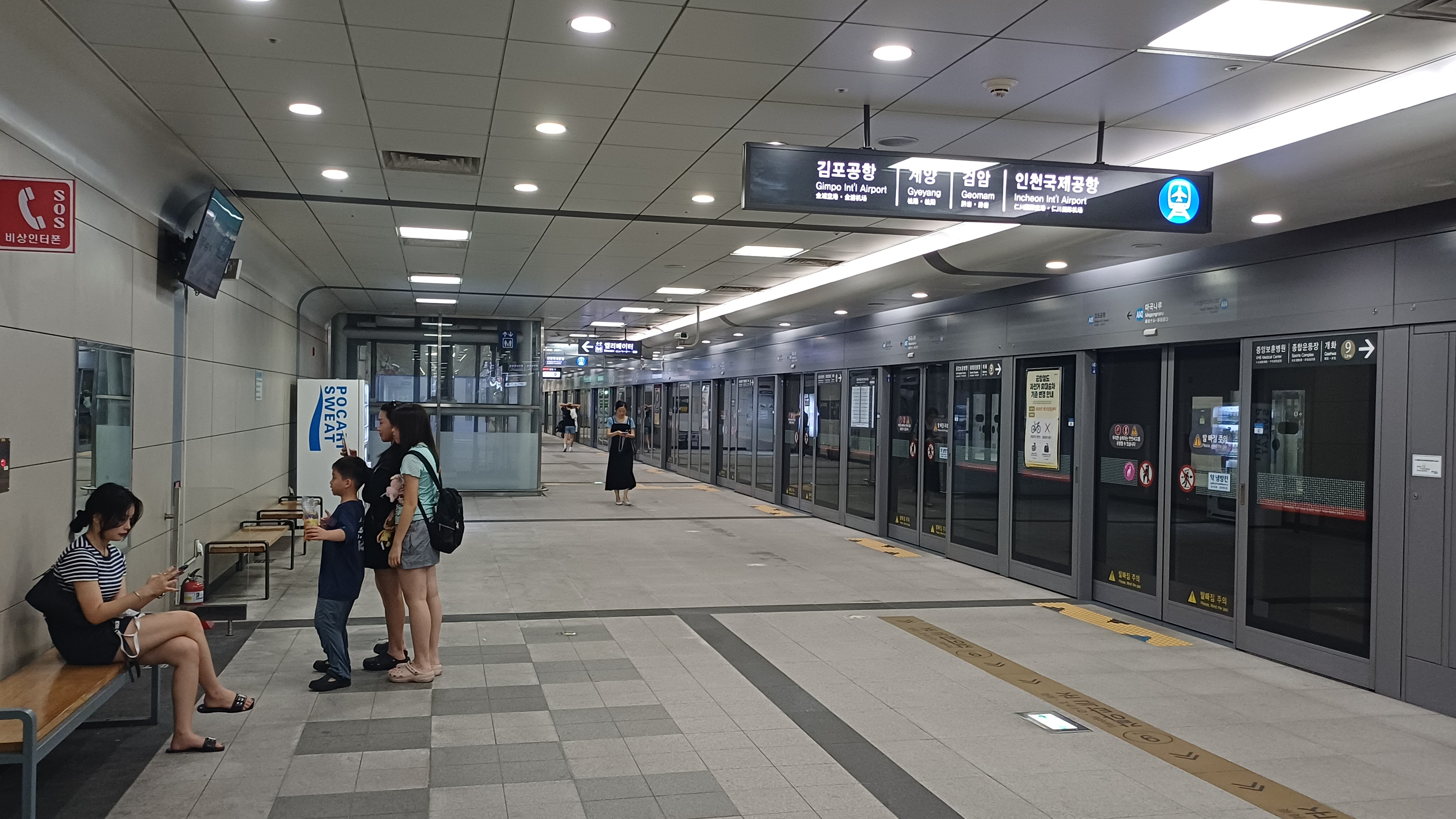
Platform (AREX)

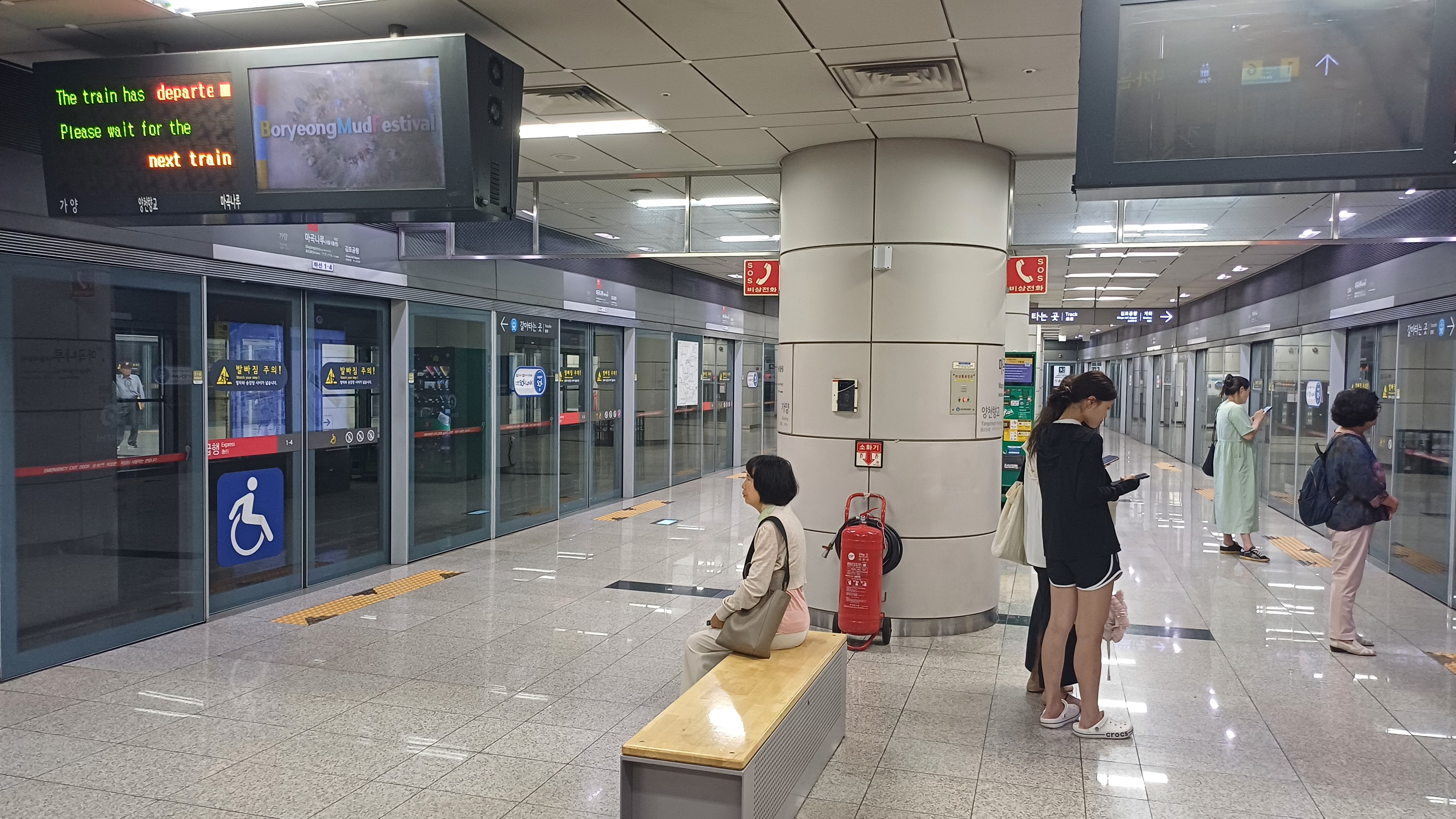
Platform (Line 9)
