= Yangcheon Hyanggyo station =

Station of the Seoul Metropolitan Subway

양천향교; Yangcheon Hyanggyo
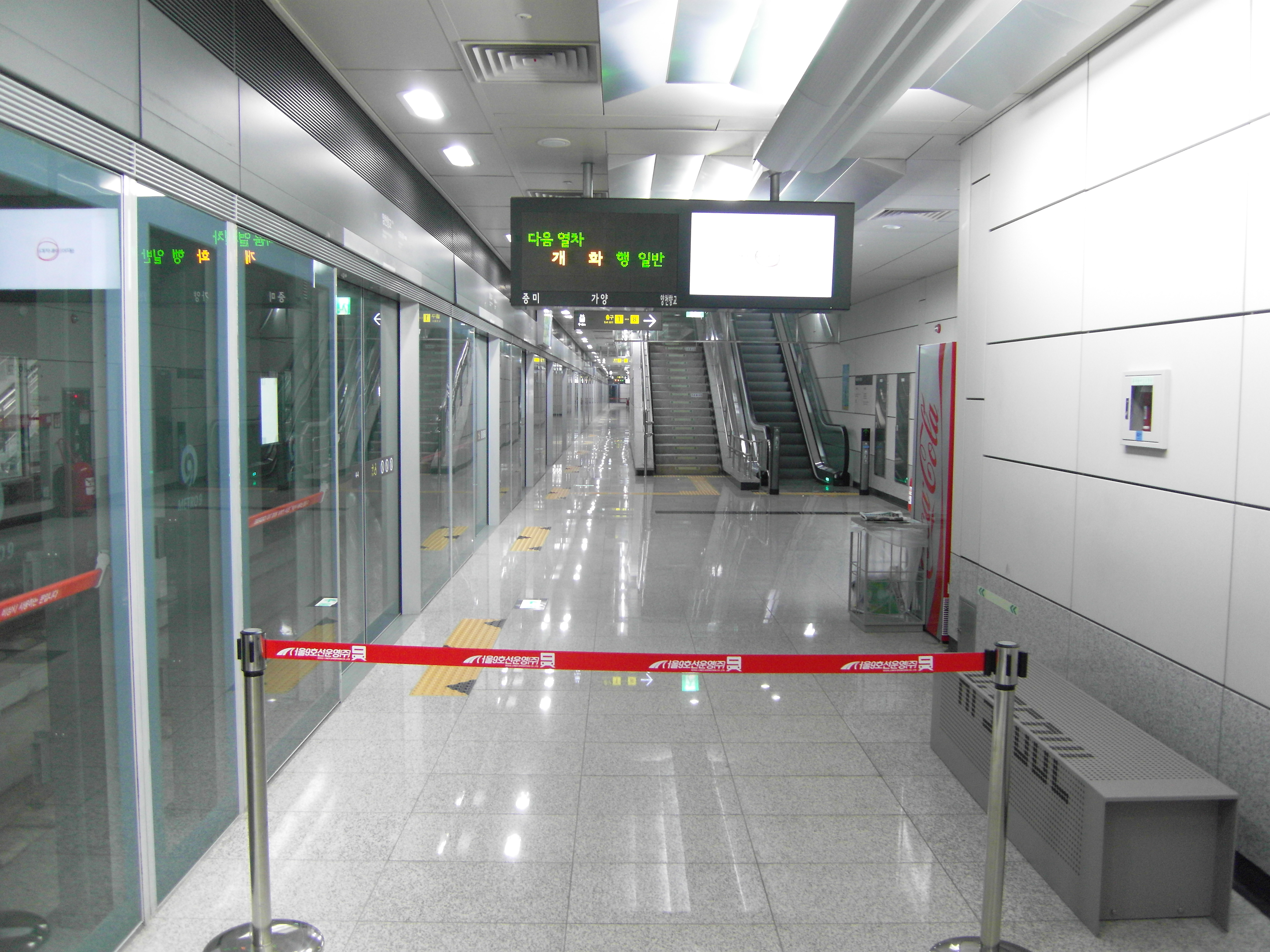

Korean name
- Hangul: 양천향교역
- Hanja: 陽川鄕校驛
- Revised Romanization: Yangcheonhyanggyo-yeok
- McCune–Reischauer: Yangch'ŏnhyanggyo-yŏk

General information
- Location: 150-34 Gayang-dong; Gangseo-gu, Seoul
- Coordinates: 37°34′06″N 126°50′29″E
- Operator: Seoul Metro Line 9 Corporation
- Line: Line 9
- Platforms: 2 side platforms
- Tracks: 2

Construction
- Structure type: Underground

History
- Opened: July 24, 2009

Services
Preceding station	Seoul Metropolitan Subway	Following station
Magongnaru towards Gaehwa	Line 9	Gayang towards VHS Medical Center
Location

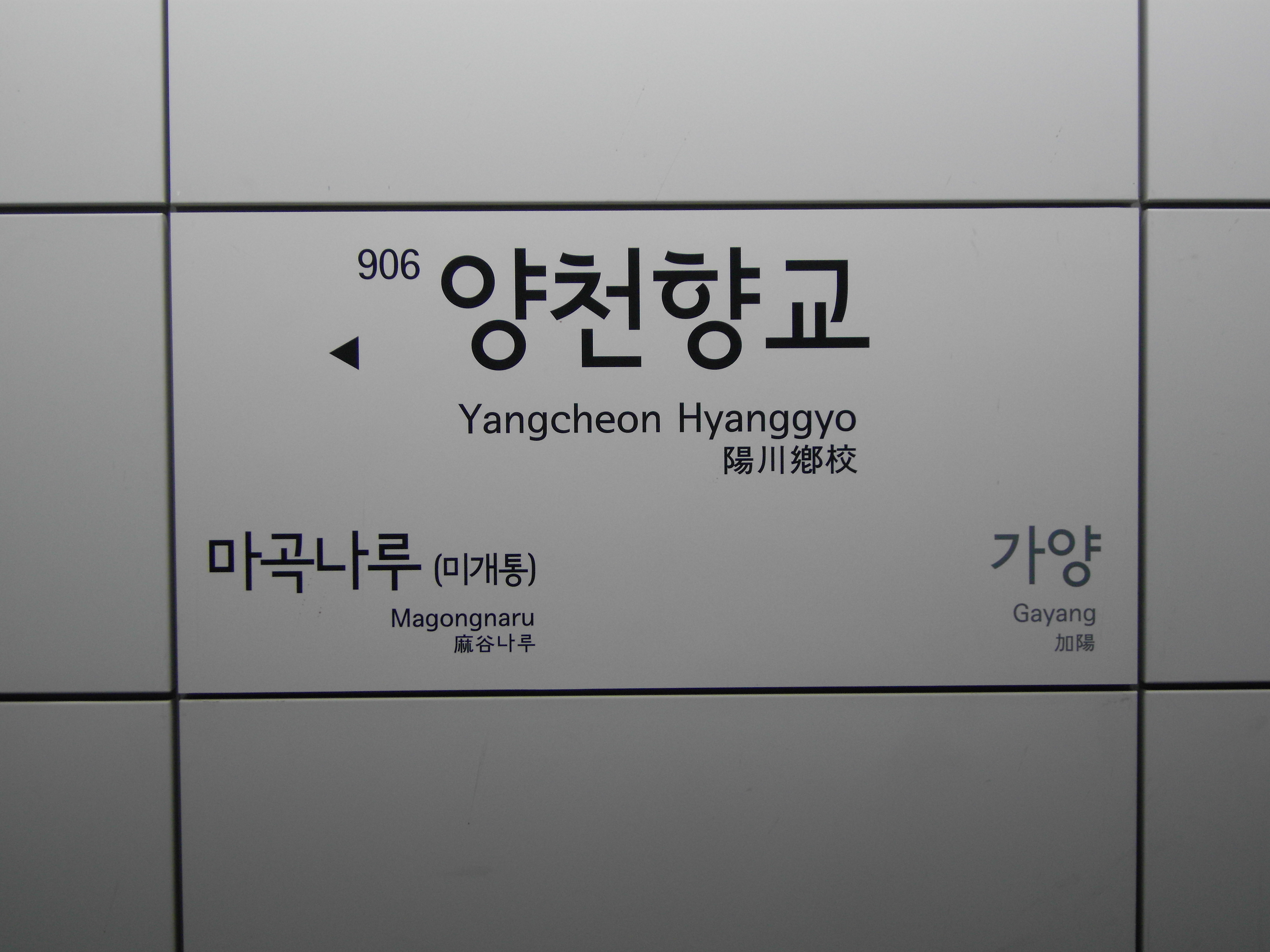
Station nameplate

Yangcheon Hyanggyo Station is a railway station on Line 9 of the Seoul Subway.

This station is named from near this station, Yangcheon Hyanggyo, the only hyanggyo in Seoul.

== Station layout ==
G	Street level	Exit
L1; Concourse	Lobby	Customer Service, Shops, Vending machines, ATMs
L2; Platform level	Side platform, doors will open on the right
L2; Platform level	Westbound	← Line 9 Local toward Gaehwa (Magongnaru) ← Line 9 Express does not stop here
L2; Platform level	Eastbound	Line 9 Local toward VHS Medical Center (Gayang) → Line 9 Express does not stop here →
L2; Platform level	Side platform, doors will open on the right
