= Dunchon Oryun station =

Metro station in Seoul, South Korea

Coordinates: 37.5198°N 127.1384°E

둔촌오륜; Dunchon Oryun
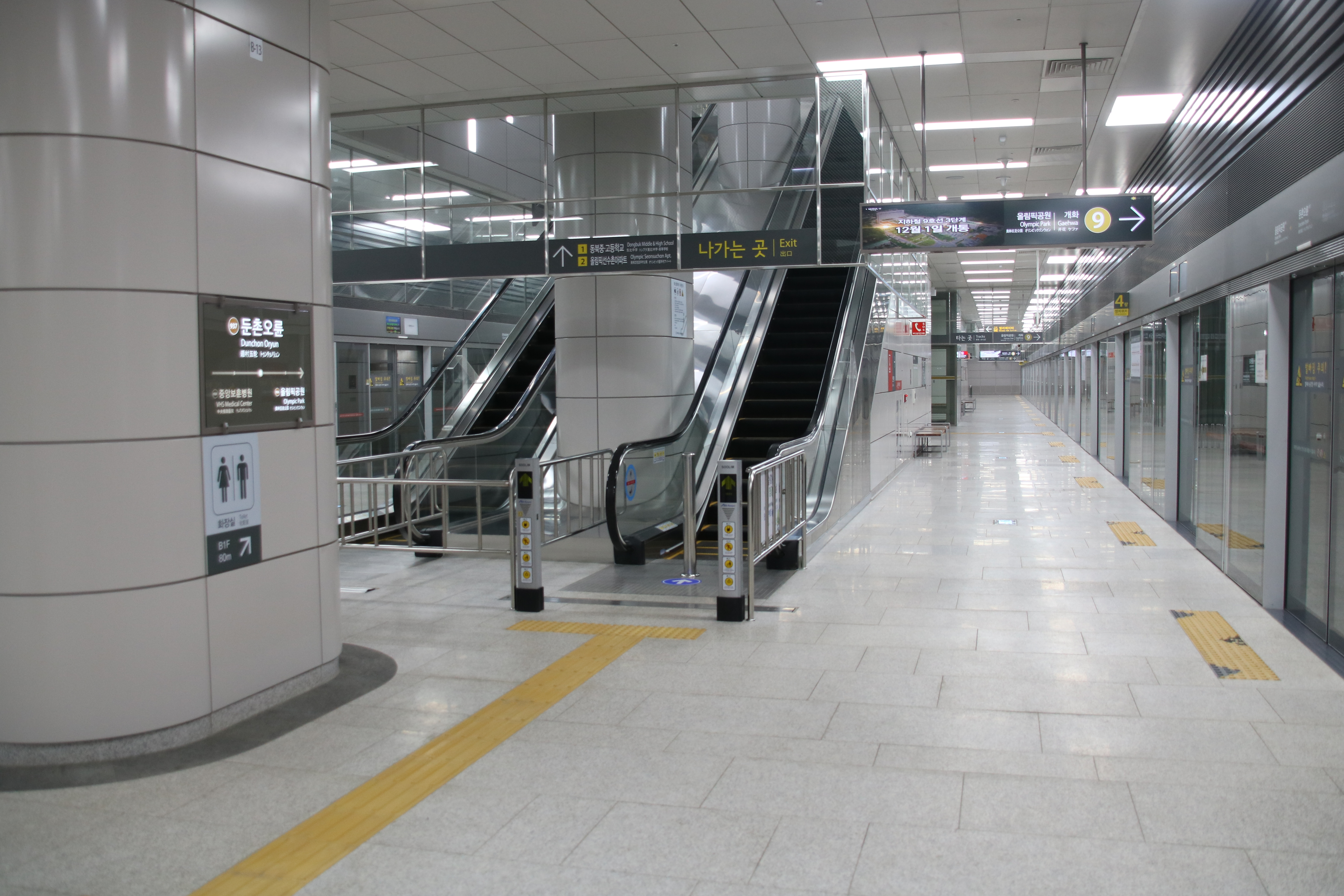
- Station platform

Korean name
- Hangul: 둔촌오륜역
- Hanja: 遁村五輪驛
- Revised Romanization: Dunchonoryunnyeok
- McCune–Reischauer: Tunch'onoryunnyŏk

General information
- Location: Gangdong-gu, Seoul
- Operator: Seoul Metro
- Line: Line 9
- Platforms: 1 island platform
- Tracks: 2

Construction
- Structure type: Underground

Key dates
- December 1, 2018: Line 9 opened
Location

Dunchon Oryun is a station on Line 9 of the Seoul Metropolitan Subway. It opened on December 1, 2018.

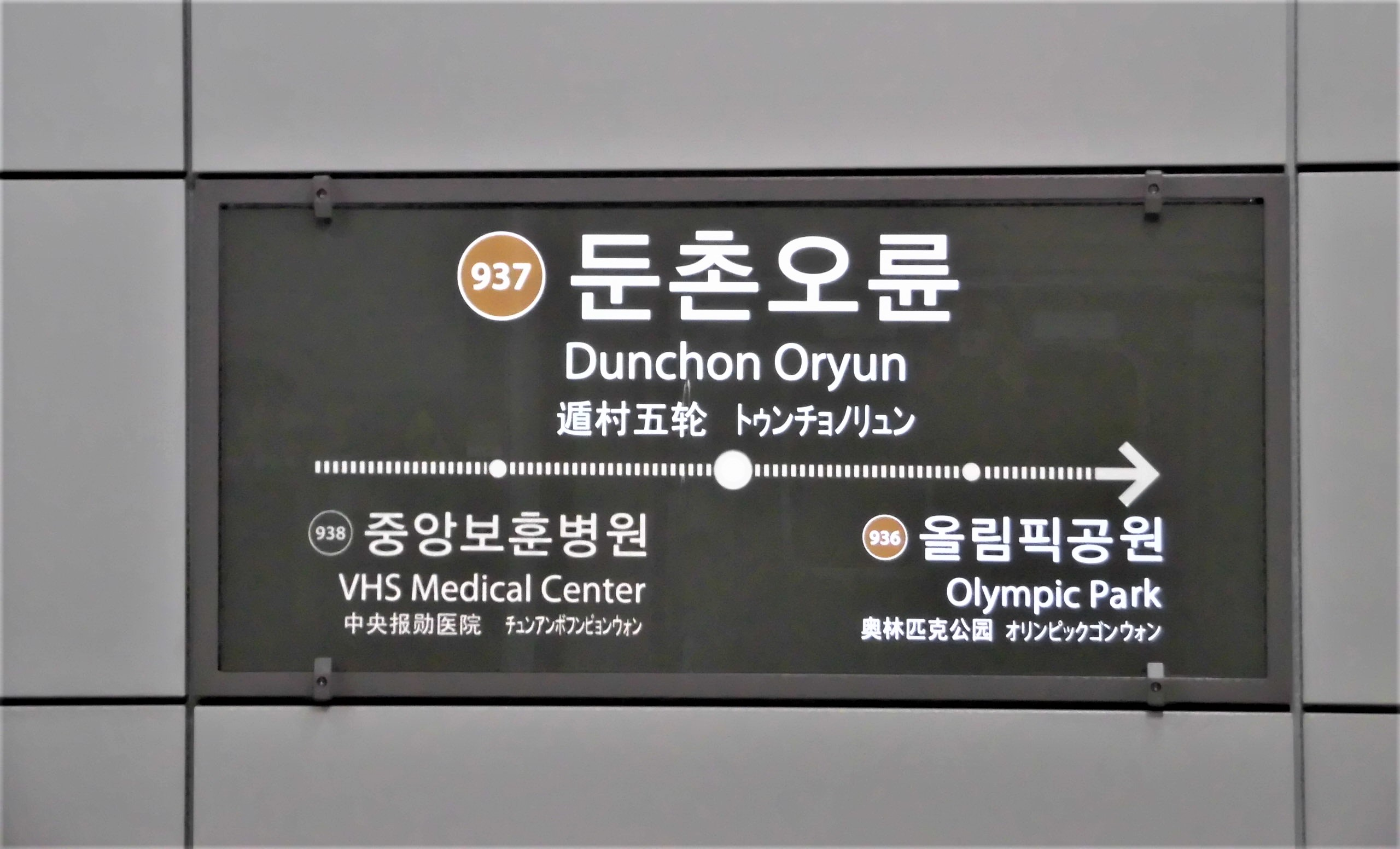
Station nameplate

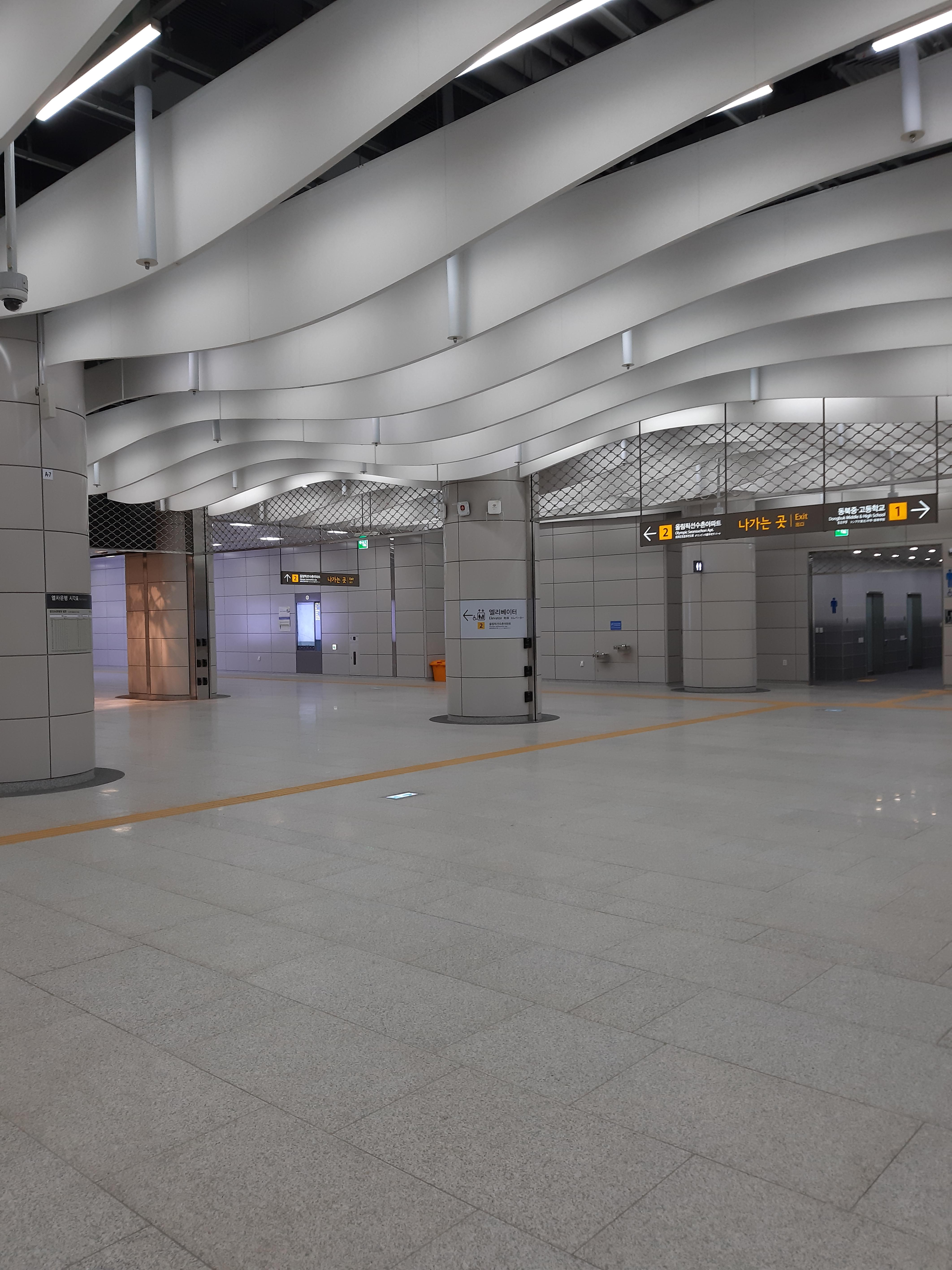
Station concourse

Preceding station	Seoul Metropolitan Subway	Following station
Olympic Park towards Gaehwa	Line 9	VHS Medical Center Terminus
