= Seoul Subway Line 9 =

Subway line in South Korea

Line 9
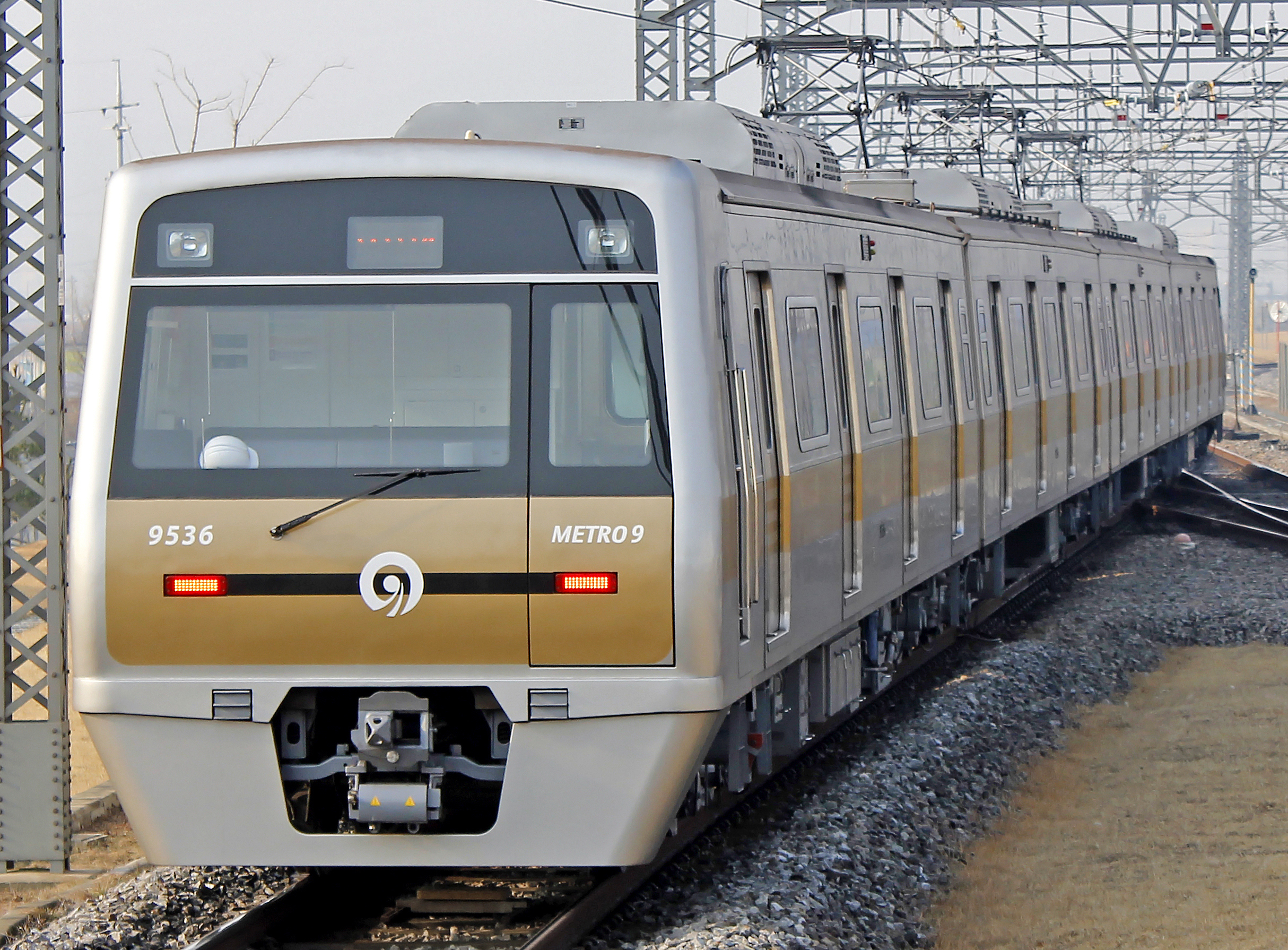

Overview
- Native name: 9호선(九號線); Gu Hoseon
- Status: Operational
- Owner: Seoul Metro Line 9 Corporation, Seoul Metro
- Termini: Gaehwa; VHS Medical Center
- Stations: 38

Service
- Type: Rapid transit
- System: Seoul Metropolitan Subway
- Operator: Seoul Line9 Operation
- Daily ridership: 647,033 (2024)
- Ridership: 236.81 million (2024) (▲4.2%)

History
- Opened: July 24, 2009; 17 years ago
- Last extension: 2018

Technical
- Line length: 40.6 km (25.2 mi)
- Num of tracks: 2 (4 at express service stations)
- Electrification: 1,500 V DC overhead catenary

Seoul Subway Line 9, operated by the Seoul Line9 Operation, is a subway line in Seoul, part of the Seoul Metropolitan Subway. The line runs east from Gaehwa station (local train terminal) or Gimpo International Airport station (express train terminal, connecting to Line 5, AREX, the Gimpo Goldline and the Seohae Line) along the south bank of the Han River towards VHS Medical Center in Gangdong. In 2019, Line 9 had an annual ridership of 225 million or about 616,000 people per day.

Line 9 was constructed as a double track subway, but several stations feature passing loops enabling express trains to overtake local trains. Express trains run around five times per hour in each direction. All stations are equipped with elevators, escalators, and platform screen doors.

Line 9 is one of two numbered lines to have a unique station sign design, a trait it shares with Line 6; it has a simplistic nameplate for its design, with no frame. The current number and name of the station (in Hangul, English, and Hanja) are displayed at the top, with the neighboring stations in the bottom corners. A triangle points in the direction trains run. Some stations like Eonju feature a black nameplate with a similar layout, but with the triangle replaced by a full arrow with a dotted body.

Phase 1 (Gaehwa to Sinnonhyeon) was the first privately run subway line in Korea. The franchise of phase 1 is Seoul Metro Line 9 Corporation (SML9), which oversaw the construction of phase 1. SML9 contracted the operation to Seoul Line9 (SL9), a joint venture of Hyundai Rotem (20%) and RATP Dev Transdev Asia (80%, formerly Veolia Transport Korea). Collectively, SLM9 and SL9 are known as Metro9. However, phase 2 (Sinnonhyeon to Sports Complex) and further phases are operated by Seoul Metro.

== History ==
Line 9 was one of the lines first discussed as part of Seoul's 3rd phase of subway construction in 1991. In 1993, Seoul announced a plan for new construction of subway lines 9~12 and the extension of subway line 3. Construction of the 3rd phase was delayed by the 1995 Daegu explosions, funding issues, the 1997 financial crisis and a 1998 review of the plan that reduced the scope of the 3rd phase. In 2001, the city passed the feasibility study and execution designs for line 9 and confirmed the commencement of construction.

Construction of Phase 1 between Gaehwa and Sinnonhyeon began in April 2002. Originally scheduled to open on June 12, 2009, the line opened on July 24, 2009, to ensure that the line was fully ready to begin service. Line 9 opened with 24 four-car trains numbered 9-01~9–24; the express service ran every 20 minutes and the local service every 6.7 minutes.

Due to increasing ridership (numbers soon exceeded 250,000 per day), 12 additional four-car trains were ordered to alleviate capacity constraints. These trains, numbered 9–25~9–36, entered service on October 15, 2011. This allowed for the express service headway to be shortened to 10 minutes and the local service headway to 5 minutes. On September 30, 2013, additional express trains were added during commuting times of 7 to 9 AM (from 22 to 36), further reducing the headway.

Phase 2 extended the line from Sinnonhyeon in Gangnam to Sports Complex station (Seoul) on Line 2, and was opened on March 28, 2015. Phase 3 further extended the line to VHS Medical Center Station in eastern Seoul, and was opened on December 1, 2018. The following workdays saw a 6.4% increase in passengers, roughly 145,000 people, as the line now services a larger area to the east.

Due to severe capacity issues on the express service due to increasing ridership, express trains were gradually lengthened to six cars starting on December 30, 2017. Non-express trains were also expanded to six-car trains by the end of 2019. An additional three trains were expected to be delivered by the end of 2019, but have not been delivered as of January 2020.

=== Future ===
The line is expected to be extended four stops north to Saemteo Park in Gangdong. One of the stations will provide another transfer to Seoul Subway Line 5 at Godeok.

The Korean government initially proposed a one-seat ride from Incheon International Airport to Gangnam via Gimpo International Airport using either Line 9 or Airport Railroad trains sharing their rights of way by the year 2023. This proposal so far has not been implemented thus making it necessary to transfer trains at Gimpo International Airport.

=== Ticket price debate ===
Negotiations in 2005 between the operator and the Seoul city government resulted in an agreement of a basic fare rate set at 1,264 won upon opening of the line in 2009 with a further increase to 1,398 won by 2012 to allow for inflation. Prior to opening of the line, the operator requested a base rate of 1,300 won. The city government decided against this by citing a domestic financial crisis and potential complaints from riders if the price was set at a higher rate than the rest of the subway system. The city therefore set the initial ticket fare at 900 won, the standard fare for entrance to the rest of the Seoul subway system in 2009. The rate was locked for a period of 12 months and was later locked for three years despite multiple requests from the operator for a higher starting fare.

In February 2012, the price increased to 1,050 won across all metro lines, including Line 9. Within two months, Metro9, the operator of Line 9, announced the price would further increase another 500 won starting from June 16, 2012 on only Line 9. The Seoul city government disagreed with this and threatened to fine Metro9 10 million won per day if the 500 won price increase occurred. The planned rate increase was withdrawn on May 9, and Metro9 issued an apology. Seoul City will be in negotiations again with the help of legal counsel to determine the differences of opinions in the original agreement. Currently, an additional scan of a metro card transfers in between Line 9 and other Seoul subway lines does not accrue additional fees.

== Construction costs and deficit ==
The construction of Phase 1 cost 900 billion won (roughly equivalent to 827 million US dollars), 480 billion of which was pooled between 12 firms with the remaining borne by Seoul city and the national government. By 2012, the line was operating at a loss with 90% of losses being covered by the city. The accumulated deficit has passed 180 billion won.

While Phase 2 was always planned to go ahead as scheduled, a Seoul Metropolitan Government website at one point described construction of Phase 3 as being suspended in consideration of transport demand and financial considerations. On November 20, 2008, the Seoul Metropolitan government announced plans to build Phase 3 between October 2010 and December 2015.

== Stations ==
Express trains stop at stations marked "●" and pass stations marked "|". There is no express service at stations filled in black on the "EX" column.

All stations are in Seoul.

The names of the stations to open in 2028 are subject to change.

Station number	Station name English	Station name Hangul	EX	Transfer	Distance in km	Total distance	Location
901	Gaehwa	개화			---	0.0	Gangseo-gu
902	Gimpo Int'l Airport	김포공항	●	Gimpo Goldline Seohae Line	3.6	3.6	Gangseo-gu
903	Airport Market	공항시장	|		0.8	4.4	Gangseo-gu
904	Sinbanghwa	신방화	|		0.8	5.2	Gangseo-gu
905	Magongnaru (Seoul Botanic Park)	마곡나루 (서울식물원)	●	AREX	0.9	6.1	Gangseo-gu
906	Yangcheon Hyanggyo	양천향교	|		1.4	7.5	Gangseo-gu
907	Gayang	가양	●		1.3	8.8	Gangseo-gu
908	Jeungmi	증미	|		0.7	9.5	Gangseo-gu
909	Deungchon	등촌	|		1.0	10.5	Gangseo-gu
910	Yeomchang	염창	●		0.9	11.4	Gangseo-gu
911	Sinmokdong	신목동	|		0.9	12.3	Yangcheon-gu
912	Seonyudo	선유도	|		1.2	13.5	Yeongdeungpo-gu
913	Dangsan	당산	●	Seoul Subway Line 2	1.0	14.5	Yeongdeungpo-gu
914	National Assembly (KDB Bank)	국회의사당 (KDB산업은행)	|		1.5	16.0	Yeongdeungpo-gu
915	Yeouido	여의도	●	Seoul Subway Line 5	0.9	16.9	Yeongdeungpo-gu
916	Saetgang (KB Financial Town)	샛강 (KB금융타운)	|	Sillim Line	0.8	17.7	Yeongdeungpo-gu
917	Noryangjin	노량진	●	Seoul Subway Line 1	1.2	18.9	Dongjak-gu
918	Nodeul	노들	|		1.1	20.0	Dongjak-gu
919	Heukseok (Chung-Ang Univ.)	흑석 (중앙대입구)	|		1.1	21.1	Dongjak-gu
920	Dongjak (Seoul National Cemetery)	동작 (현충원)	●	Seoul Subway Line 4	1.4	22.5	Dongjak-gu
921	Gubanpo	구반포	|		1.0	23.5	Seocho-gu
922	Sinbanpo	신반포	|		0.7	24.2	Seocho-gu
923	Express Bus Terminal	고속터미널	●	Seoul Subway Line 3 Seoul Subway Line 7	0.8	25.0	Seocho-gu
924	Sapyeong	사평	|		1.1	26.1	Seocho-gu
925	Sinnonhyeon	신논현	●	Shinbundang Line	0.9	27.0	Gangnam-gu
926	Eonju (CHA Gangnam Medical Center)	언주 (강남차병원)	|		0.8	27.8	Gangnam-gu
927	Seonjeongneung	선정릉	●	Suin–Bundang Line	0.9	28.7	Gangnam-gu
928	Samseong Jungang	삼성중앙	|		0.8	29.5	Gangnam-gu
929	Bongeunsa	봉은사	●		0.8	30.3	Gangnam-gu
930	Sports Complex	종합운동장	●	Seoul Subway Line 2	1.4	31.7	Songpa-gu
931	Samjeon	삼전	|		1.4	33.1	Songpa-gu
932	Seokchon Gobun	석촌고분	|		0.8	33.9	Songpa-gu
933	Seokchon (Hansol Hospital)	석촌 (한솔병원)	●	Seoul Subway Line 8	1.0	34.9	Songpa-gu
934	Songpanaru	송파나루	|		0.8	35.7	Songpa-gu
935	Hanseong Baekje	한성백제	|		0.8	36.5	Songpa-gu
936	Olympic Park (Korea National Sport Univ.)	올림픽공원 (한국체대)	●	Seoul Subway Line 5	1.4	37.9	Songpa-gu
937	Dunchon Oryun	둔촌오륜	|		1.0	38.9	Gangdong-gu
938	VHS Medical Center	중앙보훈병원	●		1.7	40.6	Gangdong-gu
939	Gil-dong Ecological Park (2028)	길동생태공원	|		1.1	41.7	Gangdong-gu
940	Hanyoung Foreign Language High School (2028)	한영외고	|		1.1	42.8	Gangdong-gu
941	Godeok (Kyung Hee Univ. Hospital at Gangdong) (2028)	고덕 (강동경희대병원)	●	Seoul Subway Line 5	0.8	43.6	Gangdong-gu
942	Saemteo Park (2028)	샘터공원			1.3	44.9	Gangdong-gu

== Ridership ==
Seoul Subway Line 9 Ridership (Note: The ridership is calculated based on boarding and transferring passengers (a+c))
Year	Ridership	Change (%)	Remarks
2026		-	
2025		-	
2024	236,814,000	▲4.2	Highest on record
2023	227,326,000	▲7.2	Restoration of 2019 ridership levels
2022	212,087,000	▲17.1	
2021	181,126,000	▲5.5	
2020	171,634,000	▼23.7	COVID-19 pandemic
2019	224,909,000	▲19.9	
2018	187,562,000	▲3.0	Expansion to VHS Medical Center begins operation
2017	182,186,000	▲2.9	
2016	177,048,000	▲13.0	
2015	156,652,000	▲11.6	Expansion to Sports Complex begins service
2014	140,314,000	▲4.3	
2013	134,515,000	▲7.8	
2012	124,774,000	▲13.9	
2011	109,568,000	▲12.8	
2010	97,145,000	-	Service began on April 24, 2009

== See also ==
- Rapid transit in South Korea
