= VHS Medical Center station =

Station of the Seoul Metropolitan Subway

중앙보훈병원; VHS Medical Center
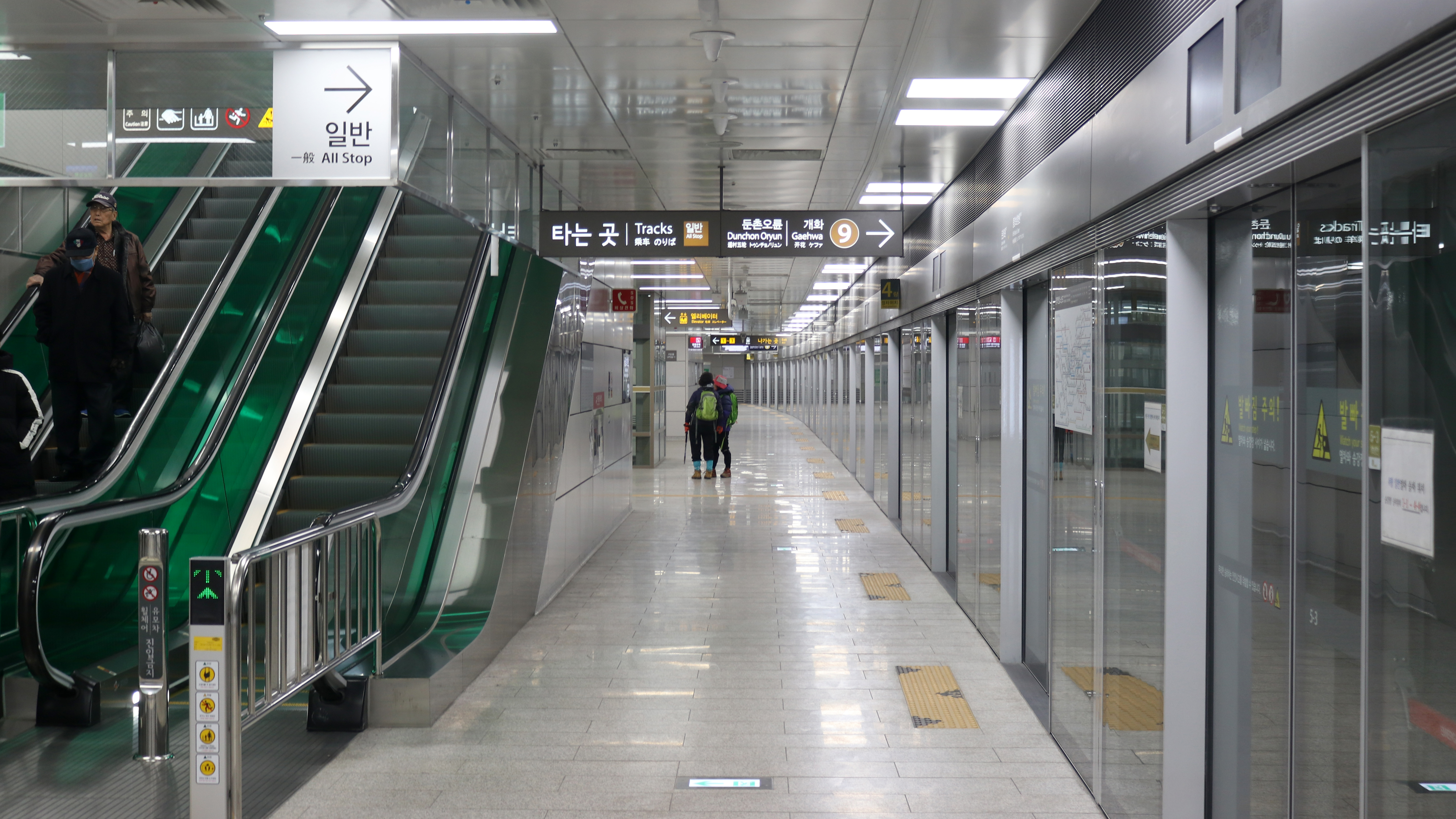
- Line 9 (All stops) platform

Korean name
- Hangul: 중앙보훈병원역
- Hanja: 中央報勳病院驛
- Revised Romanization: Jungangbohunbyeongwonnyeok
- McCune–Reischauer: Chung'angbohunbyŏngwŏnnyŏk

General information
- Location: 117, Myeongil-ro, Gangdong-gu, Seoul
- Coordinates: 37°31′44″N 127°08′55″E
- Operator: Seoul Metro
- Line: Line 9
- Platforms: 1 side platform 1 island platform
- Tracks: 3

Construction
- Structure type: Underground

Key dates
- December 1, 2018: Line 9 opened
Location

VHS Medical Center Station is a terminal railway station on Seoul Subway Line 9 in Gangdong-gu, Seoul. It became the line's southern terminus on December 1, 2018, when phase 3 was completed. The acronym VHS stands for "Veterans Health Service".

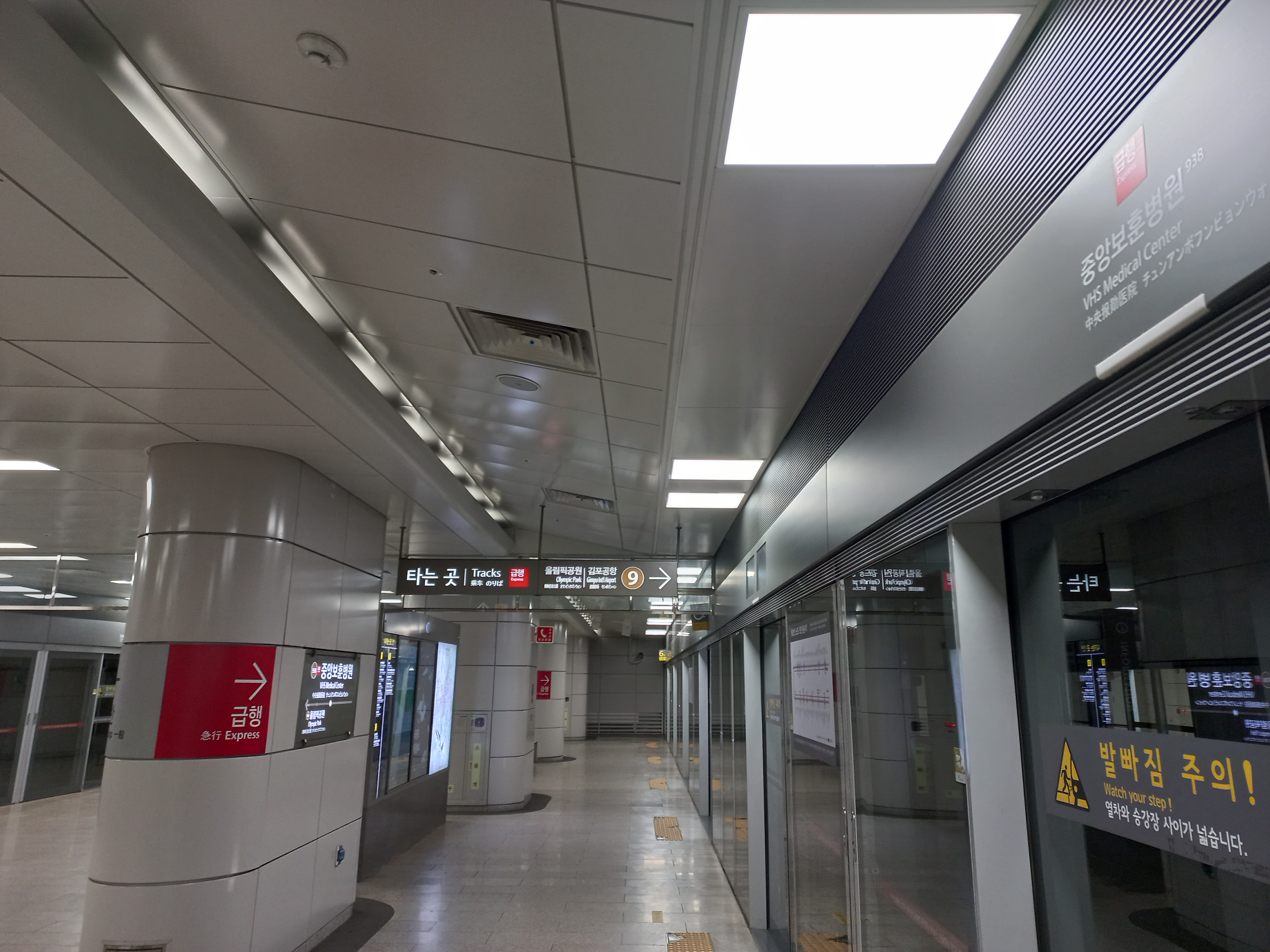
Line 9 (Express) platform

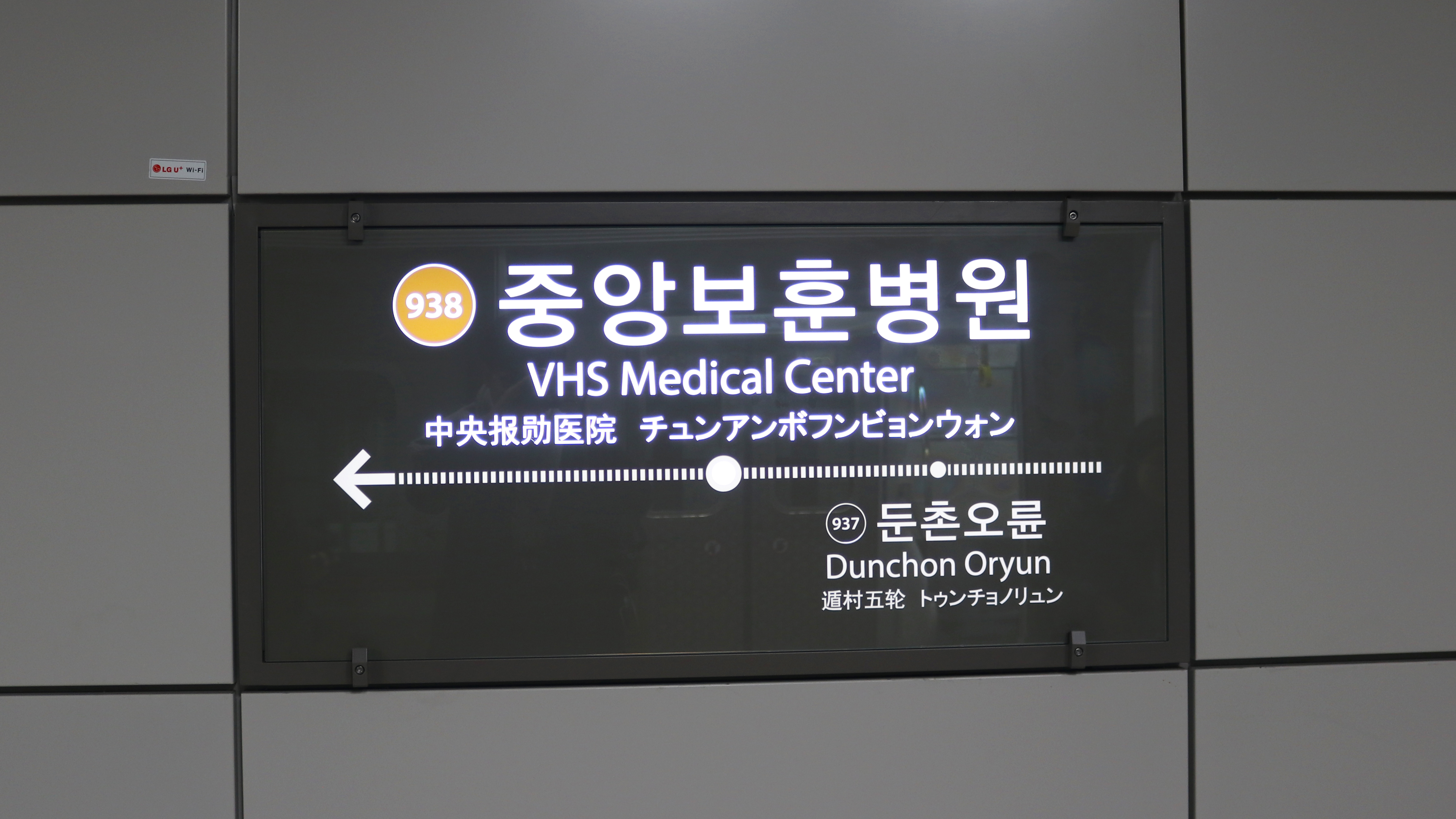
Line 9 (All stops) station platform sign

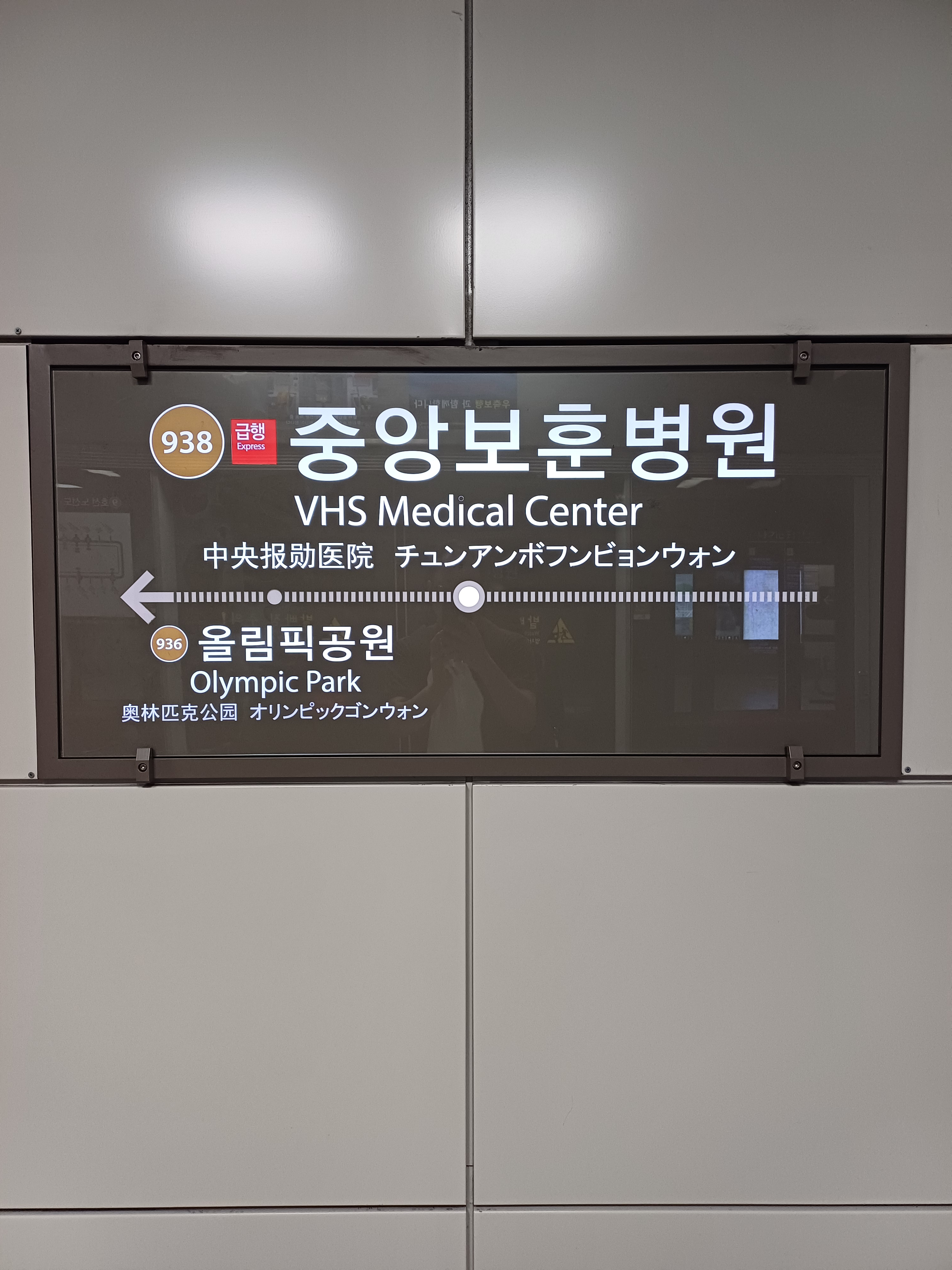
Line 9 (Express) station platform sign

Preceding station	Seoul Metropolitan Subway	Following station
Dunchon Oryun towards Gaehwa	Line 9	Terminus
Olympic Park towards Gimpo International Airport	Line 9 Express	Terminus
