= Gaehwa station =

Subway station in Seoul, South Korea

개화; Gaehwa
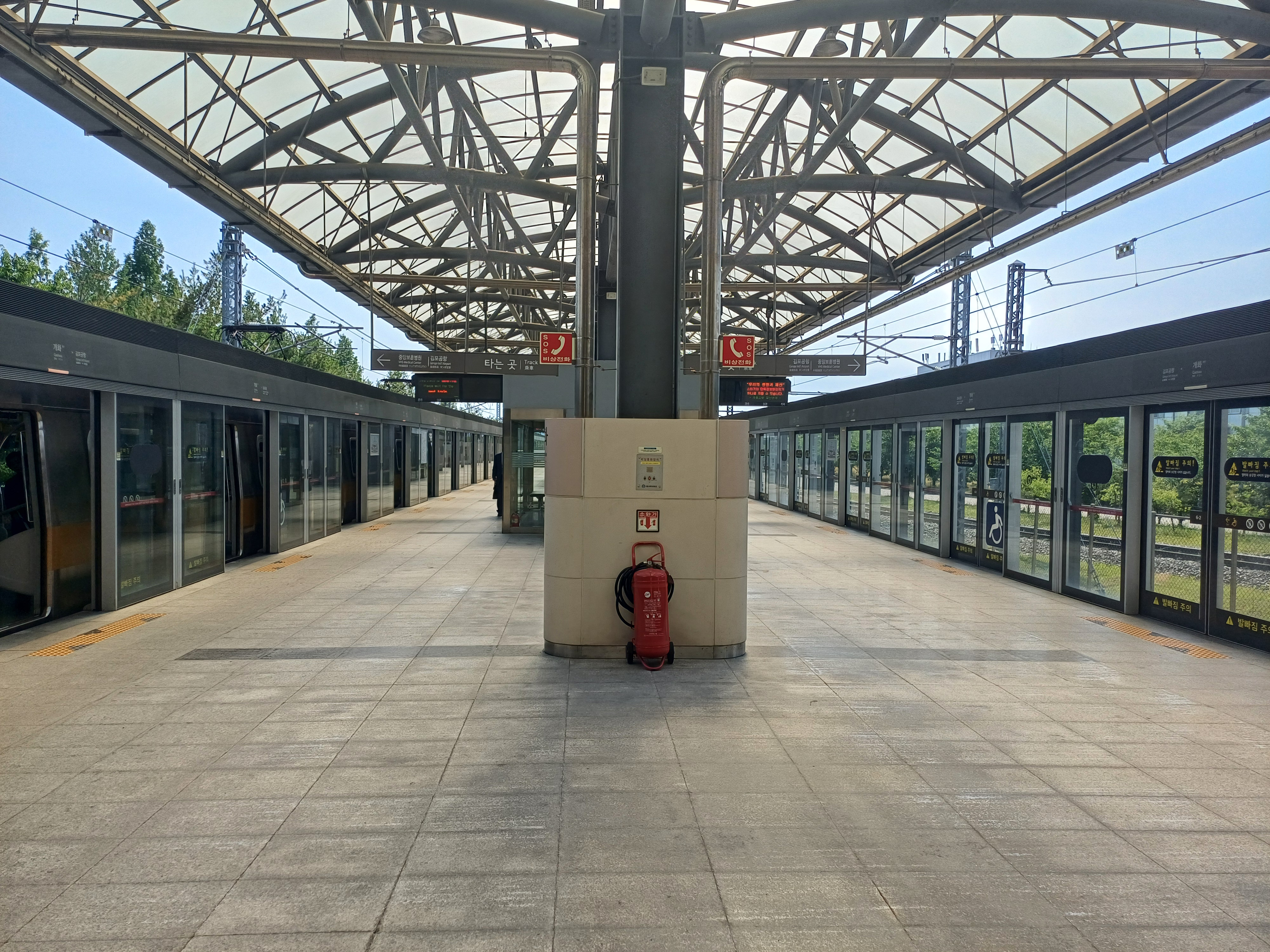
- Station Platform

Korean name
- Hangul: 개화역
- Hanja: 開花驛
- Revised Romanization: Gaehwa-yeok
- McCune–Reischauer: Kaehwa-yŏk

General information
- Location: Gaehwa-dongno 8-gil 38; Gangseo-gu, Seoul
- Coordinates: 37°34′42″N 126°47′49″E
- Operator: Seoul Metro Line 9 Corporation
- Line: Line 9
- Platforms: 1 island platform
- Tracks: 2
- Bus routes: 601 605; 6631 6632 6633 6641 6647; 9602; 2 6 8 33 60 60-2 60-3 66 68 69 78 85 85-1 88 150 300 631 1002 9000

Construction
- Structure type: Aboveground

History
- Opened: July 24, 2009

Services
Preceding station	Seoul Metropolitan Subway	Following station
Terminus	Line 9	Gimpo International Airport towards VHS Medical Center
Location

Gaehwa Station is the only elevated station and western terminus of Seoul Subway Line 9. It is located near the border of Gimpo. It houses the headquarters of the Seoul Metro Line 9 Corporation.

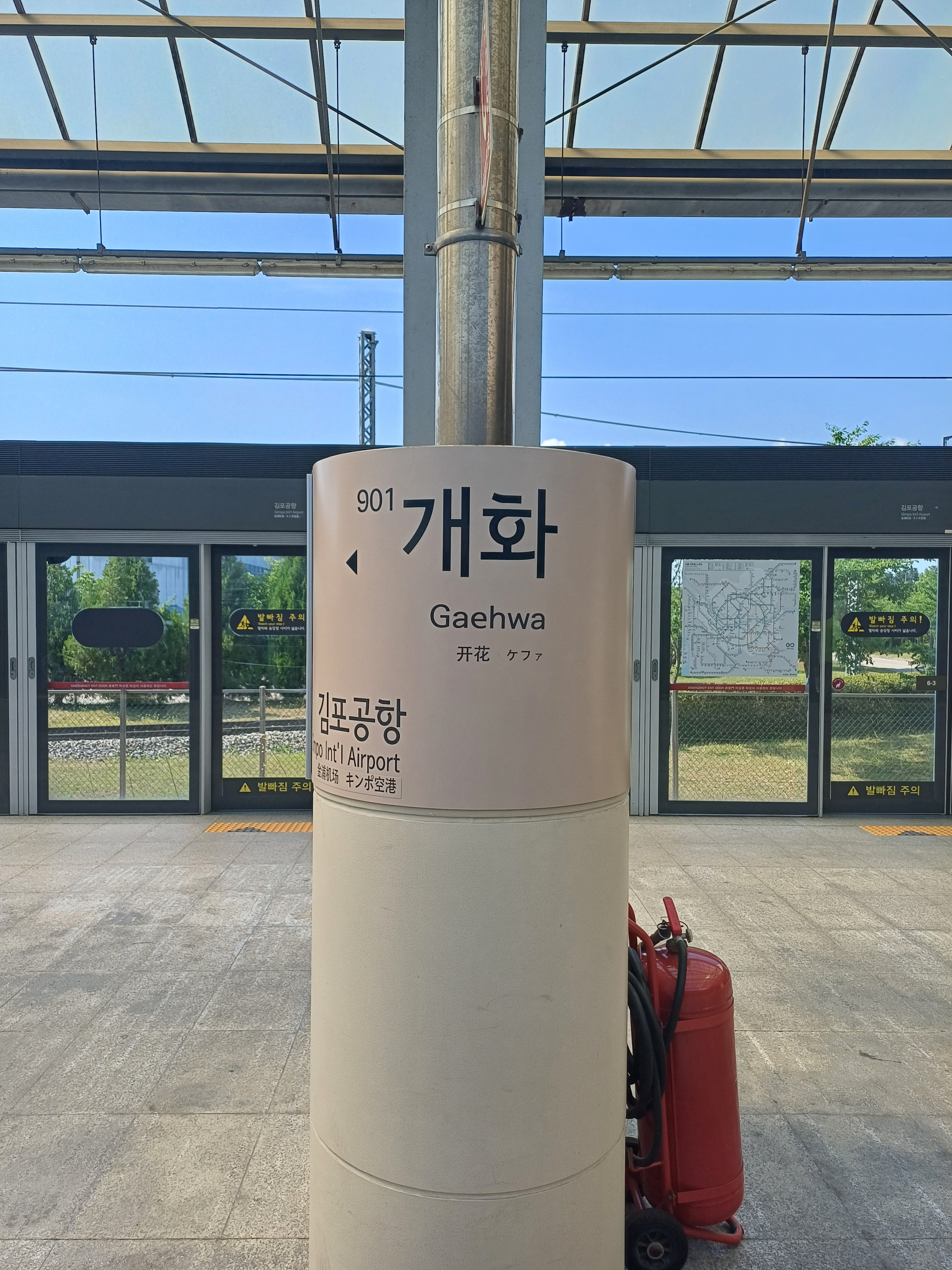
Station nameplate

== Station layout ==
L2; Platform level
L2; Platform level	Eastbound	→ Line 9 Local toward VHS Medical Center (Gimpo International Airport) →
L2; Platform level	Island platform, doors will open on the left, right
L2; Platform level	Eastbound	→ Line 9 Local toward VHS Medical Center (Gimpo International Airport) →
L1; Concourse	Lobby	Customer Service, Shops, Vending machines, ATMs
G	Street level	Exit
