= Yongwang =

Yongwang (Korean: 용왕; Hanja: 龍王, literally Dragon King) may refer to:

- Yongwangdam or Heaven Lake, a lake on the border between North Korea and China
- Yongwang mountain, a mountain in Mok-dong, Yangcheon District, Seoul
