= Sinmokdong station =

Railway station in Seoul, South Korea

Coordinates: 37°32′39″N 126°52′59″E

신목동 (이대목동병원); Sinmokdong (Ewha Womans University Mokdong Hospital)
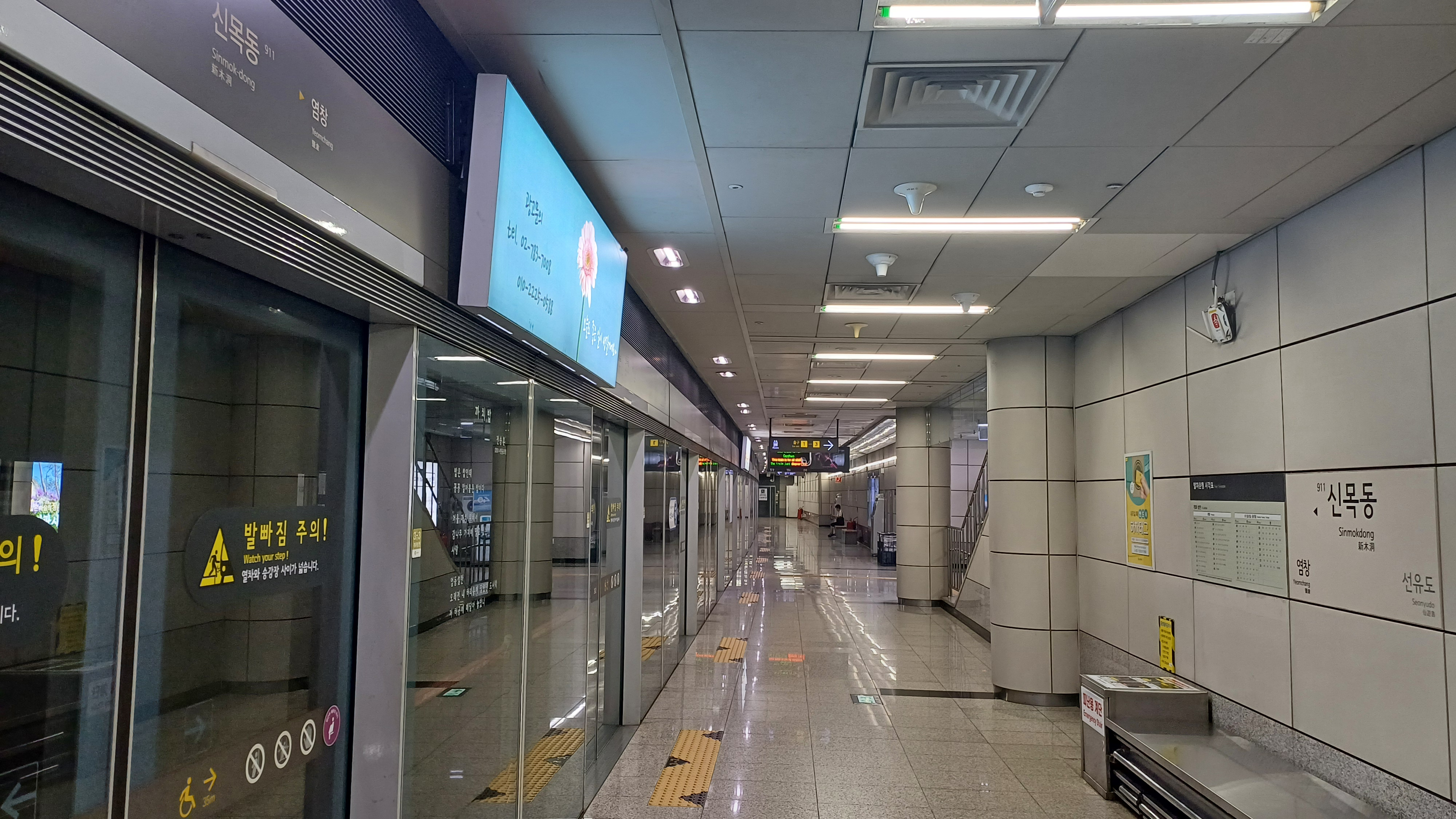
- Station platform

Korean name
- Hangul: 신목동역
- Hanja: 新木洞驛
- Revised Romanization: Sinmokdong-nyeok
- McCune–Reischauer: Sinmoktong-nyŏk

General information
- Location: 940-12 Mok-dong; Yangcheon-gu, Seoul
- Operator: Seoul Metro Line 9 Corporation
- Line: Line 9
- Platforms: 2 side platforms
- Tracks: 2

Construction
- Structure type: Underground

History
- Opened: July 24, 2009
Location

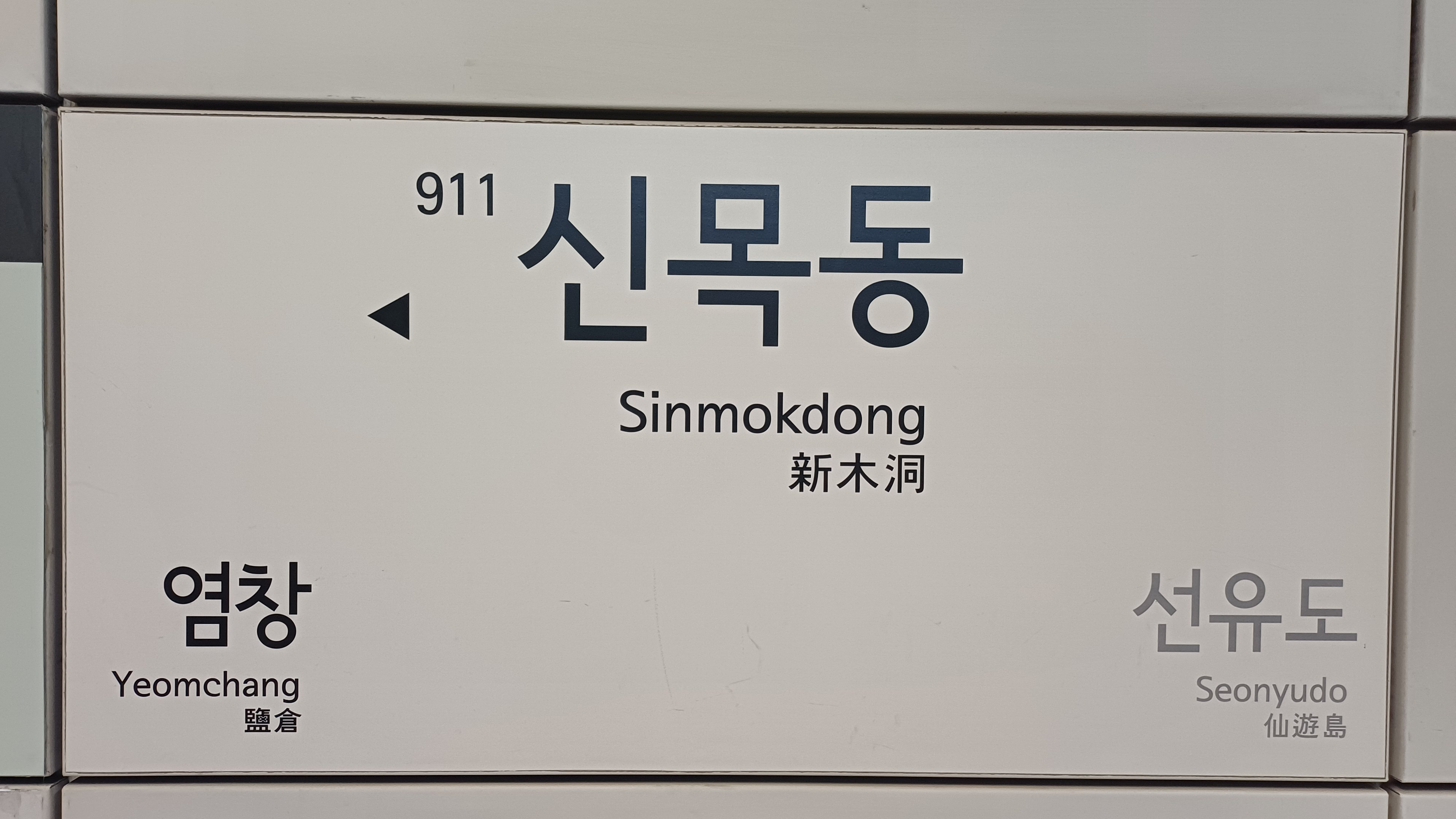
Station nameplate

Sinmokdong is a railway station on Line 9 of the Seoul Subway.

== Name ==
The station was originally proposed to be named Yongwangsan station after Yongwang mountain, but was changed to its current name due to the request of residents.

=== Exit names ===
Exit 1 is named after Yongwang mountain park, Exit 2 is connected to Mokwon elementary school, Mokdong 119 safety center, and the Ewha Womans University Mokdong Hospital. Exit 3 connects to bicycle parking spaces and the Anyangcheon stream.

== Station layout ==
G	Street level	Exit(1~3)

L1; Concourse	Lobby	Customer Service, Shops, Vending machines, ATMs

L2; Platform level	Side platform, doors will open on the right
L2; Platform level	Westbound	← Line 9 Local toward Gaehwa (Yeomchang) ← Line 9 Express does not stop here
L2; Platform level	Eastbound	Line 9 Local toward VHS Medical Center (Seonyudo) → Line 9 Express does not stop here →
L2; Platform level	Side platform, doors will open on the right

Preceding station	Seoul Metropolitan Subway	Following station
Yeomchang towards Gaehwa	Line 9	Seonyudo towards VHS Medical Center
