= Yanghwa-dong =

- Country: South Korea

Korean name
- Hangul: 양화동
- Hanja: 楊花洞
- RR: Yanghwa-dong
- MR: Yanghwa-dong

Yanghwa-dong (Korean: 양화동) is a dong (neighbourhood) of Yeongdeungpo District, Seoul, South Korea. It is a legal dong (법정동 法定洞) managed by its administrative dong (행정동 行政洞), Yangpyeong 2-dong.

== See also ==
- Administrative divisions of South Korea
