= Dangsan station =

Train station in South Korea

당산; Dangsan
당산; Dangsan
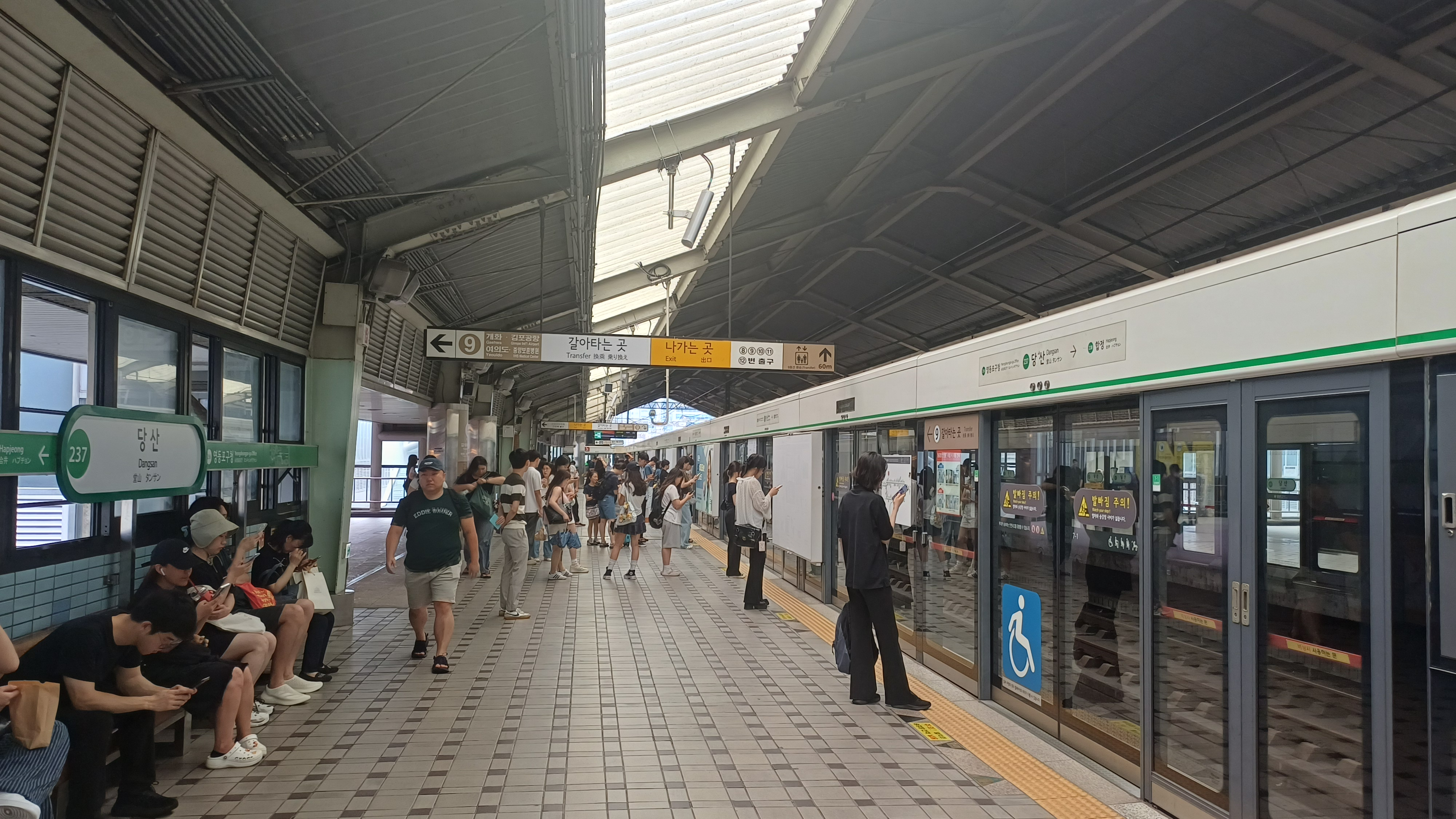
- Line 2 platform

Korean name
- Hangul: 당산역
- Hanja: 堂山驛
- RR: Dangsan-yeok
- MR: Tangsan-yŏk

General information
- Location: 323-1 Dangsan-dong 6-ga, 229 Dangsanno, Yeongdeungpo-gu, Seoul
- Coordinates: 37°32′04″N 126°54′08″E
- Operator: Seoul Metro; Seoul Metro Line 9 Corporation
- Lines: Line 2 Line 9
- Platforms: 3
- Tracks: 4

Key dates
- May 22, 1984: Line 2 opened
- July 24, 2009: Line 9 opened

Passengers
- (Daily) Based on Jan-Dec of 2012. Line 2: 51,882; Line 9: 25,083
Services
Preceding station	Seoul Metropolitan Subway	Following station
Yeongdeungpo-gu Office Next counterclockwise	Line 2	Hapjeong Next clockwise
Seonyudo towards Gaehwa	Line 9	National Assembly towards VHS Medical Center
Yeomchang towards Gimpo International Airport	Line 9 Express	Yeouido towards VHS Medical Center
Location

Dangsan Station (Korean: 당산역) is an elevated station on the Seoul Subway Line 2 and is an underground station on the Seoul Subway Line 9. The station is located on the south bank of the Han River in Yeongdeungpo District. Because the station is elevated, trains exiting to or entering from the north make use of the Dangsan Railway Bridge. As of April 2009, the platform has been outfitted with platform screen doors. Dangsan station is currently a transfer point between Line 2 and Seoul Subway Line 9. Several Korean TV series were shot in nearby locations, like Boys Over Flowers, Iris or My Girlfriend is a Gumiho.

Seoul Subway Line 2 has two-sided relative platforms, Seoul Subway Line 9 has one island platform, and the platforms on both lines have platform screen doors.

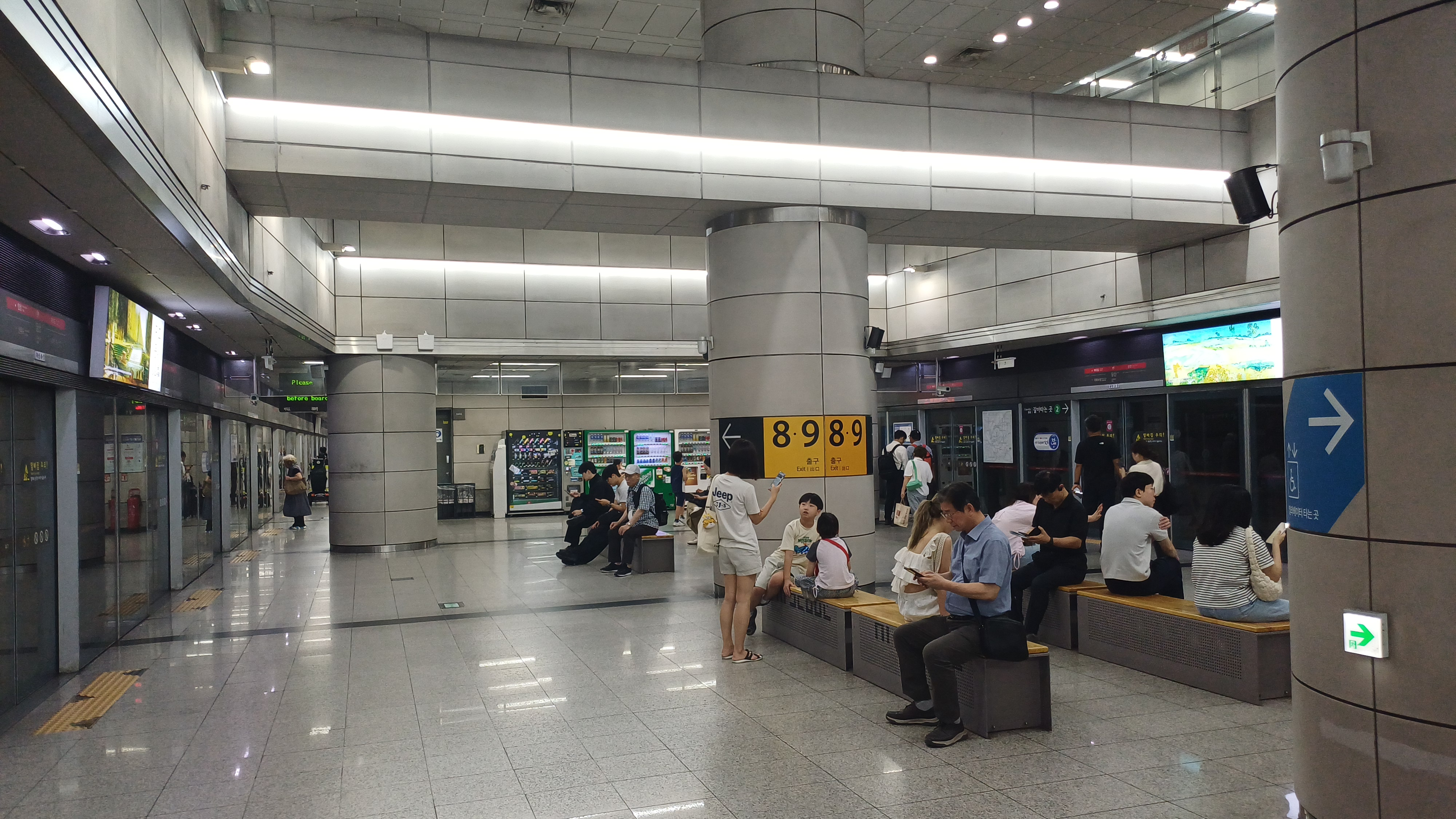
Line 9 platforms

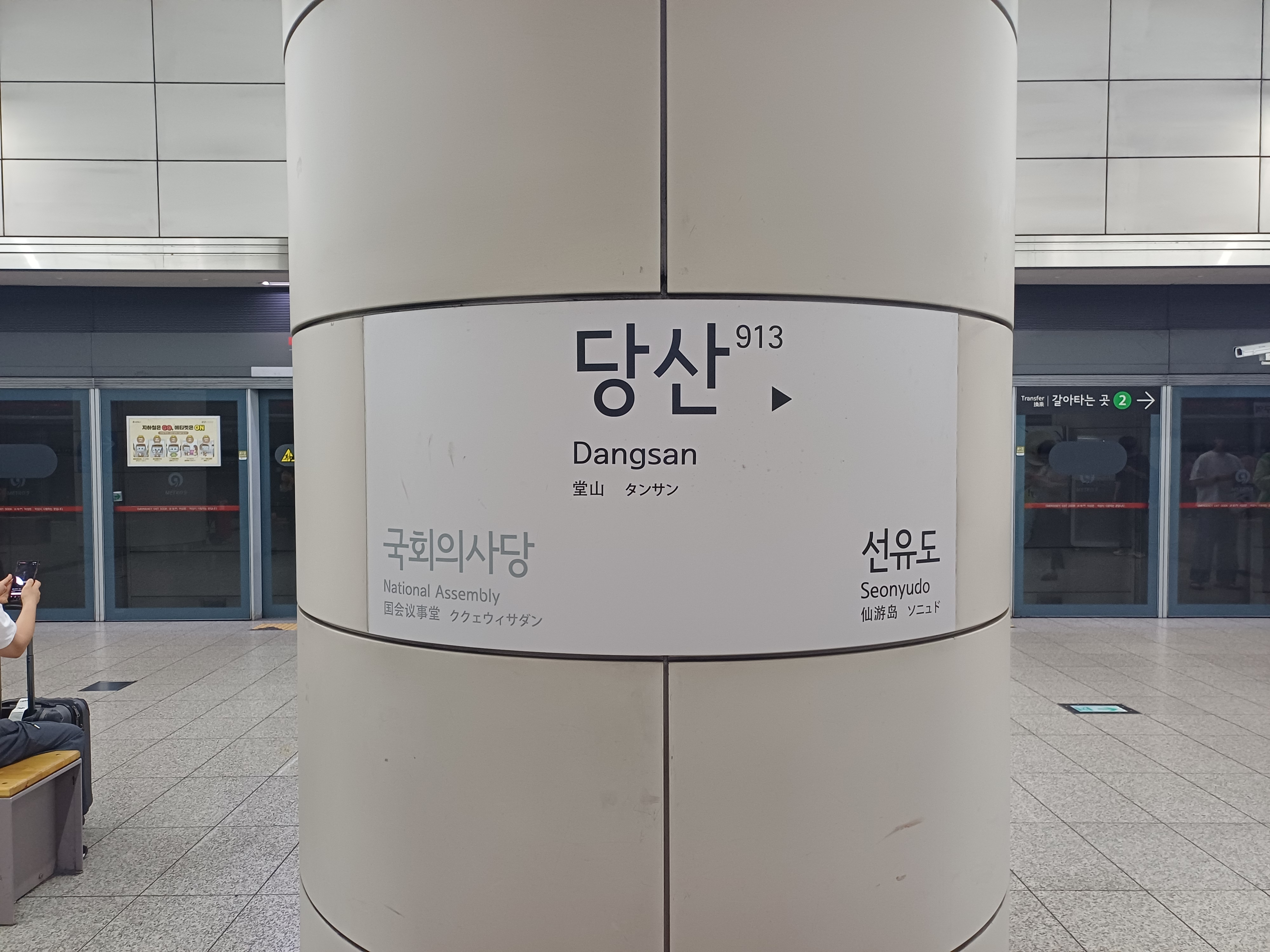
Line 9 station nameplate
