= Seonyudo station =

Metro station in South Korea

Coordinates: 37°32′16″N 126°53′38″E

선유도; Seonyudo
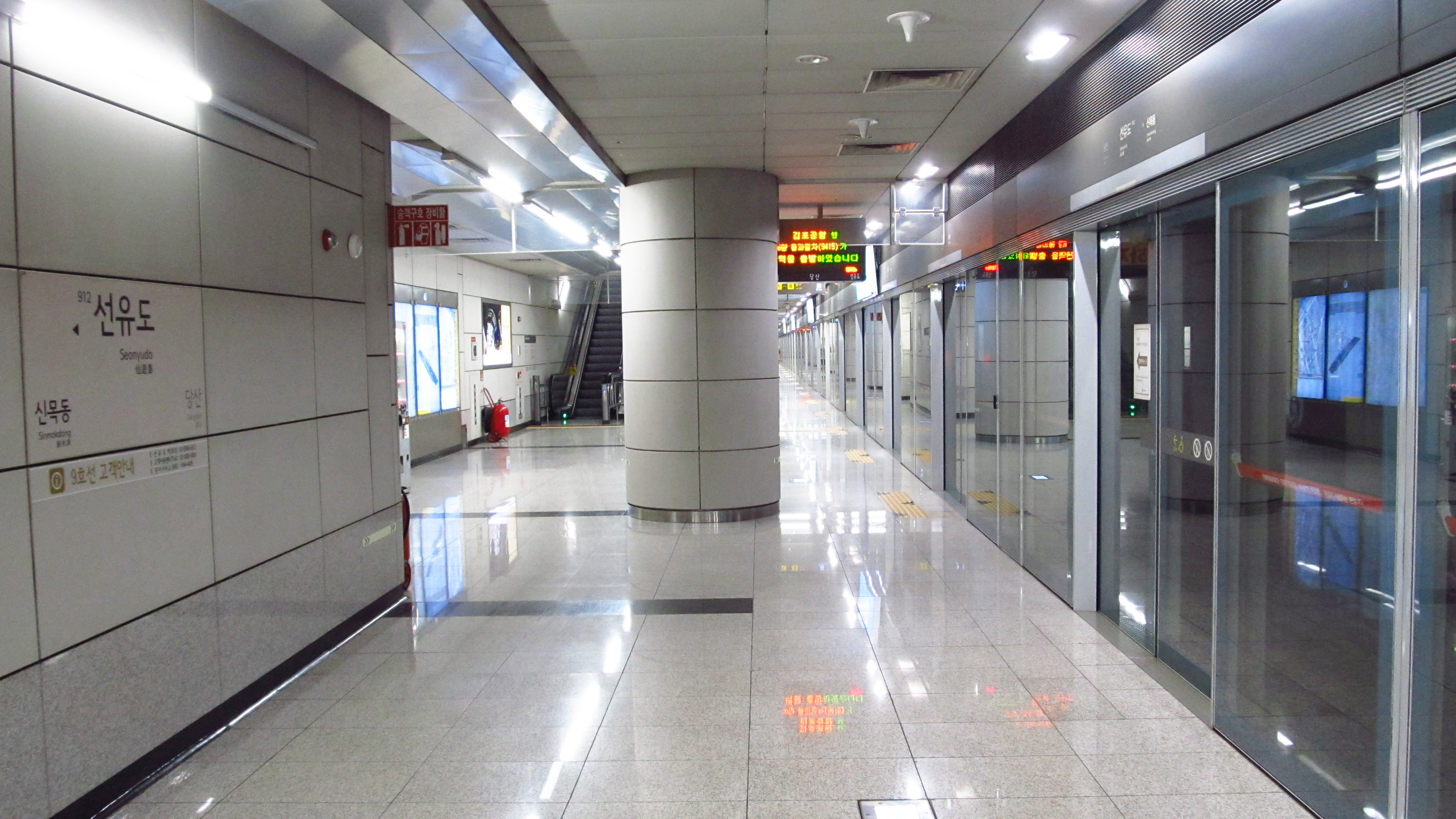
- Station platform

Korean name
- Hangul: 선유도역
- Hanja: 仙遊島驛
- Revised Romanization: Seonyudo-yeok
- McCune–Reischauer: Sŏnyudo-yŏk

General information
- Location: 61-2 Yangpyeong-dong; Yeongdeungpo-gu, Seoul
- Operator: Seoul Metro Line 9 Corporation
- Line: Line 9
- Platforms: 2 side platforms
- Tracks: 4 (2 bypass tracks)

Construction
- Structure type: Underground

History
- Opened: July 24, 2009
Location

Seonyudo is a railway station on Line 9 of the Seoul Subway.

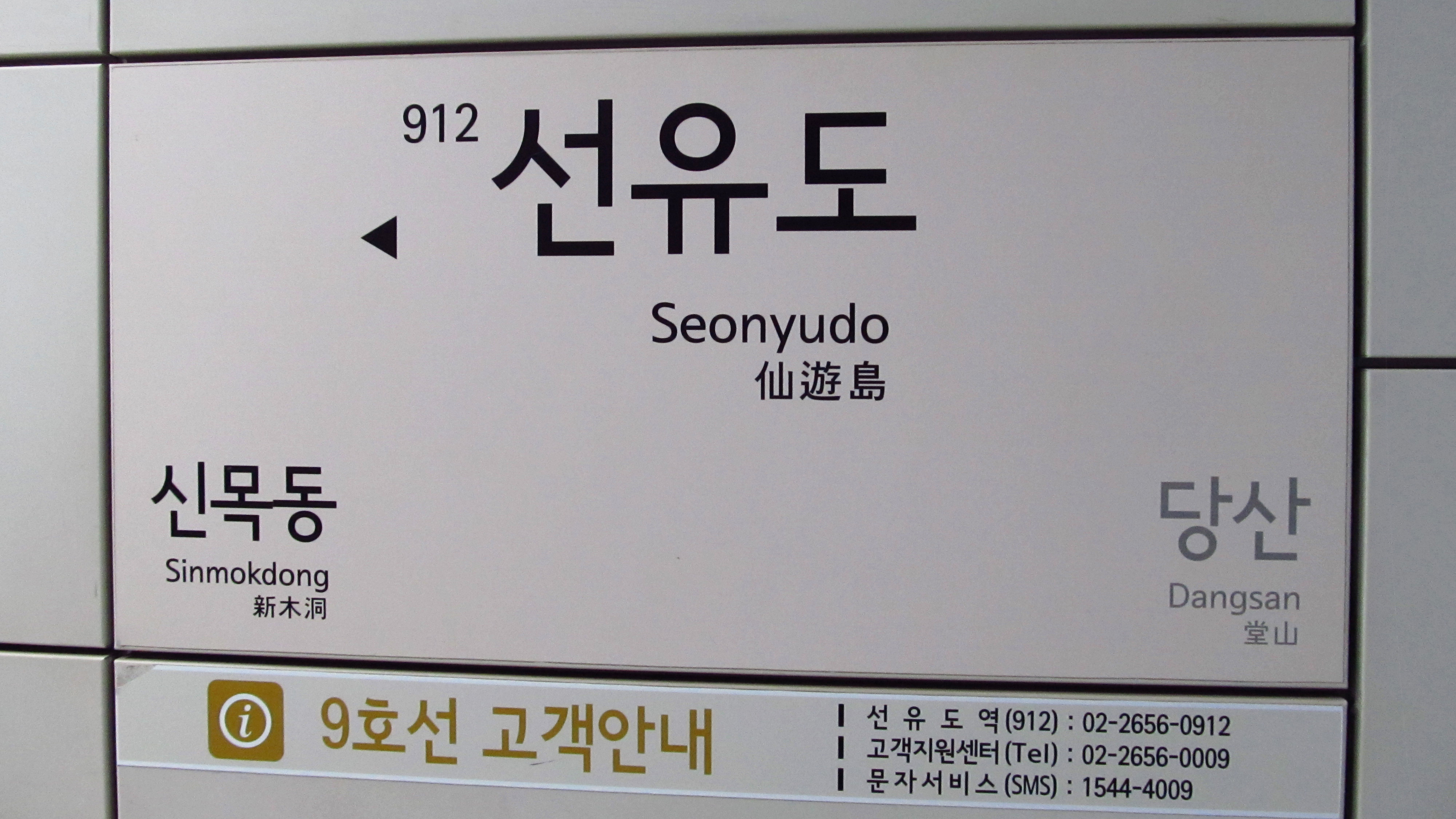
Station nameplate

== Station layout ==
G	Street level	Exit

L1; Concourse	Lobby	Customer service, shops, vending machines, ATMs

L2; Platform level	Side platform, doors will open on the right
L2; Platform level	Westbound local	← Line 9 Local toward Gaehwa (Sinmokdong)
L2; Platform level	Westbound express	← Line 9 Express does not stop here
L2; Platform level	Eastbound express	Line 9 Express does not stop here →
L2; Platform level	Eastbound local	Line 9 Local toward VHS Medical Center (Dangsan)
L2; Platform level	Side platform, doors will open on the right

Preceding station	Seoul Metropolitan Subway	Following station
Sinmokdong towards Gaehwa	Line 9	Dangsan towards VHS Medical Center
