= Yeouido station =

Station of the Seoul Metropolitan Subway

Coordinates: 37°31′18″N 126°55′27″E

여의도 (신한투자증권); Yeouido (Shinhan Securities)
여의도 (신한투자증권); Yeouido (Shinhan Securities)
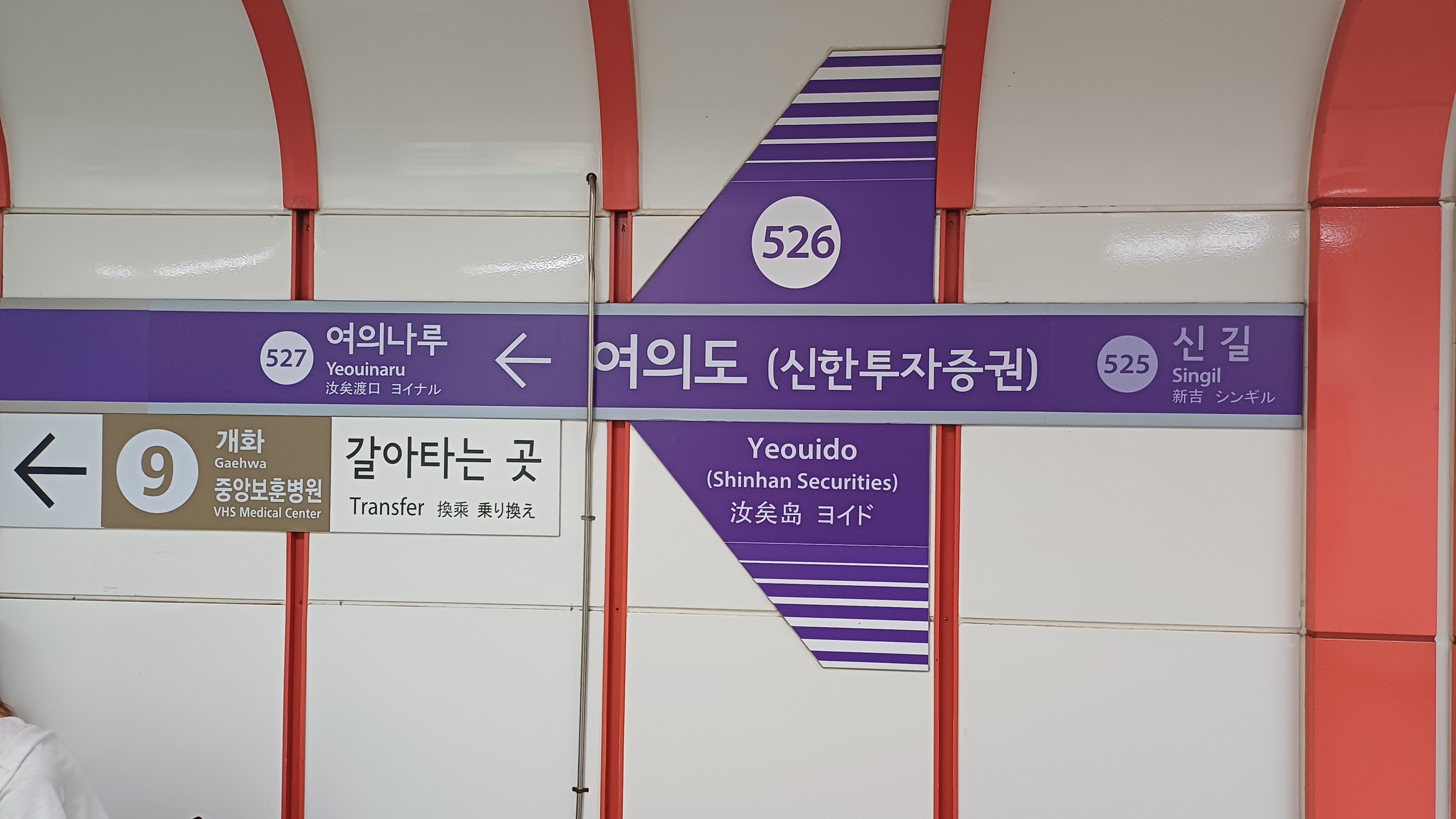
- Station sign (Line 5)

Korean name
- Hangul: 여의도역
- Hanja: 汝矣島驛
- Revised Romanization: Yeouido-yeok
- McCune–Reischauer: Yŏŭido-yŏk

General information
- Location: 3 Yeouido-dong, 40 Yeouinaruro, Yeongdeungpo-gu, Seoul
- Operator: Seoul Metro; Seoul Metro Line 9 Corporation
- Lines: Line 5 Line 9
- Platforms: 4
- Tracks: 4

Construction
- Structure type: Underground

Key dates
- August 12, 1996: Line 5 opened
- July 24, 2009: Line 9 opened
Services
Preceding station	Seoul Metropolitan Subway	Following station
Singil towards Banghwa	Line 5	Yeouinaru towards Hanam Geomdansan or Macheon
National Assembly towards Gaehwa	Line 9	Saetgang towards VHS Medical Center
Dangsan towards Gimpo International Airport	Line 9 Express	Noryangjin towards VHS Medical Center
Location

Yeouido station is a subway station on Line 5 and Line 9 of the Seoul Subway system. It is one of the stations that serve the eponymous island of Yeouido, one of Seoul's financial hubs. The large Yeouido Park is close to this station.

A new subway line starting from Yeouido broke ground in December 2011 heading south.

In 2023, the new subway line will be extended to Ansan in southwest Gyeonggi Province. Travel time from Yeouido to Ansan is expected to take only around 30 minutes.

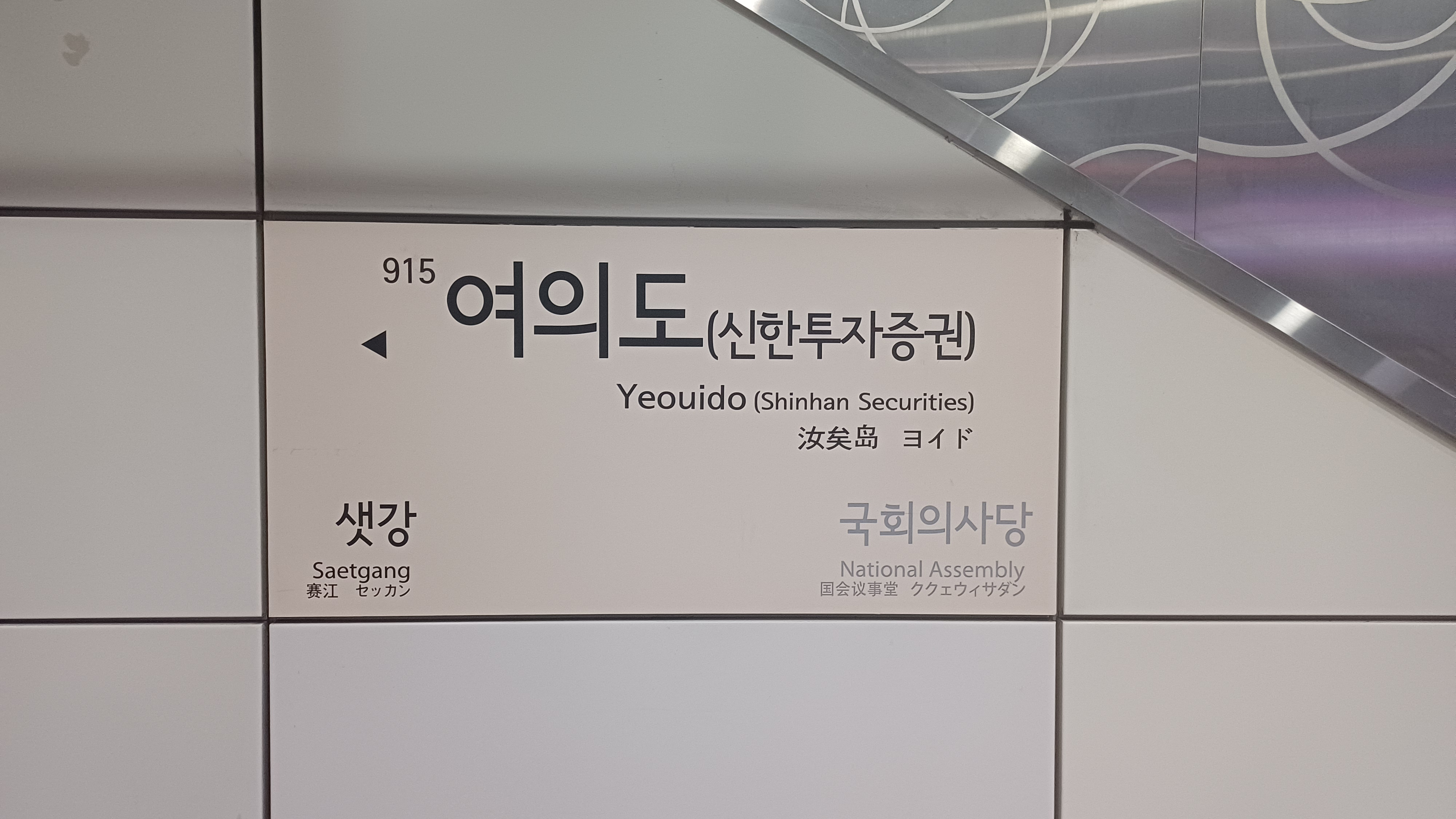
Station sign (Line 9)

== Station layout ==
G	Street level	Exit

L1; Concourse	Lobby	Customer Service, Shops, Vending machines, ATMs

L2; Line 5 platforms	Side platform, doors will open on the right
L2; Line 5 platforms	Westbound	← Line 5 toward Banghwa (Singil)
L2; Line 5 platforms	Eastbound	Line 5 toward Hanam Geomdansan or Macheon (Yeouinaru)→
L2; Line 5 platforms	Side platform, doors will open on the right

L3; Line 9 platforms	Side platform, doors will open on the right
L3; Line 9 platforms	Westbound	← Line 9 Local toward Gaehwa (Nat'l Assembly) ← Line 9 Express toward Gimpo International Airport (Dangsan)
L3; Line 9 platforms	Eastbound	Line 9 Local toward VHS Medical Center (Saetgang) → Line 9 Express toward VHS Medical Center (Noryangjin) →
L3; Line 9 platforms	Side platform, doors will open on the right

== Vicinity ==
- Exit 1: Gwangjang APT
- Exit 2: Financial Supervisory Service, KT
- Exit 3: National Assembly of South Korea, Yeouido Park, Korean Broadcasting System (KBS)
- Exit 4: Small Business Corporation
- Exit 5: Korea Exchange, Munhwa Broadcasting Corporation (MBC)
- Exit 6: Yunjung Elementary School, Yunjung Middle School, Yeouido Saetgang Ecological Park

== Attractions ==
- IFC Seoul: IFC Office Towers, IFC Mall Seoul and Conrad Seoul Hotel. The station is connected to the complex by a moving walkway, and is approximately two kilometers from Line 5.

== Gallery ==
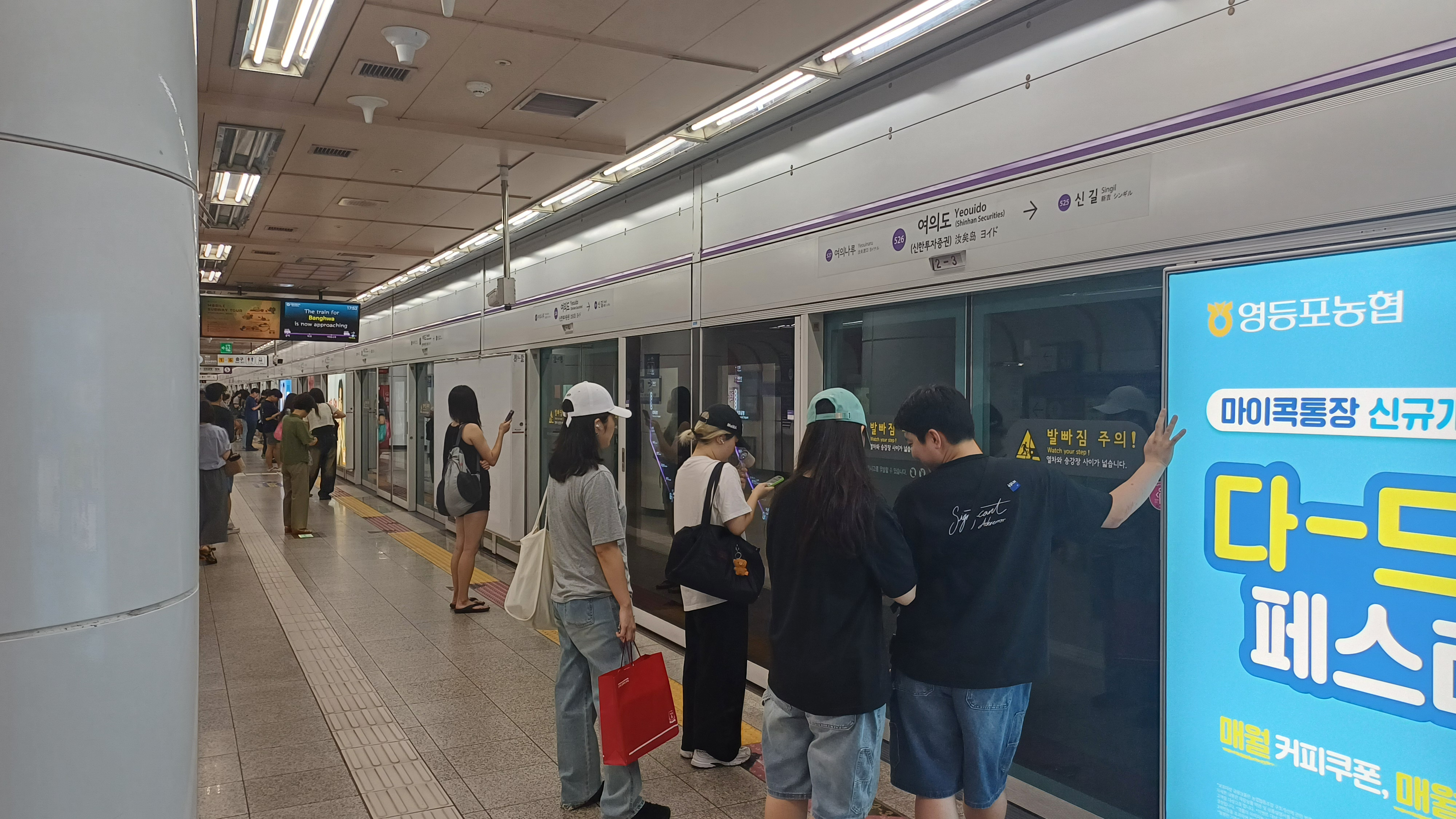
Line 5 platform

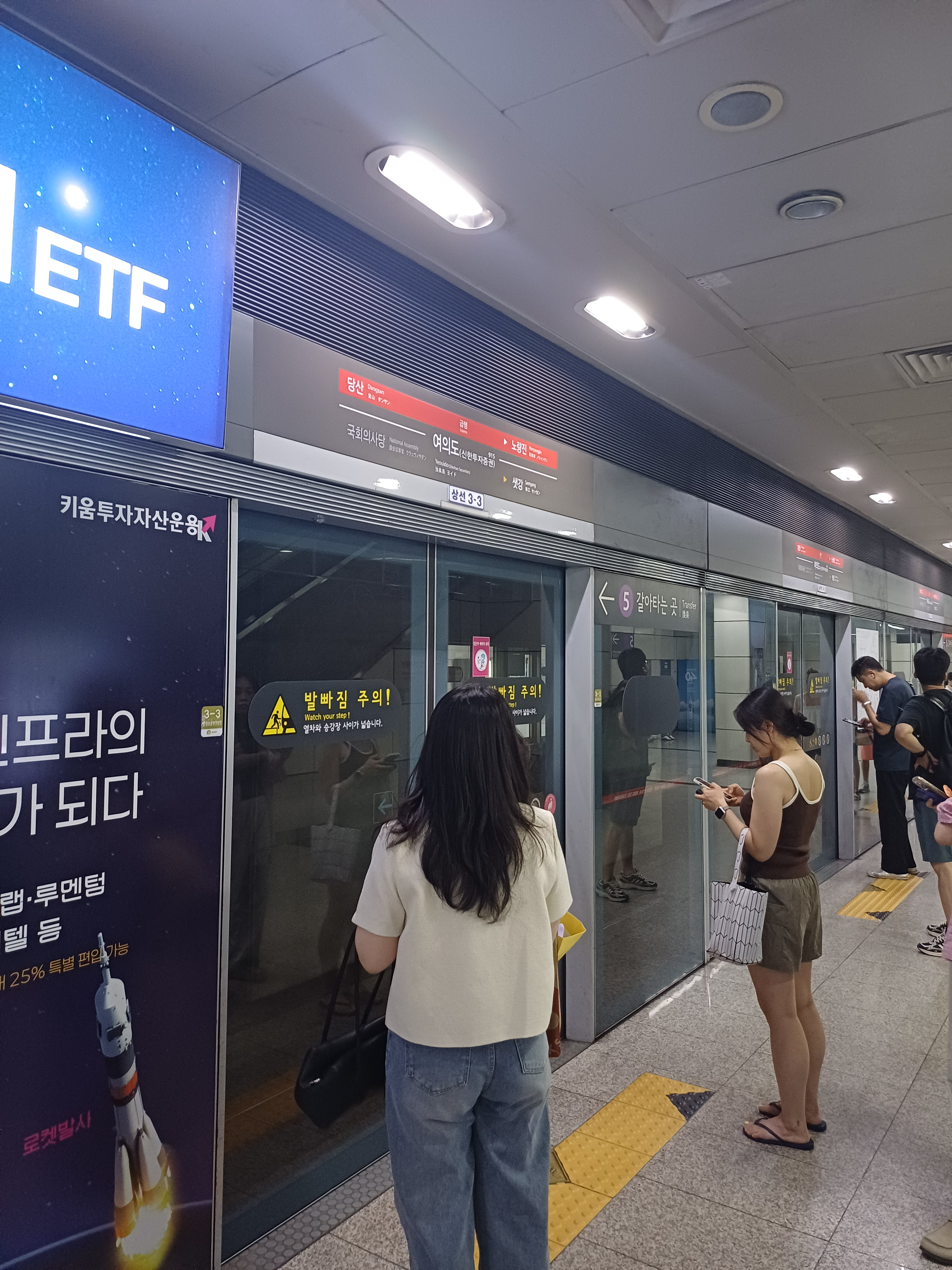
Line 9 platform
