= Daerim-dong =

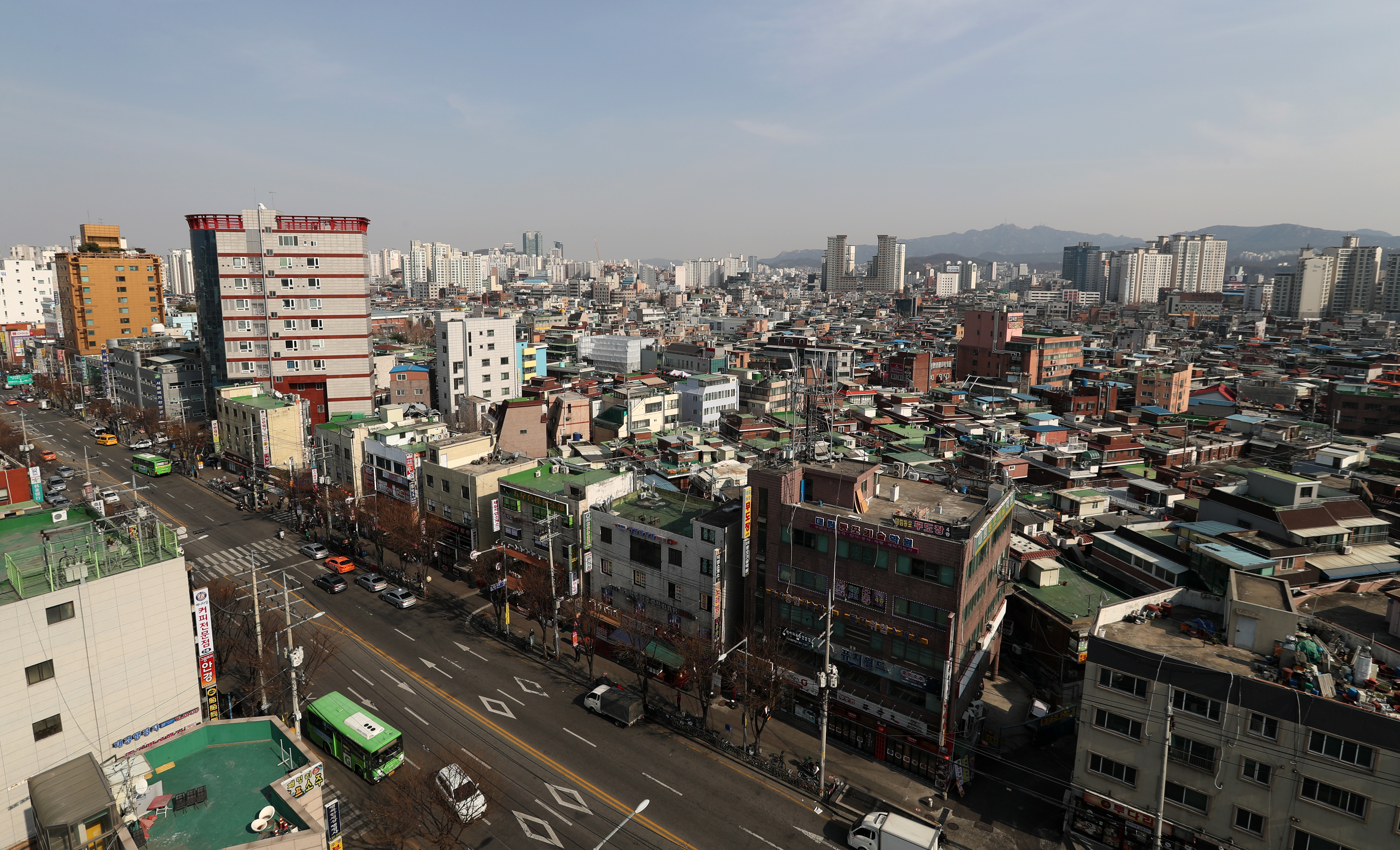
- Interactive map of Daerim-dong
- Country: South Korea

Area
  - Total: 2.04 km^{2} (0.79 sq mi)

Population (2001)
  - Total: 81,561
  - Density: 40,000/km^{2} (104,000/sq mi)

Korean name
- Hangul: 대림동
- Hanja: 大林洞
- RR: Daerim-dong
- MR: Taerim-dong

Daerim-dong (Korean: 대림동) is a dong (neighborhood) of Yeongdeungpo District, Seoul, South Korea.

== Overview ==
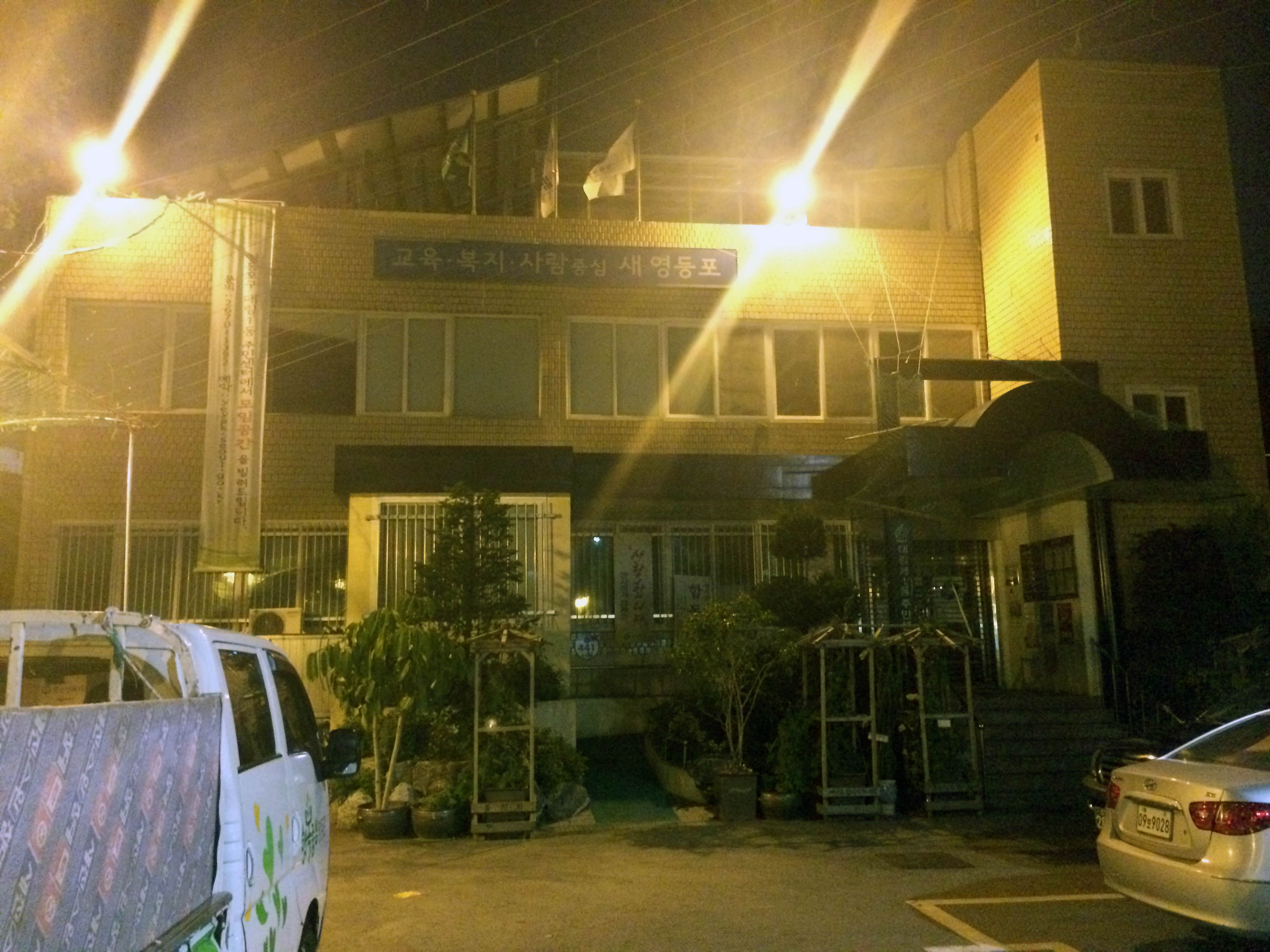
Daerim 1-dong Community Service Centre (Yeongdeungpo District)

The name "Daerim" is a combination of characters from neighboring areas, Sindae-dong and Sindorim-dong. Contrary to its name, Daerim-dong was not historically a forested area but rather a grassy field and pastureland along the Dorimcheon stream.

During the Joseon period, it was part of Geumcheonhyeon Sangbuk-myeon Wonjimok-ri. Over the years, it went through various administrative changes, belonging to different regions and counties. In 1949, it became part of Seoul as Sindorim-dong in Yeongdeungpo District. In 1955, the administrative district of Daerim-dong was established, governing the legal districts of Sindorim-dong and Sindae-dong.

Subsequent changes in district names and boundaries led to the designation of the remaining area of Sindorim-dong in Yeongdeungpo District as the legal district of Daerim-dong, which remains unchanged to this day.

== See also ==
- Administrative divisions of South Korea
