= National Assembly station =

Metro station in South Korea

Coordinates: 37°31′43″N 126°55′03″E

국회의사당 (한국산업은행); National Assembly (Korea Development Bank)
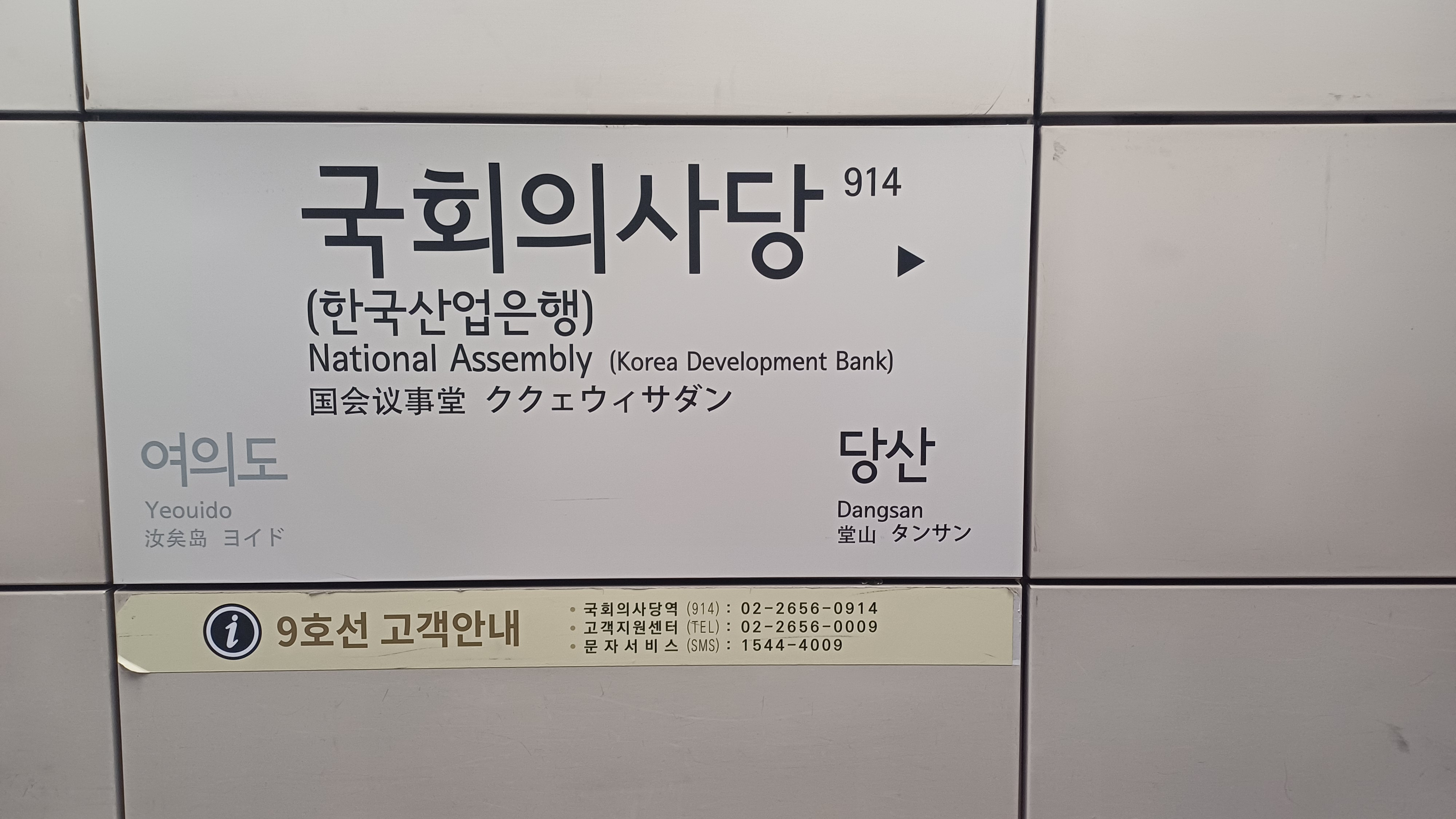
- Station Sign

Korean name
- Hangul: 국회의사당역
- Hanja: 國會議事堂驛
- Revised Romanization: Gukhoeuisadang-yeok
- McCune–Reischauer: Kukhoeŭisadang-yŏk

General information
- Location: 17-1 Yeouido-dong; Yeongdeungpo-gu, Seoul
- Operator: Seoul Metro Line 9 Corporation
- Line: Line 9
- Platforms: 1 island platform
- Tracks: 2

Construction
- Structure type: Underground

History
- Opened: July 24, 2009
Location

National Assembly station is a railway station on Line 9 of the Seoul Subway.

National Assembly station is located near the National Assembly Building, where plenary sessions of the National Assembly of South Korea are held.

== Station layout ==
G	Street level	Exit

L1; Concourse	Lobby	Customer Service, Shops, Vending machines, ATMs

L2; Platform level	Side platform, doors will open on the right
L2; Platform level	Westbound	← Line 9 Local toward Gaehwa (Dangsan) ← Line 9 Express does not stop here
L2; Platform level	Eastbound	Line 9 Local toward VHS Medical Center (Yeouido) → Line 9 Express does not stop here →
L2; Platform level	Side platform, doors will open on the right

== Places of interest ==
- National Assembly of South Korea, KBS Open Hall, KBS Building

Preceding station	Seoul Metropolitan Subway	Following station
Dangsan towards Gaehwa	Line 9	Yeouido towards VHS Medical Center
