= Yeongdeungpo District =

District of Seoul, South Korea

Yeongdeungpo
- Autonomous District
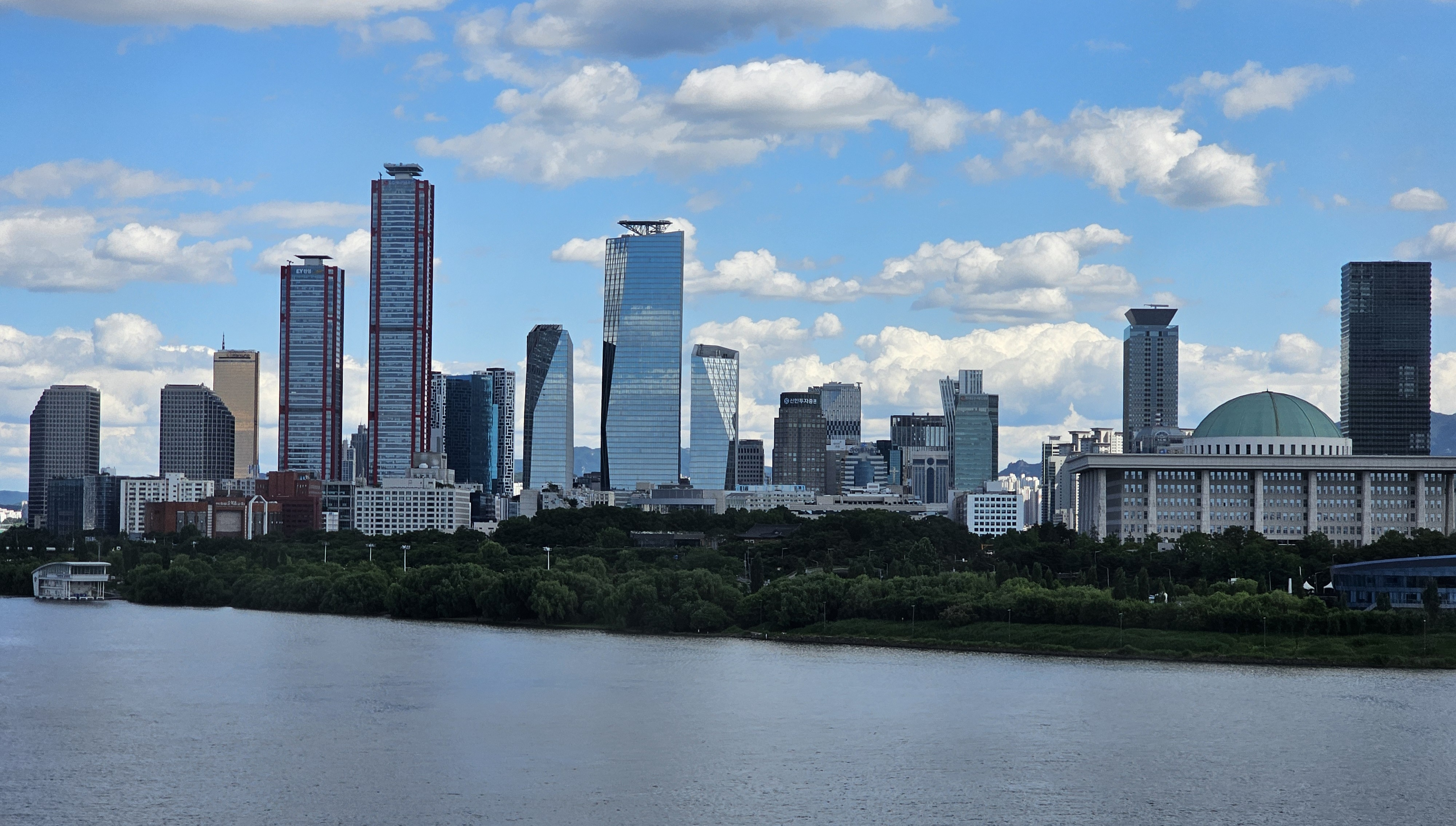
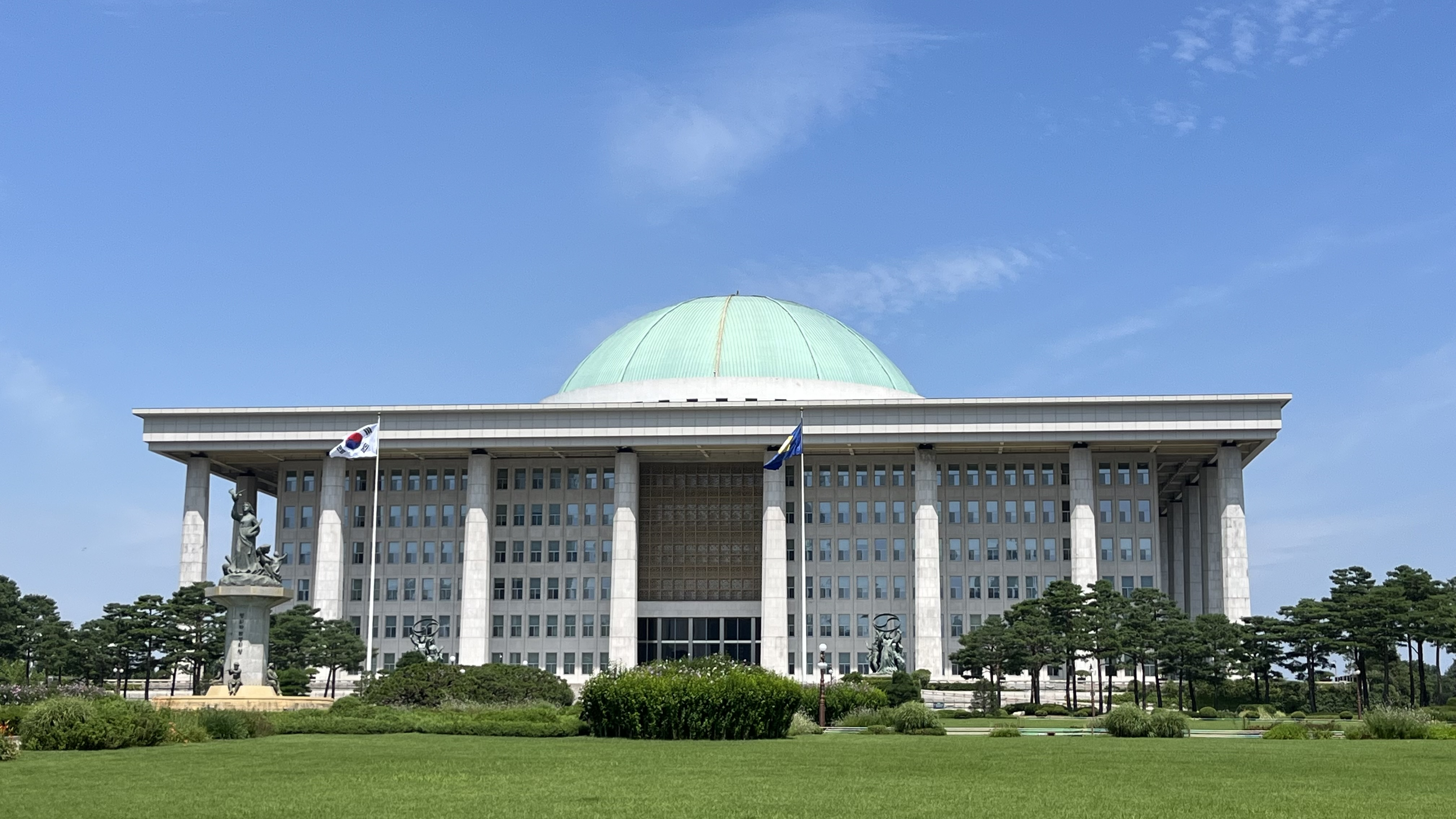
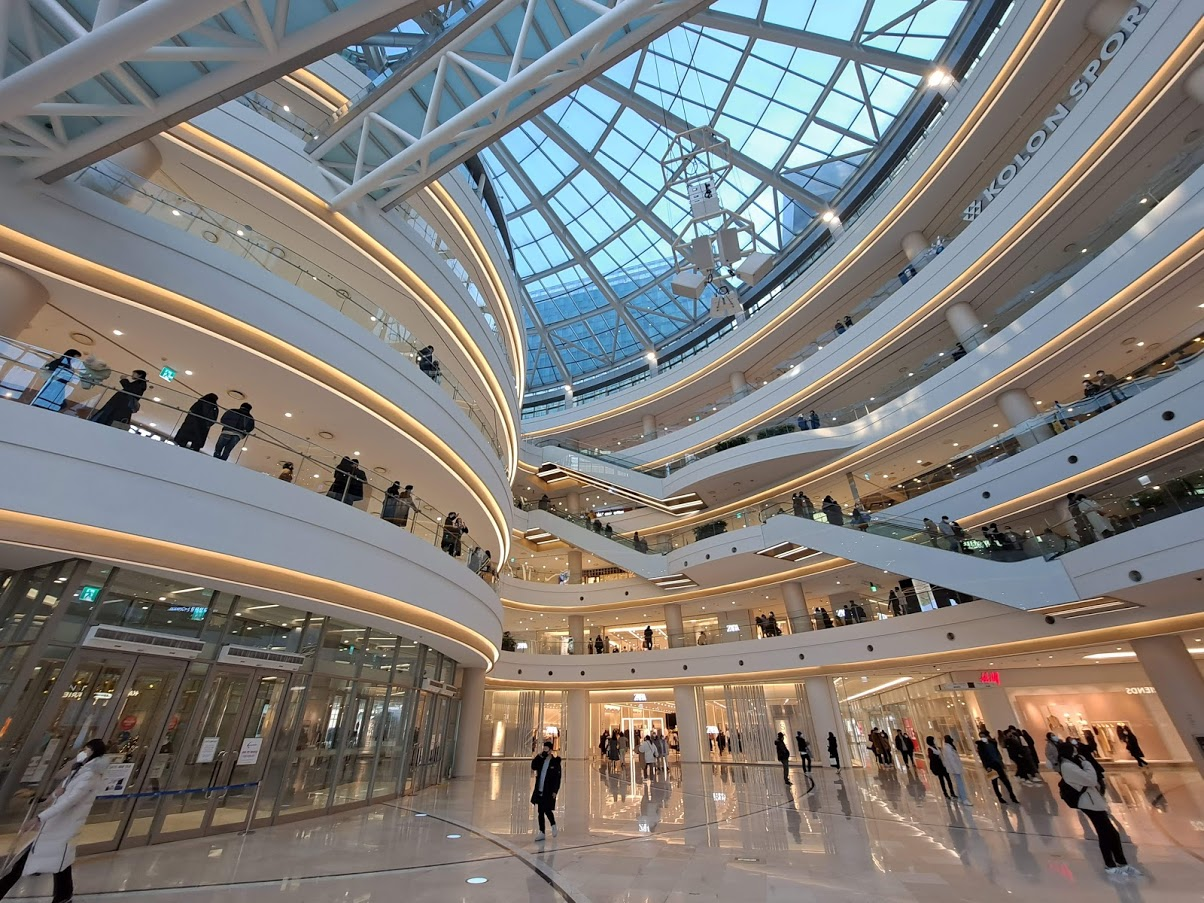
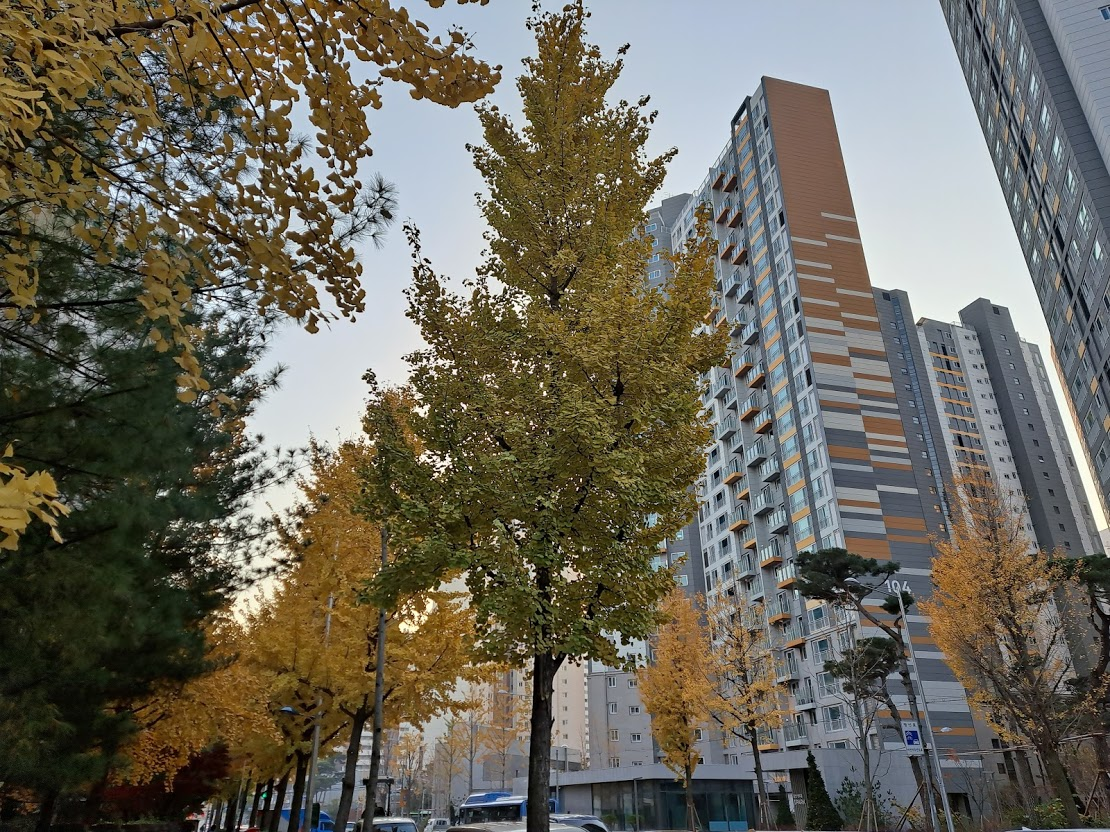
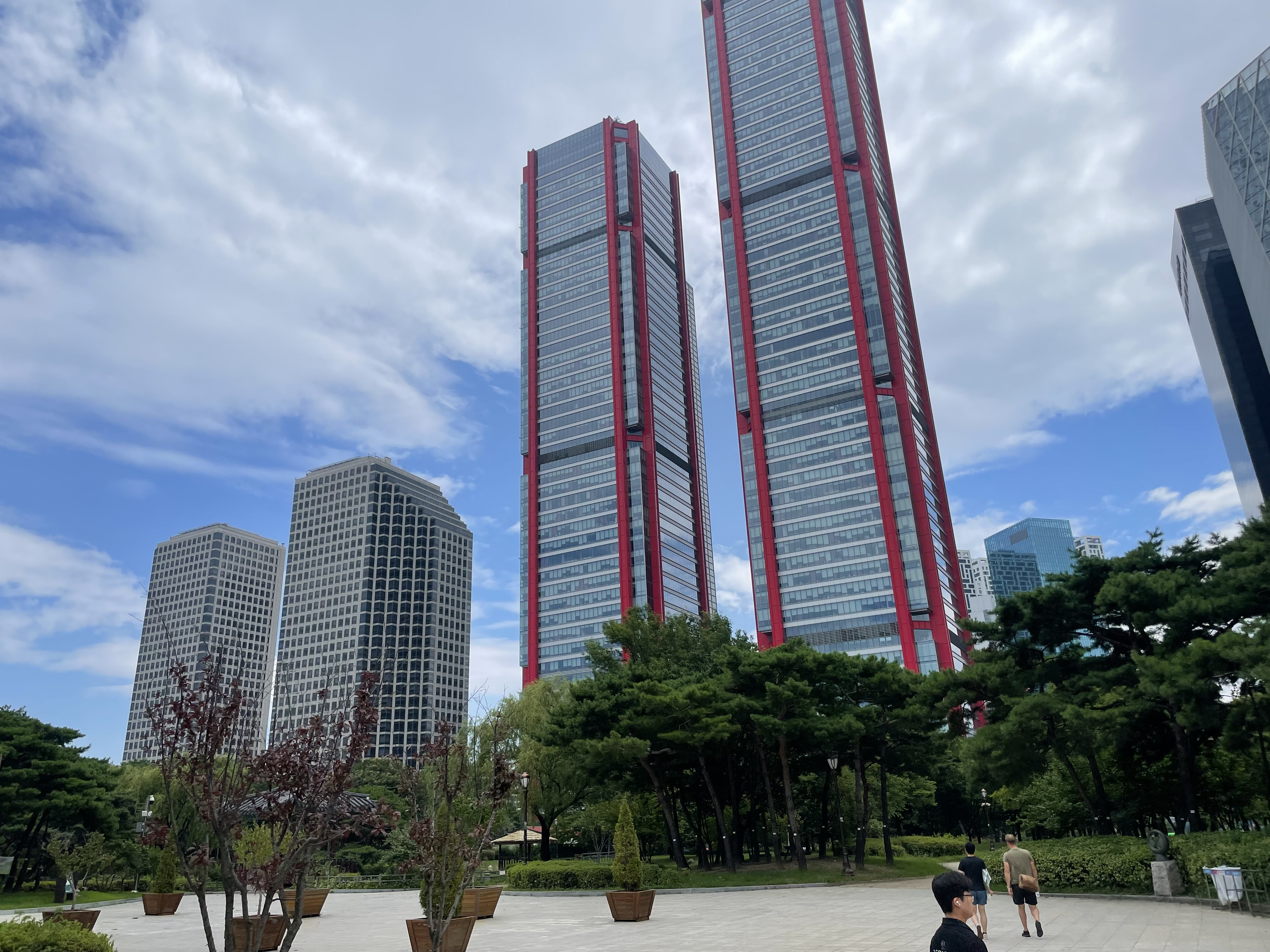
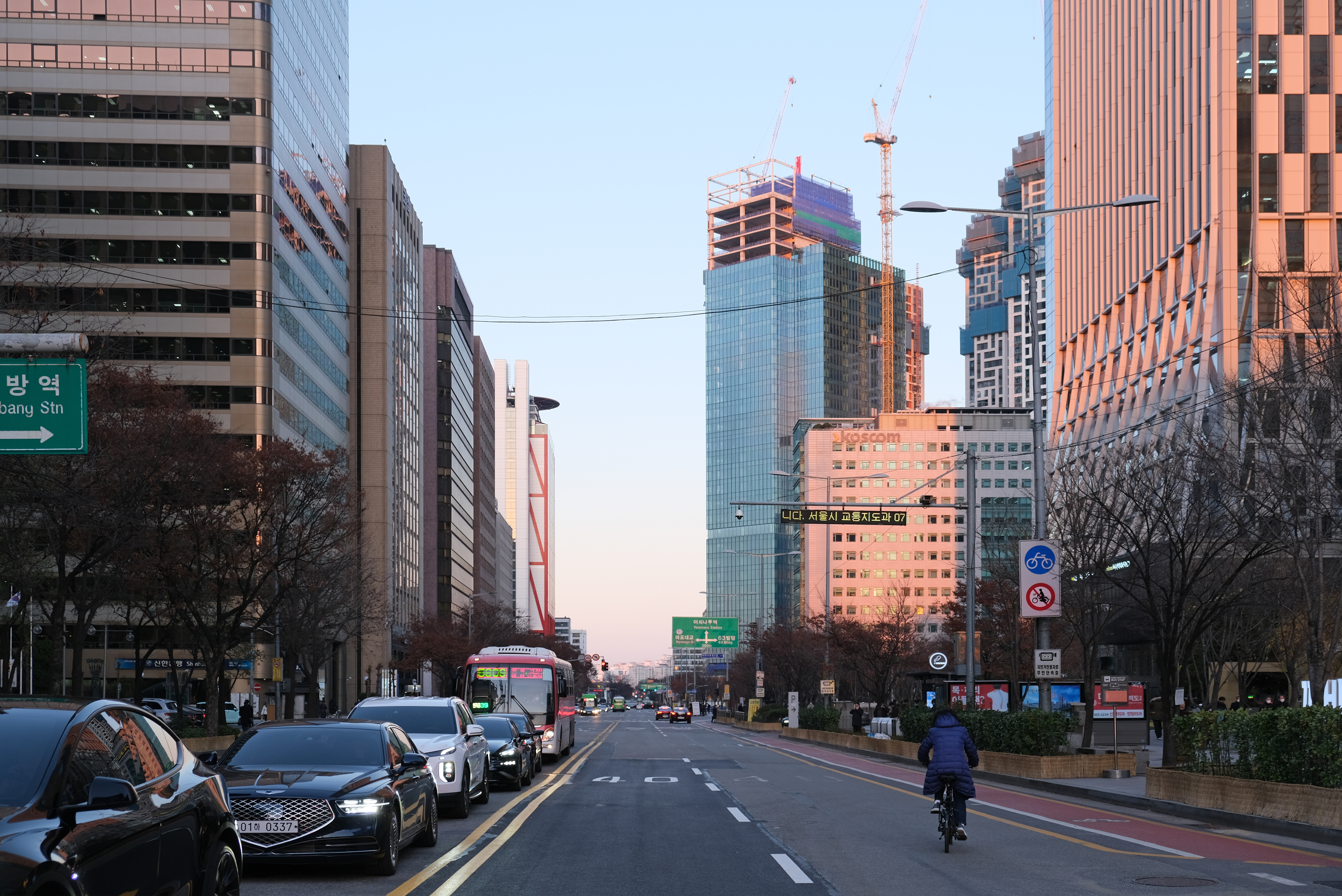
- Yeouido National Assembly of Korea Times Square Mall Dangsan-dong apartments Parc1 Yeouinaru-do

- Flag

- Location of Yeongdeungpo District in Seoul
- Coordinates: 37°31′35″N 126°53′47″E
- Country: South Korea
- Region: Sudogwon
- Special City: Seoul
- Administrative dong: 22

Government
  - Body: Yeongdeungpo-gu Council
  - Mayor: Cho Yu-jin (Democratic)
  - MNAs: List of MNAs: Kim Young-joo (People Power); Kim Min-seok (Democratic)

Area
  - Total: 24.56 km^{2} (9.48 sq mi)

Population (2010)
  - Total: 396,243
  - Density: 16,130/km^{2} (41,790/sq mi)
- Time zone: UTC+9 (Korea Standard Time)
- Postal code.: 07200 – 07499
- Area code(s): +82-2-2600,800,780~
- Website: Yeongdeungpo District official website

Korean name
- Hangul: 영등포구
- Hanja: 永登浦區
- RR: Yeongdeungpo-gu
- MR: Yŏngdŭngp'o-gu

Yeongdeungpo District (Korean: 영등포구) is one of the 25 districts of Seoul, South Korea. Although the origin of the name is uncertain, the first two syllables are thought to be from "yeongdeung" (靈登) or "divine ascent", a shamanic rite. The third syllable is "po", representing the bank of a river (浦), referring to the district's position on the Han River. The 2006 population was 408,819.

There are 22 administrative dong and 34 legal dong. Yeouido-dong is the largest in area and takes up about 34% of the land. The total area is 24.56 km^{2} (9.48 sq mi) (2004), making up 4% of Seoul's land. The annual budget is approximately 2 billion won.

Yeongdeungpo District has been heavily developed as an office, commercial, and residential district. Yeouido Dong is home to DLI 63 Building, the highest office building in South Korea and currently the 3rd tallest building in the country. The National Assembly Building is located in Yeouido-dong. Other organisations, such as the Financial Union of Korea are also based in Yeongdeungpo. There are also mass-media corporations in the area, including Kookmin Newspaper Corporation, Munhwa Broadcasting Corporation, and Korean Broadcasting System.

== History ==
The earliest historical references to Yeongdeungpo were in the 1870s when it was considered to be the main port used in the defence of the city of Seoul.

The opening of the Gyeongin Line in 1899 and the Gyeongbu Line 1905, the County Office of Siheung-gun was relocated to Yeongdeungpo and area became a major hub for transportation and commerce.

Except for Yeouido and Yanghwa-dong, Yeongdeungpo belonged to old Siheung County. In 1936, Yeongdeungpo (except for today's Daerim-dong) was annexed to Gyeongseong (today's Seoul). In 1949, some parts of Siheung County were ceded to Yeongdeungpo District of Seoul. These sections are today's Guro-dong, Sindorim-dong, Daerim-dong and Sindaebang-dong. It is one of the sub-centers of Seoul, and the Seoul Metropolitan Subway Line 1 passes. Among the areas south of the Han River in present-day Seoul, it was the first (1936) to be incorporated into Seoul.

On January 1, 1963, some areas of Bucheon County were combined to Yeongdeungpo District as below.

Old district		New district	
Ojeong myeon	Ogok-ri and Osoe-ri	Yeongdeungpo District, Seoul	Ogok-ri, Osoe-ri, Hang-ri, Onsu-ri, Gung-ri, Cheonwang-ri, Oryu-ri, Gaebong-ri and Gocheok-ri
Sosa-eup	Hang-ri, Onsu-ri, Gung-ri, Cheonwang-ri, Oryu-ri, Gaebong-ri and Gocheok-ri	Yeongdeungpo District, Seoul	Ogok-ri, Osoe-ri, Hang-ri, Onsu-ri, Gung-ri, Cheonwang-ri, Oryu-ri, Gaebong-ri and Gocheok-ri

Also, many parts of Siheung County were merged into this district at the same time.

During the post-Korean War industrialization period the district's economy and population grew dramatically and as a result sections of the district were broken up to form new districts – Gwanak District being established in 1973, Gangseo-gu in 1977, and Guro District in 1980.

== Administration ==
=== Administrative divisions ===
Administrative divisions

Yeongdeungpo District is divided into the following "dong"s.

- Dangsan-dong (당산동; 堂山洞) (divided into Dangsan 1 and 2-dong)
- Daerim-dong (대림동; 大林洞) (divided into Daerim 1, 2, and 3-dong)
- Dorim-dong (도림동; 道林洞) (Dorim 1 and 2-dong were combined in September 2008)
- Mullae-dong (문래동; 文來洞) (divided into Mullae 1 and 2-dong)
- Singil-dong (신길동; 新吉洞) (divided into Singil 1 to 7-dong)
- Yangpyeong-dong (양평동; 楊坪洞) (divided into Yangpyeong 1 and 2-dong)
  - Yanghwa-dong (양화동; 楊花洞)
- Yeongdeungpo-dong (영등포동; 永登浦洞) (divided into Yeongdeungpo-dong and Yeongdeungpobon-dong (영등포본동; 永登浦本洞)
- Yeouido-dong (여의도동; 汝矣島洞)

=== Local government ===
Yeongdeungpo District office (영등포구청) is located immediately adjacent to Yeongdeungpo District office station on Seoul Metro Line 2.

== Economy ==
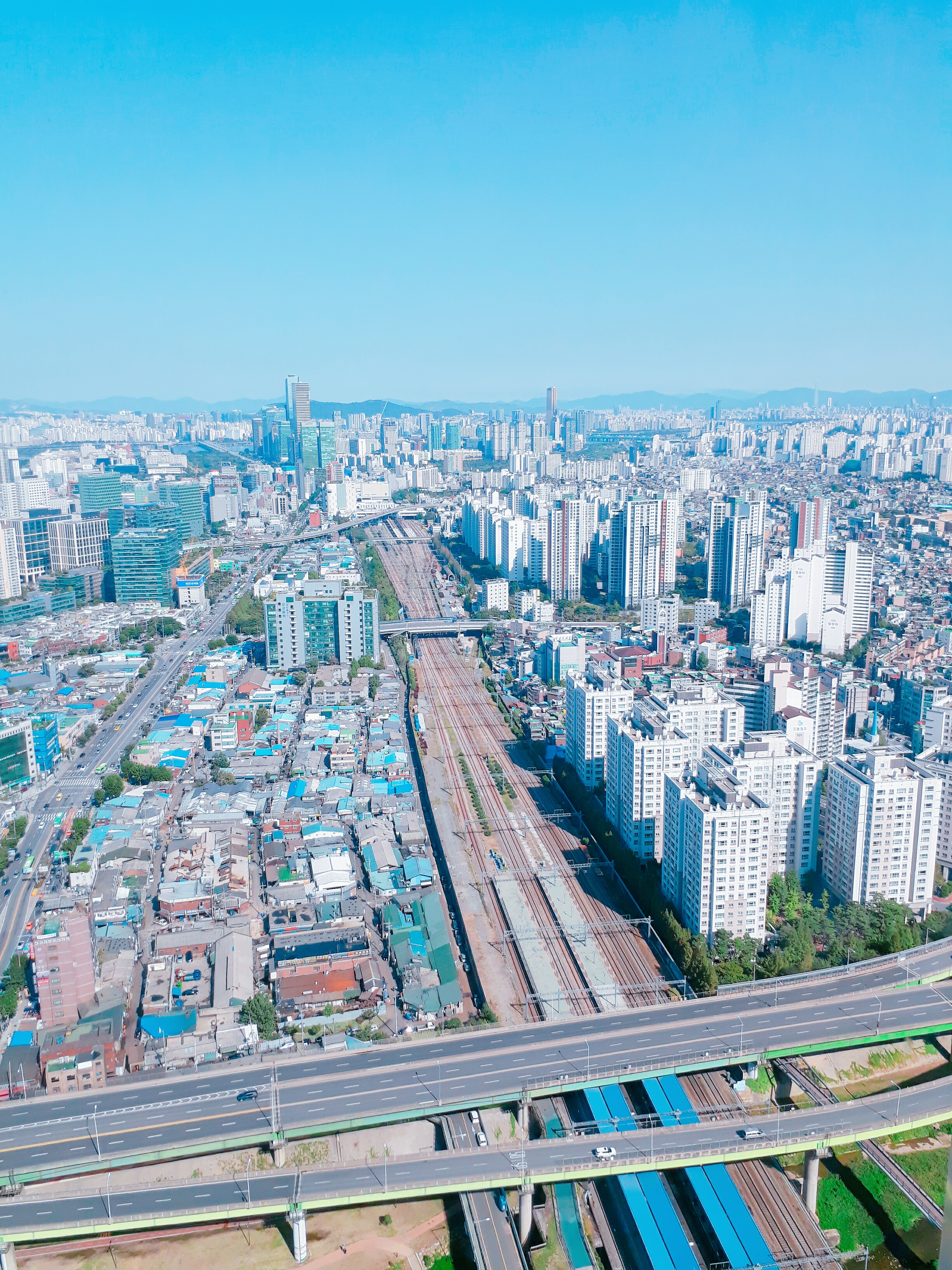
Aerial view of Yeongdeungpo District

For several decades, Yeouido in Yeongdeungpo district has been considered the financial center of Seoul. This reputation was stimulated by the relocation of the Korean main bourse, the Korea Exchange (KRX), from Myeongdong to Yeouido in 1979. Among the 291 head offices of financial institutions located in Seoul, 93 are based in Yeouido, Yeongdeungpo. Notably, 42 out of 68 asset management companies and 8 out of 11 futures companies have their head offices in Yeouido. These include Mirae Asset Group, Korea Life Insurance, KDB, Korea Investment Holdings and many more. Korea Exchange was originally located in Yeouido, but it moved to Busan in 2009. Korea Financial Investment Association is still based in Yeouido. The Korea Financial Services Commission (FSC) and the Financial Supervisory Service (FSS) are also based in Yeouido. Despite its popularity with Korean financial institutions, Yeouido has proved less popular with foreign entities who tend to prefer the Jongno district.

Other notable companies based in Yeongdeungpo include Lotte Confectionery, Hanjin Shipping, LG Corp., and Keoyang Shipping are headquartered in Yeouido-dong in Yeongdeungpo District.

Historically, Yeongdeungpo district has been dominated by the manufacturing industry and remnants of this are clearly visible around the district with small workshops and larger factories located next to modern developments, especially in Mullae-dong.

== Landmarks and attractions ==
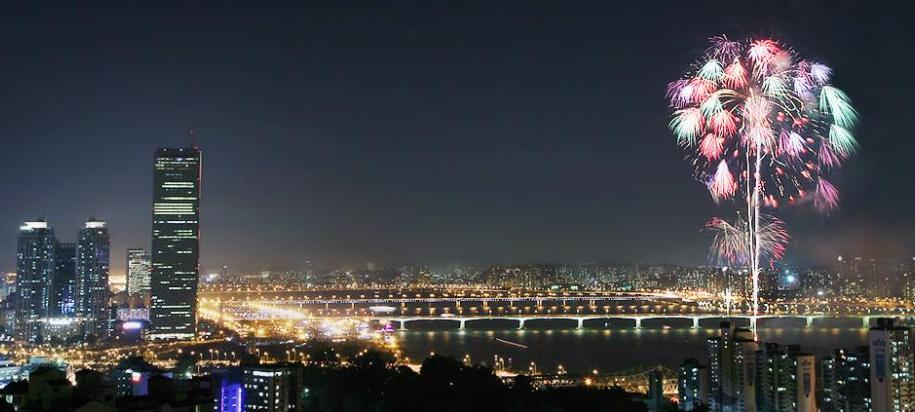
63 Building (left) and the Han River

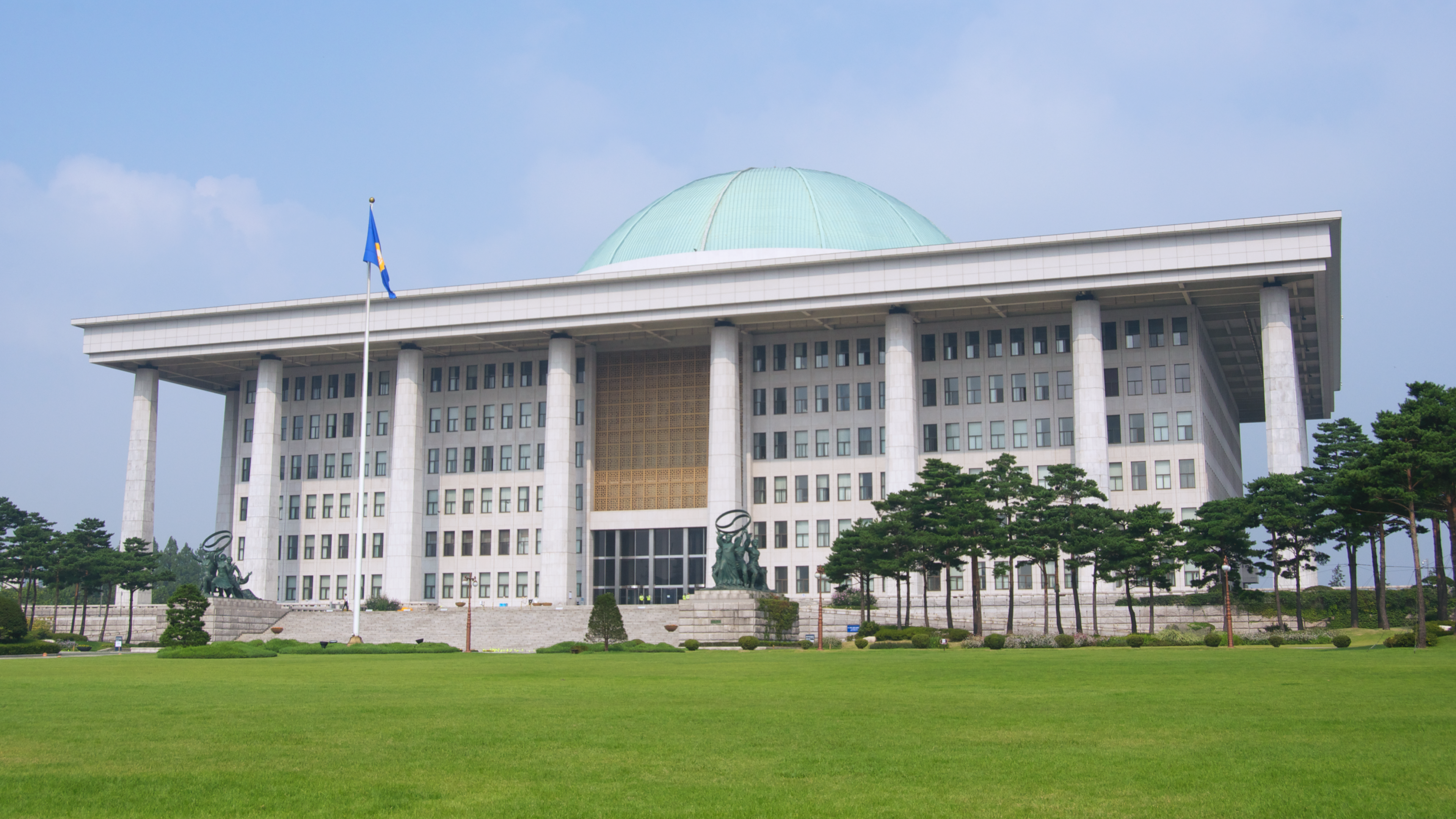
The Korean National Assembly Building

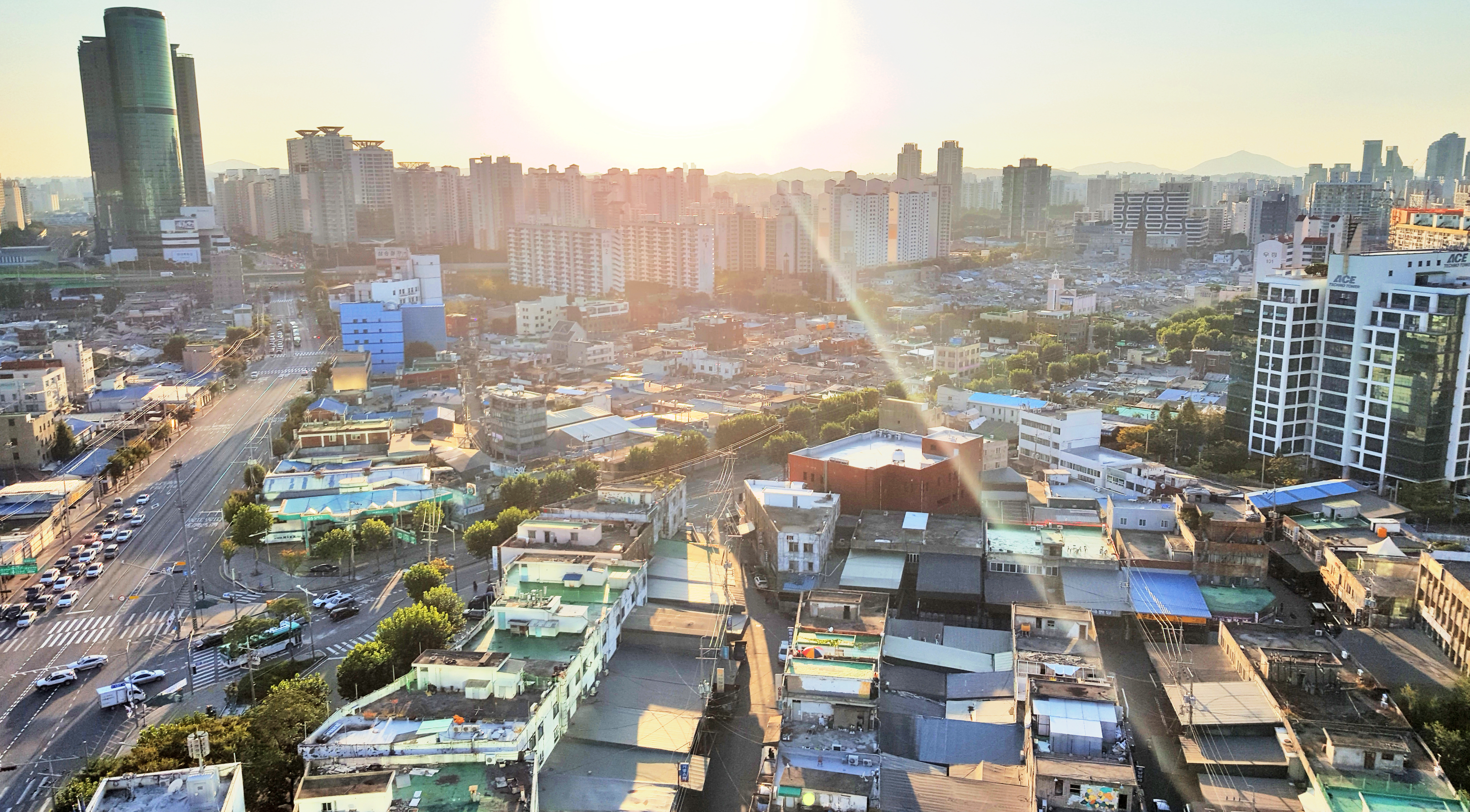
Mullae-dong

=== Times Square ===
Times Square is a large shopping mall located closed to Yeongdeungpo station and connected to an adjoining Shinsegae department store which in turns is connected to Yeongdeungpo station. It is one of Seoul's largest shopping malls, featuring the CGV Starium, the world's largest permanent 35 mm cinema screen. Construction of Times Square started in 2006 on the site of a former Kyungbang plant in Yeongdeungpo, and lasted for three years. The construction cost a total of 600 billion won. On September 16, 2009, the mall officially opened, welcoming an average of 210,000 people per day.

=== Yeouido ===
Yeouido is home to many of Korea's tallest skyscrapers. One of the oldest and most well-known is the 63 Building, located on the eastern side of Yeouido. It was opened in 1985 to coincide with the Seoul Olympics in 1988 and intended to demonstrate Korea's economic success. The building is 250 m (820 ft) tall and was the tallest building in the country until 2003. The 60th floor houses the world's highest art gallery while the 63rd floor contains an observation deck known as the 63 Golden Tower. The 58th and 59th floors both feature restaurants. The lower floors house an indoor shopping mall with approximately 90 stores, an IMAX theater, and a large aquarium. A convention center and banquet hall are also housed within the building.

Also within Yeouido is the International Finance Center (IFC). The IFC was opened in 2012 and includes the office towers, Conrad Hotel and the IFC Mall. The IFC mall hosts a large number of shops including major international brands. The center of the mall includes a large atrium with glass pavilion which extends above ground level. The mall itself occupies four floors below ground.

Parc1 tower is the newest development in Yeouido with its primary feature being the 334 tall main tower. The development features 2 main office towers, a Fairmont Hotel (due to open in 2021) and a Hyundai Department Store (due to open in 2020 but pushed back to 2021). Hyundai have indicated that they will open an Amazon Go store with the department store, one of the first outside the US.

Yeouido is also home to the Korean National Assembly Building which opened in 1975. South Korea's unicameral legislature meets within the building and numerous of buildings and institutions associated with the assembly are located nearby.

The Korean Broadcasting System(KBS) New Wing Open Hall is located in Yeouido-dong. It is the broadcast and recording centre of many KBS programmes with a studio audience, namely the live weekly music show Music Bank.

In 2017 the Seoul Museum of Art (SeMA) and the Seoul Metropolitan Government opened SeMA Bunker, a museum occupying a previously undiscovered military bunker in Yeouido. The bunker was discovered in 2005 during groundwork for a bus transfer station. No official records of the bunker have been found but historians believe it was constructed for Park Chung Hee in 1976–1977 because large-scale military parades took place above the bunker on May 16 Square (now Yeouido Park).

=== Mullae Art Village ===
Mullae-dong was previously a successful industrial area developed in the 1960s as industry left the Cheonggyecheon in Jongno District and relocated to Mullae-dong. However, the growth of industry in the area declined in the 1990s as the Asian Financial Crisis had a considerable effect on the South Korean economy. In the 2000s, the availability of empty commercial buildings attracted artists to the area and in 2013 the Korean government officially supported to the concept. Mullae Art Village has become a popular leisure destination and is home to a large number of eateries, bars and other related venues, as well as a considerable number of workshops which are still in operation.

== Green space ==
There are several major green spaces within Yeongdeungpo district. Yeouido is home to two of them – Yeouido Han River Park, which is a popular leisure and tourist destination, and Yeouido Park which runs through the center of Yeouido. Yeouido Han River Park hosts several major festivals including the Spring Flower (cherry blossom) Festival, the Seoul International Fireworks Festival and the Hangang Summer Festival. Yeouido Park was previous an airport that existed until the 1970s when it was turned into an asphalt plaza and named May 16 Square in reference to the coup led by Park Chung Hee in 1961. In 1984 Pope John Paul II led a canonization mass at the park. In 1999 the park was returned to its natural state and opened to the public.

Yeongdeungpo district also features the lower section of Anyangcheon (shared with Yangcheon District).

== Transportation ==
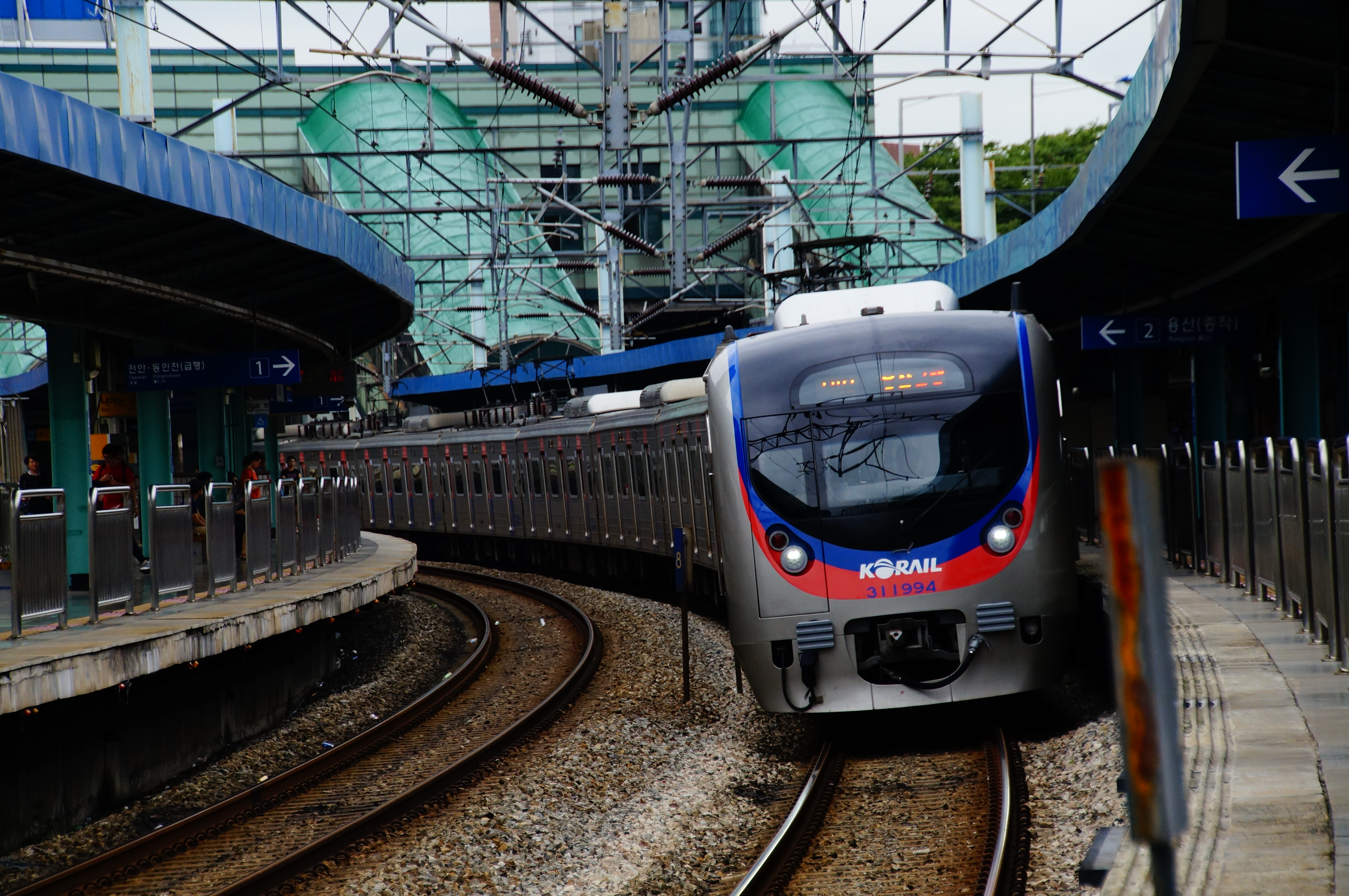
Line 1 train at Singil station

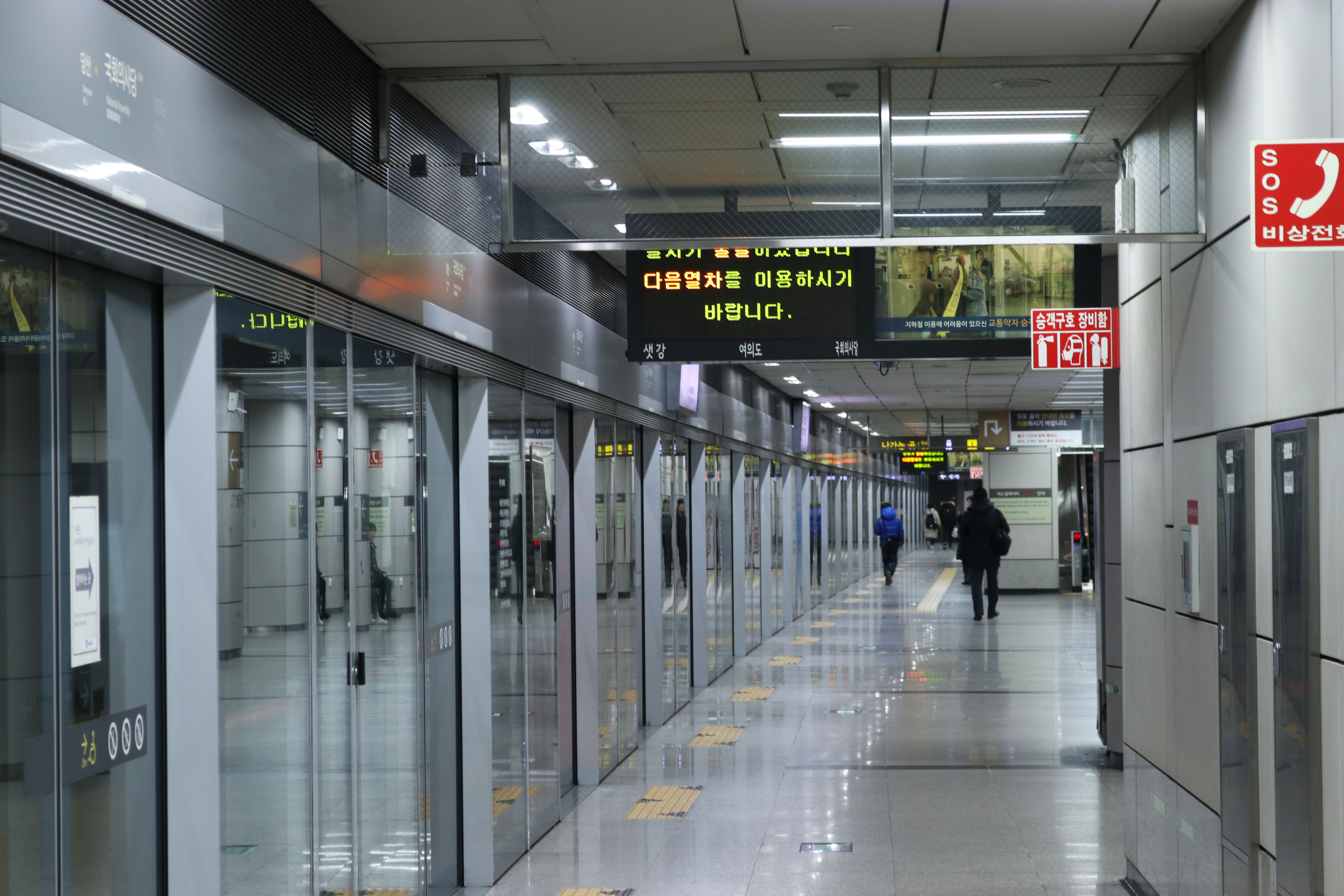
National Assembly station on Line 9

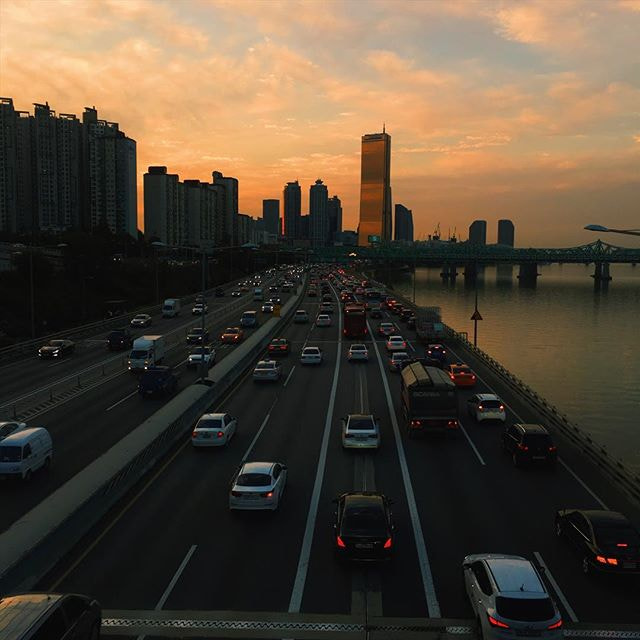
Olympic-Daero and Yeouido in the background

=== Railroad ===
Yeongdeungpo district is served by the Gyeongbu Line which runs through the center of the district with trains calling at Yeongdeungpo station. Services include Korail KTX, ITX, Mungunghwa and tourist trains. The Gyeongbu line is considered to be one of the most important rail lines in Korea and its strategic importance goes back to the early 20th century during the Japanese occupation period. Yeongdeungpo station is the last station within Seoul and since 1974 the Gyeongbu line and Seoul Metro Line 1 tracks have been integrated and electrified up until Yeongdeungpo station (further electrification of the line southwards took place in later years).

- Gyeongbu Line

(Gwangmyeong station) ← Yeongdeungpo station → (Yongsan station)

=== GTX ===
Great Train Express (GTX) is a planned higher-speed commuter rail network in the Seoul Capital Area project consisting of three separate lines, named GTX A, GTX B and GTX C, and scheduled for completion in 2025. As currently planned (2021), GTX B will connect Songdo in Incheon with Maseok in Namyangju, with trains calling at eleven stations in between including Yeouido. According to the Korean government, GTX B will be completed in 2021.

- GTX B

(Sindorim station) ← Yeouido station → (Yongsan station)

=== Metro ===
The oldest subway line in Korea, Line 1, runs through the center of Yeongdeungpo District, serving Yeongdeungpo station, Singil Station & Deabang Station. The line first opened in 1974 as the Korean National Railroad of Seoul with through services to national mainline railways from Seongbuk station (now: Kwangwoon University station) to Incheon and Suwon Stations. Prior to 2000, the underground section of Line 1 between Seoul Station and Cheongnyangni Station was colored red on metro maps while the above-ground section was colored gray or blue. After 2000, the service was combined and colored dark blue. On average, trains run every six to nine minutes on the section between Seoul Station and Guro (the section serving Yeongdeungpo station).

- Seoul Subway Line 1

(Dongjak-gu) ← Daebang — Singil — Yeongdeungpo → (Guro-gu)

- Seoul Metro

- Seoul Subway Line 2 Euljiro Circle Line

(Guro-gu) ← Mullae — Yeongdeungpo-gu Office — Dangsan → (Mapo-gu)

- Seoul Subway Line 5

(Yangcheon-gu) ← Yangpyeong — Yeongdeungpo-gu Office — Yeongdeungpo Market — Singil — Yeouido — Yeouinaru → (Mapo-gu)

- Seoul Subway Line 7

(Dongjak-gu) ← Boramae — Sinpung — Daerim → (Guro-gu)

- Seoul Metro Line 9 Corporation

- Seoul Subway Line 9

(Yangcheon-gu) ← Seonyudo — Dangsan — National Assembly — Yeouido — Saetgang → (Dongjak-gu)

=== Future metro services ===
In addition to the existing subway services, two additional lines are currently under development. The Sillim Line is currently under construction and will connect Saetgang and Daebang in Yeongdeungpo district with stations in Dongjak District and Gwanak District with the final station at Seoul National University. Another line, the Mokdong Line, is also under development with construction due to commence in 2021. The Mokdong Line will connect Dangsan Station with stations in Yangcheon District, the final station being Sinwol Station.

=== Buses ===
Yeongdeungpo District is served by all types of buses operated in Seoul and its environs: green (local), blue (city), red (express) and white/green (Gyeonnggi). Gyeongin-ro, a major thoroughfare running from the south west to the north east, is a major bus route connecting the district with Incheon, Bucheon, Gwangmyeong and elsewhere. Gyeongin-ro links with Yeouiseo-ro/Yeoui-daero at Yeouido on which there is a large bus transfer center located in front of the IFC mall.

=== Highways ===
Olympic-daero (also known as Olympic Boulevard) runs alongside the south bank of the Han River and through Yeongdeungpo District. Construction of the road began in 1982 and was completed in 1986. The eight-lane highway is 40.67 km (25.27 mi) long and connects Yeongdeungpo with Incheon and Gimpo international airports as well as Gangnam and Songpa in the east.

== Education ==
=== Universities ===
- Seoul Sports Graduate University
- Berea International Theological Seminary

=== High schools ===
- Janghun High School
- Hangang Media High School
- Seonyu High School
- Yeongdeungpo Girls' High School
- Youngshin High School
- Yeouido Girls' High School
- Yeouido High School
- Daeyoung High School
- Gwanak High School

=== Middle schools ===
- Yeouido Middle School
- Munrae Middle School
- Seonyu Middle School
- Yoon Middle School
- Yanghwa Middle School
- Dangsanseo Middle School
- Dangsan Middle School
- Youngwon Middle School

=== Elementary schools ===
- Seoul Yeongdong Elementary School
- Seoul Yeongjung Elementary School
- Dangjung Elementary School
- Yunjung Elementary School
- Munrae Elementary School
- Dangsan Elementary School
- Yeongwon Elementary School
- Dorim Elementary School
- Yeouido Elementary School

=== International schools ===
- Yeong deng pou Korea Chinese primary school (永登浦華僑小學/한국영등포화교소학교)

== Sister cities ==
- Cheongyang, South Korea – Since October 24, 1995
- Goseong, South Korea – Since September 14, 1995
- Yeongam, South Korea – Since October 17, 1995
- Kishiwada, Japan – Since October 31, 2002
- Mentougou District, China – Since April 21, 1995
- Huangpu, Shanghai, China
- (United States) Monterey Park, California, U.S. – Since October 30, 2007

== See also ==
- Geography of South Korea
- Subdivisions of South Korea
- Administrative divisions of Seoul
- Economy of Seoul
