= Mok-dong =

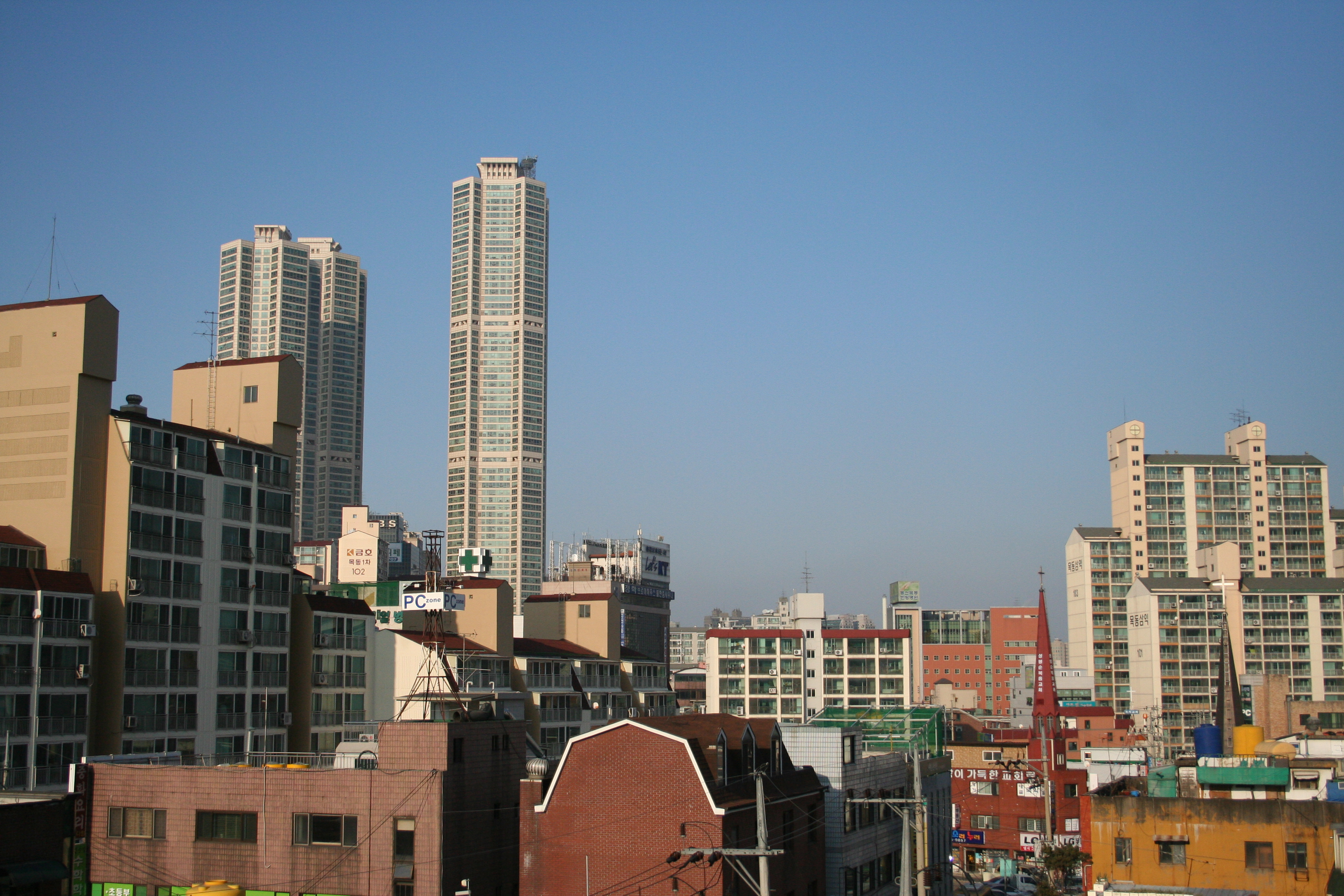
- Architecture over Mok-dong
- Country: South Korea

Area
  - Total: 5.34 km^{2} (2.06 sq mi)

Population (2008)
  - Total: 164,267
  - Density: 30,761.61/km^{2} (79,672.2/sq mi)

Korean name
- Hangul: 목동
- Hanja: 木洞
- RR: Mok-dong
- MR: Mok-tong

Mok-dong (Korean: 목동) is a ward of Yangcheon District, Seoul, South Korea. Commonly referred to as a "special education district", the upper-middle to upper-class neighborhood is best known for its abundance of private institutions, or Hagwons, as well as quality public schools. It is also home to the headquarters of two broadcasting corporations, SBS and CBS (Christian Broadcasting System). Also situated in Mok-dong are the Hyperion Towers, the tallest of which is 69 stories or 256 metres (840 ft) tall. The tallest tower, Tower A, is one of the tallest skyscraper in Seoul and one of the tallest residential buildings globally. During the Joseon period, it was used as a ranch where horses were grazed by many trees and was transformed into a wooden area.

== History ==
Historically, it was an agricultural area known for horse breeding. In the 1980s, it was one of the cheapest residential areas in Seoul due to the pollution of the Anyangcheon river, risk of heavy flooding, and the noise of unauthorized factories. From 1983 when the development plans for the regions were decided, the dong was developed as a high-density residential area by the military government ahead of 1986 Asian Games and the 1988 Summer Olympics, not only to meet growing housing demands in Seoul, but also to fill the void on the way from the airport to the stadiums. During the early stages of development, original residents of the region protested against official reports that they will be only provided ₩100,000 for their relocations, which caused mass protests and led to the recognition of "the right to live" in the country.

== Broadcasting institutions ==
- Korea Communications Standards Commission (Office)
- SBS Headquarters
- Christian Broadcasting System Headquarters

== Neighborhoods ==
- Mok 1-dong
- Mok 2-dong
- Mok 3-dong
- Mok 4-dong
- Mok 5-dong

== Education ==
- Yangchung Middle School
- Wolchon Middle School
- Mokdong Middle School

== Points of interest ==
- Mokdong Stadium, Mokdong Baseball Stadium and Mokdong Ice Rink
- Hyperion Tower
- Yongwang mountain
- GomTV Studios
- Hyundai Department Store, which is built under the Hyperion Tower
- Mok-dong station
- Sinmokdong station

== See also ==
- Administrative divisions of South Korea
