= Dorim-dong =

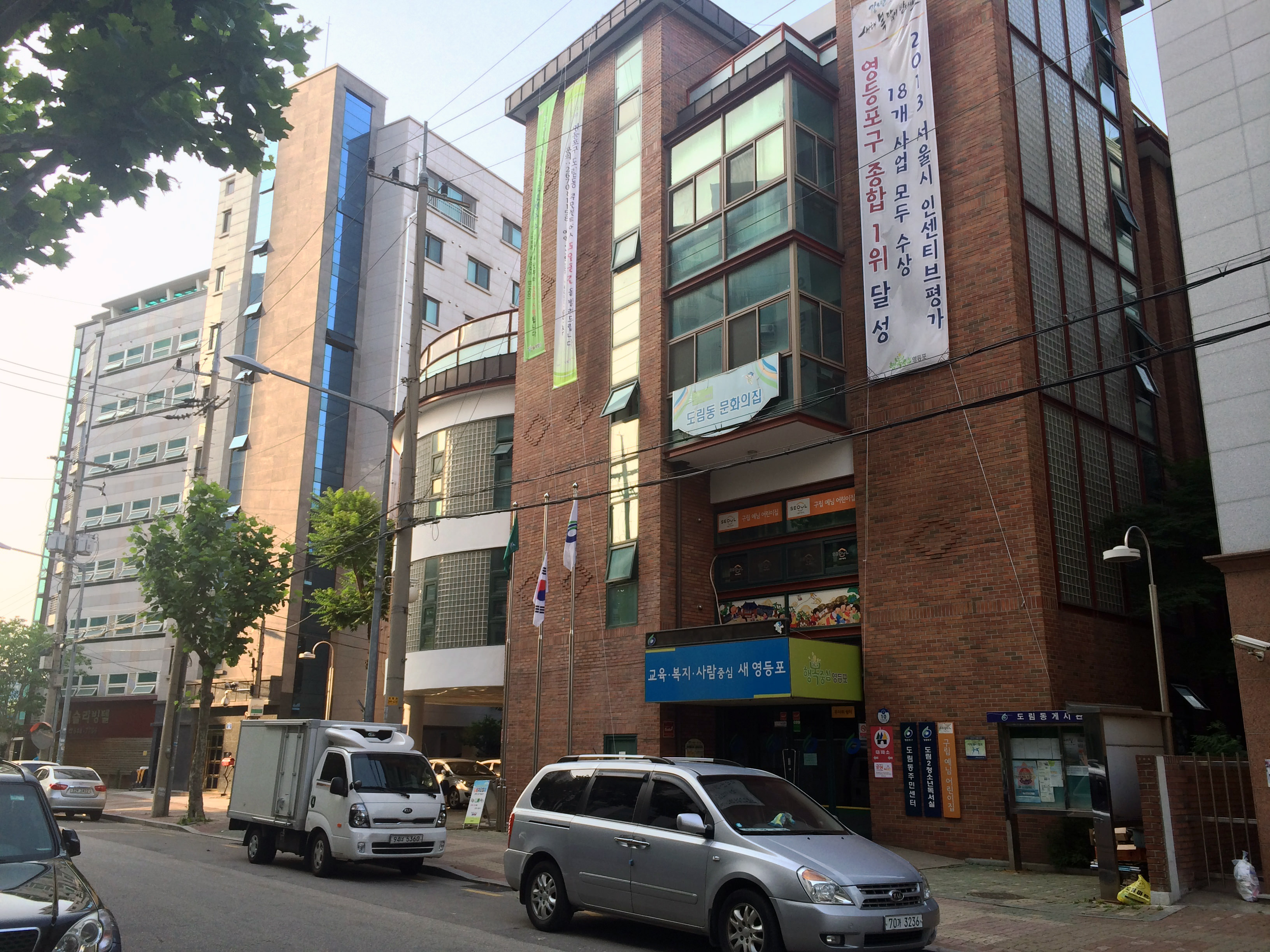
- Dorim-dong Community Service Center
- Interactive map of Dorim-dong
- Country: South Korea

Area
  - Total: 0.89 km^{2} (0.34 sq mi)

Population (2001)
  - Total: 23,276
  - Density: 26,000/km^{2} (68,000/sq mi)

Korean name
- Hangul: 도림동
- Hanja: 道林洞
- RR: Dorim-dong
- MR: Torim-dong

Dorim-dong (Korean: 도림동) is a dong (neighborhood) of Yeongdeungpo District, Seoul, South Korea.

== Overview ==
Dorim-dong, originally referred to as "Dojimiri" or "Dwaeumiri," derived its name from the mountainous landscape that once encased it, resembling a fortress-like setting, despite its transformation into a residential locale. Over time, this appellation was condensed to "Dorim-ri."

During the Joseon period, Dorim-dong thrived as an agricultural hub, benefitting from its moist terrain ideal for cultivating barley, millet, maize, and beans. The vicinity near Dorimcheon witnessed the cultivation of buckwheat and adzuki beans, with the introduction of barley farming facilitated by the construction of levees.

Historically, the Dorim-dong region was delineated by natural boundaries, often denoted by names like Moratmal, Dwaejimaeul, and Jumakgeori during the Joseon era. In the administrative records of Gyeonggi-do Geumcheon-hyun Sangbuk-myeon, it was referred to as Doyamiri (도야미리). Following the establishment of Buk-myeon in Siheung-gun in 1914, Doyamiri was redesignated as Dorim-ri and assimilated into Buk-myeon. Its affiliation transitioned to Gyeongseongbu in 1936, where it was known as Dorimjeong (도림정). Subsequently, in 1946, it was subdivided into Dorim-dong and Saok-dong (사옥동, known today as Munrae-dong).

== See also ==
- Administrative divisions of South Korea
