= Dangsan-dong =

Neighborhood in Seoul, South Korea

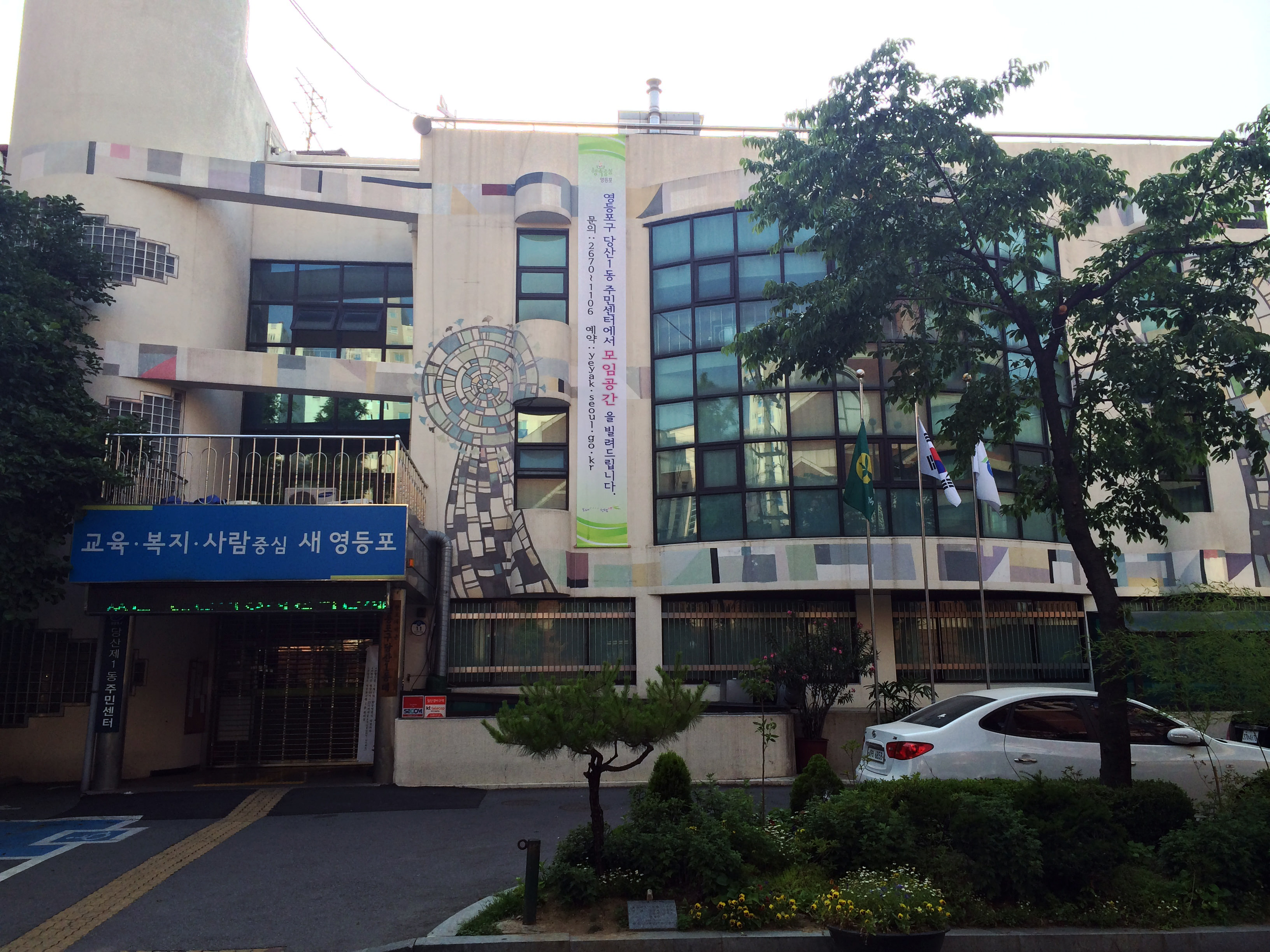
- Dangsan 1-dong Community Service Center (Yeongdeungpo District)
- Country: South Korea

Area
  - Total: 2.3 km^{2} (0.89 sq mi)

Population (2001)
  - Total: 45,302
  - Density: 19,696.52/km^{2} (51,013.8/sq mi)

Korean name
- Hangul: 당산동
- Hanja: 堂山洞
- RR: Dangsan-dong
- MR: Tangsan-dong

Dangsan-dong (Korean: 당산동) is a dong (neighborhood) of Yeongdeungpo District, Seoul, South Korea.

== Overview ==
Dangsan-dong is a legal district that holds the administrative districts of Dangsan 1·2-dong, consisting of two administrative districts. Historically, the region was abundant with azalea trees that bloomed profusely in late spring, leading to the name Dangsan-dong. Another explanation for the name is the presence of the mountain known as 'Dansan' (單山) at Dangsan-dong 110, where a military camp once held 'Dangje' (堂祭) ceremonies.

Initially under the jurisdiction of Gyeongseong-bu on April 1, 1936, overseeing Dangsan, Yangpyeong, and Yanghwajeonghoe, Dangsan 1-dong separated from Yangpyeong and Yanghwajeong in 1941. Subsequently, in March 1948, Dangsan 1-dong and Jungdong 2-dong were divided into three districts, and in April 1955, they were further subdivided into Dangsan 1~4-dong during the neighborhood system implementation.

== See also ==
- Administrative divisions of South Korea
