= Yangpyeong-dong =

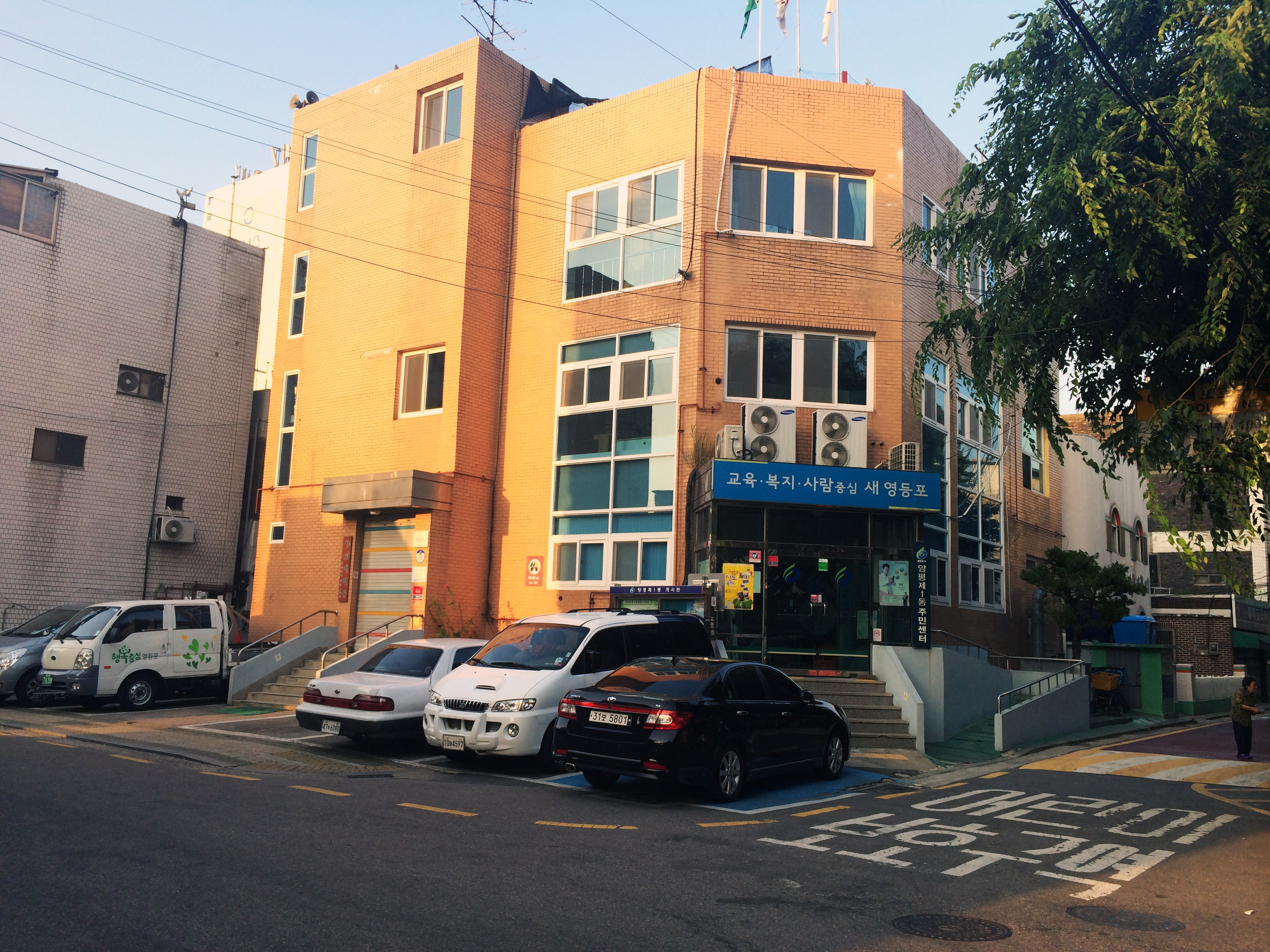
- Yangpyeong 1-dong Community Service Center (Yeongdeungpo District)
- Country: South Korea

Area
  - Total: 3.88 km^{2} (1.50 sq mi)

Population (2001)
  - Total: 36,104
  - Density: 9,310/km^{2} (24,100/sq mi)

Korean name
- Hangul: 양평동
- Hanja: 楊坪洞
- RR: Yangpyeong-dong
- MR: Yangp'yŏng-dong

Yangpyeong-dong (Korean: 양평동) is a dong (neighborhood) of Yeongdeungpo District, Seoul, South Korea.

== Overview ==
The Yangpyeong area, historically was Yangpyeong-ri, Sangbuk-myeon, Geumcheon-hyeon, Gyeonggi-do during the Joseon period, underwent several administrative changes over the years. In 1914, it was a part of Buk-myeon, Siheung-gun Yangpyeong-ri, and by 1920, it fell under the jurisdiction of Yeongdeungpo-myeon, Siheung-gun. In 1931, it was officially renamed Yangpyeong-ri, Yeongdeungpo-eup, Siheung-gun, and in 1936, it was integrated into Gyeongseong-bu and designated as Yanghwajang (楊花町). Following the liberation in 1946, it was reorganized as Yangpyeong-dong, Yeongdeungpo District. Concurrently, Yanghwa-dong was also renamed Yanghwa-dong, Yeongdeungpo District when the term "jeong (町)" was replaced with "dong" in October 1946.

== Outline ==
Yangpyeong-dong is bordered by Yangcheon District to the west, Dangsan-dong to the east, and Munnae-dong to the south. Yangpyeong-dong was Yangpyeong-ri Sangbuk-myeon, Geumcheon-hyun, Gyeonggi-do during the Joseon era.

== Education ==
- Dangsan Elementary school
- Seonyoo Elementary school
- Seonyoo Middle school
- Han-gang Media High school
- Seonyoo High school
- Gwanak High school

== See also ==
- Administrative divisions of South Korea
