= Yongwangsan =

Mountain in Seoul, South Korea

Coordinates: 37°32′32″N 126°52′39″E

- Umji Mountain (嚴知山)
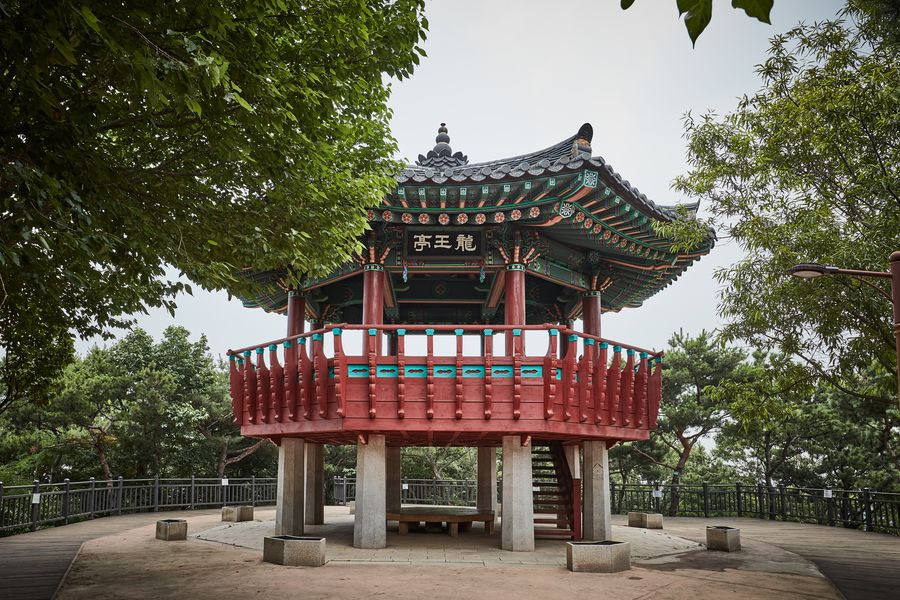
- Yongwang Gazebo at the top of the mountain.

Highest point
- Elevation: 78 m (256 ft)

Geography
- Location: South Korea

Yongwangsan (Korean: 용왕산; lit. 'Yongwang Mountain') is a mountain in Seoul Yangcheon District Mok-dong, South Korea. Its height is 78 metres (256 ft), and it is also called Umji Mountain.

== Name ==
The mountain's original name of "Umji" roughly means "entrance" or "beginning". It referred to the fact that it was an entrance to a field that was capable of accommodating a thousand homes. Related, the village behind the mountain is called Umjimi Village.

== Legend ==
A legend associated with the place is as follows. An old man who had the family name Park requested his kids to never tell anyone that he died and to do not tie his body with ropes, but the kids ignored his request. After that, the rumor about the will spread among the village, which led to an investigation by local officials, who found that the coffin of the tomb of the old man was empty. The local officials soon noticed that a dragon was wiggling all tied up, which they killed soon after. Rumors after this incident explained that the late park wanted to be a dragon king but was left to ruins since the kids refused to accept his request. This led to the placed named Yongwangsan where yongwang stands for Dragon King in Korean. Another variation of the story tells that park was intentionally kind to the people to be reborn as a king, but was not able to fulfill his desires due to a fault that he mistreated a beggar.

The second type of story that is associated with the place is related with a heavenly official, where the said official falls in love with a fairy betraying the Jade Emperor and secretly marrying with the fairy and lived in the mountain. The jade emperor was thus furious and punished them, which led to the official turn into a imugi(a mythical being in korean mythology that wants to be a dragon but cannot be with certain limitations) and the fairy became Seonyu Peak. The imugi turned official visited Seonyu Peak but could not go because the Jade Emperor was stepping on his tail. Thus the tears of the imugi is told to be the Anyangcheon river, and the nail scratches became the pits which are related with the flood.

== Festival ==
The mountain is known for its annual sunrise festival at the pavilion Yongwangjeong during the New Year.
