= Sports Complex station (Seoul) =

Station of the Seoul Metropolitan Subway

종합운동장; Sports Complex
종합운동장; Sports Complex
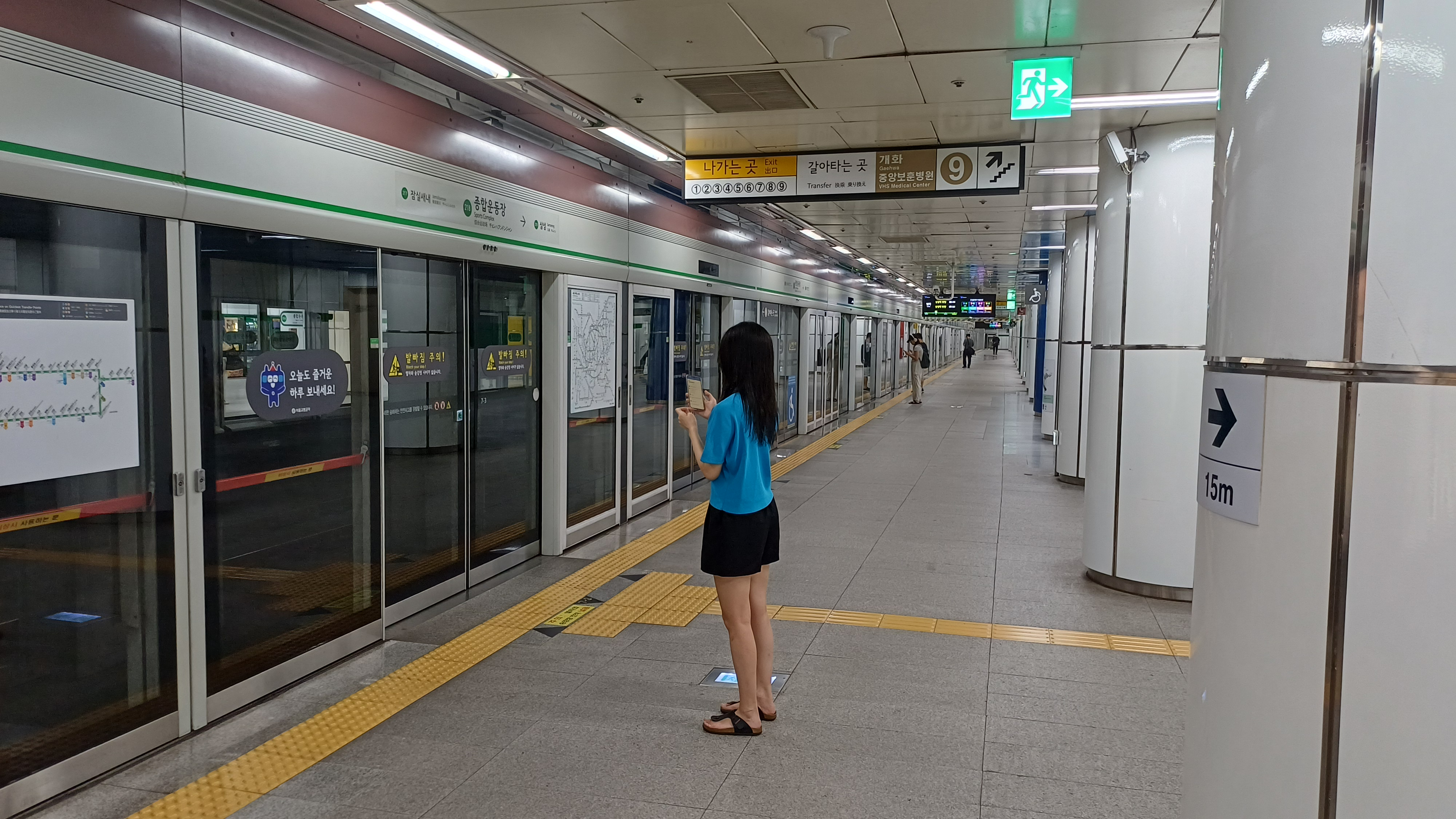
- Station platform (Line 2)

Korean name
- Hangul: 종합운동장역
- Hanja: 綜合運動場驛
- Revised Romanization: Jonghap-undongjang-yeok
- McCune–Reischauer: Chonghap-undongjang-yŏk

General information
- Location: 1-236 Jamsil 1-dong, Songpa-gu, Seoul
- Coordinates: 37°30′40″N 127°04′25″E
- Operator: Seoul Metro
- Lines: Line 2 Line 9
- Platforms: 4
- Tracks: 4

Construction
- Structure type: Underground

Key dates
- October 31, 1980: Line 2 opened
- March 28, 2015: Line 9 opened

Passengers
- (Daily) Based on Jan-Dec of 2012. Line 2: 35,031
Services
Preceding station	Seoul Metropolitan Subway	Following station
Jamsilsaenae Next counterclockwise	Line 2	Samseong Next clockwise
Bongeunsa towards Gaehwa	Line 9	Samjeon towards VHS Medical Center
Bongeunsa towards Gimpo International Airport	Line 9 Express	Seokchon towards VHS Medical Center
Location

Sports Complex station is a station on Seoul Subway Line 2 and Seoul Subway Line 9. As its name indicates, it serves the nearby Seoul Sports Complex including Seoul Olympic Stadium. Asia Park is also accessible by foot from the station. In early 2015 this station became a transfer station between Line 2 and Line 9 of the Seoul Subway.

== Station layout ==
=== Line 2 ===
Jamsilsaenae ↑
Inner | | Outer
↓ Samseong

Outer circle	← ● Line 2 Counterclockwise
Inner circle	● Line 2 Clockwise →

=== Line 9 ===
Bongeunsa ↑
S/B | | N/B
↓ Samjeon

Northbound	← ● Line 9 toward Gaehwa (local), Gimpo Int'l Airport (express)
Southbound	→ ● Line 9 toward VHS Medical Center

== Gallery ==
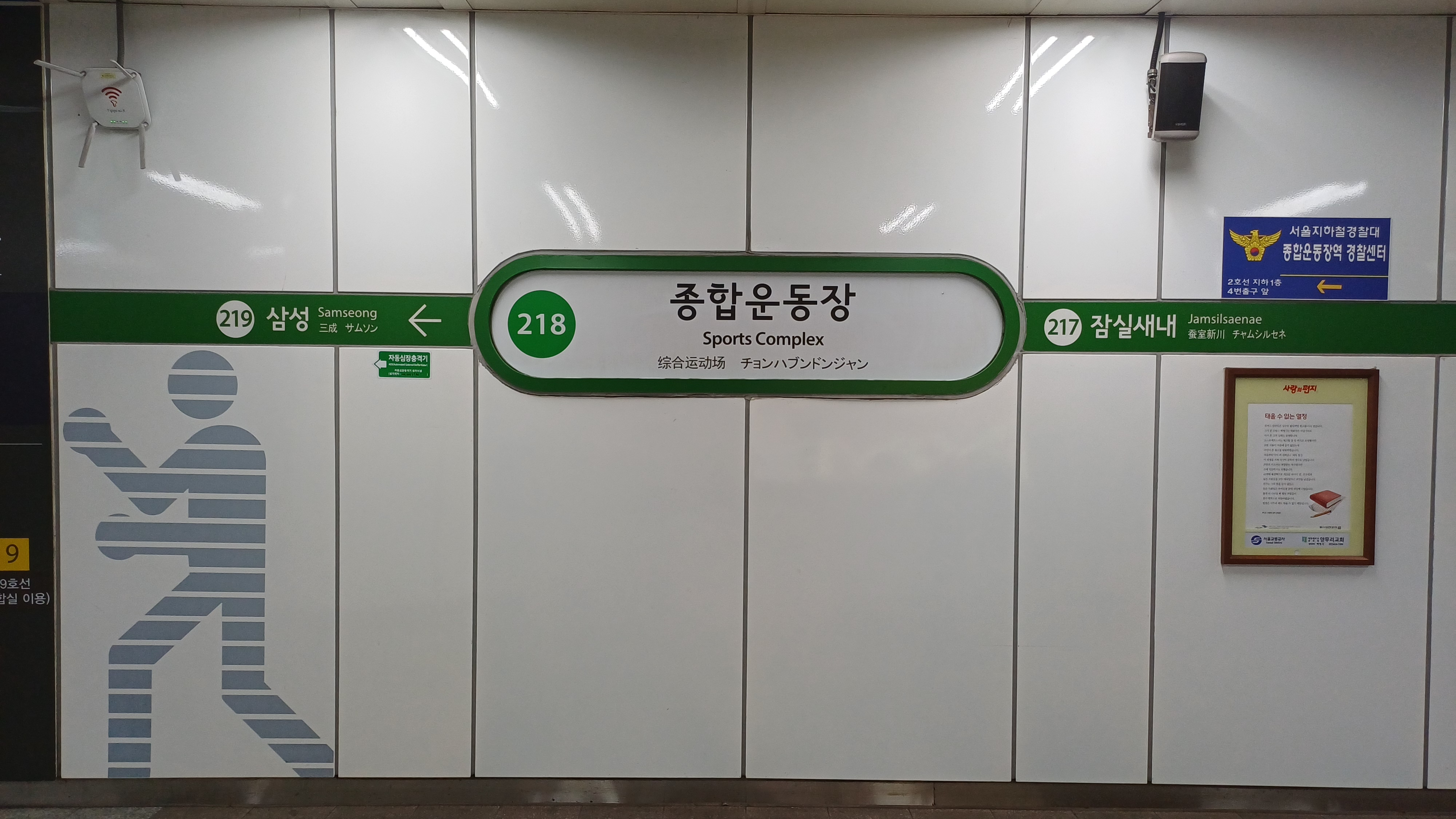
Station sign (Line 2)

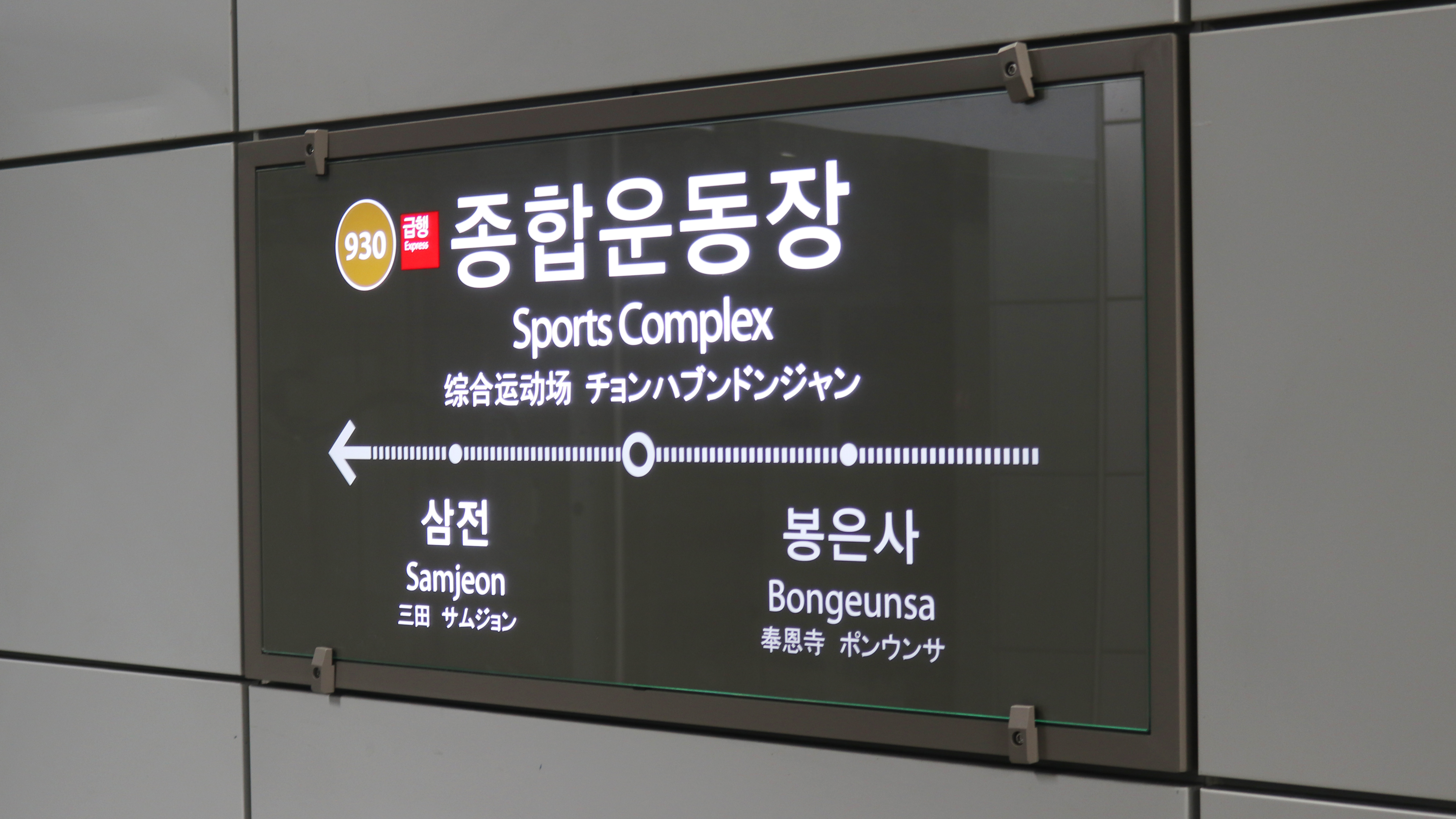
Station Sign (Line 9)

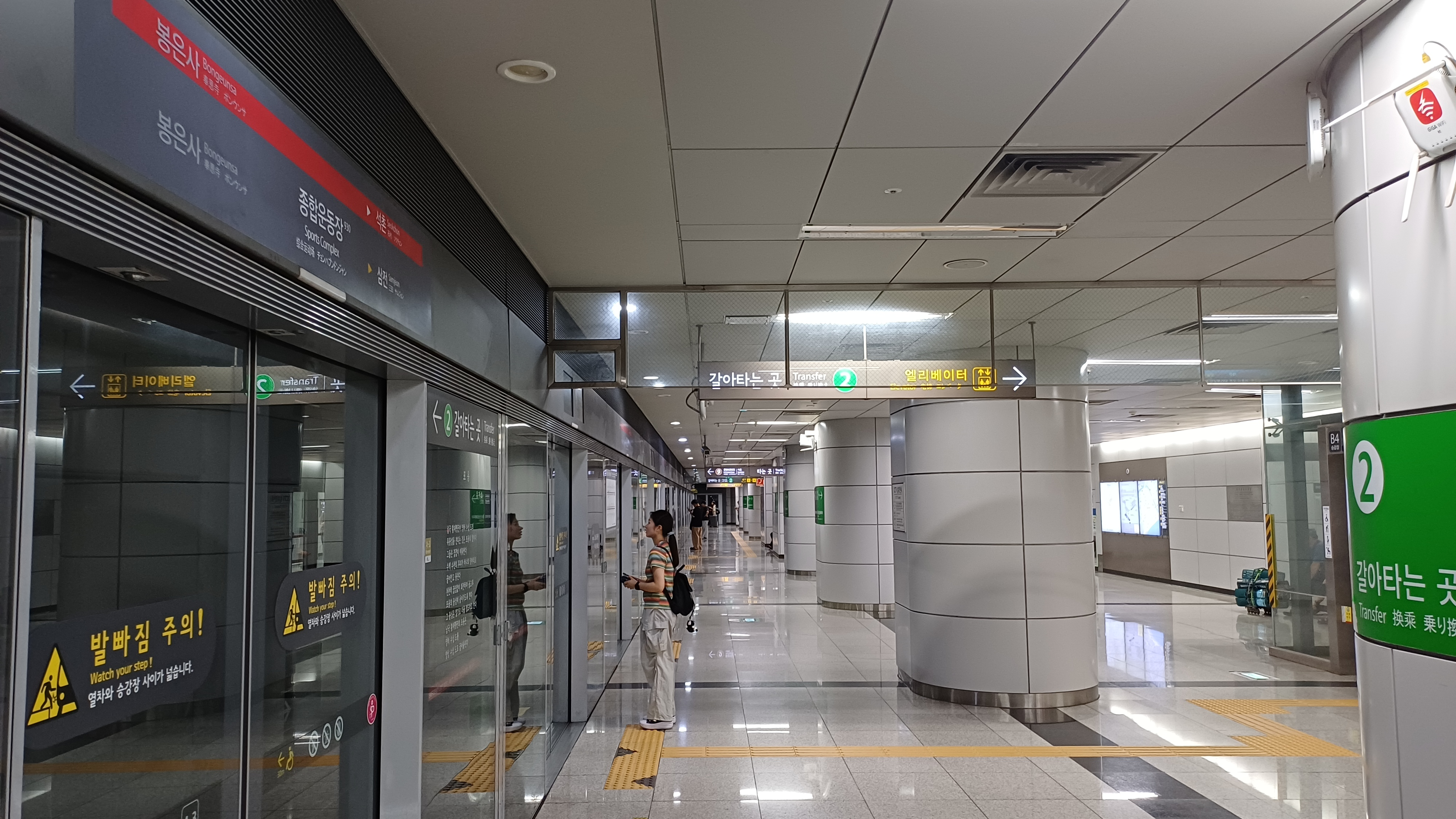
Station platform (Line 9)

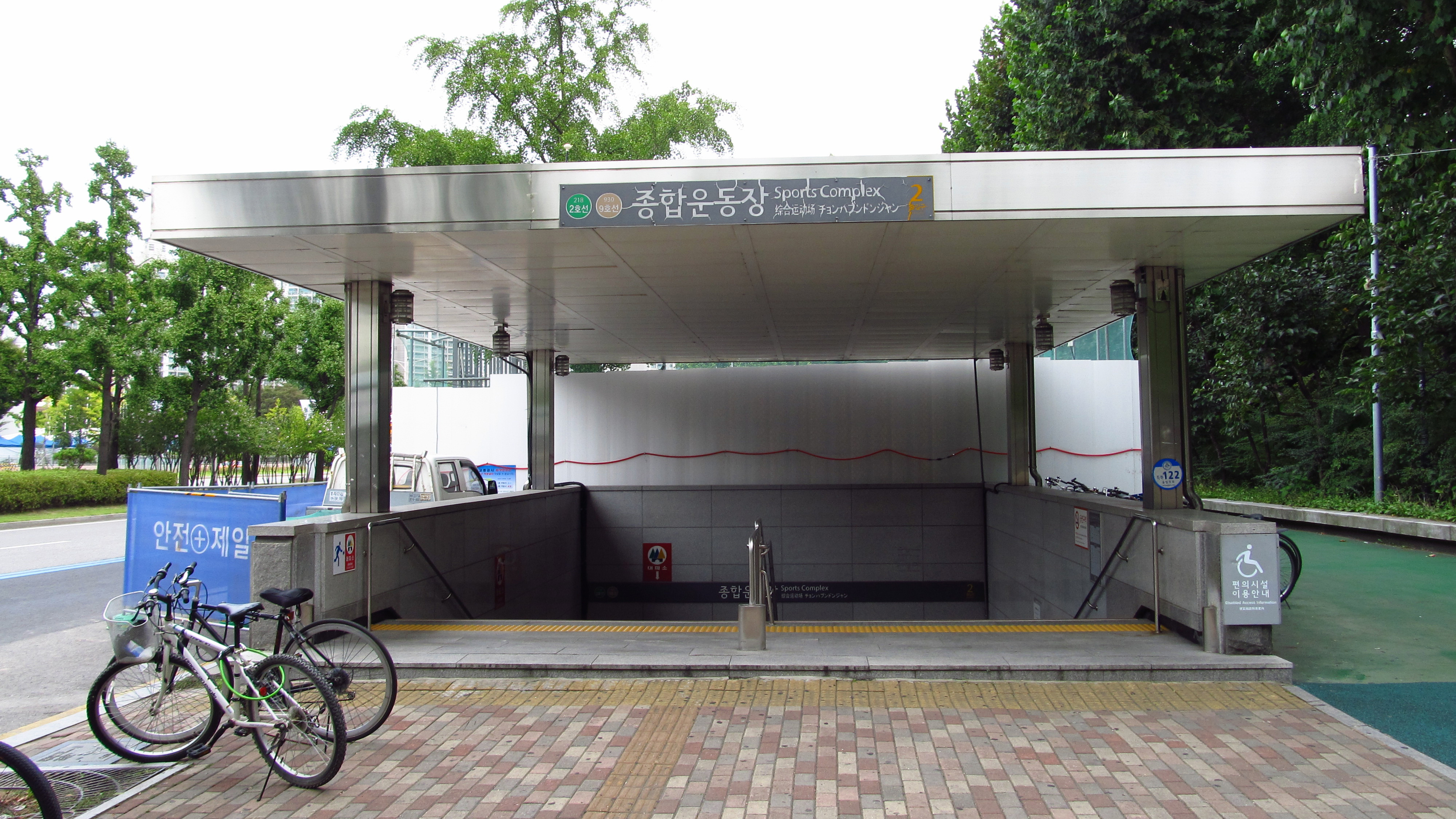
Exit 2
