= Songpa-dong =

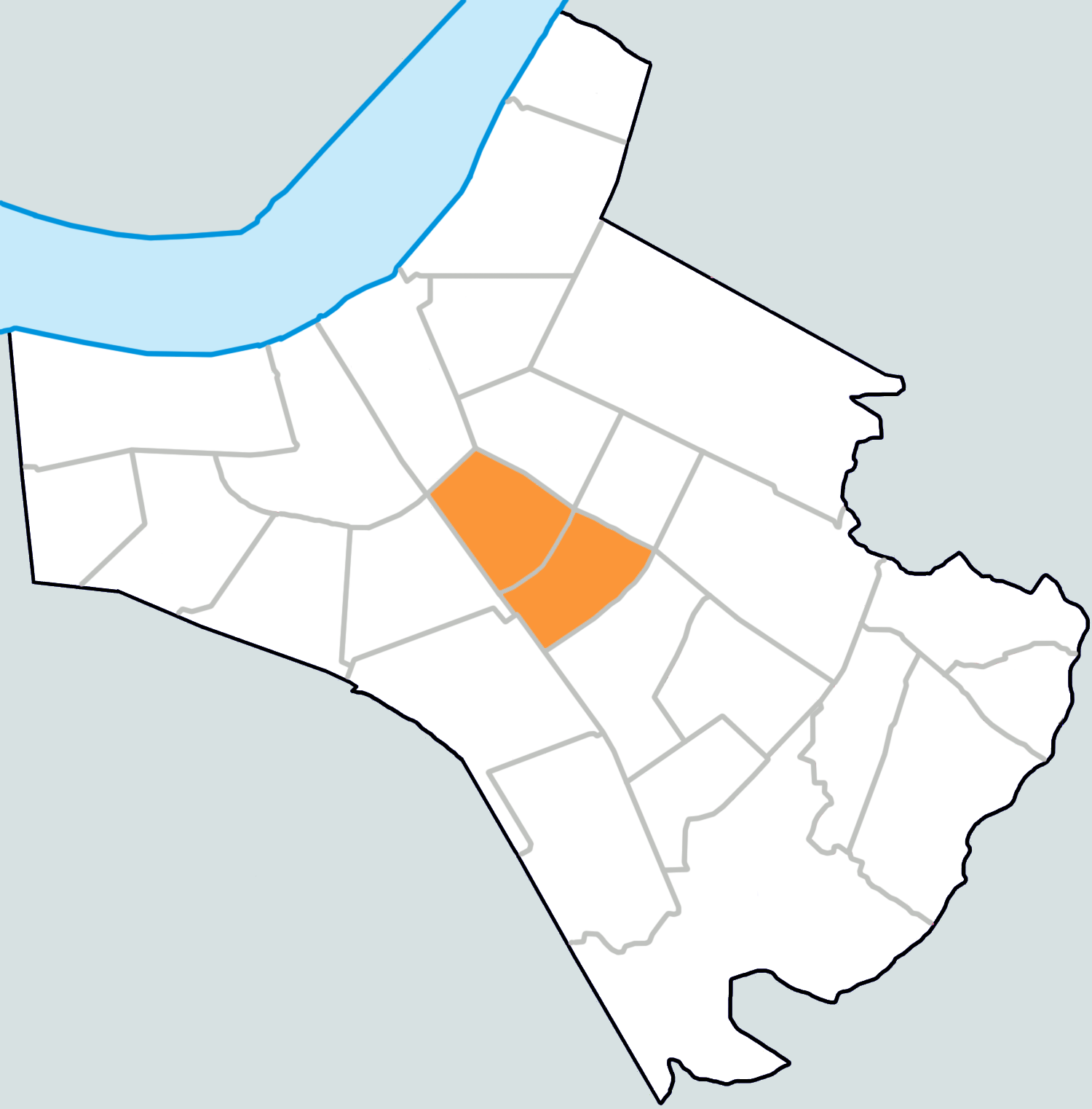
- Country: South Korea

Area
  - Total: 1.32 km^{2} (0.51 sq mi)

Population (2013)
  - Total: 49,917
  - Density: 37,800/km^{2} (97,900/sq mi)

Korean name
- Hangul: 송파동
- Hanja: 松坡洞
- RR: Songpa-dong
- MR: Songp'a-dong

Songpa-dong (Korean: 송파동) is a neighbourhood, dong, of Songpa District, Seoul, South Korea. There are three assumptions on the etymology of the name. One is that it may come from "Songpa Naruteo" (송파나루터 Songpa ferry)

== Overview ==
The name "Songpa-dong" is believed to have several origins. One theory suggests that during the early Joseon Dynasty, the area was originally called "Yeonpagwon," which later changed to "Sopagon," then to "Sopari," and eventually became "Songpajin." Another theory points to the area's location along the Han River, where a hill densely populated with pine trees existed. This hill, known as "Sonnamu Eondeok" (Pine Tree Hill), is thought to have given rise to the name "Songpa," derived from the term "song" for pine trees.

Another local legend tells of a fisherman who lived in the area and would go fishing on the Han River every day. One day, while taking a nap on his boat on calm waters, he was suddenly awakened when a section of the pine tree hill collapsed into the river. From that day on, the area came to be known as "Songpa."

In 1577, during the Joseon Dynasty, the area was part of Songpa-dong in Middae-myeon, Gwangju County, Gyeonggi Province. In 1914, during the Japanese colonial period, administrative boundaries were redefined, and the area was officially named "Songpari."

Later, in 1963, as part of the large-scale administrative expansion of Seoul, the area was incorporated into Seongdong District and became known as Songpa-dong. When Gangnam District was established in 1975, Songpa-dong became part of it. In 1979, with the creation of Gangdong District, the area was once again reorganized, becoming part of Gangdong. Finally, in 1988, when Songpa District was separated from Gangdong District, Songpa-dong became part of the newly formed Songpa District, where it remains today.

== Education ==
Schools located in Songpa-dong:

- Joongdae Elementary School
- Songpa Elementary School
- Garak Middle School
- Ilsin Girls' Middle School
- Garak High School
- Jamsil Girls' High School
- Ilshin Girls' Commercial High School

== Transportation ==
- Seokchon station of
- Songpa station of

== See also ==
- Administrative divisions of South Korea
