= Asia Park =

Park in Seoul, South Korea

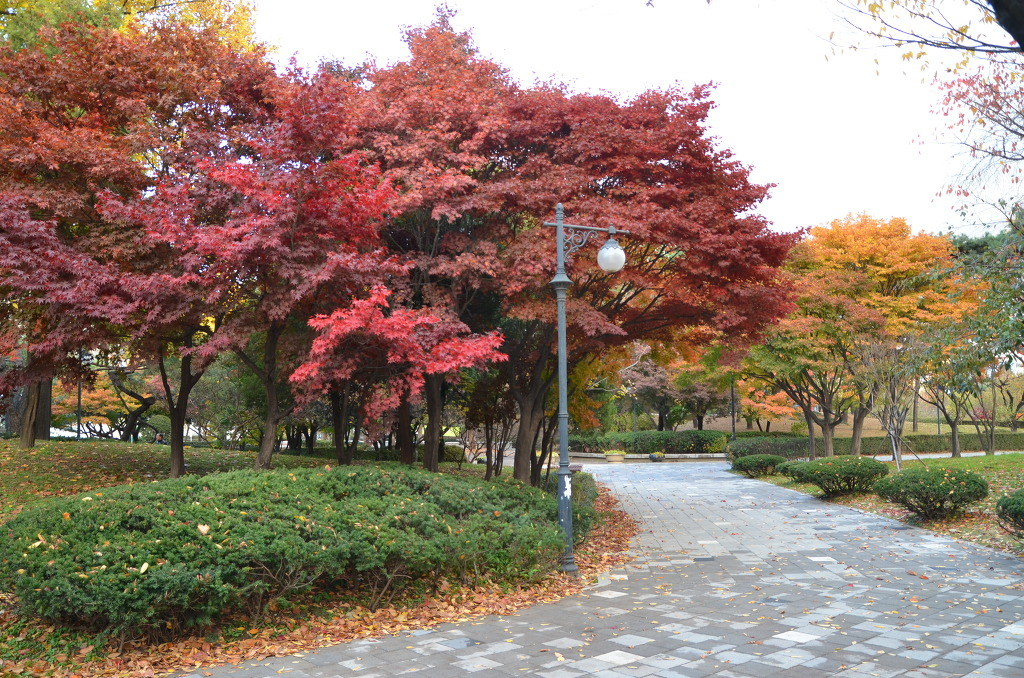
- Asia Park, autumn 2012
- Interactive map of Asia Park
- Type: Urban park
- Location: Jamsil, Seoul, South Korea
- Coordinates: 37°30′37″N 127°04′35″E
- Area: 66,027 square metres (16 acres)
- Created: 1986

Asia Park (Korean: 아시아 공원) was built for the 1986 Asian Games in Seoul, South Korea. The park is located near Seoul Sports Complex.

== Transportation ==
Sports Complex Station on Seoul Subway Line 2.
