= Seoul Olympic Stadium =

Stadium in Seoul, South Korea

Coordinates: 37°30′57″N 127°04′22″E

- Jamsil Olympic Stadium
- Seoul Olympic Stadium in 2020
- Interactive map of Seoul Olympic Stadium
- Location: Jamsil-dong, Songpa-gu, Seoul, South Korea
- Operator: Seoul Sports Facilities Management Center
- Capacity: 65,599; 18,000 (baseball)
- Surface: Grass
- Field size: 105 by 70 metres (115 by 77 yards)
- Public transit: Seoul Metropolitan Subway: at Sports Complex

Construction
- Groundbreaking: 28 November 1977; 48 years ago
- Opened: 29 September 1984; 42 years ago
- Cost: 48 billion won
- Architect: Kim Swoo-geun

Tenants
- Seoul United (2007–2010); Seoul E-Land (2015–2022); Doosan Bears (2027–present); LG Twins (2027–present)

- Seoul Olympic Stadium
- Hangul: 서울올림픽주경기장
- Hanja: 서울올림픽主競技場
- RR: Seoul Ollimpik ju gyeonggijang
- MR: Sŏul Ollimp'ik chu kyŏnggijang

The Seoul Olympic Stadium (Korean: 서울올림픽주경기장), also known as Jamsil Olympic Stadium, is a multi-purpose stadium in Seoul, South Korea. It is the main stadium built for the 1988 Summer Olympics and the 10th Asian Games in 1986. It is the centrepiece of the Seoul Sports Complex in the Songpa District, in the southeast of the city south of the Han River.

== Design and construction ==
Seoul Olympic Stadium was designed by Kim Swoo-geun. The lines of the stadium's profile imitate the elegant curves of a Joseon white porcelain. Spectator seats are distributed across two tiers beneath a partially covered roof structure. The stadium is capable of accommodating 100,000 people simultaneously and has a seating capacity of 65,599.

Before its construction, Seoul's largest venues were Dongdaemun Stadium and Hyochang Stadium. Seating 30,000 and 20,000 respectively, they were too small to attract world-class sporting events. Construction on the new stadium began in 1977 with the aim of staging the Asian Games in 1986.

== Sports ==
Officially, the stadium opened on 29 September 1984 as the main work for the 10th Asian Games held two years later, then the Olympics in 1988. However, it has not been used to stage a major world sporting event since then. It currently has no occupant, although the Korea Football Association has expressed interest in renovating and modernizing the stadium, transforming it into a permanent ground for national team matches.

The events hosted by the stadium during the Olympics were the opening and closing ceremonies, athletics, the football finals, and the equestrian jumping individual final. The stadium also performed the same functions during the 1988 Summer Paralympics.

=== Football ===
From the match against Japan on 30 September 1984 to the match against Yugoslavia on 28 May 2000, the Olympic Stadium served as the home ground of the South Korea national football team before the team moved to the Seoul World Cup Stadium. Later, as part of an effort to revitalize football across the nation, South Korea used the Olympic Stadium for the 2013 EAFF East Asian Cup.

In 2015, a newly formed professional football club, Seoul E-Land FC, began using the stadium.

=== Auto racing ===
The Seoul ePrix had the circuit run over into the stadium and around the Seoul Sports Complex.

== List of concerts ==
Date	Performer(s)	Tour
11 and 13 October 1996	Michael Jackson	HIStory World Tour
25 June 1999	Michael Jackson and various artists	MJ & Friends
18 September 1999	H.O.T.	918 Concert
7 October 2000	Ricky Martin	Livin' la Vida Loca Tour
27 February 2001	H.O.T.	Forever Concert
22 June 2001	The Three Tenors	2001 World Tour
2 April 2002	Roger Waters	In the Flesh
8–9 June 2004	Sarah Brightman	Harem World Tour
17 September 2004	Elton John	Elton John 2004 Tour
14 January 2006	Backstreet Boys	Never Gone Tour
15 August 2006	Metallica	Escape from the Studio '06
27–28 November 2010	JYJ	JYJ Showcase Tour 2010
27 April 2012	Lady Gaga	Born This Way Ball Tour
18 August 2012	SM Town	SM Town Live World Tour III
19 August 2012	Eminem	The Recovery Tour
17 August 2013	Muse	The 2nd Law World Tour
18 August 2013	Metallica	Summer Tour 2013
9–10 August 2014	JYJ	The Return of The King Asia tour 2014
16 August 2014	Lady Gaga	artRAVE: The ARTPOP Ball
15 August 2014	YG Entertainment	YG Family 2014 World Tour: Power
25 October 2014	g.o.d	g.o.d 15th Anniversary Reunion Concert
2 May 2015	Paul McCartney	Out There!
15–16 April 2017	Coldplay	A Head Full of Dreams Tour
27–28 May 2017	Exo	Exo Planet 3 – The Exo'rdium(dot)
25–26 August 2018	BTS	Love Yourself World Tour
13–14 October 2018	H.O.T.	Forever [Highfive of Teenagers] Concert
26, 27 and 29 October 2019	BTS	Love Yourself World Tour: Speak Yourself
24 October 2021	BTS	Permission to Dance on Stage (online)
10, 12 and 13 March 2022	BTS	Permission to Dance on Stage – Seoul
8–9 September 2022	NCT Dream	The Dream Show 2: In A Dream
17–18 September 2022	IU	The Golden Hour: Under the Orange Sun
22–23 October 2022	NCT 127	Neo City – The Link+ (Note: A special concert as part of NCT 127's "Neo City – The Link" world tour.)
17–18 June 2023	Bruno Mars	Bruno Mars Live

== In popular culture ==
Seoul Olympic Stadium appears in the opening scene of the 2025 film KPop Demon Hunters.

== Notes ==
Preceded by Los Angeles Memorial Coliseum; Los Angeles	Summer Olympics; Opening and closing ceremonies (Olympic Stadium); 1988	Succeeded by Estadi Olímpic de Montjuïc; Barcelona
Preceded by Los Angeles Memorial Coliseum; Los Angeles	Summer Olympics; Olympic athletics competitions Main venue 1988	Succeeded by Estadi Olímpic de Montjuïc; Barcelona
Preceded by Rose Bowl; Pasadena	Summer Olympics; Men's football final venue 1988	Succeeded by Camp Nou; Barcelona
