= World Monorail =

Monorail in South Korea

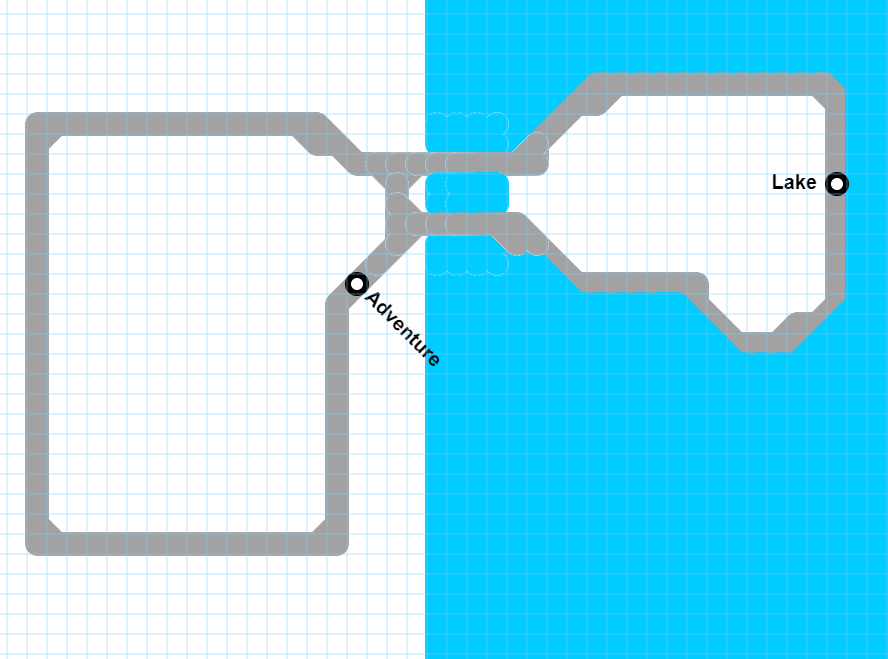
Map of the World Monorail

World Monorail is a monorail line built by Switzerland manufacturer Intamin currently located in Lotte World in Jamsil-dong, Songpa District, Seoul, South Korea.

It is one of the methods of getting around Lotte World. There are two stations, Lake Station, which is on the Magic Island of the park, and Adventure Station, which is on the indoor part of the park.

== Vehicle info ==
The vehicle is the Intamin People Porter. It has a max speed of 6.5 mph (10.5 km/h) with 18 maximum passengers.

== Run times ==
The monorail is operated during the open hours of Lotte World amusement park. It will only run indoors during extreme weather, or from July 16 to Aug 31 of hot weather.
