= 三田駅 =

三田駅 or 三田驛 may refer to:

- Mita Station
- Samjeon Station
- Sanda Station
