= Seokchon station =

Train station in South Korea

Coordinates: 37°30′19″N 127°06′25″E

석촌 (한솔병원); Seokchon (Hansol Hospital)
석촌 (한솔병원); Seokchon (Hansol Hospital)
- Station nameplate (Line 8)

Korean name
- Hangul: 석촌역
- Hanja: 石村驛
- Revised Romanization: Seokchon-yeok
- McCune–Reischauer: Sŏkch'on-yŏk

General information
- Location: 19 Songpa-dong, Songpa-gu, Seoul
- Operator: Seoul Metro
- Lines: Line 8 Line 9
- Platforms: 3
- Tracks: 4

Construction
- Structure type: Underground

Key dates
- November 23, 1996 December 1, 2018: Line 8 opened Line 9 opened
Location

Seokchon Station is an interchange station on Line 8 and Line 9 of the Seoul Metropolitan Subway, located near Seokchon Lake Park. Originally a station along Line 8 only, it became a transfer station when an extension of Line 9 opened on 1 December 2018.

== Entrance ==
- Exit 1 : Way to Jamsil, Seokchon Lake
- Exit 2 : Songpa 1 dong
- Exit 3 : Town office of Songpa 1 dong, Songpa 1 police office.

== Station layout ==
=== Line 8 ===
Jamsil ↑
S/B | | N/B
↓ Songpa

Northbound	← ● Line 8 toward Byeollae
Southbound	● Line 8 toward Moran →

=== Line 9 ===
Seokchon Gobun ↑
S/B | | N/B
↓ Songpanaru

Northbound	← ● Line 9 toward Gaehwa
Southbound	● Line 9 toward VHS Medical Center →

== Gallery ==
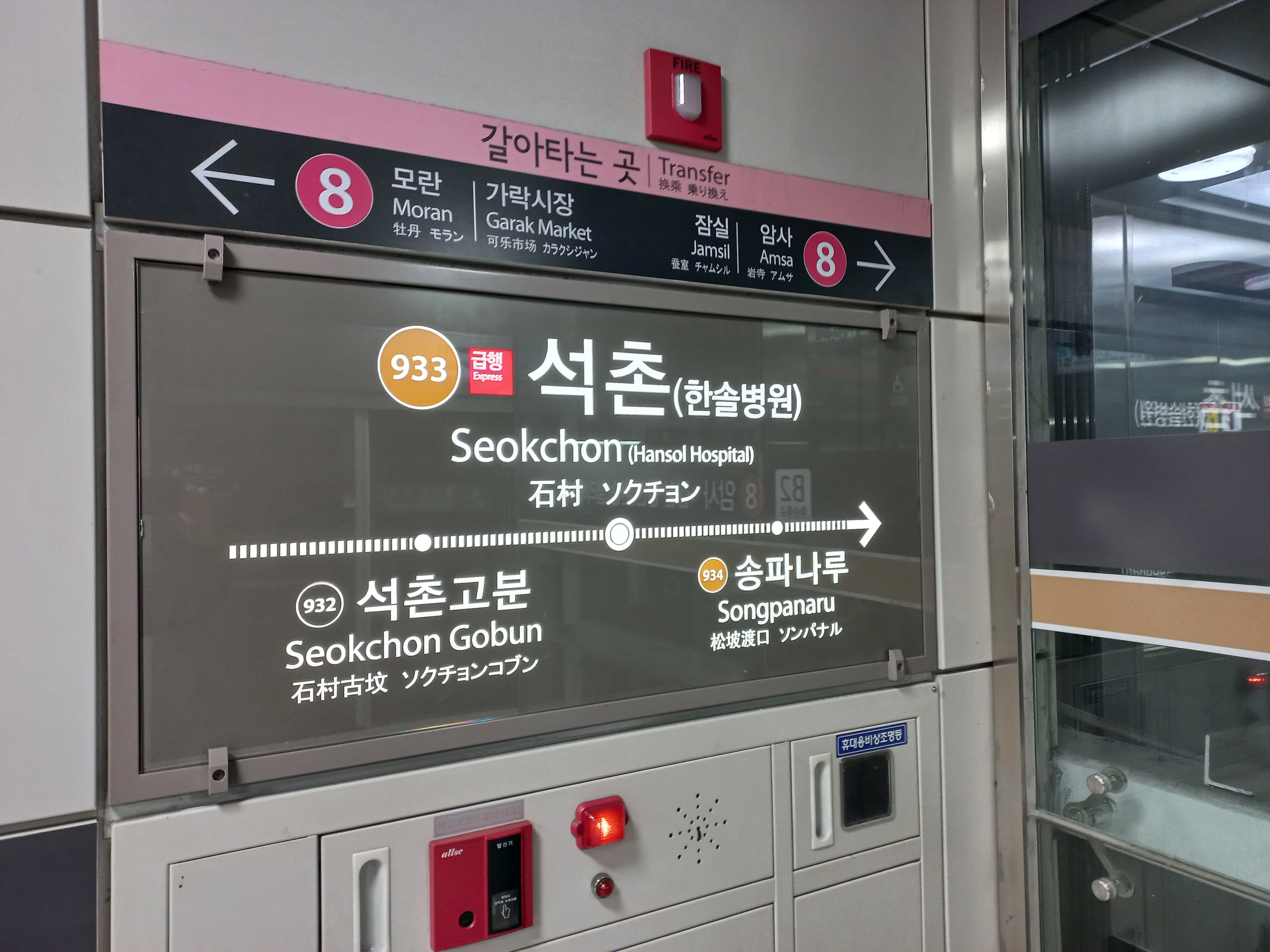
Station nameplate (Line 9)

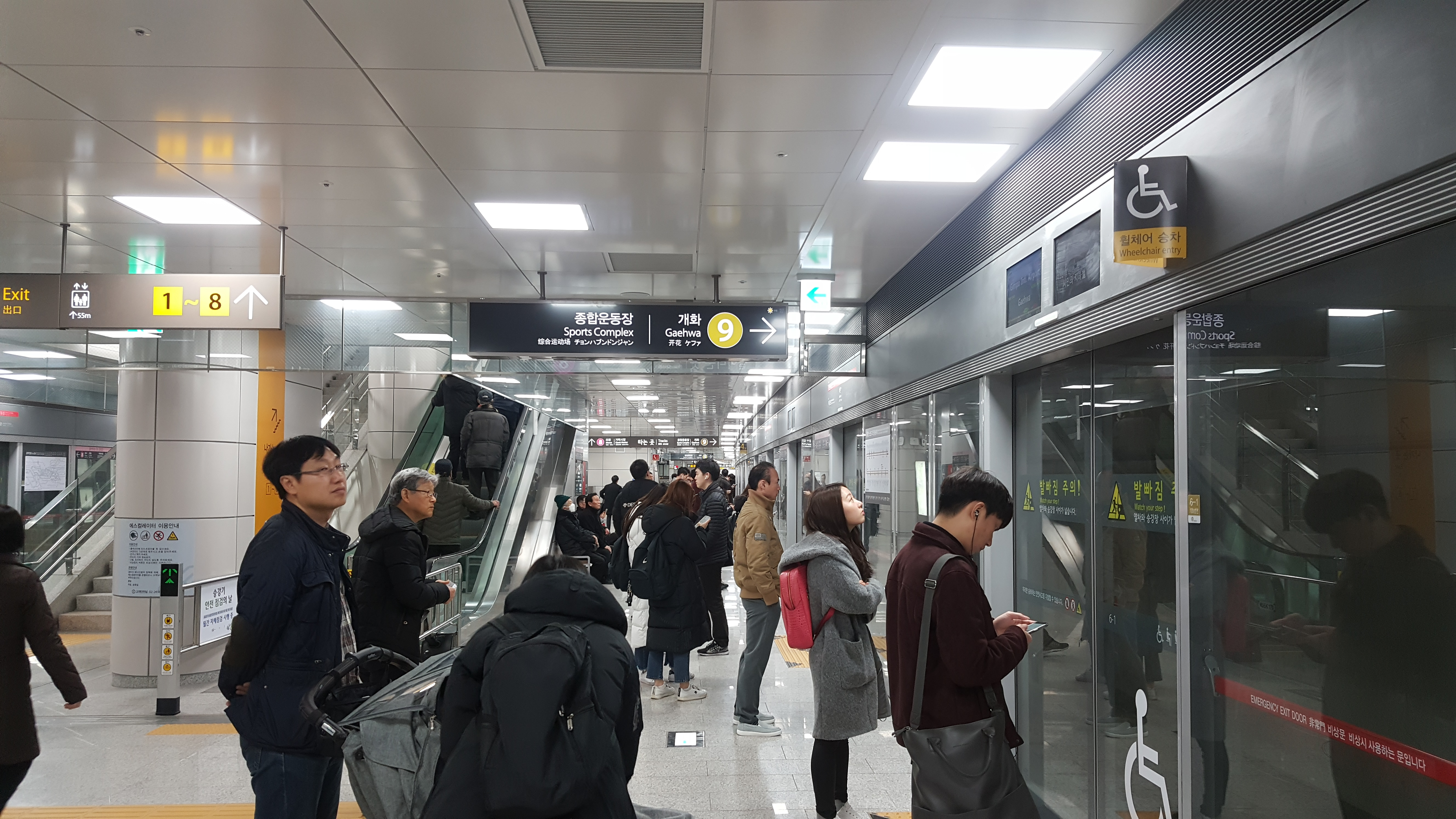
Northbound platform (Line 9)

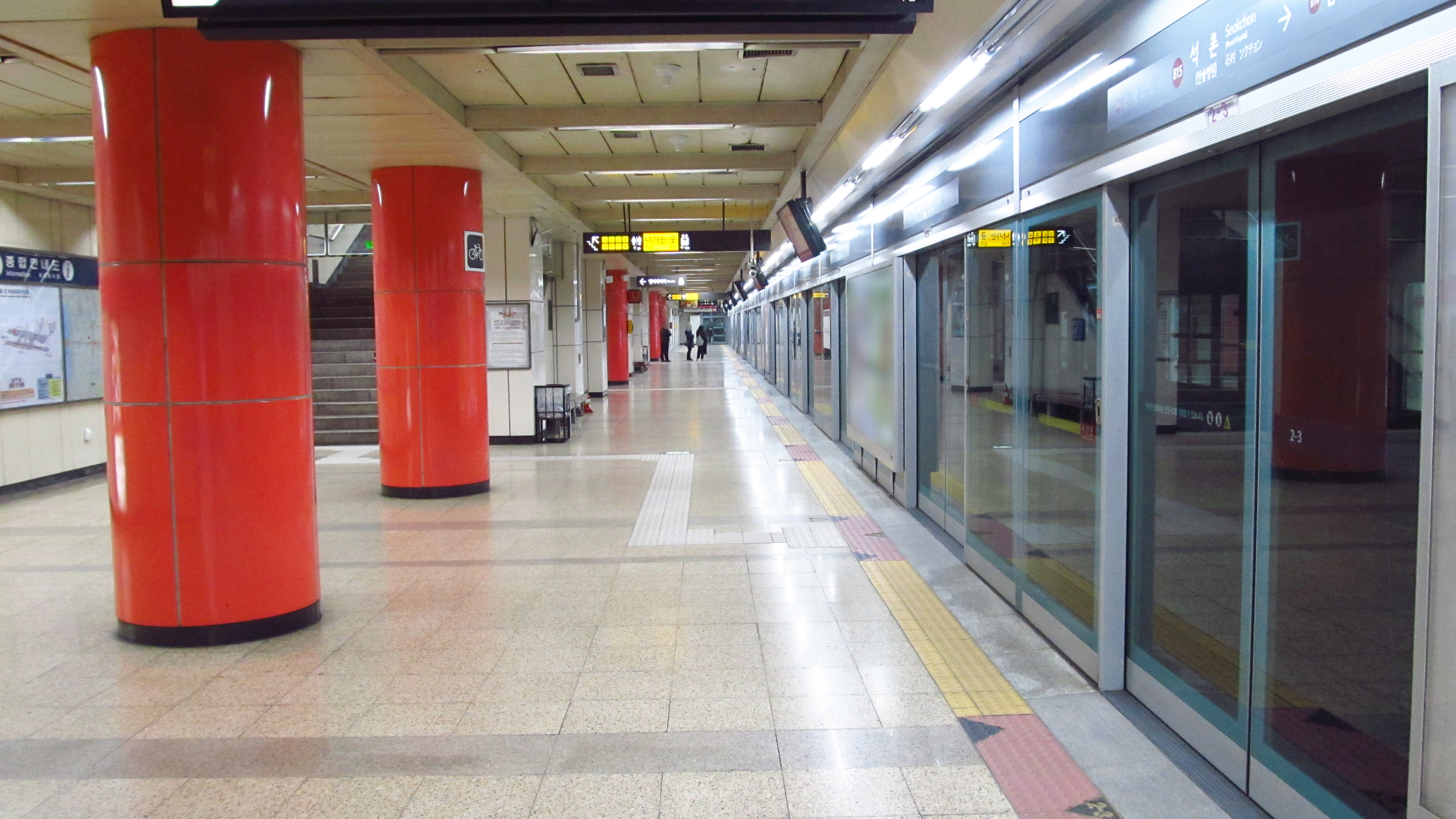
Northbound platform (Line 8)

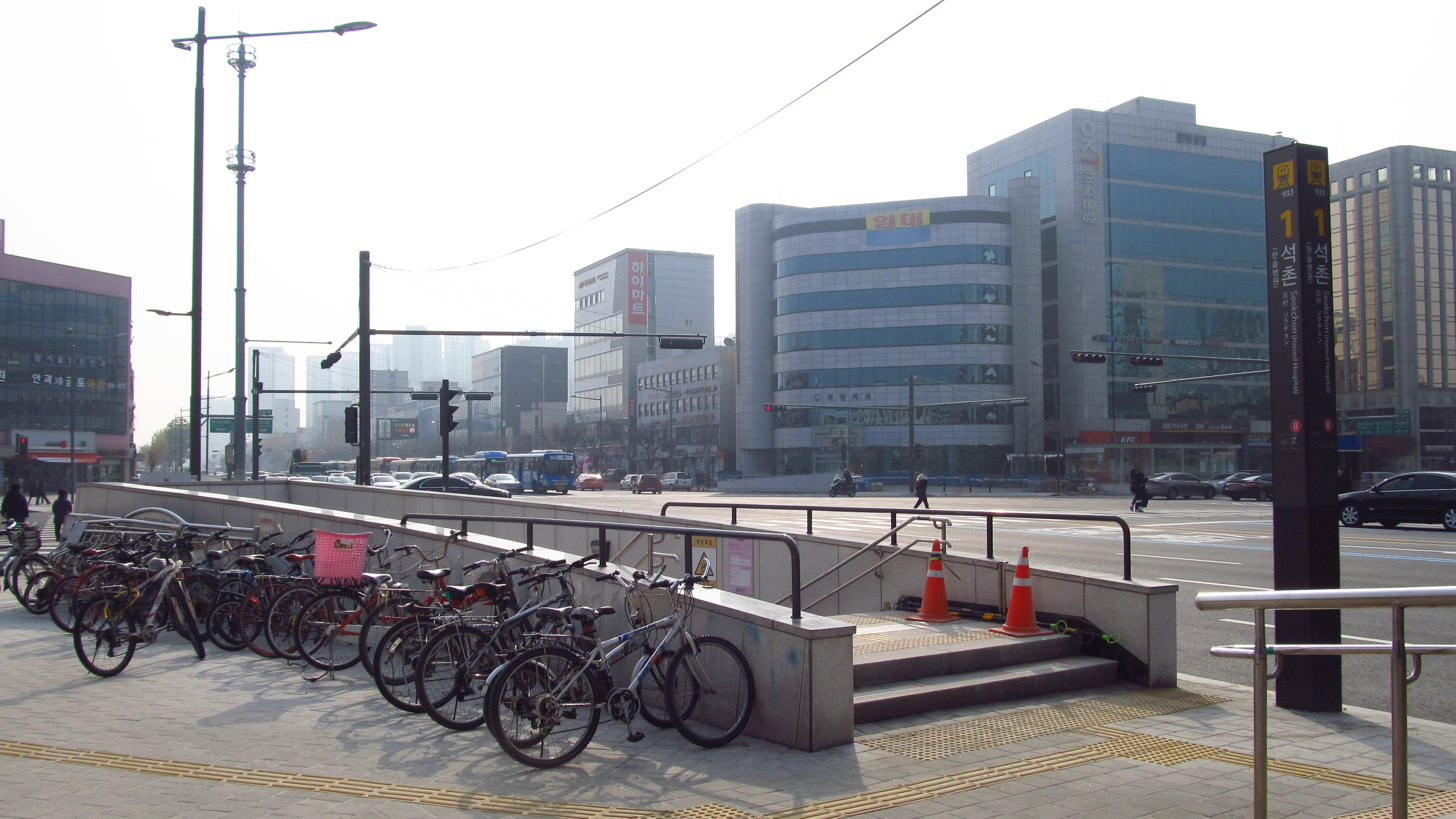
Exit 1

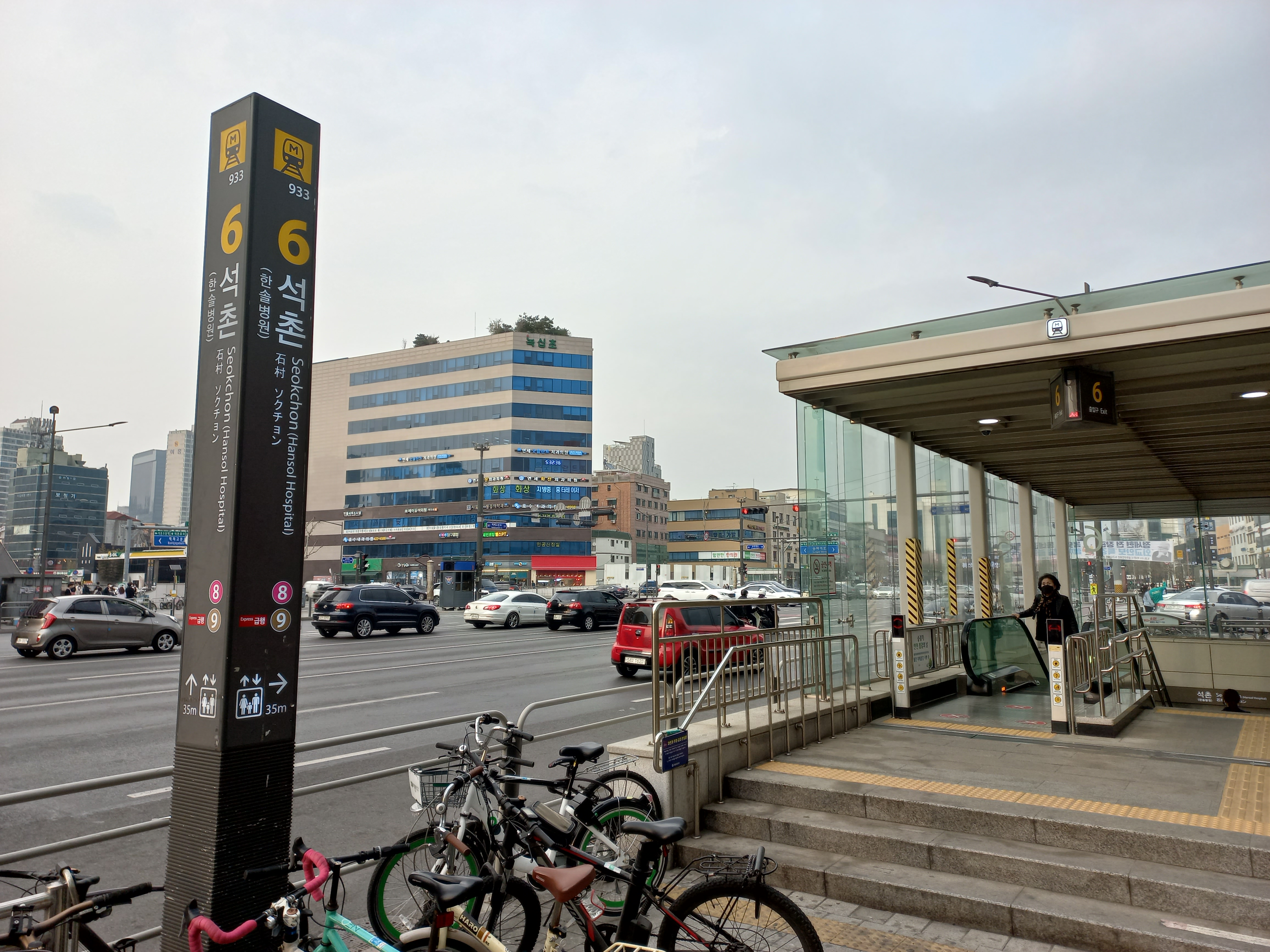
Exit 6

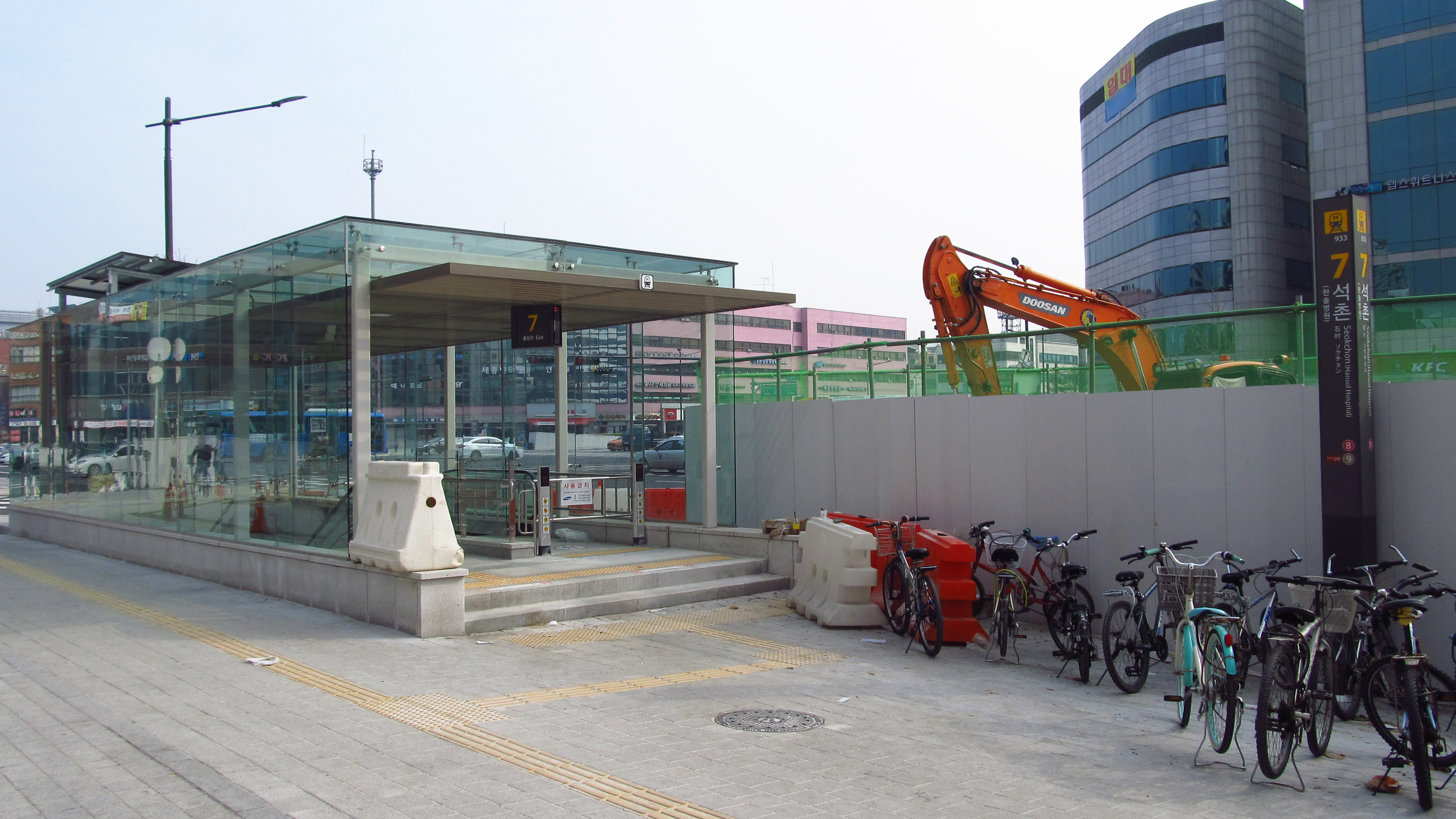
Exit 7

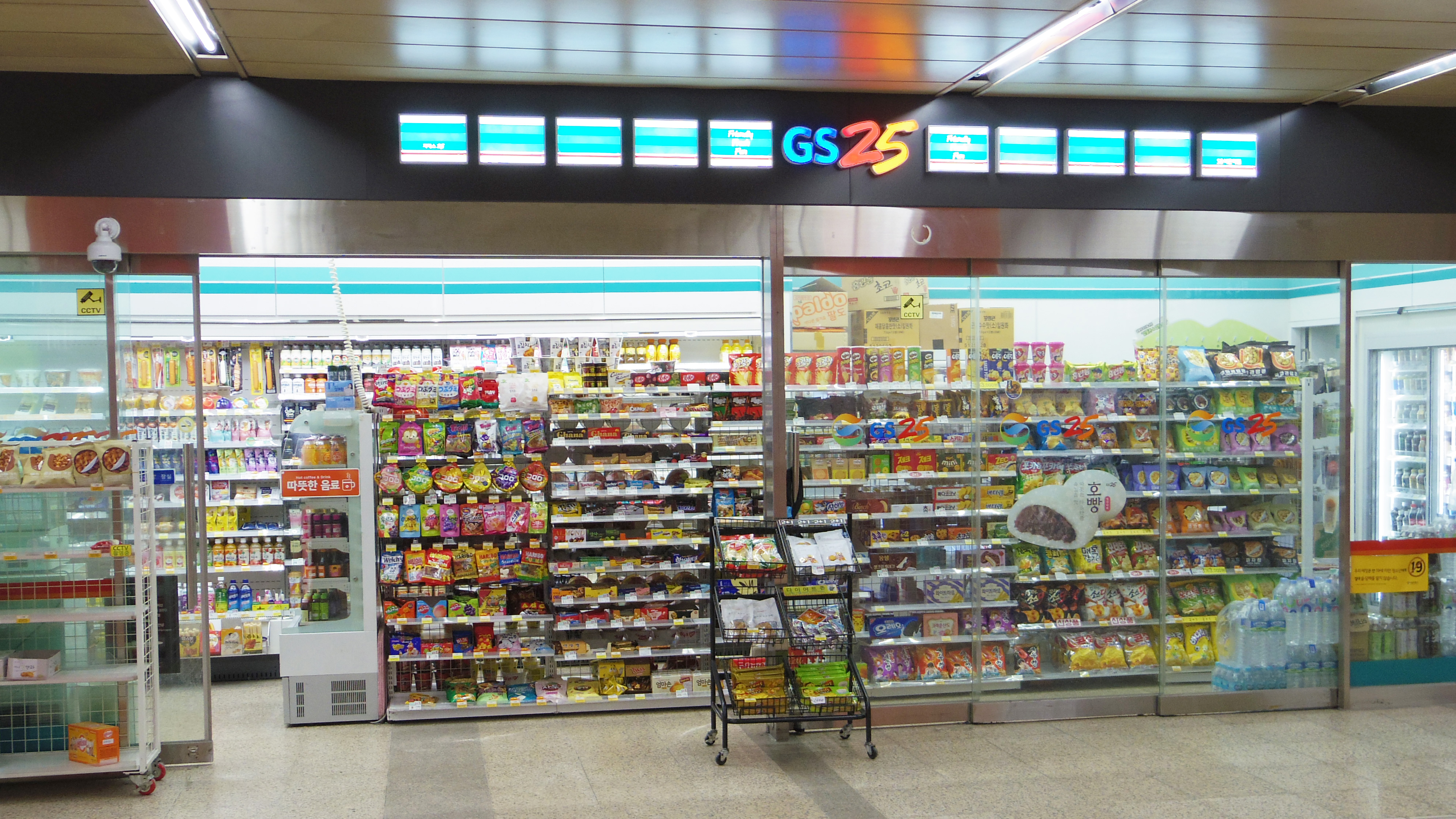
Station branch

Preceding station	Seoul Metropolitan Subway	Following station
Jamsil towards Byeollae	Line 8	Songpa towards Moran
Seokchon Gobun towards Gaehwa	Line 9	Songpanaru towards VHS Medical Center
Sports Complex towards Gimpo International Airport	Line 9 Express	Olympic Park towards VHS Medical Center
