= Songpanaru station =

Station of the Seoul Metropolitan Subway

송파나루; Songpanaru
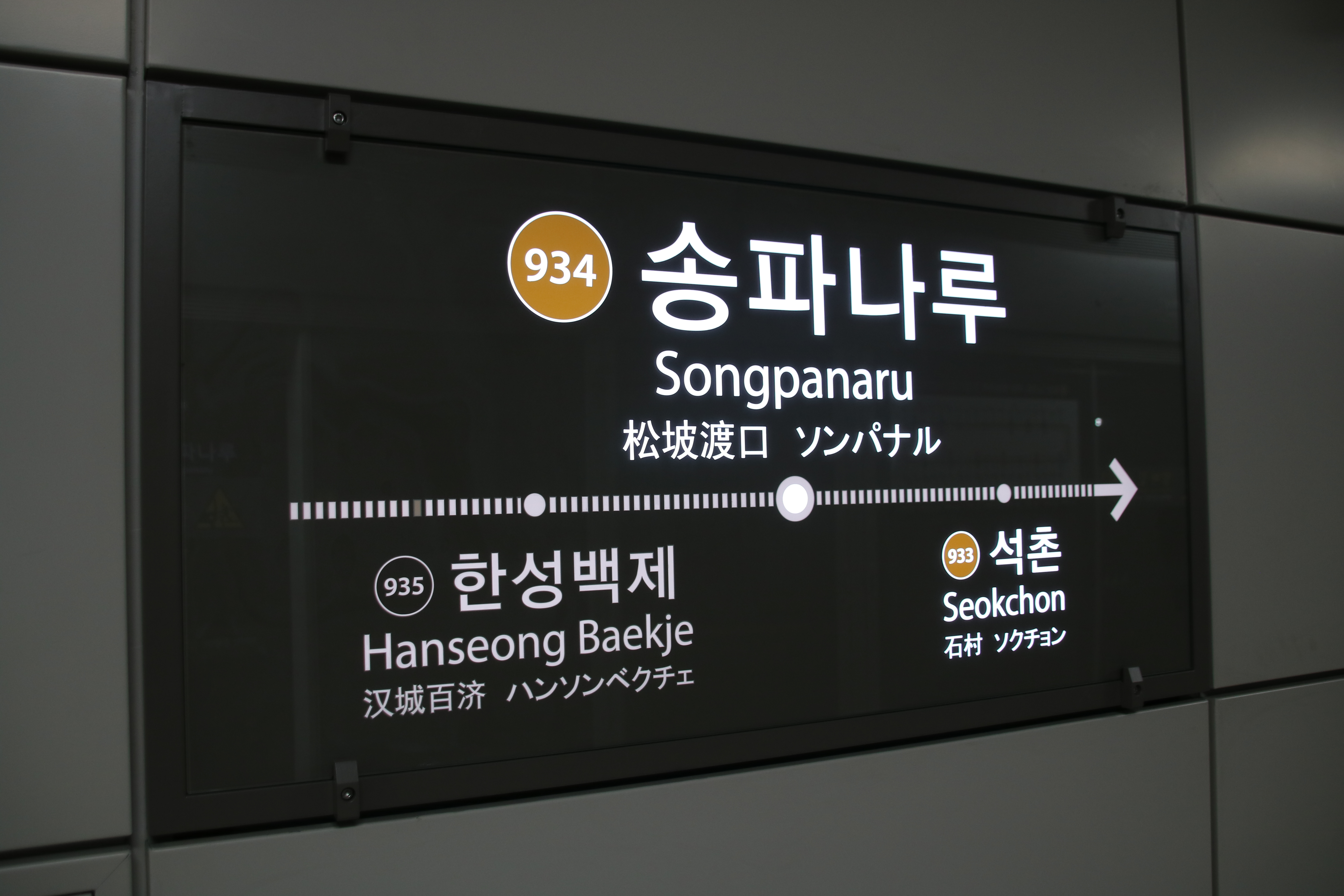
- Station nameplate

Korean name
- Hangul: 송파나루역
- Hanja: 松坡나루驛
- Revised Romanization: Songpanaruyeok
- McCune–Reischauer: Songp'anaruyŏk

General information
- Location: Songpa-gu, Seoul
- Operator: Seoul Metro
- Line: Line 9
- Platforms: 1 island platform
- Tracks: 4 (2 bypass tracks)

Construction
- Structure type: Underground

Key dates
- December 1, 2018: Line 9 opened
Location

Songpanaru is a station on Seoul Subway Line 9. It was opened on December 1, 2018.

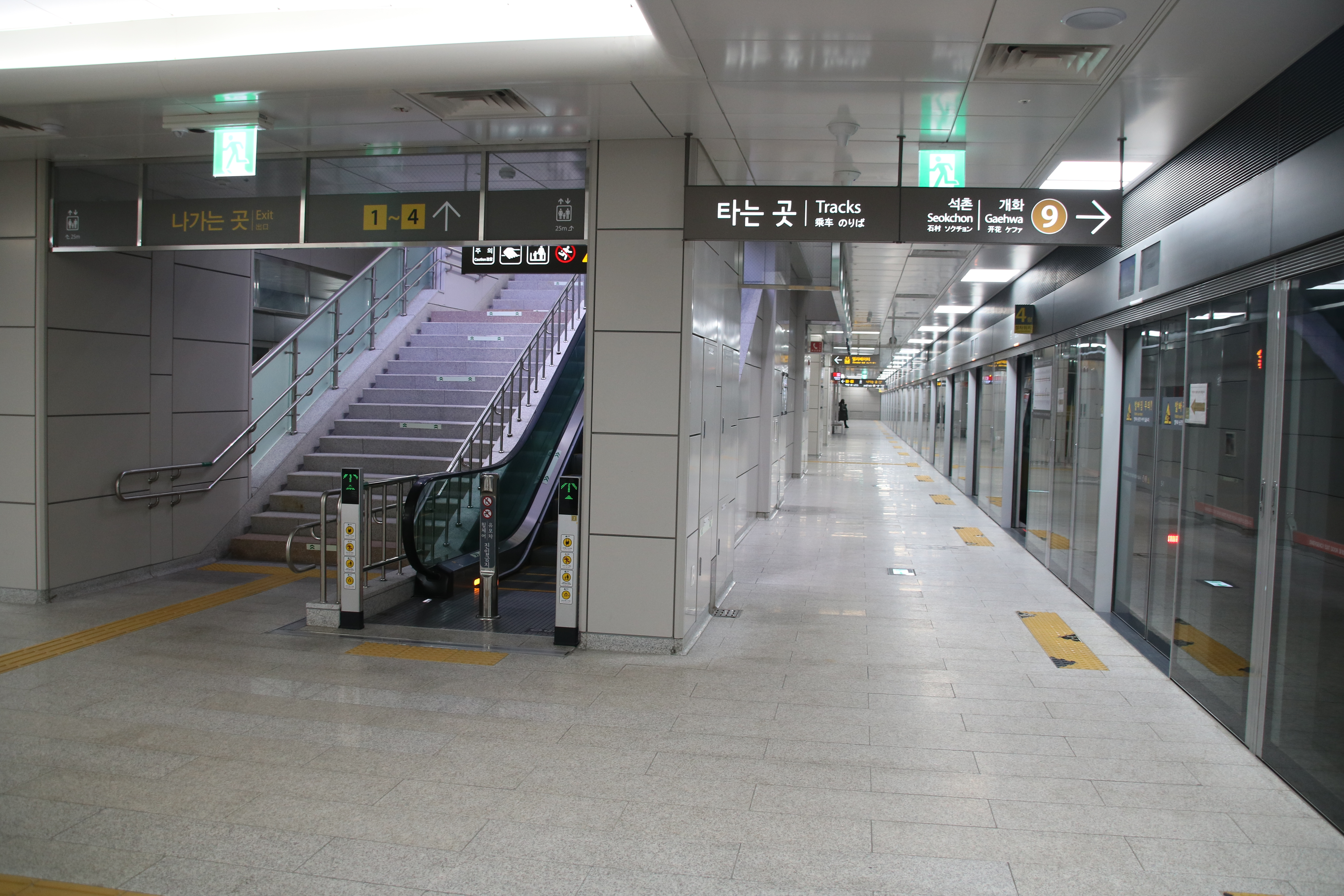
Station platform

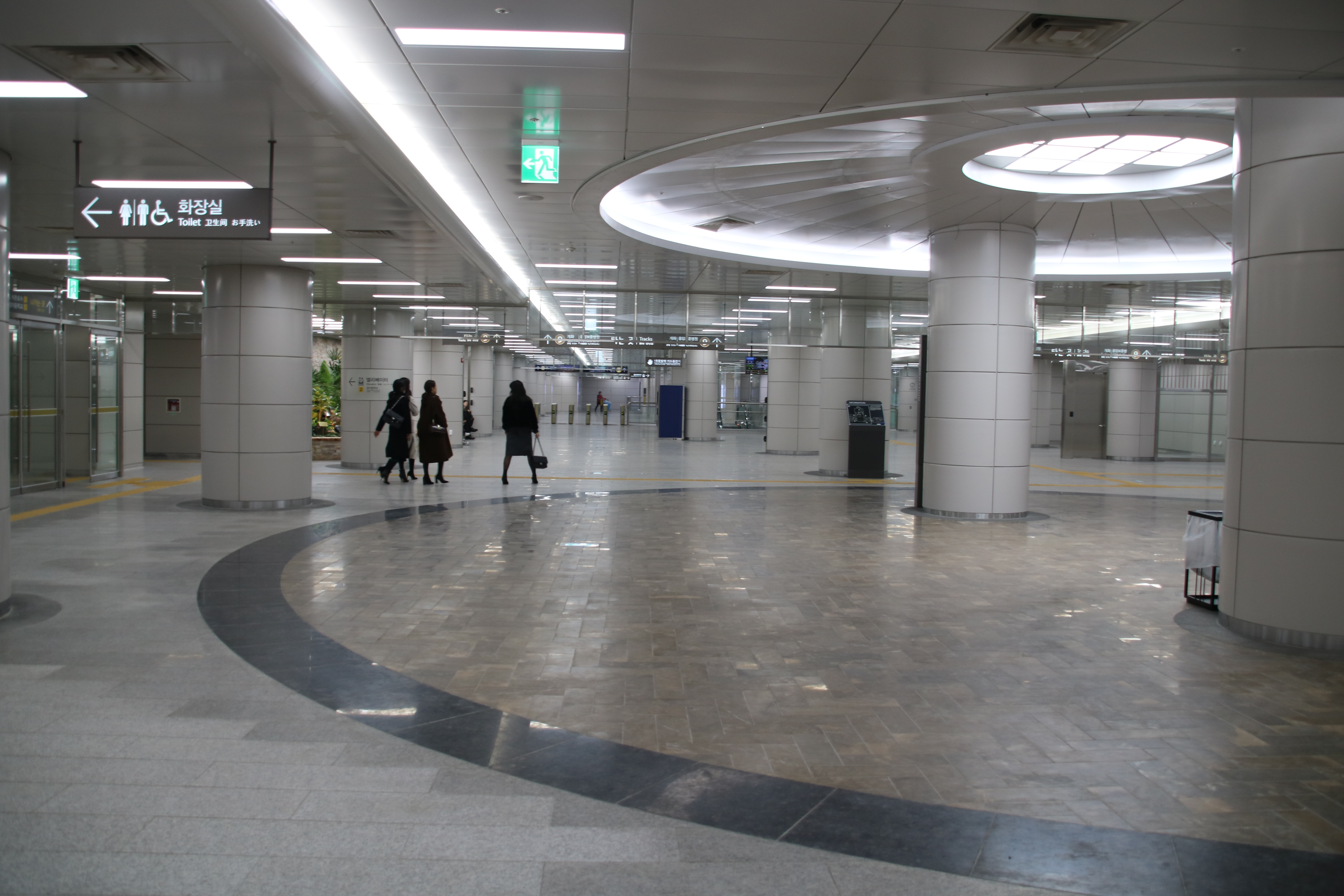
Station concourse

Preceding station	Seoul Metropolitan Subway	Following station
Seokchon towards Gaehwa	Line 9	Hanseong Baekje towards VHS Medical Center
