= Seokchon Gobun station =

Metro station in Seoul, South Korea

석촌고분; Seokchon Gobun
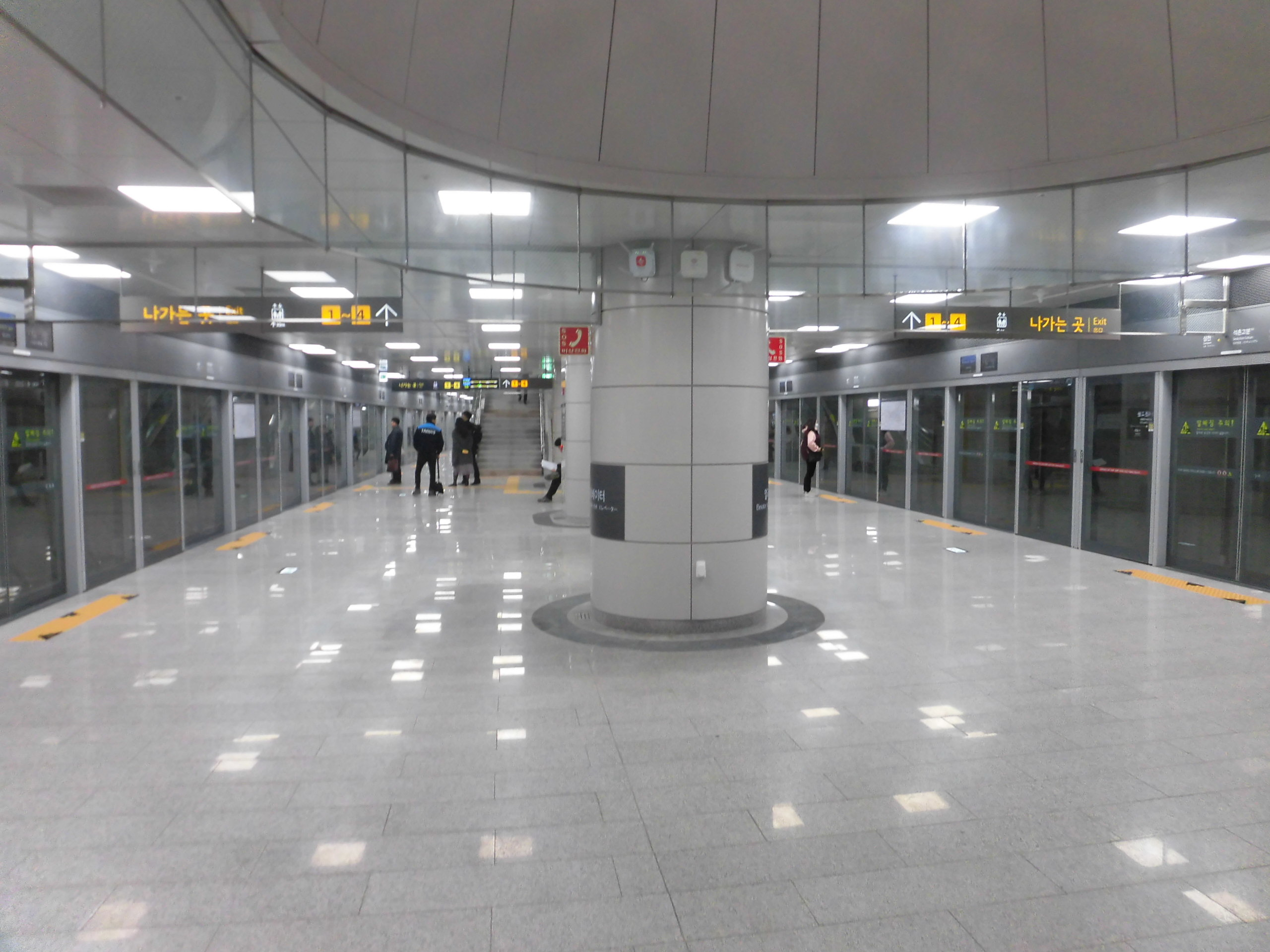
- Station platform

Korean name
- Hangul: 석촌고분역
- Hanja: 石村古墳驛
- Revised Romanization: Seokchongobunnyeok
- McCune–Reischauer: Sŏkch'ongobunnyŏk

General information
- Location: Songpa-gu, Seoul
- Operator: Seoul Metro
- Line: Line 9
- Platforms: 1 island platform
- Tracks: 2

Construction
- Structure type: Underground

Key dates
- December 1, 2018: Line 9 opened
Location

Seokchon Gobun Station is a railway station on Seoul Subway Line 9. It opened on December 1, 2018.

Preceding station	Seoul Metropolitan Subway	Following station
Samjeon towards Gaehwa	Line 9	Seokchon towards VHS Medical Center
