= Samjeon station =

Metro station in Seoul, South Korea

삼전; Samjeon
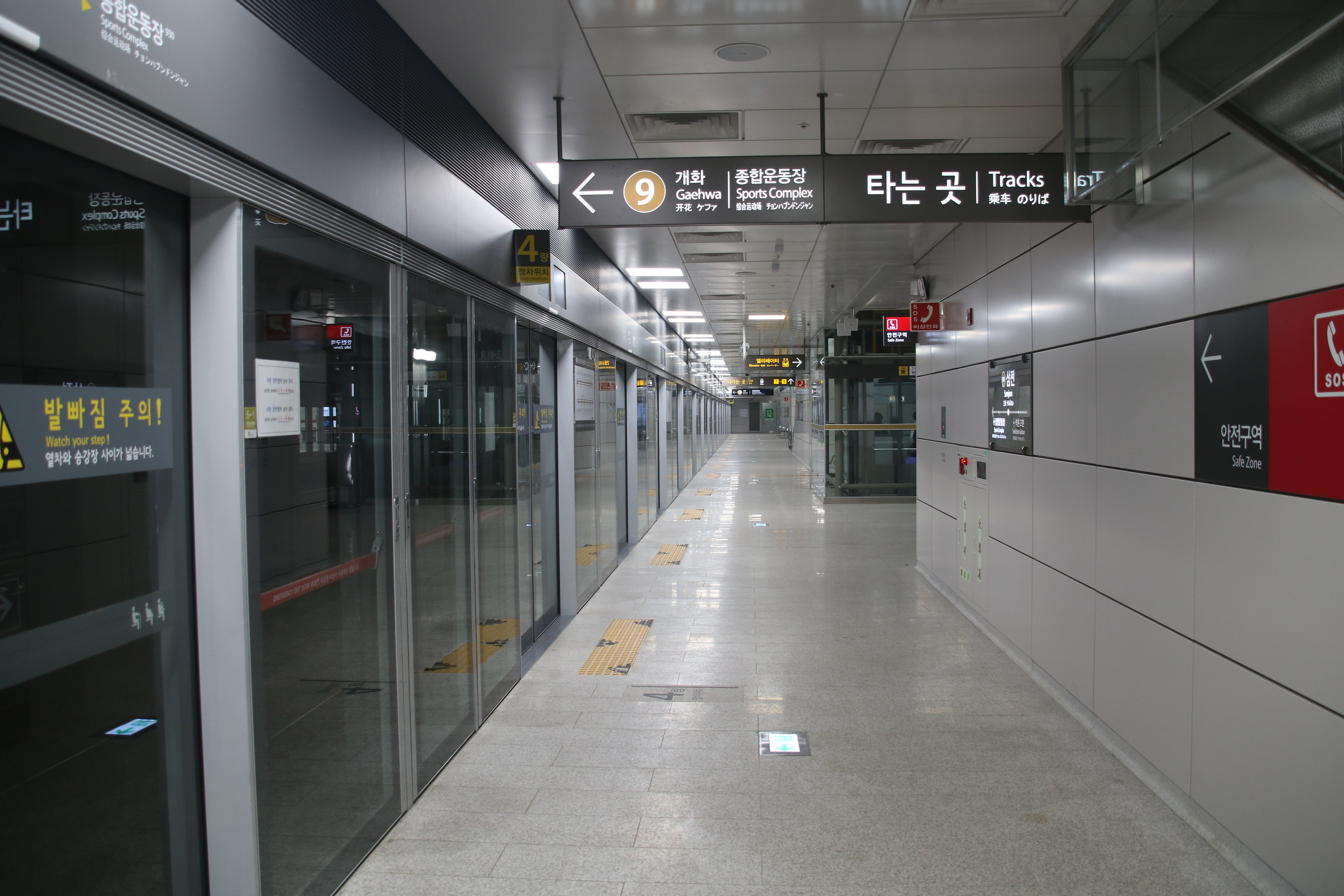
- Station platform

Korean name
- Hangul: 삼전역
- Hanja: 三田驛
- Revised Romanization: Samjeonnyeok
- McCune–Reischauer: Samjŏnnyŏk

General information
- Location: Songpa-gu, Seoul
- Operator: Seoul Metro
- Line: Line 9
- Platforms: 2 side platforms
- Tracks: 4 (2 bypass tacks)

Construction
- Structure type: Underground

Key dates
- December 1, 2018: Line 9 opened
Location

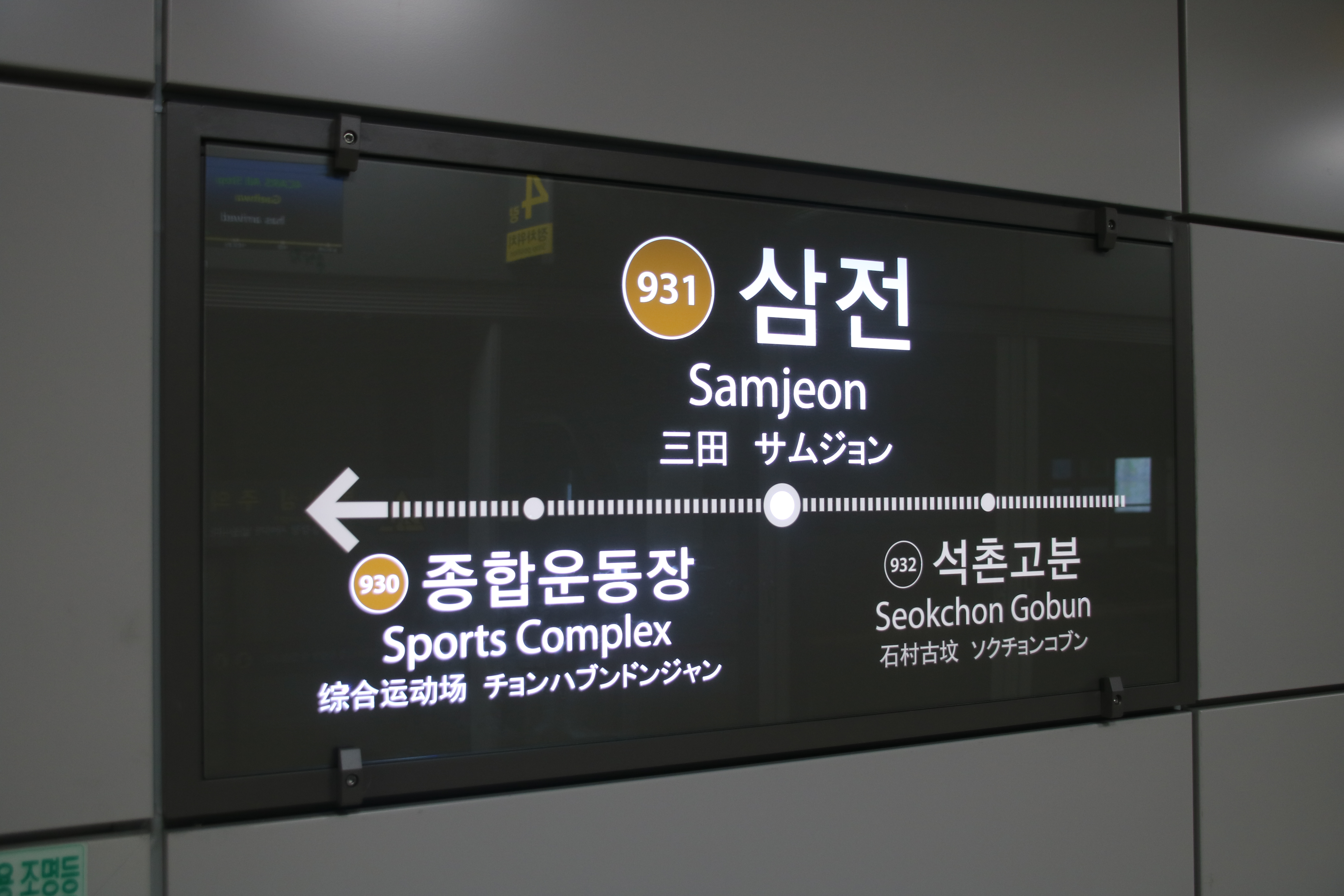
Station nameplate

Samjeon Station is a railway station on Seoul Subway Line 9. It is opened on December 1, 2018.

Preceding station	Seoul Metropolitan Subway	Following station
Sports Complex towards Gaehwa	Line 9	Seokchon Gobun towards VHS Medical Center
