= Songpa station =

Station of the Seoul Metropolitan Subway

Coordinates: 37.499742°N 127.112197°E

송파; Songpa
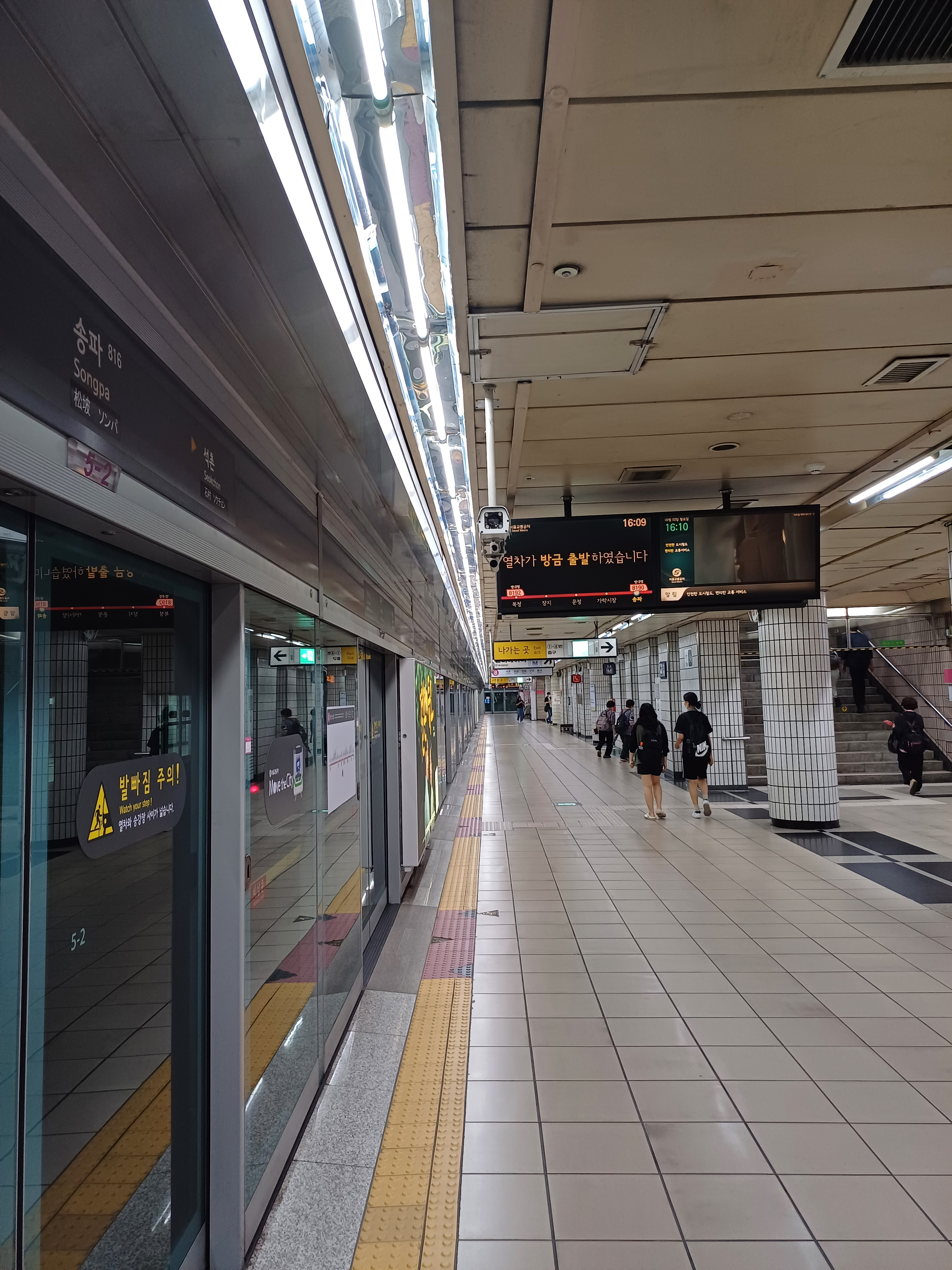

Korean name
- Hangul: 송파역
- Hanja: 松坡驛
- Revised Romanization: Songpa-yeok
- McCune–Reischauer: Songp'a-yŏk

General information
- Location: 479 Garak-dong, Songpa-gu, Seoul
- Operator: Seoul Metro
- Line: Line 8
- Platforms: 2
- Tracks: 2

Construction
- Structure type: Underground

Key dates
- November 23, 1996: Line 8 opened
Location

Songpa is a station on the Seoul Subway Line 8.

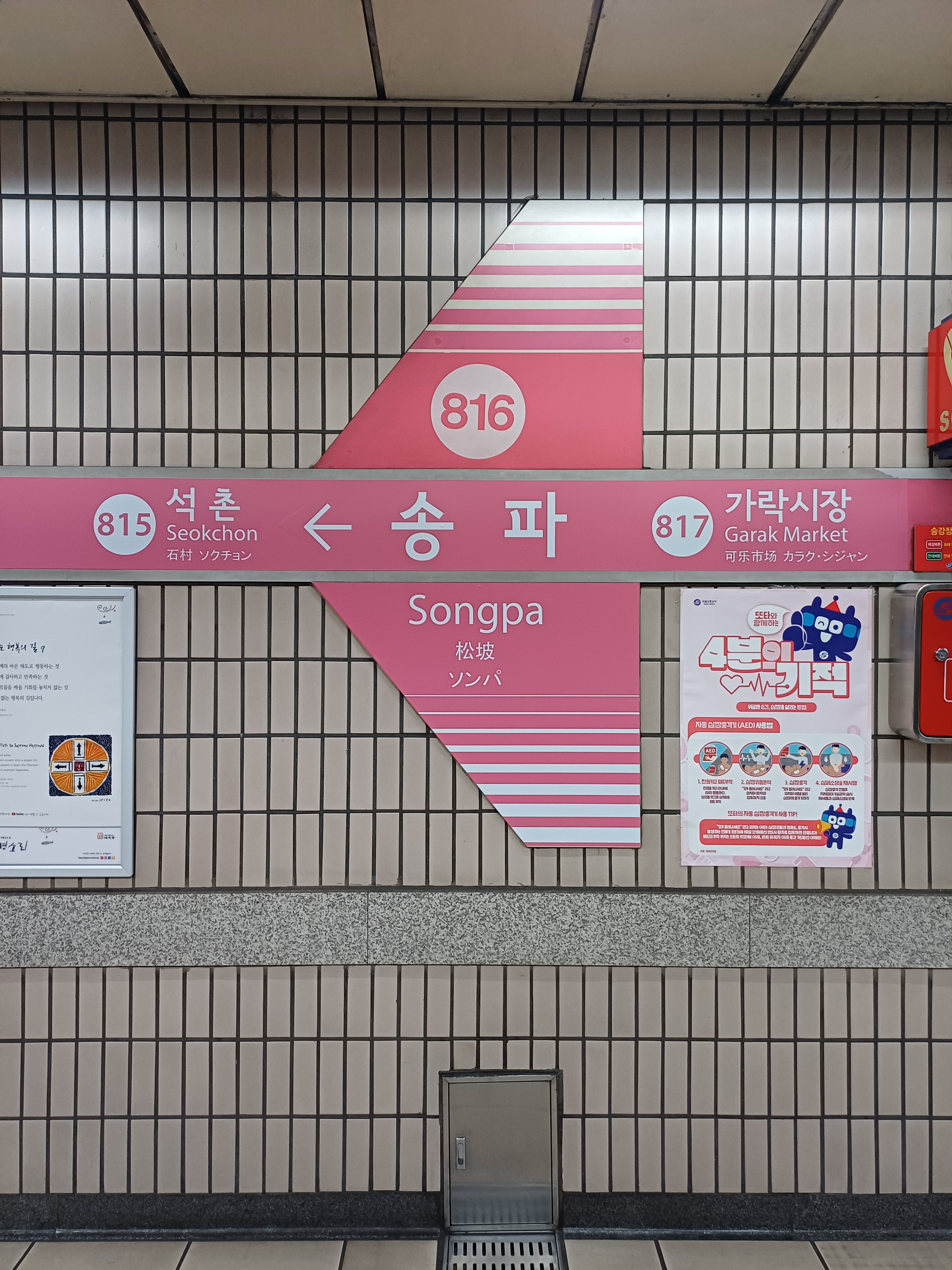
Station nameplate

== Vicinity ==
- Exit 1 : Jamsil Girls' High School
- Exit 2 : Jungdae Elementary School
- Exit 3 : Garak Market
- Exit 4 : Garak Elementary School

== Station layout ==
Seokchon ↑
S/B | | N/B
↓ Garak Market

Northbound	← ● Line 8 toward Byeollae
Southbound	● Line 8 toward Moran →

Preceding station	Seoul Metropolitan Subway	Following station
Seokchon towards Byeollae	Line 8	Garak Market towards Moran
