= Seoul Sports Complex =

Sports venue in Seoul, South Korea

- 서울종합운동장
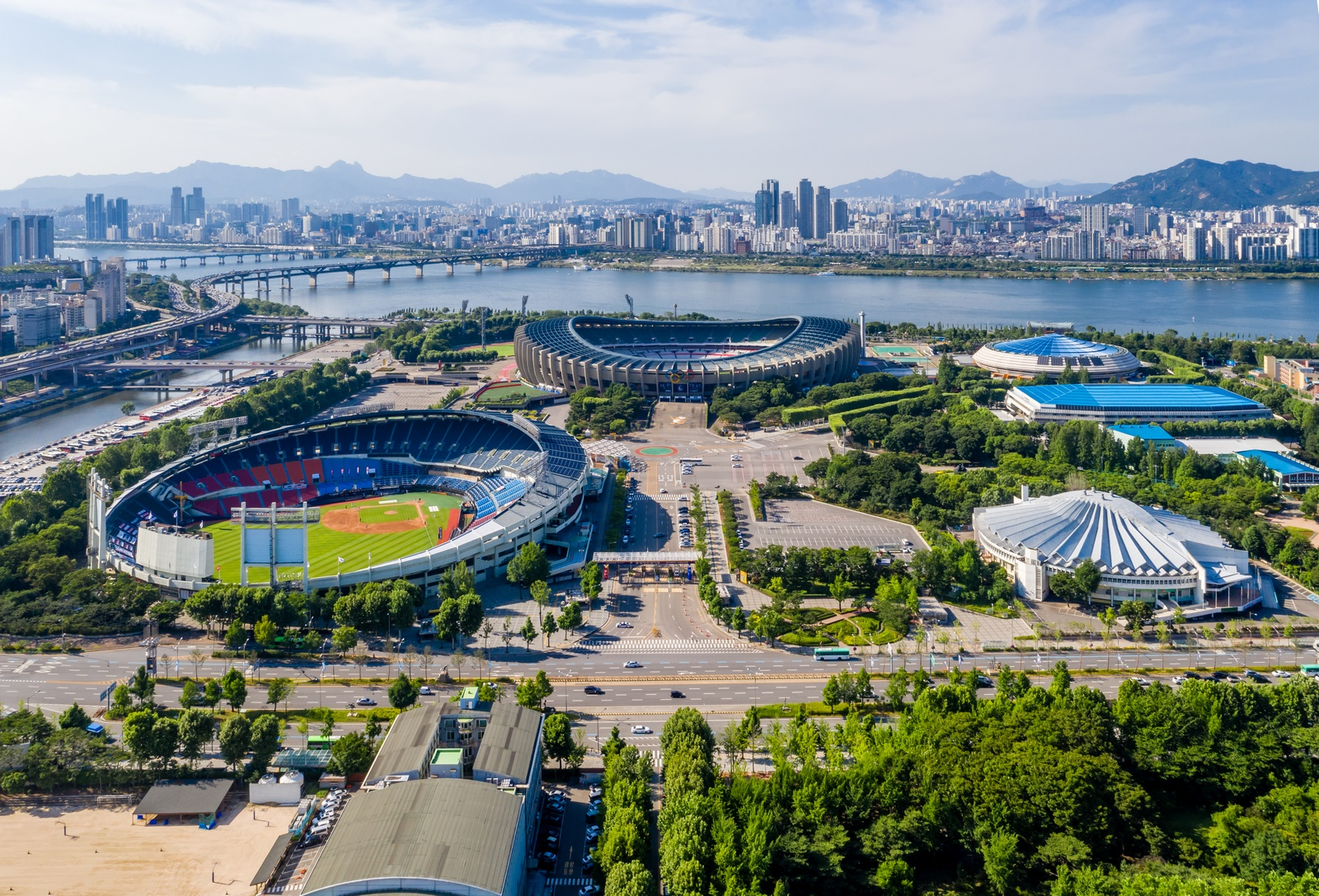
- Seoul Sports Complex in 2020
- Interactive map of the Seoul Sports Complex area

General information
- Location: 25 Olympic-ro, Songpa-gu, Seoul Sports Complex, Songpa District, Seoul, South Korea
- Coordinates: 37°30′50″N 127°04′25″E

Website
- stadium.seoul.go.kr

- Seoul Sports Complex
- Hangul: 서울종합운동장
- RR: Seoul jonghap undongjang
- MR: Sŏul chonghap undongjang

Seoul Sports Complex (Korean: 서울종합운동장), a.k.a. "Jamsil Sports Complex" (Korean: 잠실종합운동장), is a group of sports facilities in Songpa-gu in Seoul, South Korea. It was built for the 1986 Asian Games and 1988 Summer Olympics from December 1976 to September 1984. The complex is South Korea's largest integrated sports center, spanning an area of 402,816 m^{2}. The complex consists of the Olympic Stadium, Auxiliary Stadium, Jamsil Arena, Jamsil Baseball Stadium, Jamsil Indoor Swimming Pool, Jamsil Inline Skating Rink and the Sports Park.

== Facilities ==
Close-up view of Seoul Olympic Stadium

- Seoul Olympic Stadium
- Auxiliary Stadium
- Jamsil Baseball Stadium
- Jamsil Arena
- Jamsil Students' Gymnasium
- Jamsil Indoor Swimming Pool

== Transportation ==
- Sports Complex station on Subway Line 2

== Events ==
- 19 August 2012: American rapper Eminem concert with an audience of 20,000
- 2008: American pop rock band Maroon 5's first Korean tour and concert, a part of It Won't Be Soon Before Long Tour
- 2011: American pop rock band Maroon 5's first concert of the second Korean tour, a part of Hands All Over Tour.
- 2012: American pop rock band Maroon 5's second concert of the third Korean tour, a part of Overexposed Tour.
- Seoul ePrix
