= Jamsil-dong =

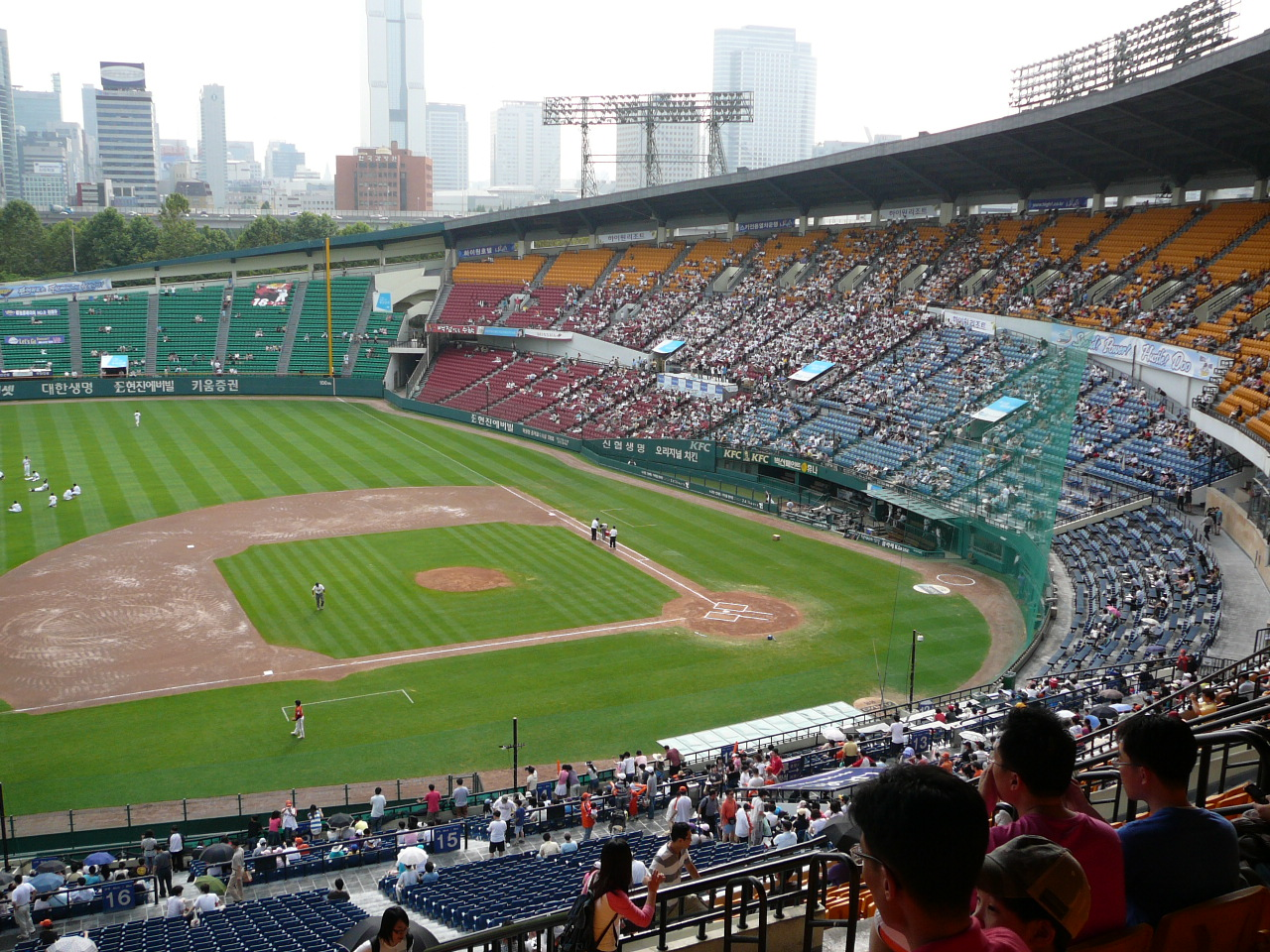
- Jamsil Baseball Stadium located in Jamsil 1-dong

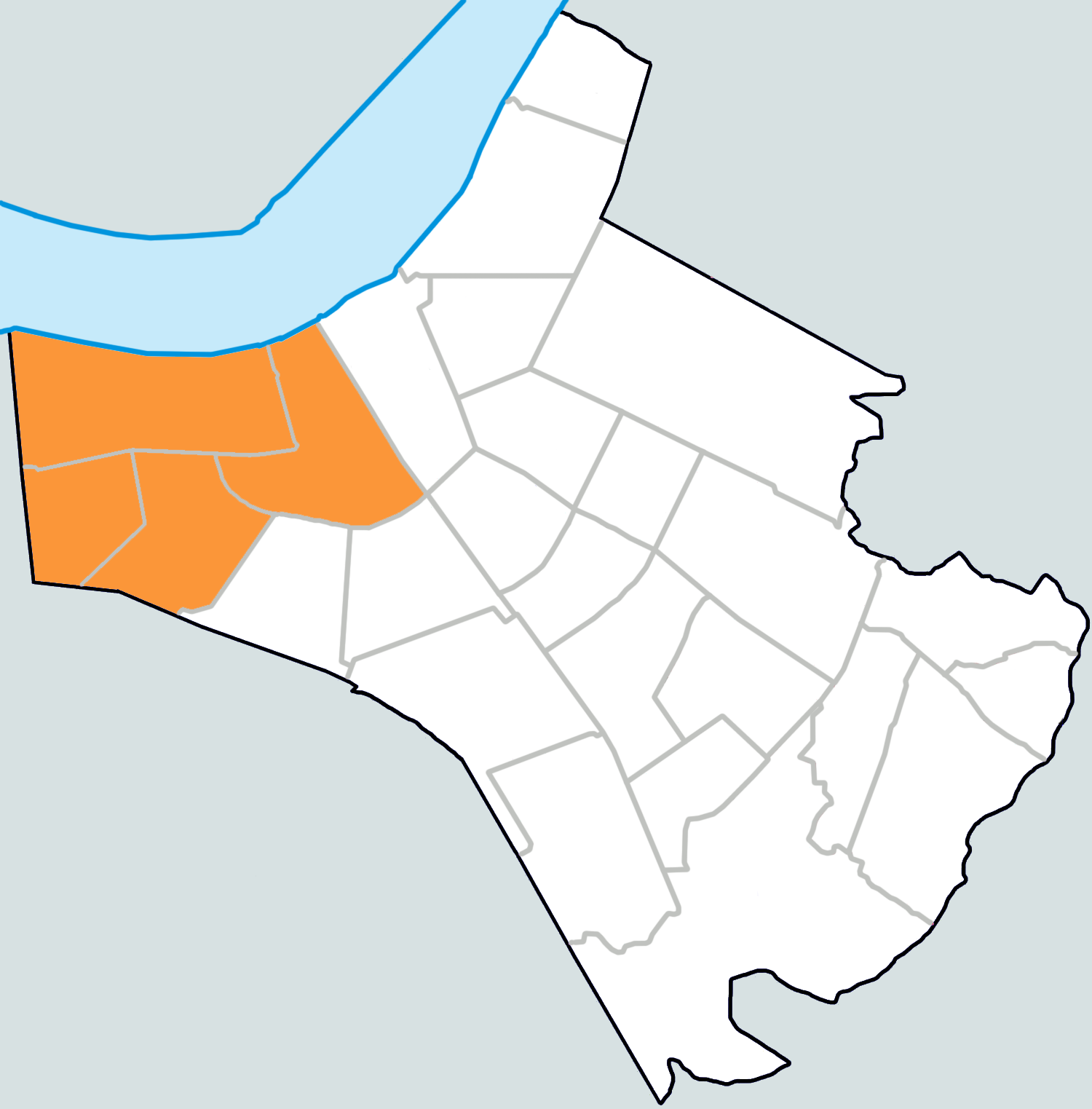
- Country: South Korea

Area
  - Total: 5.21 km^{2} (2.01 sq mi)

Population (2013)
  - Total: 115,739
  - Density: 22,200/km^{2} (57,500/sq mi)

Korean name
- Hangul: 잠실동
- Hanja: 蠶室洞
- RR: Jamsil-dong
- MR: Chamsil-tong

Jamsil-dong (Korean: 잠실동) is a dong (neighborhood) of Songpa District, Seoul, South Korea. Its name is derived from silkworm breeding during the Joseon period. Jamsil translates to a room or place for sericulture ("jam" is silkworm, "sil" is room). The state encouraged people to raise silkworms, so founded Dongjamsil (동잠실, literally "east place for sericulture") in the east vicinity of Seoul.

Today, it has developed into one of Seoul's major transportation hubs, served by both subway and bus routes connecting to various areas.

== Attractions ==
- Lotte World
- Jamsil Baseball Stadium
- Jamsil Hangang Park
- Sincheon

== Education ==
Schools located in Jamsil-dong:

- Seoul Beodeul Elementary School
- Seoul Jamil Elementary School
- Seoul Jamjeon Elementary School
- Seoul Jamsin Elementary School
- Seoul Sincheon Elementary School
- Seoul Songjeon Elementary School
- Aju Middle School
- Chungshin Girls' Middle School
- Jamsin Middle School
- Sincheon Middle School
- Chungshin Girls' High School
- Jamil High School
- Jamsin High School
- Youngdongil High School

== Transportation ==
- Jamsil Station of and of
- Jamsilsaenae Station (formally Sincheon Station) of
- Sports Complex station of

== Gallery ==
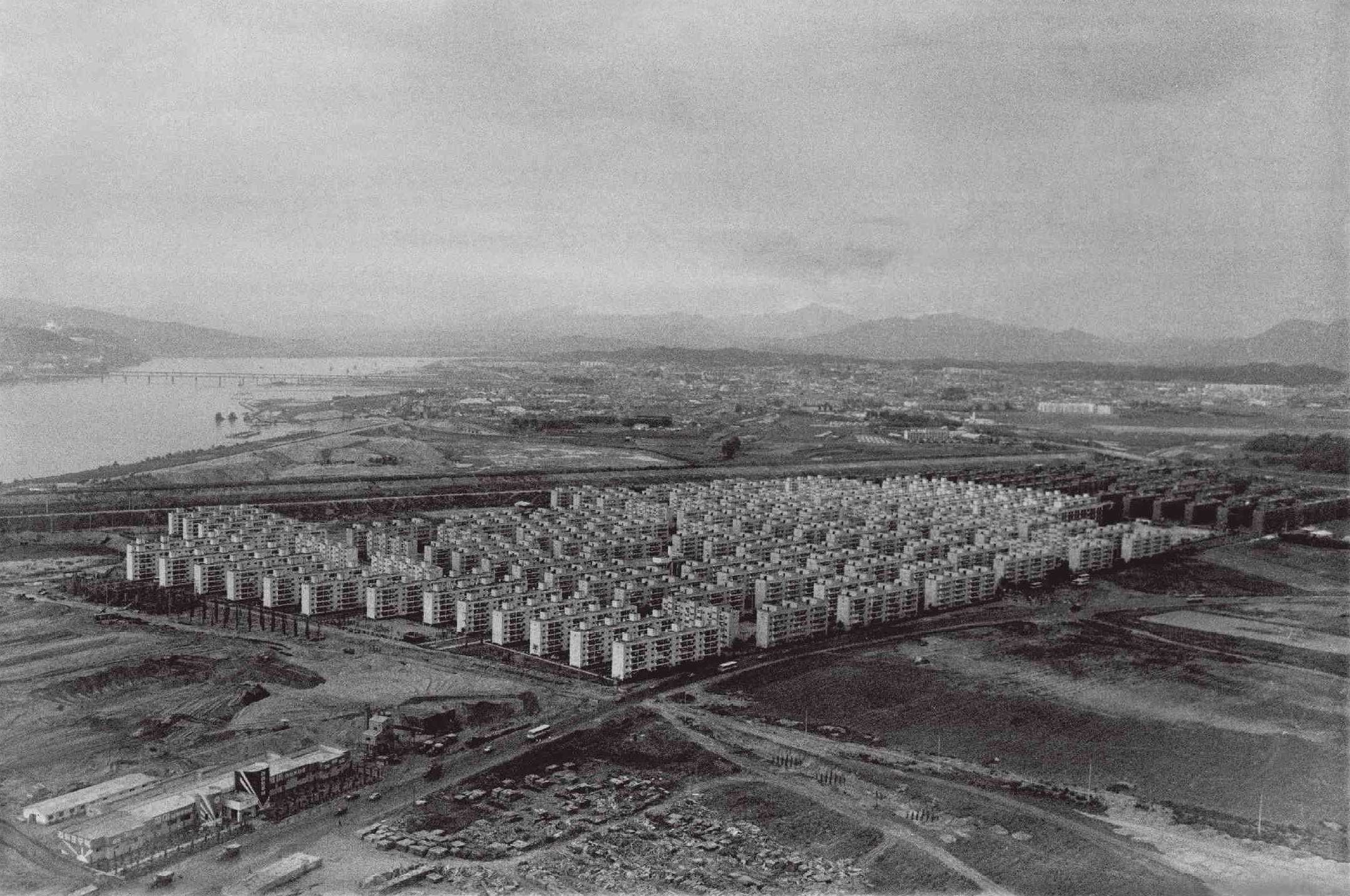
Newly developed Jamsil-dong in 1978

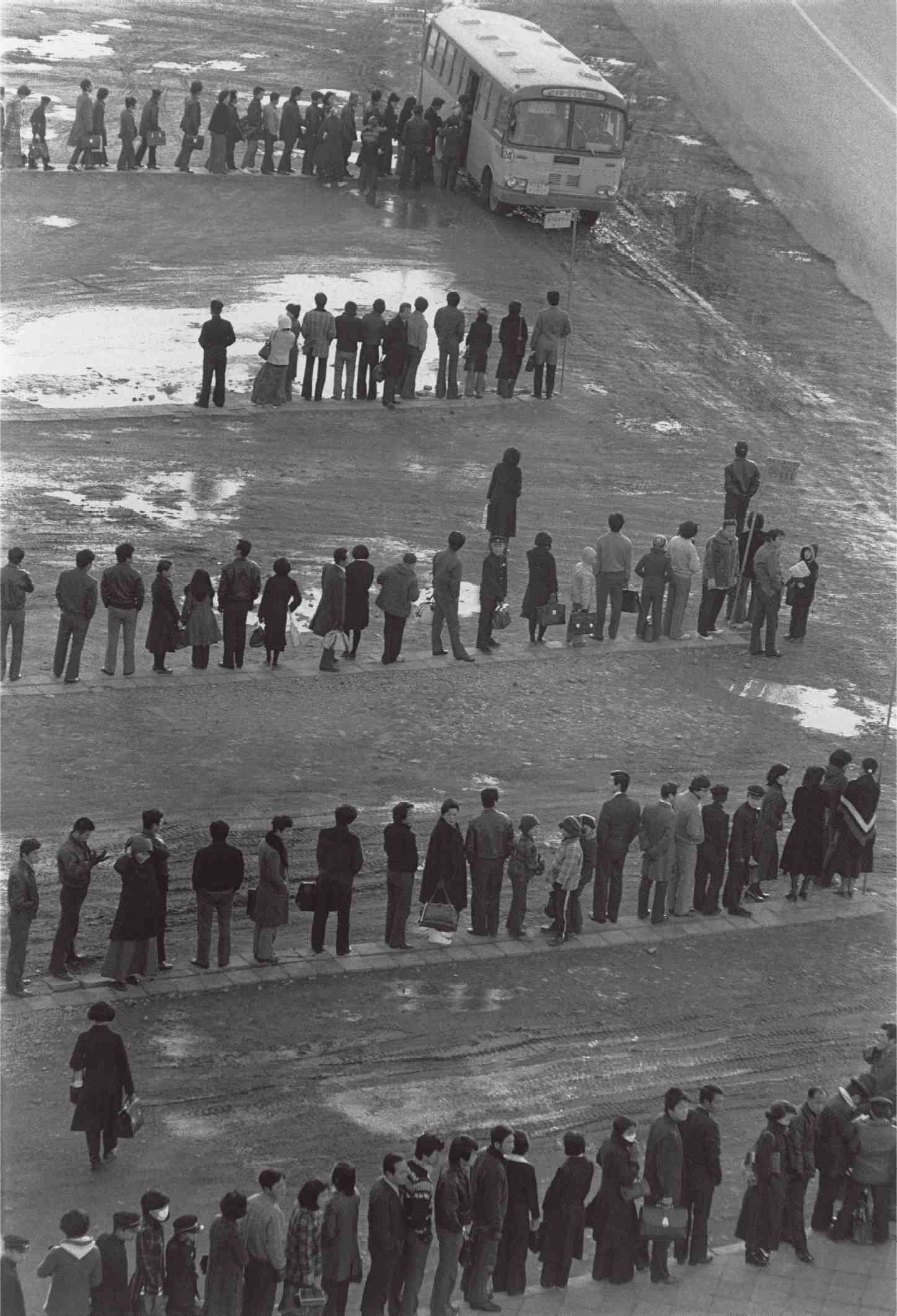
Bus station in Jamsil-dong in 1976

== See also ==
- Administrative divisions of South Korea
