= Nodeul station =

Railway station on line 9 of the Seoul Subway

Coordinates: 37°30′47″N 126°57′11″E

노들; Nodeul
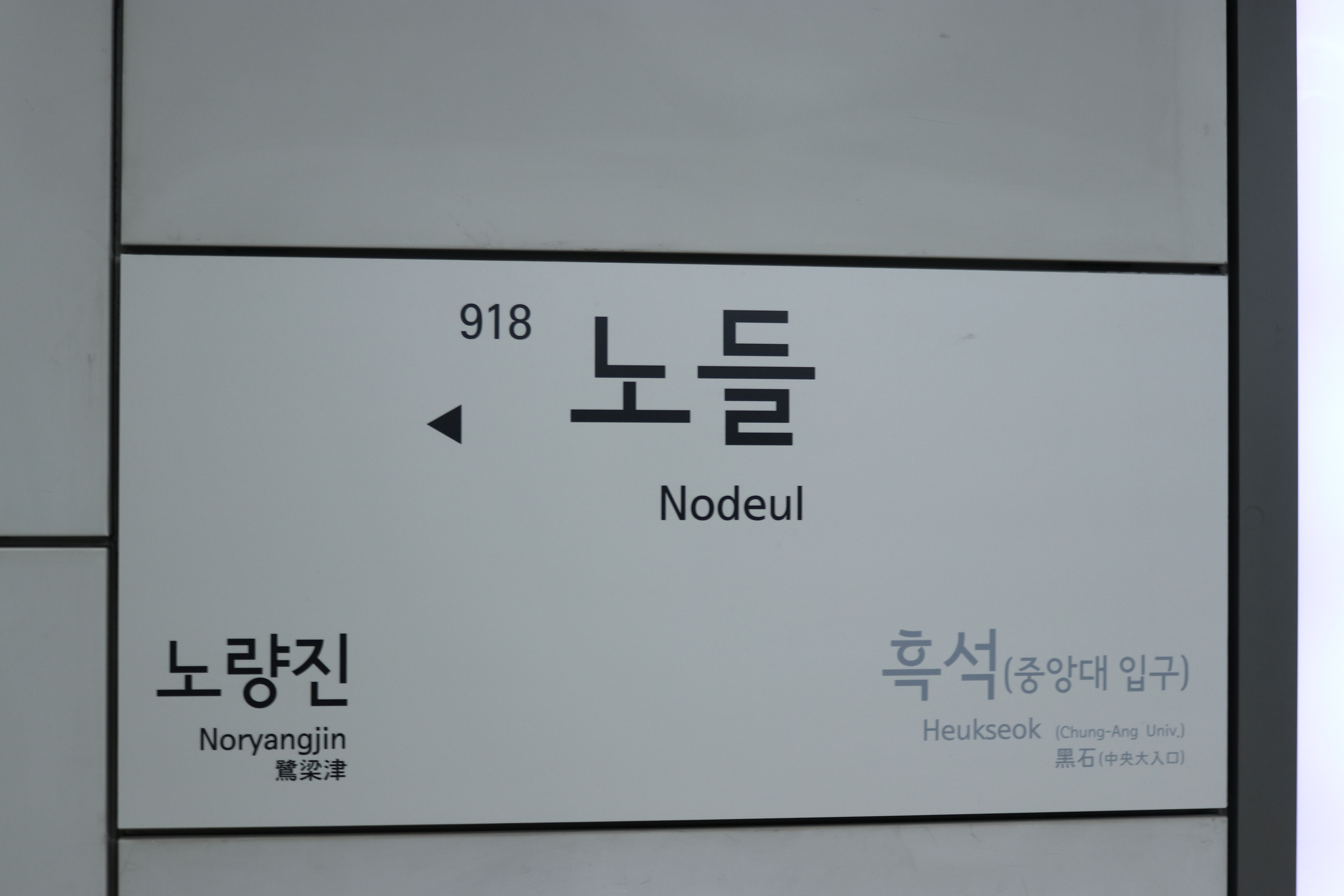
- Station sign

Korean name
- Hangul: 노들역
- Hanja: 노들驛
- Revised Romanization: Nodeul-yeok
- McCune–Reischauer: Nodŭl-yŏk

General information
- Location: 148 Bon-dong; Dongjak-gu, Seoul
- Operator: Seoul Metro Line 9 Corporation
- Line: Line 9
- Platforms: 2 (2 side platforms)
- Tracks: 2

Construction
- Structure type: Underground

History
- Opened: July 24, 2009
Location

Nodeul Station is a railway station on Line 9 of the Seoul Subway.

== Station layout ==
G	Street level	Exit

L1; Concourse	Lobby	Customer Service, Shops, Vending machines, ATMs

L2; Platform level	Side platform, doors will open on the right
L2; Platform level	Westbound	← Line 9 Local toward Gaehwa (Noryangjin) ← Line 9 Express does not stop here
L2; Platform level	Eastbound	Line 9 Local toward VHS Medical Center (Heukseok) → Line 9 Express does not stop here →
L2; Platform level	Side platform, doors will open on the right

Preceding station	Seoul Metropolitan Subway	Following station
Noryangjin towards Gaehwa	Line 9	Heukseok towards VHS Medical Center
