= Sinhyeon station =

Train station in Siheung, South Korea

신현; Sinhyeon
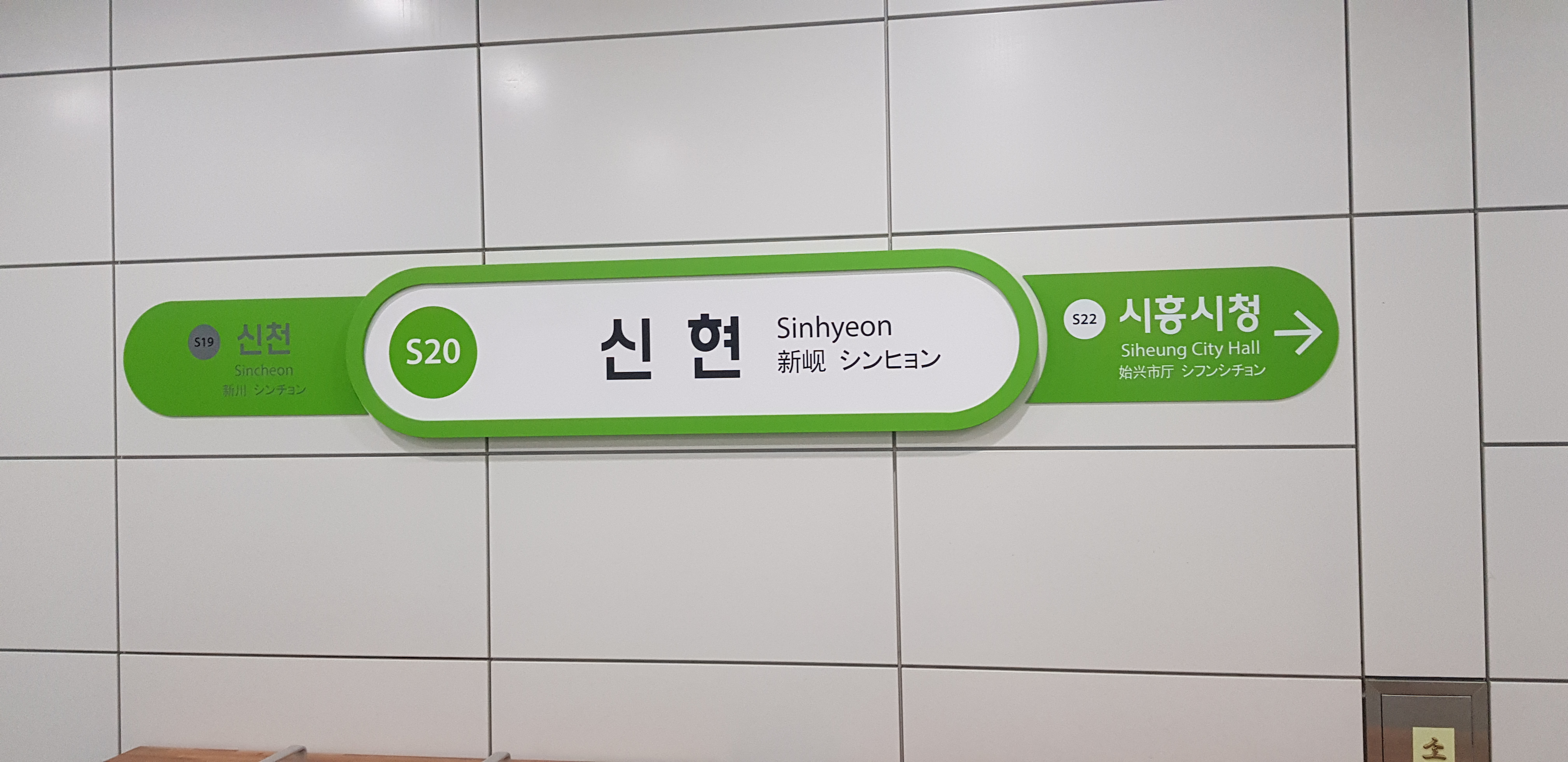
- Station nameplate

Korean name
- Hangul: 신현역
- Hanja: 新峴驛
- RR: Sinhyeon-yeok
- MR: Sinhyŏn-yŏk

General information
- Location: Siheung, Gyeonggi-do
- Operator: Korail; SEO HAE RAIL CO., LTD.
- Line: Seohae Line
- Platforms: 2 (2 side platforms)
- Tracks: 2

Construction
- Structure type: Underground

History
- Opened: June 16, 2018
Location

Sinhyeon station is a station on the Seohae Line in South Korea. It opened on June 16, 2018.

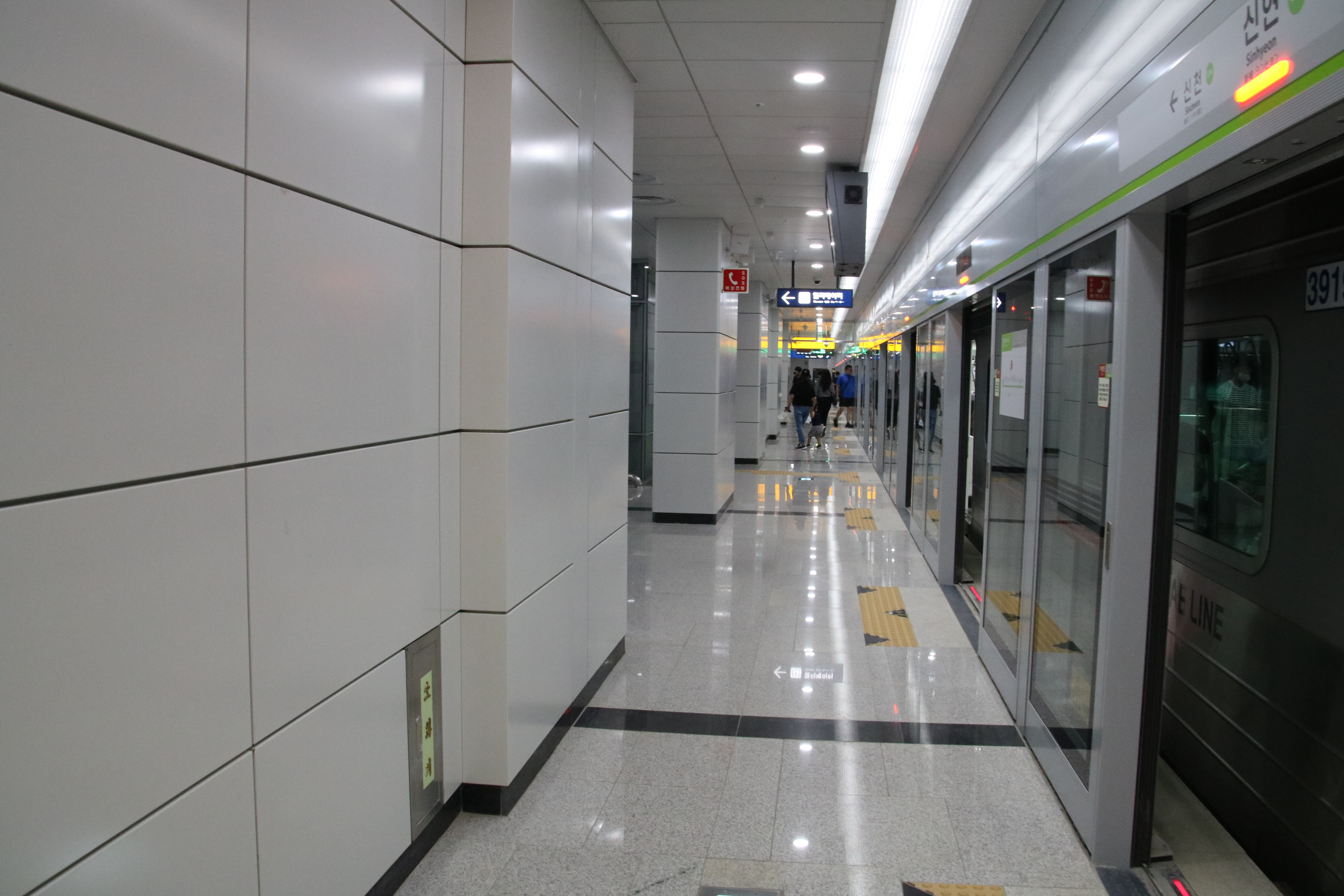
Station platform

Preceding station	Seoul Metropolitan Subway	Following station
Sincheon towards Ilsan	Seohae Line	Siheung City Hall towards Wonsi
