= Neunggok station =

Metro station in Goyang, South Korea

능곡; Neunggok
능곡; Neunggok
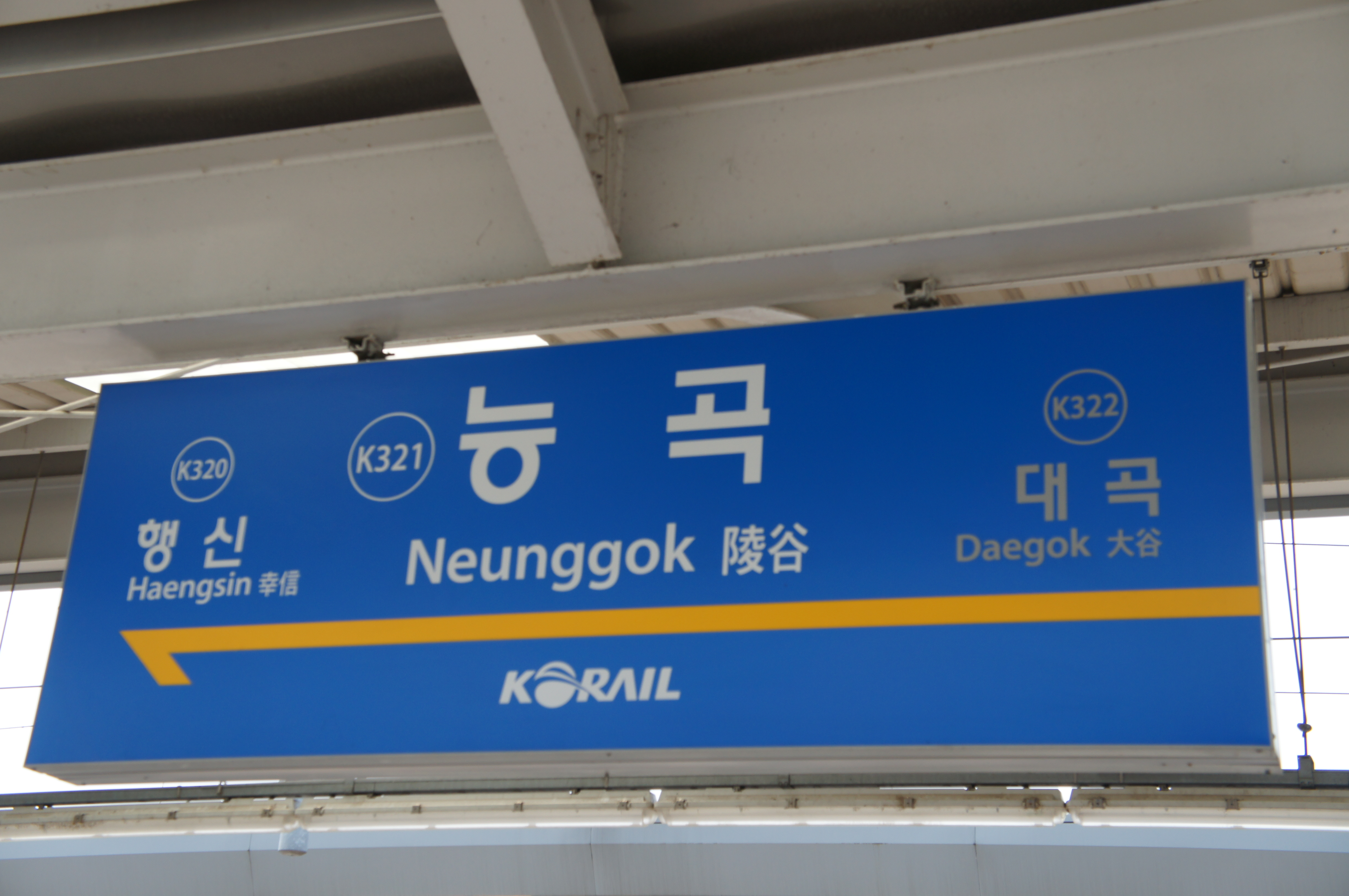

Korean name
- Hangul: 능곡역
- Hanja: 陵谷驛
- Revised Romanization: Neunggongnyeok
- McCune–Reischauer: Nŭnggongnyŏk

General information
- Location: 454 Todang-dong; Deogyang-gu, Goyang; Gyeonggi-do
- Coordinates: 37°37′08″N 126°49′16″E
- Operator: Korail
- Lines: Gyeongui–Jungang Line; Seohae Line
- Platforms: 4 (2 island platforms)
- Tracks: 4
- Bus routes: 7728; 9707 9708 9713; 33 150 870 873

Construction
- Structure type: Aboveground

History
- Opened: July 1, 1923

Key dates
- July 1, 2009: Gyeongui–Jungang Line started service
- July 1, 2023: Seohae Line opened

Services
Preceding station	Seoul Metropolitan Subway	Following station
Daegok towards Munsan	Gyeongui–Jungang Line	Haengsin towards Jipyeong or Seoul Station
Daegok towards Munsan	Gyeongui–Jungang Line Jungang Express	Haengsin towards Yongmun
Daegok towards Ilsan	Seohae Line	Gimpo International Airport towards Wonsi
Location

Neunggok Station is a station on the Gyeongui–Jungang Line and the Seohae Line in South Korea.

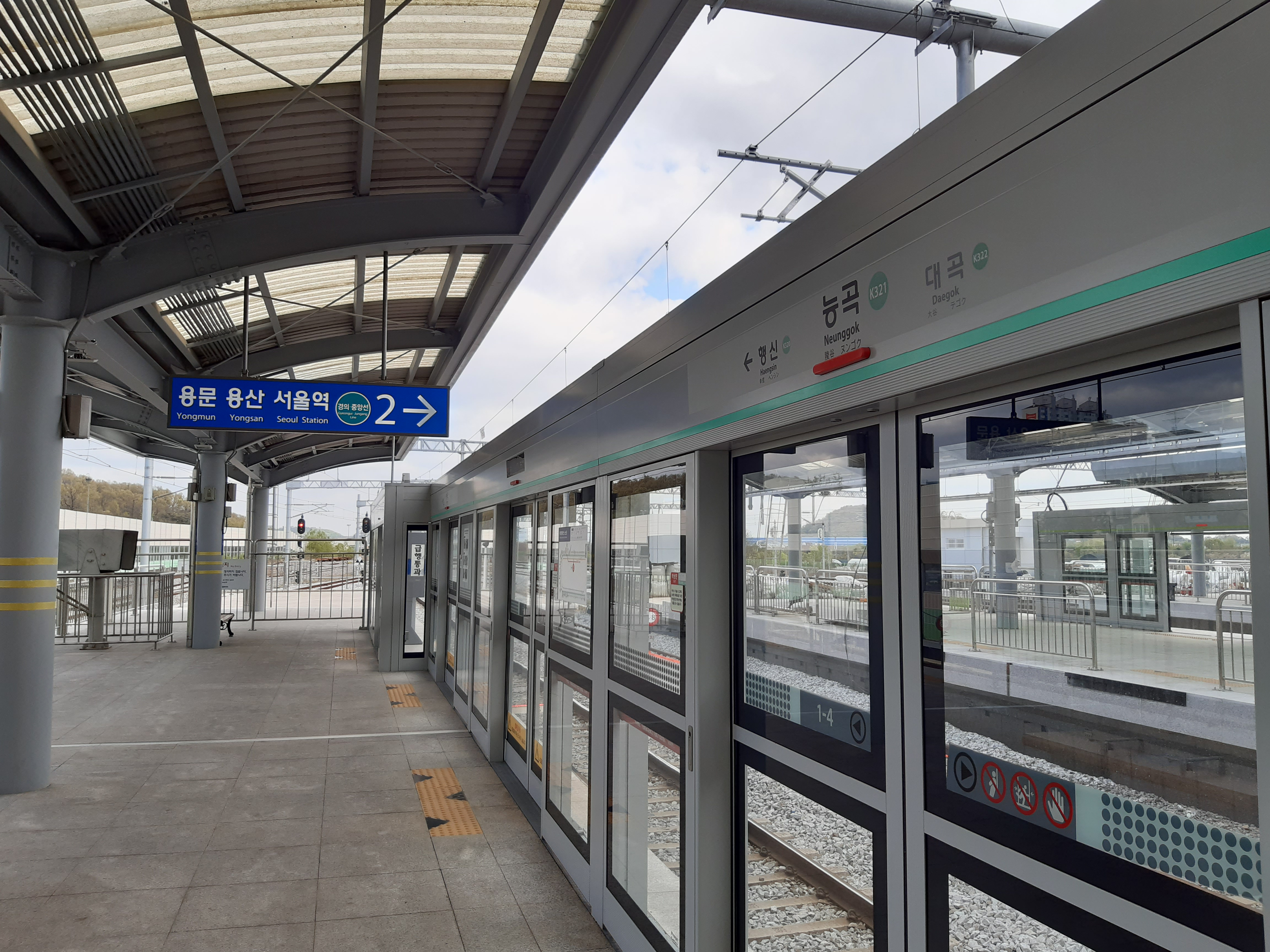
Gyeongui–Jungang Line platform

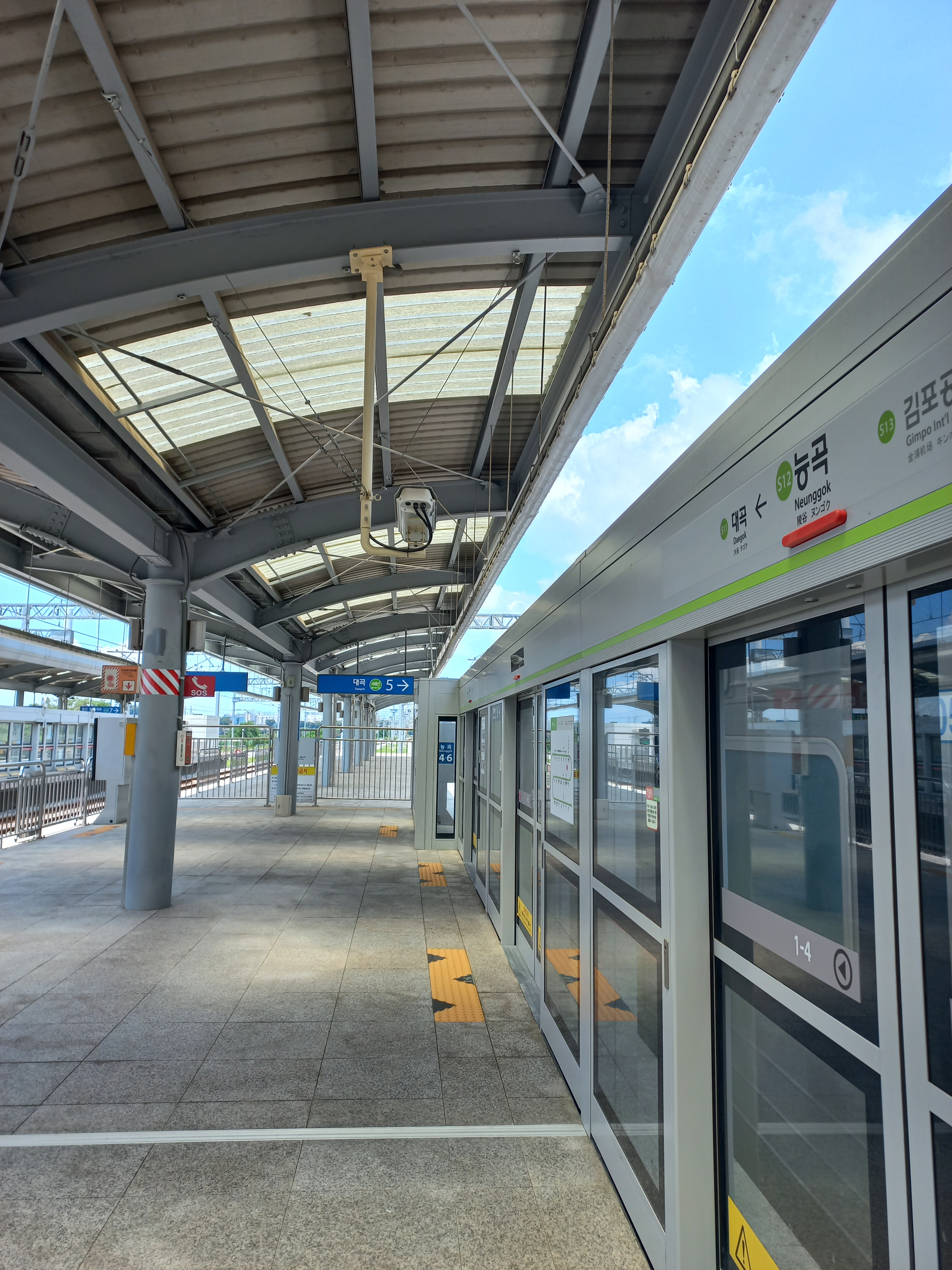
Seohae Line platform

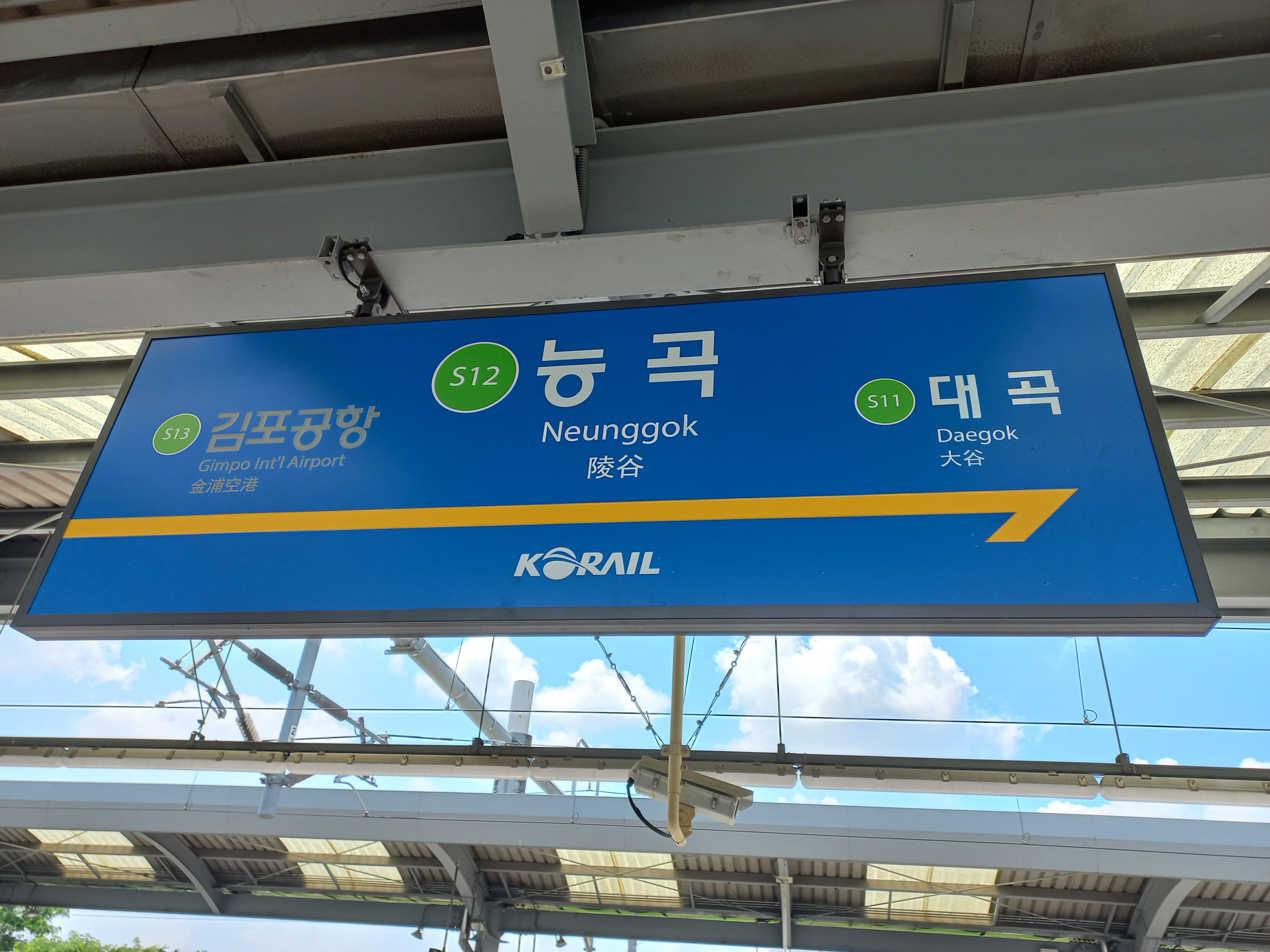
Seohae Line station name sign
