= Siheung Daeya station =

Train station in South Korea

시흥대야; Siheung Daeya
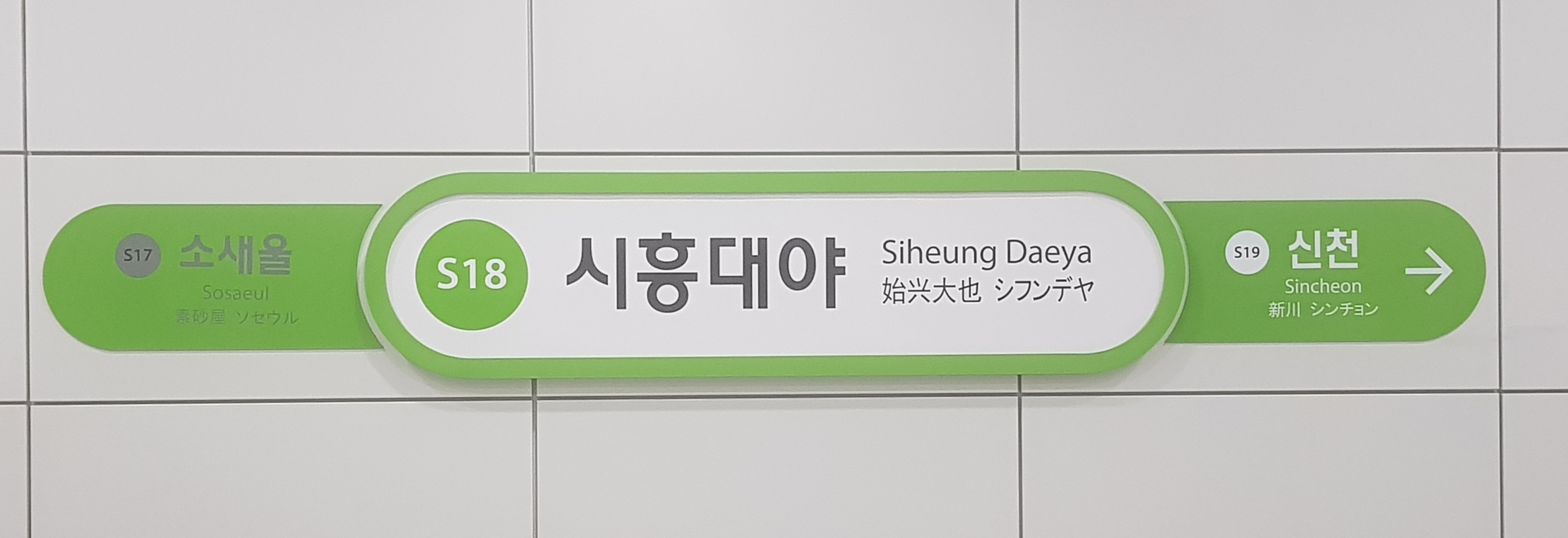
- Station nameplate

Korean name
- Hangul: 시흥대야역
- Hanja: 始興大也驛
- Revised Romanization: Siheungdaeya-yeok
- McCune–Reischauer: Sihŭngdaeya-yŏk

General information
- Location: Siheung, Gyeonggi-do
- Operator: Korail; SEO HAE RAIL CO., LTD.
- Line: Seohae Line
- Platforms: 2 (2 side platforms)
- Tracks: 2

Construction
- Structure type: Underground

History
- Opened: June 16, 2018
Location

Siheung Daeya station is a station on the Seohae Line in South Korea. It opened on June 16, 2018.

A third exit opened on January 1, 2020, with a fourth exit under construction.

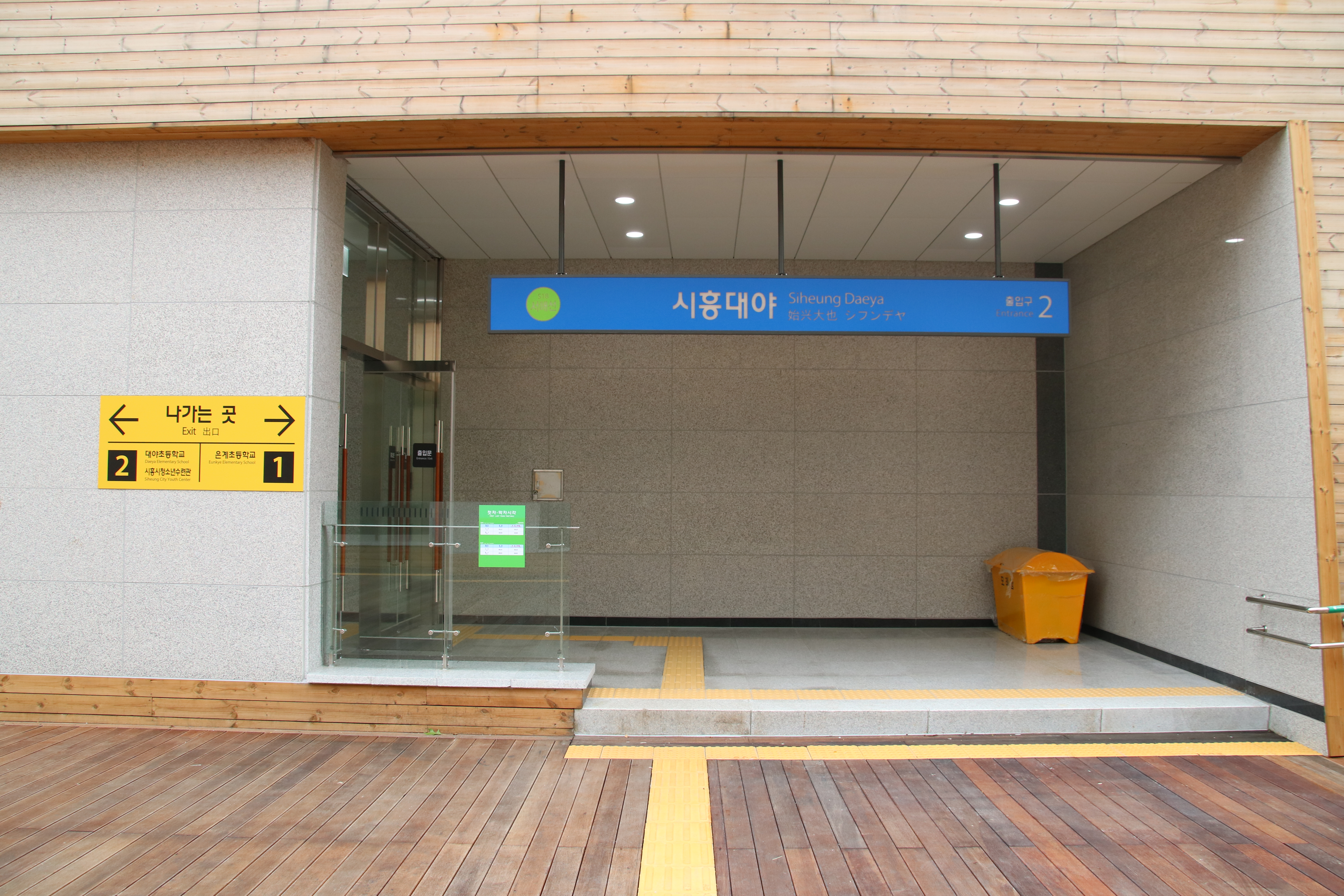
Entrance 2

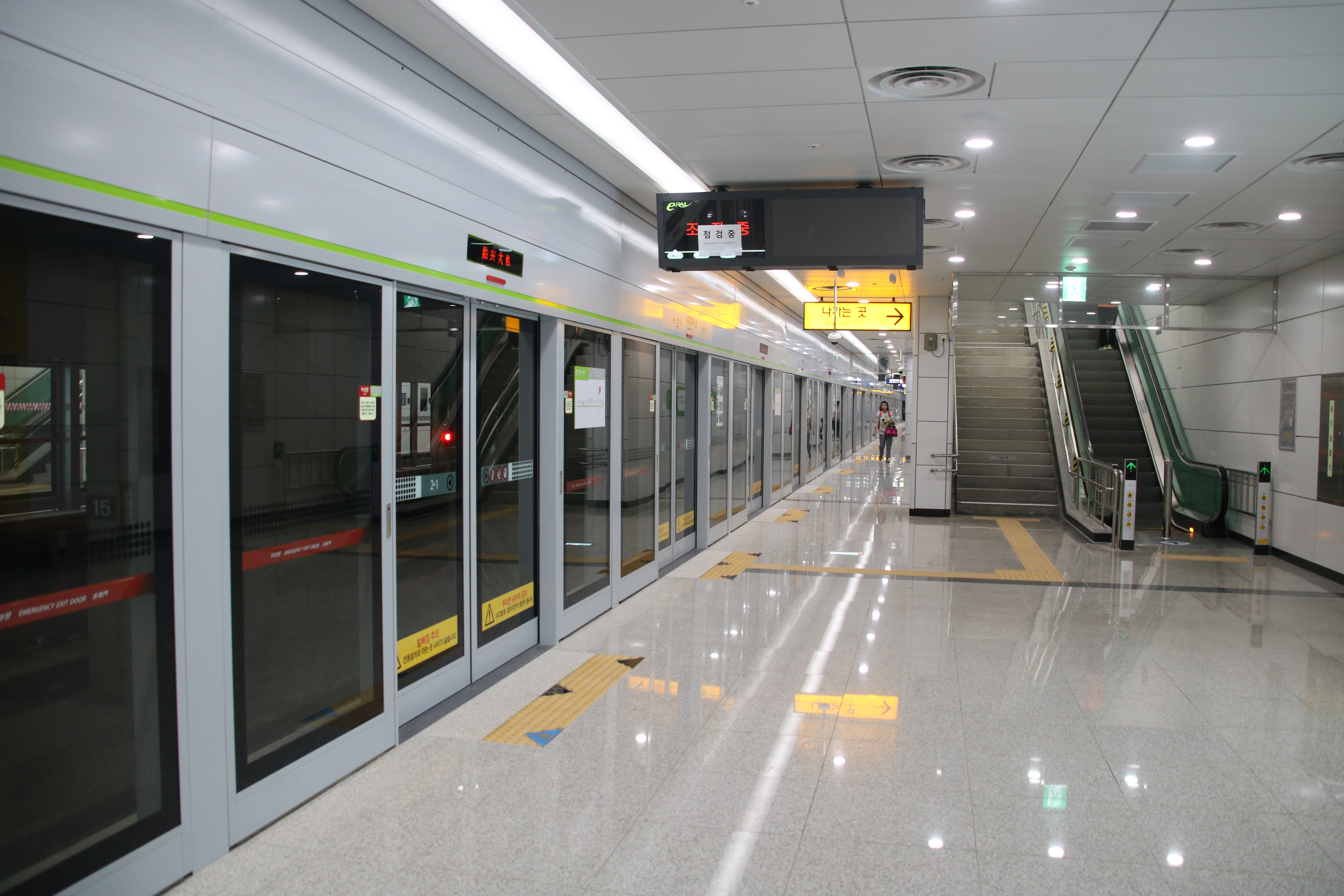
Station Platform

Preceding station	Seoul Metropolitan Subway	Following station
Sosaeul towards Ilsan	Seohae Line	Sincheon towards Wonsi
