= Sosa station =

Metro station in Bucheon, South Korea

소사 (서울신대); Sosa (Seoul Theological Univ.)
소사 (서울신대); Sosa (Seoul Theological Univ.)
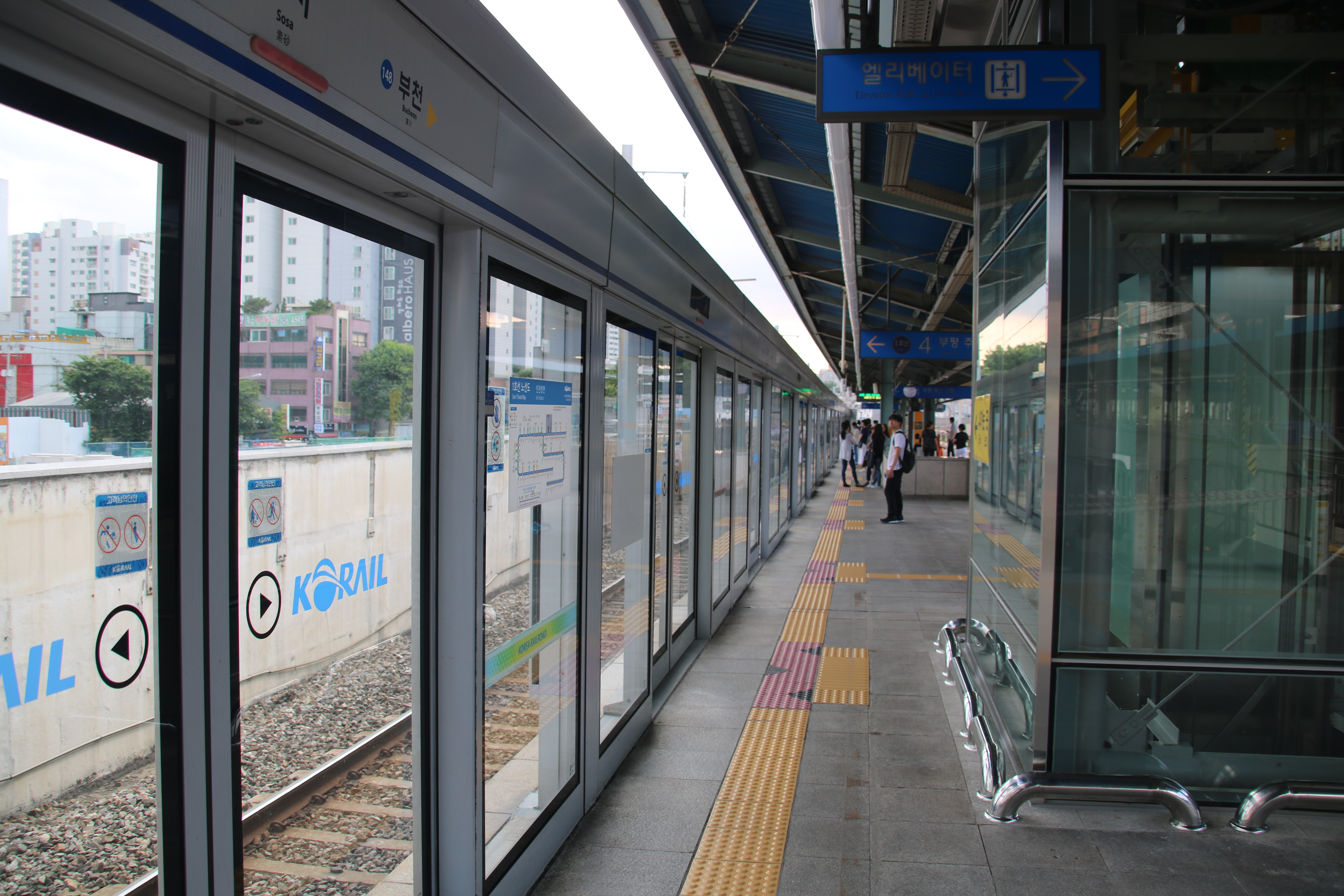

Korean name
- Hangul: 소사역
- Hanja: 素砂驛
- RR: Sosa-yeok
- MR: Sosa-yŏk

General information
- Location: 51 Sosabon 2-dong, 272 Sosaro, Sosa-gu, Bucheon-si, Gyeonggi-do
- Coordinates: 37°28′58″N 126°47′44″E
- Operator: Korail; SEO HAE RAIL CO., LTD.
- Line: Gyeongin Line
- Platforms: 4
- Tracks: 6

Construction
- Structure type: Aboveground/Underground

History
- Opened: April 30, 1997; June 16, 2018

Passengers
- (Daily) Based on Jan–Dec of 2012. Line 1: 32,222

Services
Preceding station	Seoul Metropolitan Subway	Following station
Yeokgok towards Soyosan	Line 1	Bucheon towards Incheon
Yeokgok towards Dongducheon	Line 1 Gyeongwon Express	Bucheon towards Incheon
Bucheon Stadium towards Ilsan	Seohae Line	Sosaeul towards Wonsi
Location

Sosa Station (Korean: 소사역; Hanja: 素砂驛; RR: Sosa-yeok) is a station on Seoul Subway Line 1 and Seohae Line in Bucheon City, west of Seoul.

== History ==
The station was opened in 1997.

In the future, Sosa is planned to serve several new metro lines; Seohae Line, starting at Wonsi Port (in Ansan City) in the south, through Siheung City, as well as Sosa–Daegok Line going north through Bucheon, Gimpo, and Goyang. These lines would allow connections from Sosa to Line 4 in Ansan, the Sin-Ansan line, Line 1 (at Sosa), Line 7 (in Bucheon), Lines 5 and 9 and AREX (at Gimpo Airport), and Line 3 and the Gyeongui Line (at Daegok Station near Ilsan).

== Gallery ==
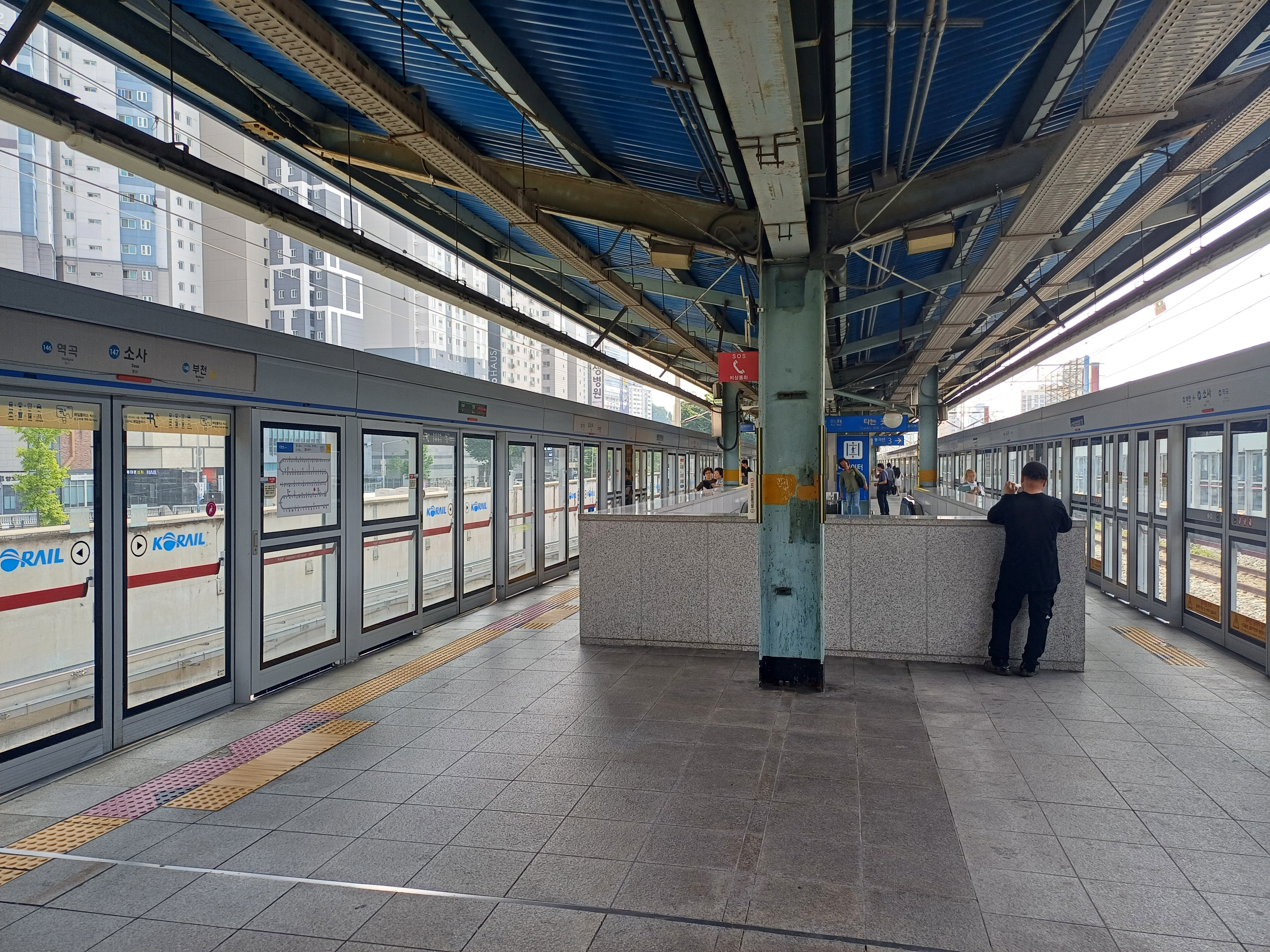
Line 1 platforms

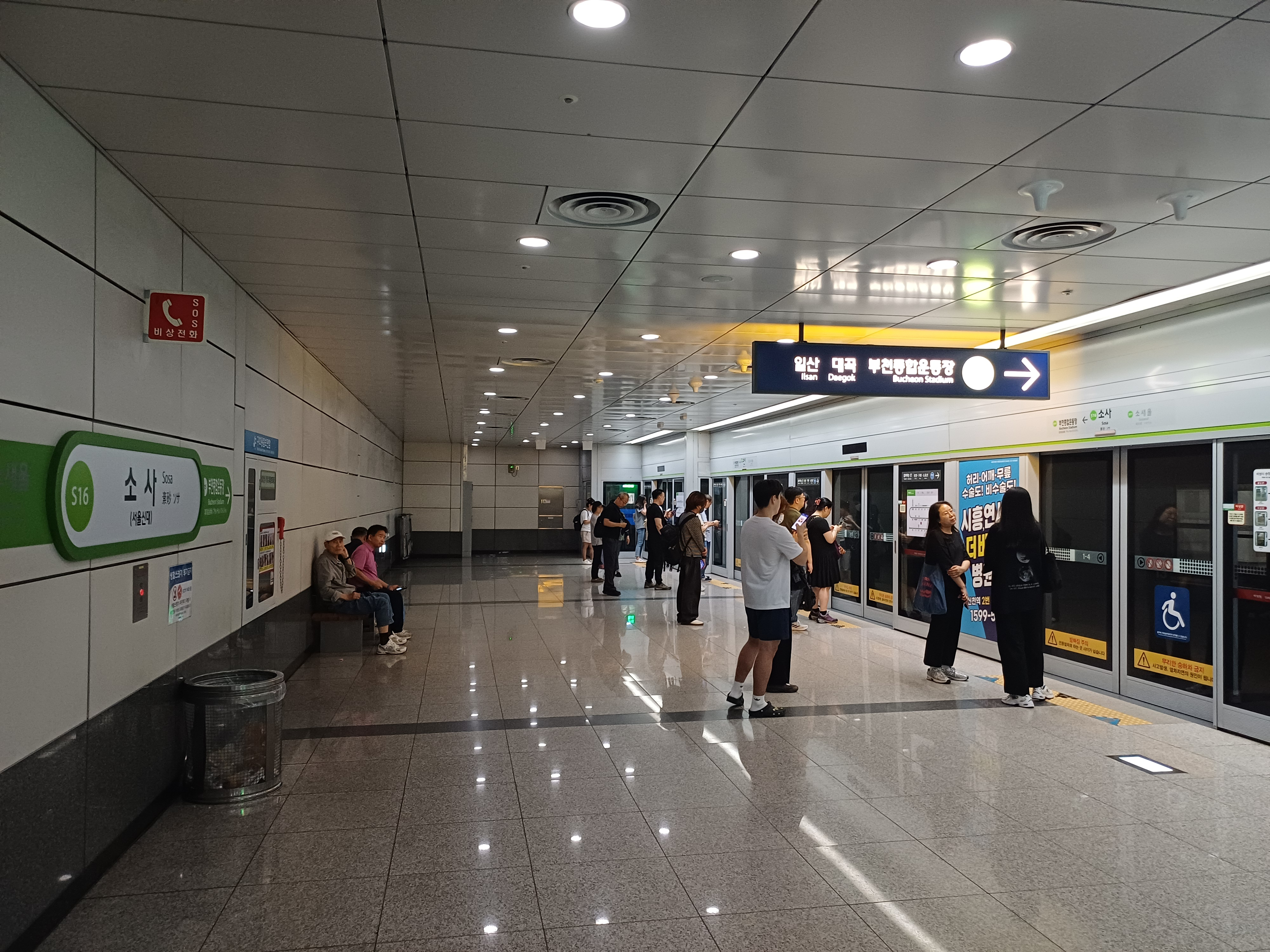
Seohae Line platform

== Surroundings ==
Seoul Theological University is nearby. Bucheon Bow Museum is located. It provides opportunities for children to experience precious traditional culture by touching and creating bow and arrowheads that were only seen in books.
