= Sosaeul station =

Station of the Seoul Metropolitan Subway

소새울 (부천대소사캠퍼스); Sosaeul (Bucheon Univ. Sosa Campus)
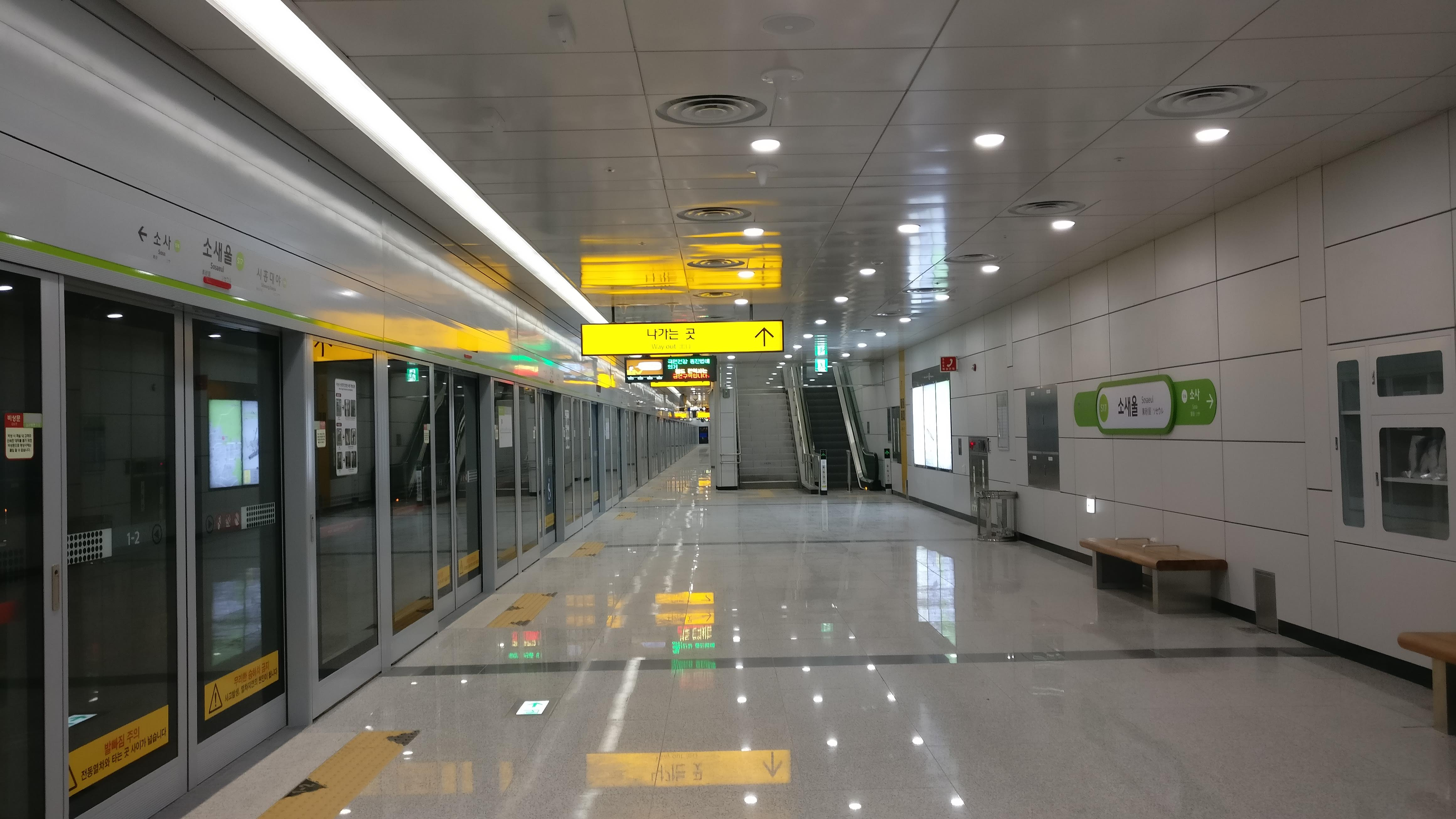
- Station platform

Korean name
- Hangul: 소새울역
- Hanja: 소새울驛
- Revised Romanization: Sosaeul-yeok
- McCune–Reischauer: Sosaeul-yŏk

General information
- Location: Bucheon, Gyeonggi-do
- Coordinates: 37°28′5.6″N 126°47′50.6″E
- Operator: Korail; SEO HAE RAIL CO., LTD.
- Line: Seohae Line
- Platforms: 2 (2 side platforms)
- Tracks: 2

Construction
- Structure type: Underground

History
- Opened: June 16, 2018
Location

Sosaeul station is a station on the Seohae Line in South Korea. It opened on June 16, 2018.

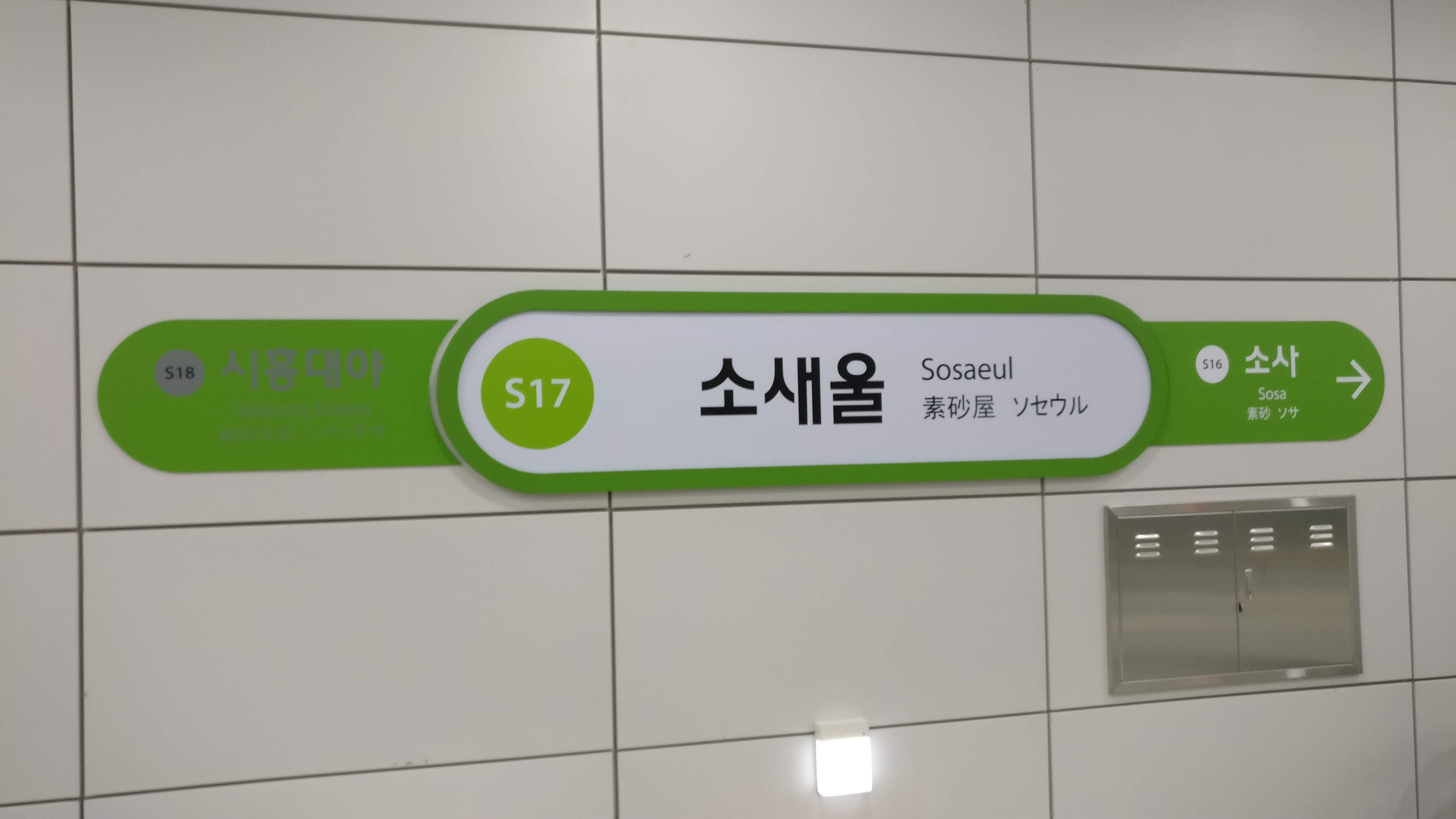
Station nameplate

Preceding station	Seoul Metropolitan Subway	Following station
Sosa towards Ilsan	Seohae Line	Siheung Daeya towards Wonsi
