= Siheung City Hall station =

Metro station in Siheung, South Korea

시흥시청; Siheung City Hall
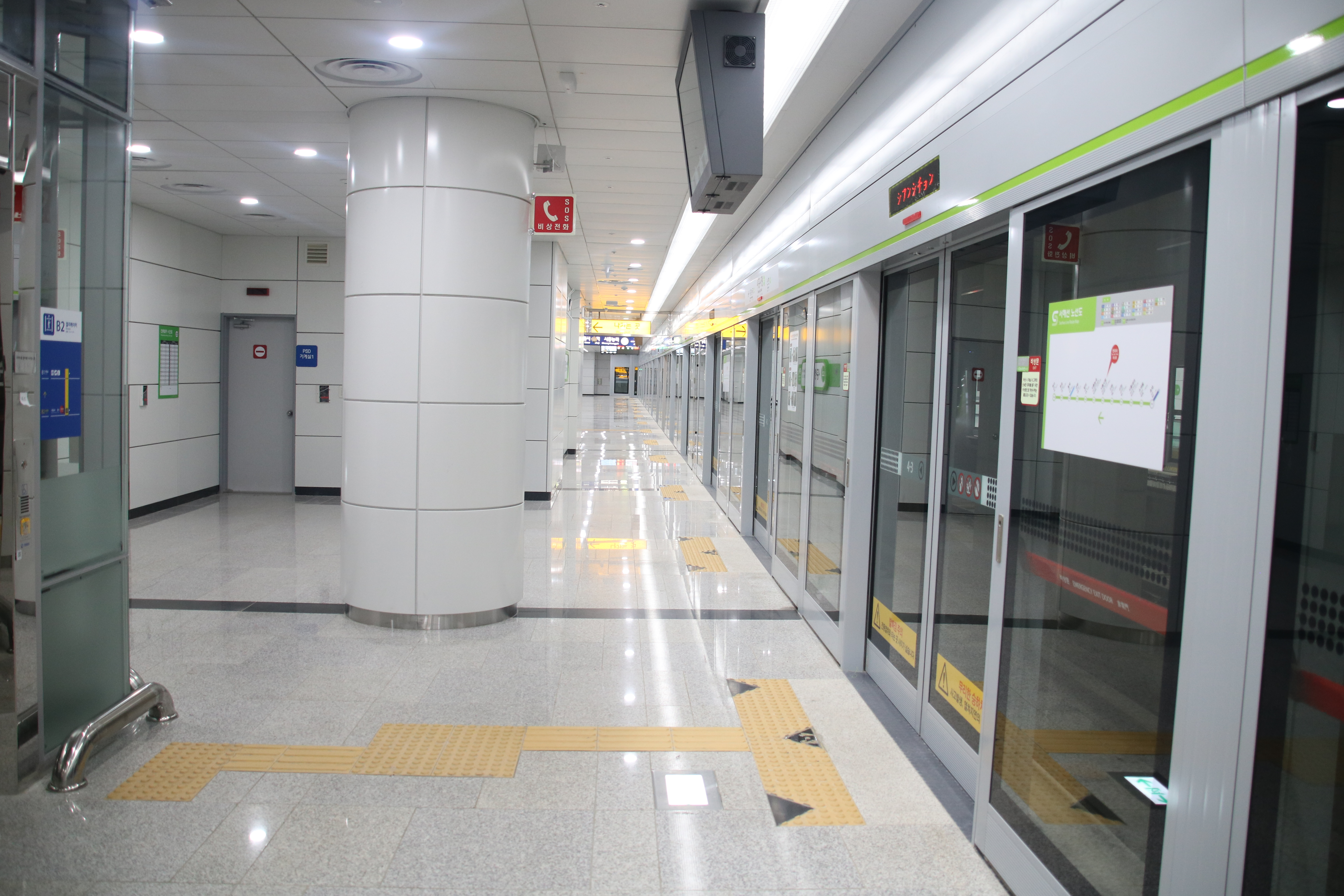
- Station platform

Korean name
- Hangul: 시흥시청역
- Hanja: 始興市廳驛
- Revised Romanization: Siheungsicheong-yeok
- McCune–Reischauer: Sihŭngsich'ŏng-yŏk

General information
- Location: Siheung, Gyeonggi-do
- Coordinates: 37°22′49.8″N 126°48′23.4″E
- Operator: Korail; SEO HAE RAIL CO., LTD.
- Line: Seohae Line
- Platforms: 2 (2 side platforms)
- Tracks: 2

Construction
- Structure type: Underground

History
- Opened: June 16, 2018
Location

Siheung City Hall station is a station on the Seohae Line in South Korea. It opened on June 16, 2018.

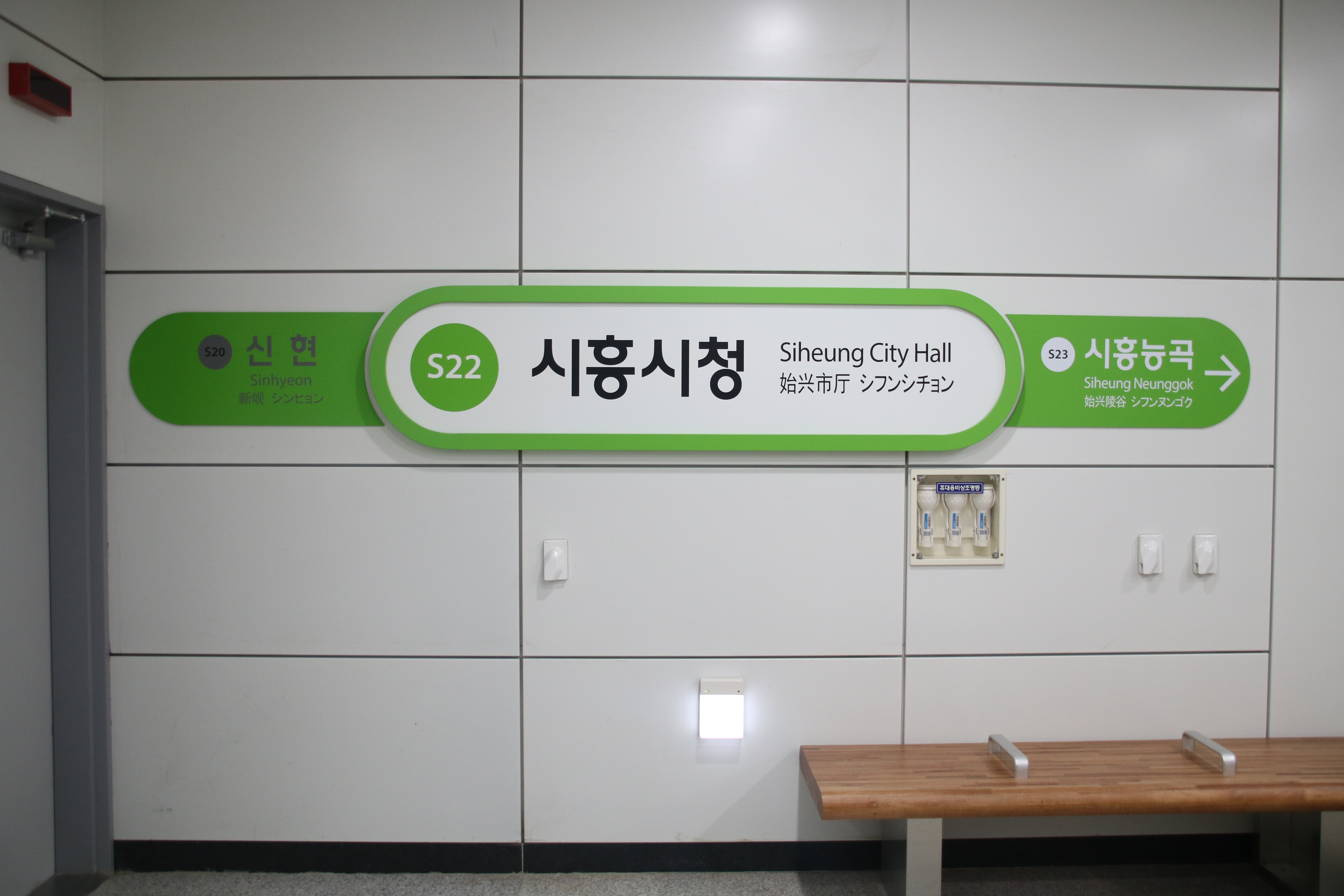
Station nameplate

- April 6, 2018: Announcement of railway distance table
- June 16, 2018: Seohae Line opened with the opening of business

Preceding station	Seoul Metropolitan Subway	Following station
Sinhyeon towards Ilsan	Seohae Line	Siheung Neunggok towards Wonsi
