= Daegok station (Goyang) =

Metro station in Goyang, South Korea

대곡
Daegok
대곡; Daegok
대곡; Daegok
대곡; Daegok
대곡; Daegok
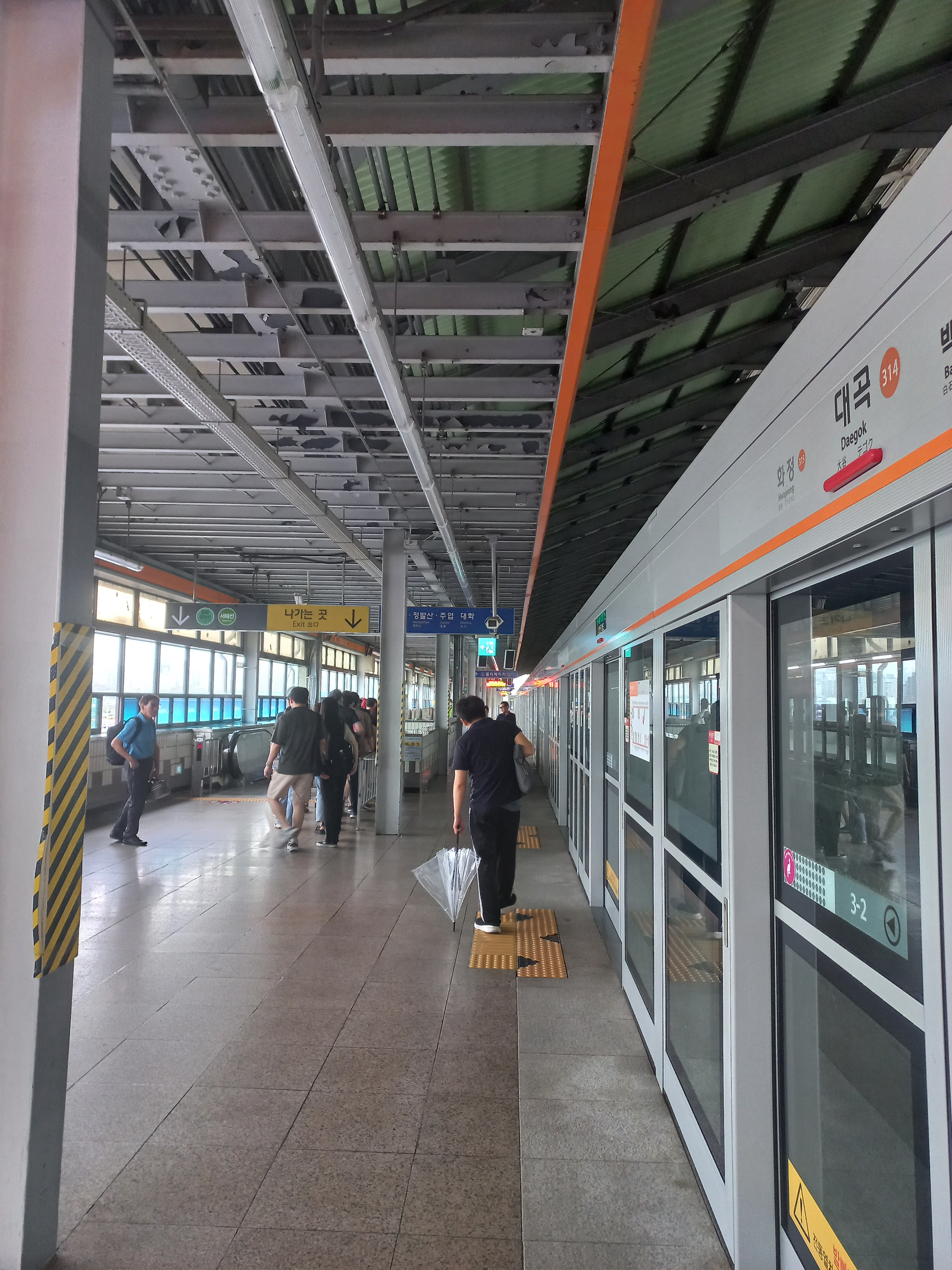
- Line 3 platform

Korean name
- Hangul: 대곡역
- Hanja: 大谷驛
- Revised Romanization: Daegongnyeok
- McCune–Reischauer: Taegongnyŏk

General information
- Location: 426-2 Daejang-dong, 71-81 Daeju-ro 107-beongil, Deogyang-gu, Goyang-si, Gyeonggi-do
- Coordinates: 37°37′51.15″N 126°48′37.92″E
- Operator: Korail; GTX-A Operation
- Lines: Line 3 GTX-A; Gyeongui–Jungang Line; Seohae Line
- Platforms: 6
- Tracks: 8

Construction
- Structure type: Aboveground

Key dates
- January 30, 1996: Line 3 opened
- July 1, 2009: Gyeongui–Jungang Line opened
- July 1, 2023: Seohae Line opened
- December 28, 2024: GTX-A opened

Passengers
- (Daily) Based on Jan-Dec of 2012. Line 3: 1,803
Location

Daegok station (Korean: 대곡역) is a station on Seoul Subway Line 3, Seoul Subway GTX-A Line, the Gyeongui–Jungang Line and the Seohae Line. It is located in Goyang, Gyeonggi Province, South Korea. It is mainly used as a transfer station between the four lines rather than as an actual enter-and-exit stop, as the station is located in the midst of farmland with very little local resident demand.

It hosted a third line for transfer, as the Seohae Line was built and brought northward on July 1, 2023. This now allows for much faster, direct subway travel between Ilsan, Gimpo Airport, Bucheon, Siheung, and Ansan.

Effective December 28, 2024, the platforms for the GTX-A higher speed commuter rail line began operation.

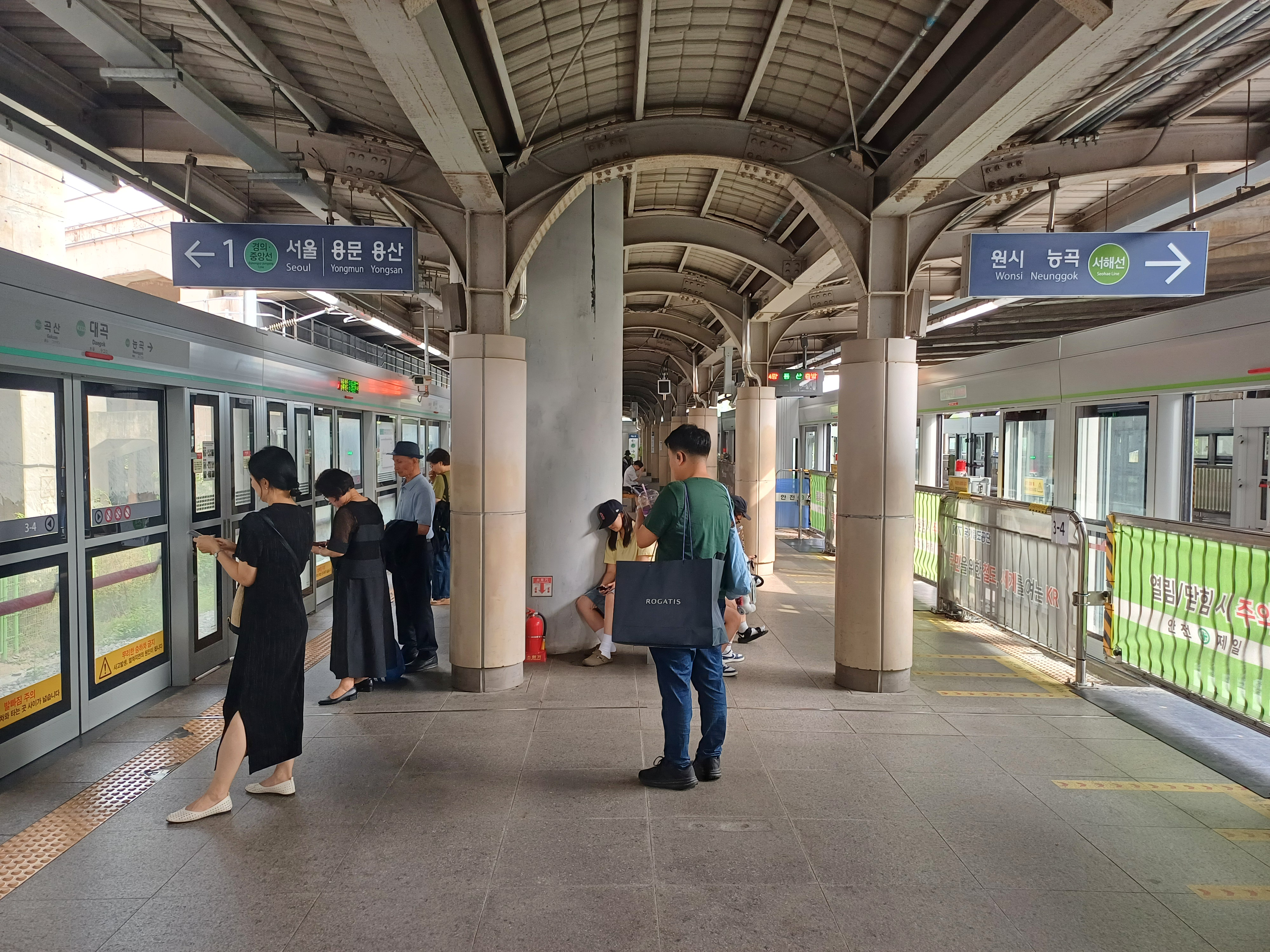
Gyeongui-Jungang Line & Seohae Line platforms

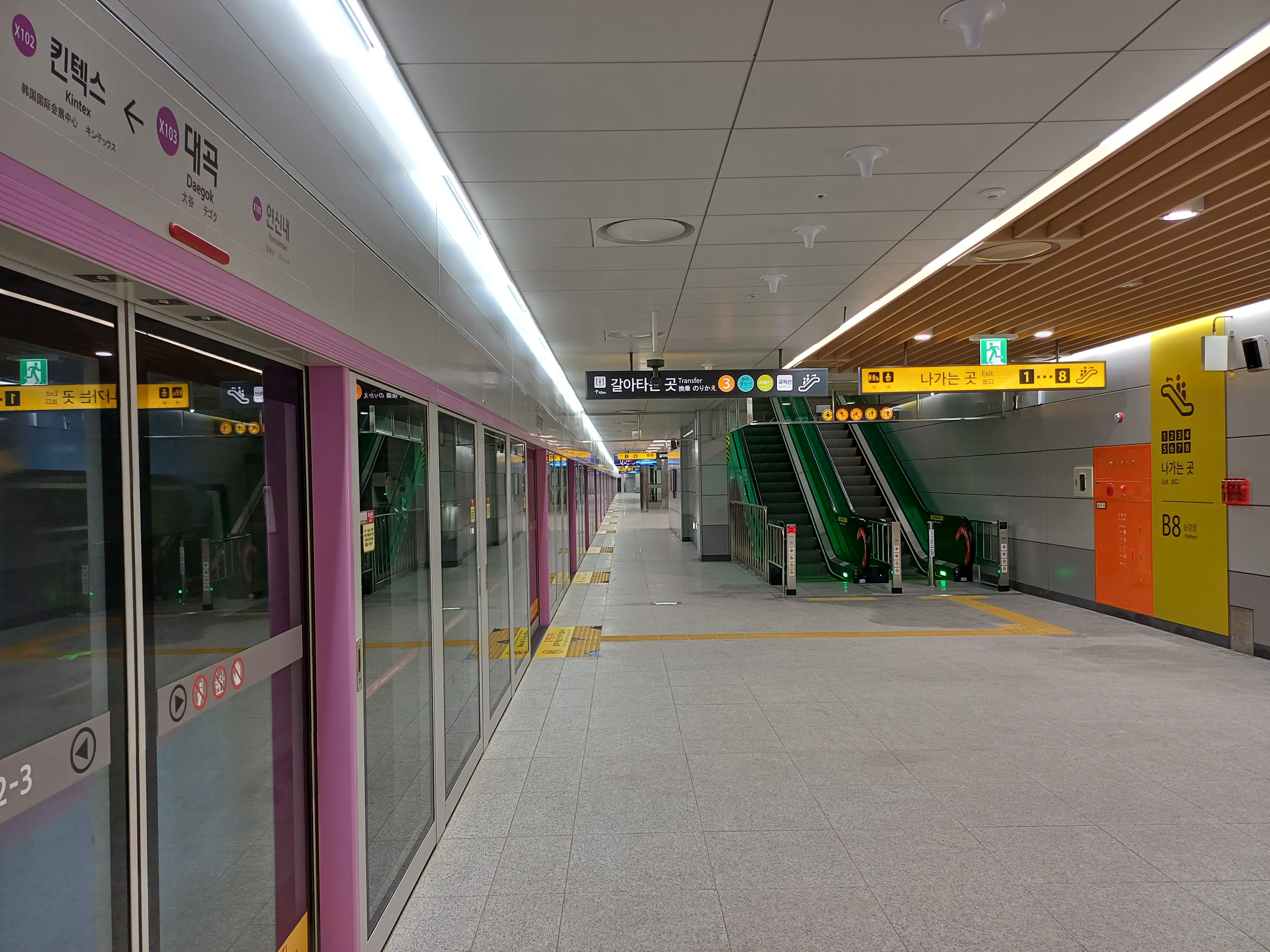
GTX-A platform

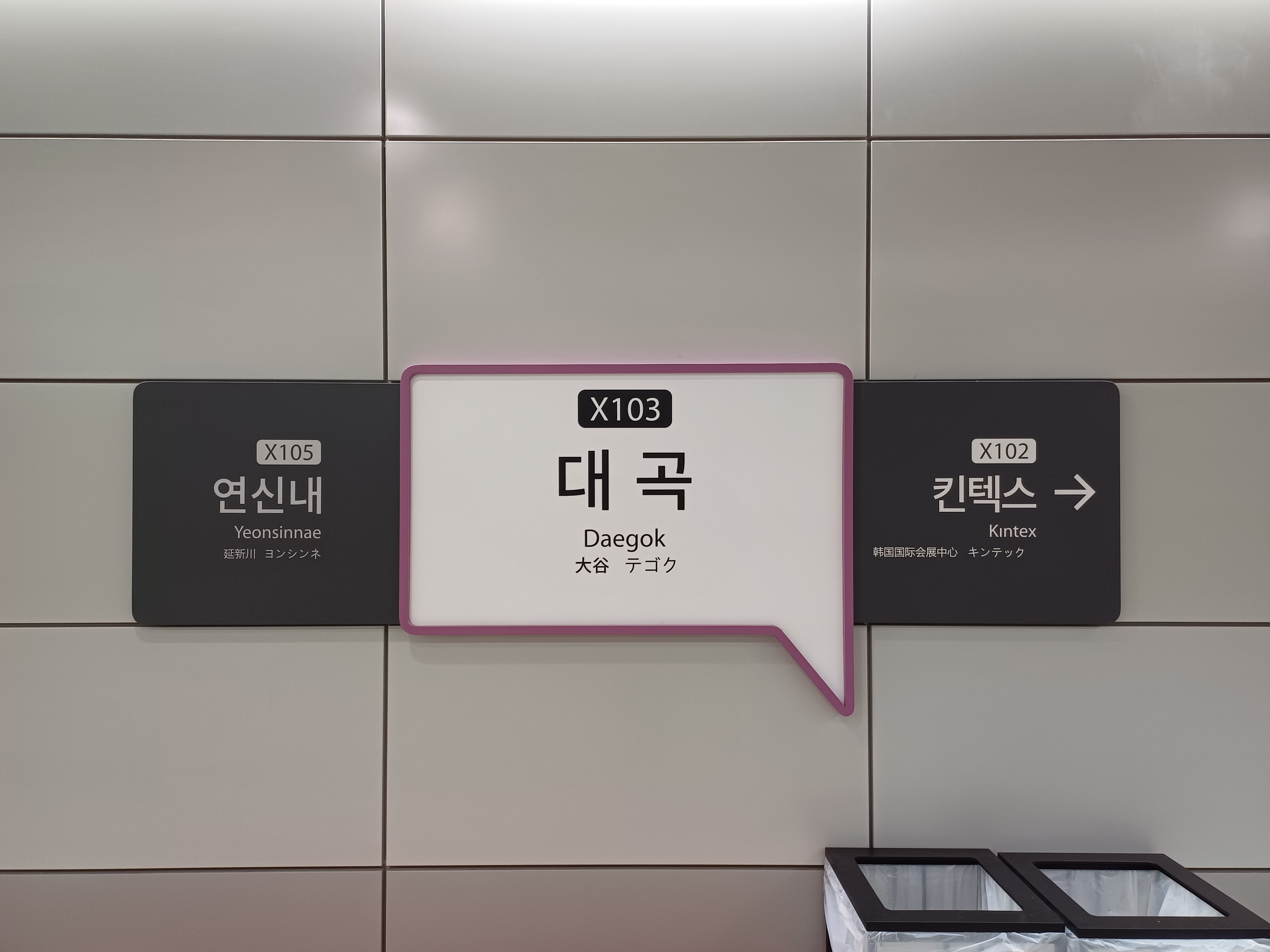
GTX-A station nameplate

== Vicinity ==
- Exit 1: Neunggok Elementary School
- Exit 5: Daegok Elementary School

Preceding station	Seoul Metropolitan Subway	Following station
Baekseok towards Daehwa	Line 3	Hwajeong towards Ogeum
Goksan towards Munsan	Gyeongui–Jungang Line	Neunggok towards Jipyeong or Seoul Station
Baengma towards Munsan	Gyeongui–Jungang Line Gyeongui Express	Haengsin towards Yongmun
Baengma towards Munsan	Gyeongui–Jungang Line Gyeongui Express	Haengsin towards Seoul Station
Goksan towards Munsan	Gyeongui–Jungang Line Jungang Express	Neunggok towards Yongmun
Goksan towards Ilsan	Seohae Line	Neunggok towards Wonsi
Kintex towards Unjeongjungang	GTX-A	Yeonsinnae towards Seoul Station
Preceding station	Korail	Following station
Terminus	Mugunghwa-ho Gyooe Line	Wolleung towards Uijeongbu
