= Gyooe Line =

Railway line in Gyeonggi-do, South Korea

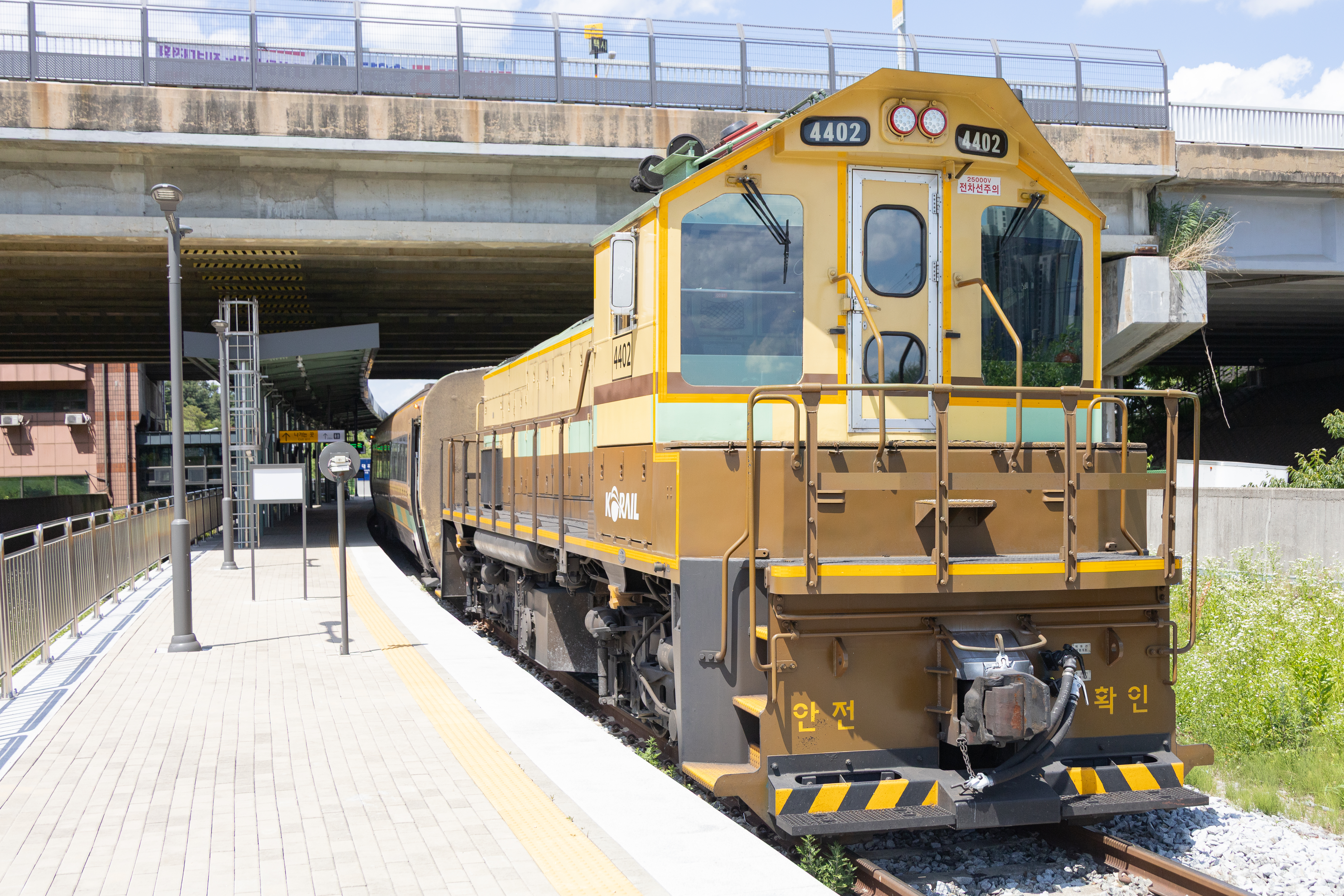

Overview
- Native name: 교외선(郊外線)
- Status: Operational
- Owner: Korea Rail Network Authority
- Locale: Gyeonggi
- Termini: Daegok; Uijeongbu

Service
- Type: Passenger rail
- Operator: Korail

History
- Opened: Stages between 1961–1963

Technical
- Line length: 31.8 km (19.8 mi)
- Num of tracks: Single track
- Track gauge: 1,435 mm (4 ft 8 1/2 in) standard gauge

- Gyooe Line
- Hangul: 교외선
- Hanja: 郊外線
- RR: Gyooeseon
- MR: Kyooesŏn

The Gyooe Line (Korean: 교외선; suburb line) is a railway line in Gyeonggi Province, South Korea, that connects Daegok station in Goyang City (northwest of Seoul) with Uijeongbu station in Uijeongbu, north of Seoul.

== History ==
Plans for the Gyooe Line were initially drafted during the Japanese Occupation of Korea as an alternate connection between the Gyeongui Line and the Jungang Line that avoids passing through Seoul. Construction on the line began in February 1944, but the opening of the line was cancelled despite the near-completion of the construction.

Work on the line resumed by October 1959. Following the May 16 coup in 1961, the Supreme Council for National Reconstruction started South Korea's first five-year plan, which included a construction program to complete the railway network, to foster economic growth. The 31.8 km (19.8 mi) line from Neunggok on the Gyeongui Line to Uijeongbu on the Gyeongwon Line was incorporated into the program and was completed on August 20, 1963.

== Operation ==
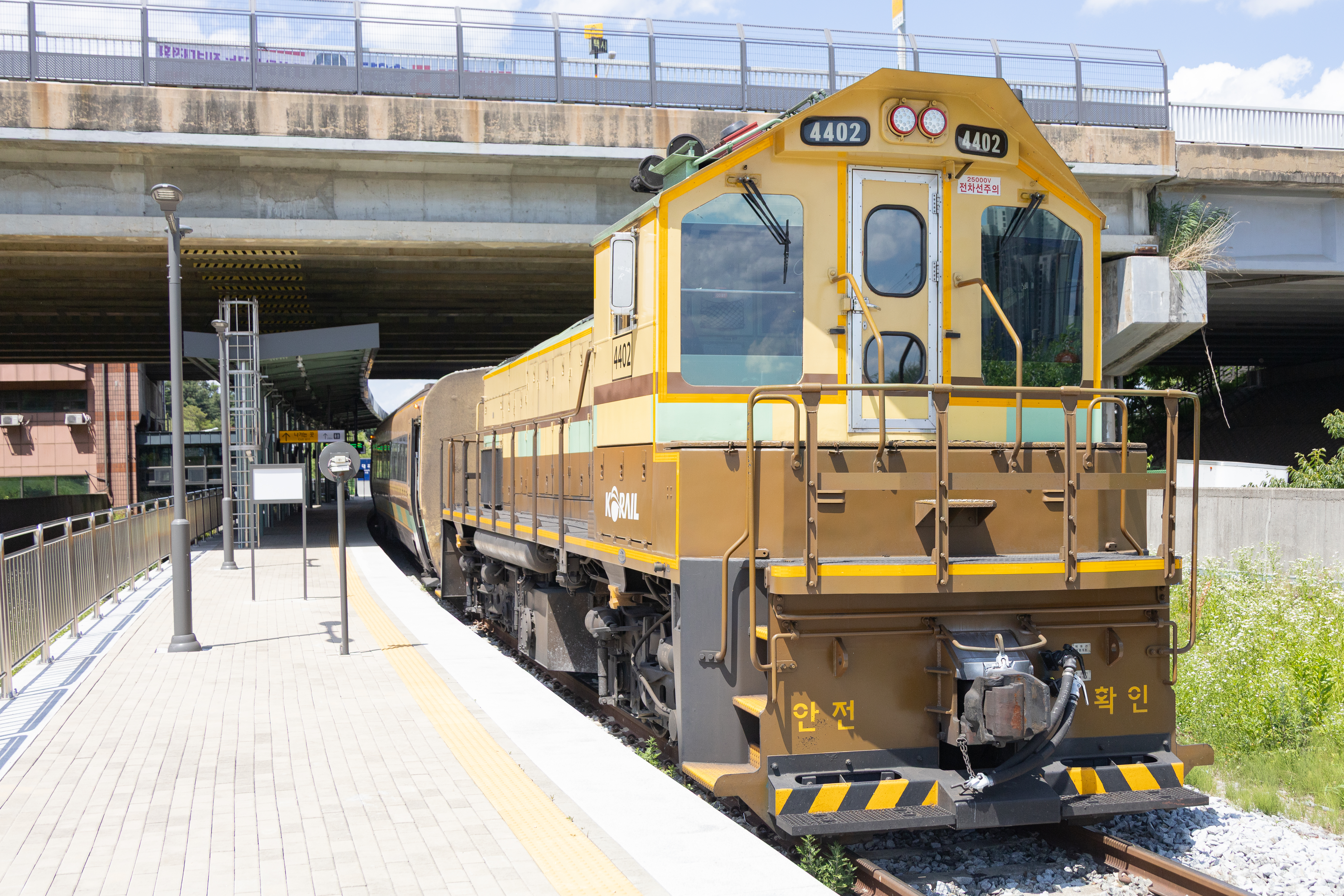
Gyooe Line train at Daegok Station

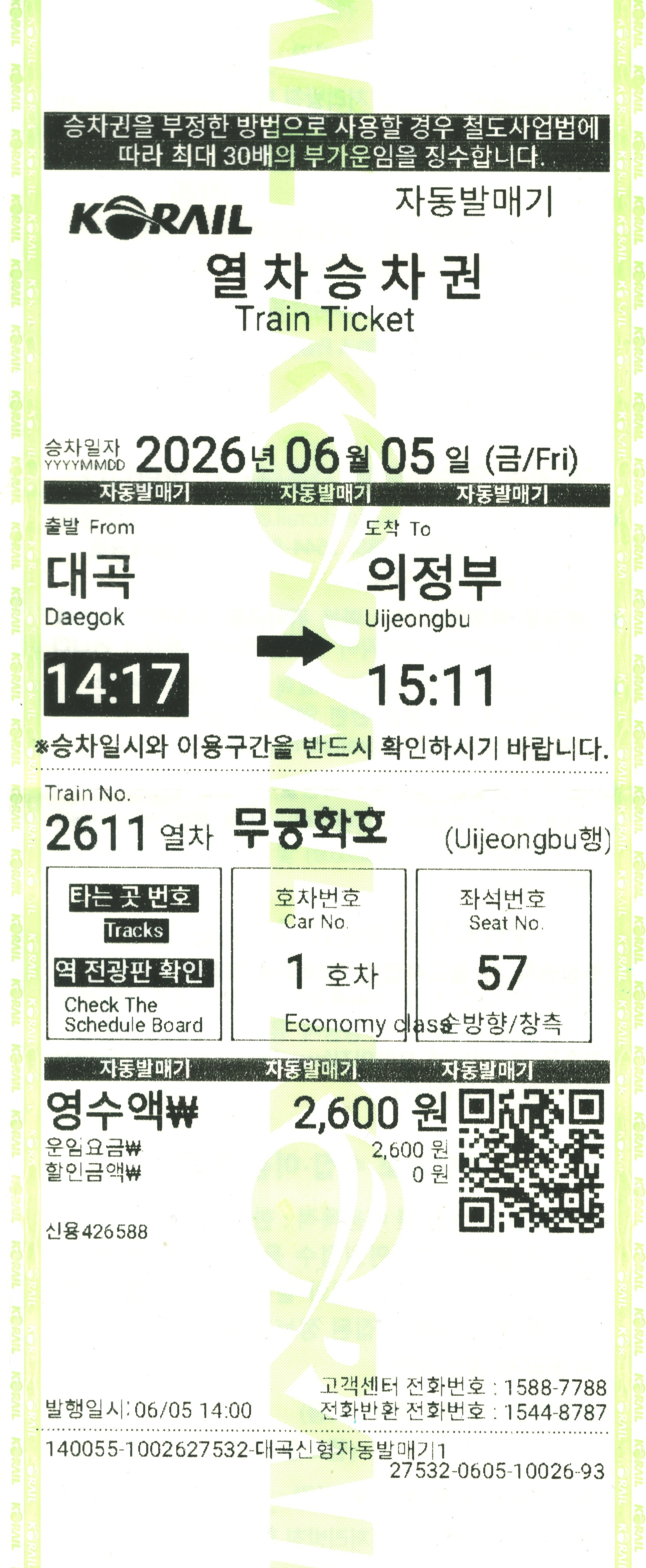
Train ticket for the Gyooe train line in South Korea.

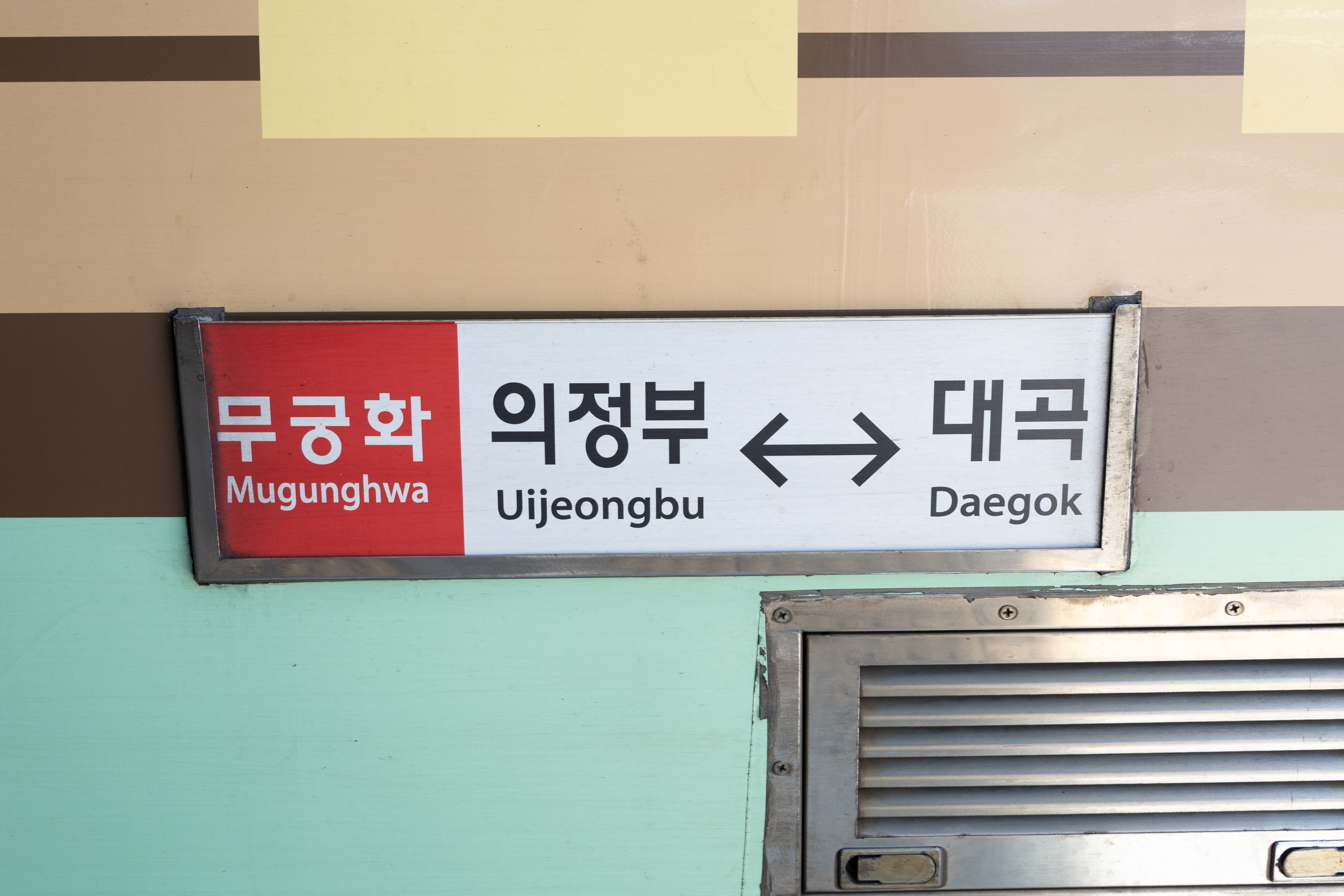
Gyooe Line train sign

Currently, the line is single-track, unelectrified, sees very little use and has no scheduled passenger service. Irregular freight train service was stopped in October 2013; Iryeong station was downgraded to unattended station on January 24, 2014. After that, the line became inoperational until a test run of freight trains resumed at the end of 2015 until end of January 2016. Following to the re-railing works at the northern part of Seoul Station, a need to re-route the freight trains through Gyooe lines occurred, and as the Yongsan Line became underground thus unusable for peacetime freight train service (incline of 34.5 permils) and Hyochang Line was abolished, the trains have to be rerouted through the Gyooe Line and thus test operation resumed on April 20, 2016, with its railroad crossings operational and staffed again. Regular freight train operation resumed on May 16, 2016.

== Future ==
- Goyang-Si, Yangju-si, Uijeongbu hope re-opening of Gyooe Line as circular railway line of Gyeonggi Province.
- As an extension of the future Daegok–Sosa–Wonsi Line, the Gyooe Line may be upgraded to a double-track, electrified railway, and see regular passenger service integrated into the Seoul Metropolitan Subway.
- The three cities and Korail decided to repair the Gyooe line, from Daegok station to Uijeongbu station until 2023. The railway condition will be unelectrified Single-track railway. The repaired Korail Commuter Diesel Car will be used.

== See also ==
- Transportation in South Korea
