= Sincheon station (Siheung) =

Train station in South Korea

신천; Sincheon
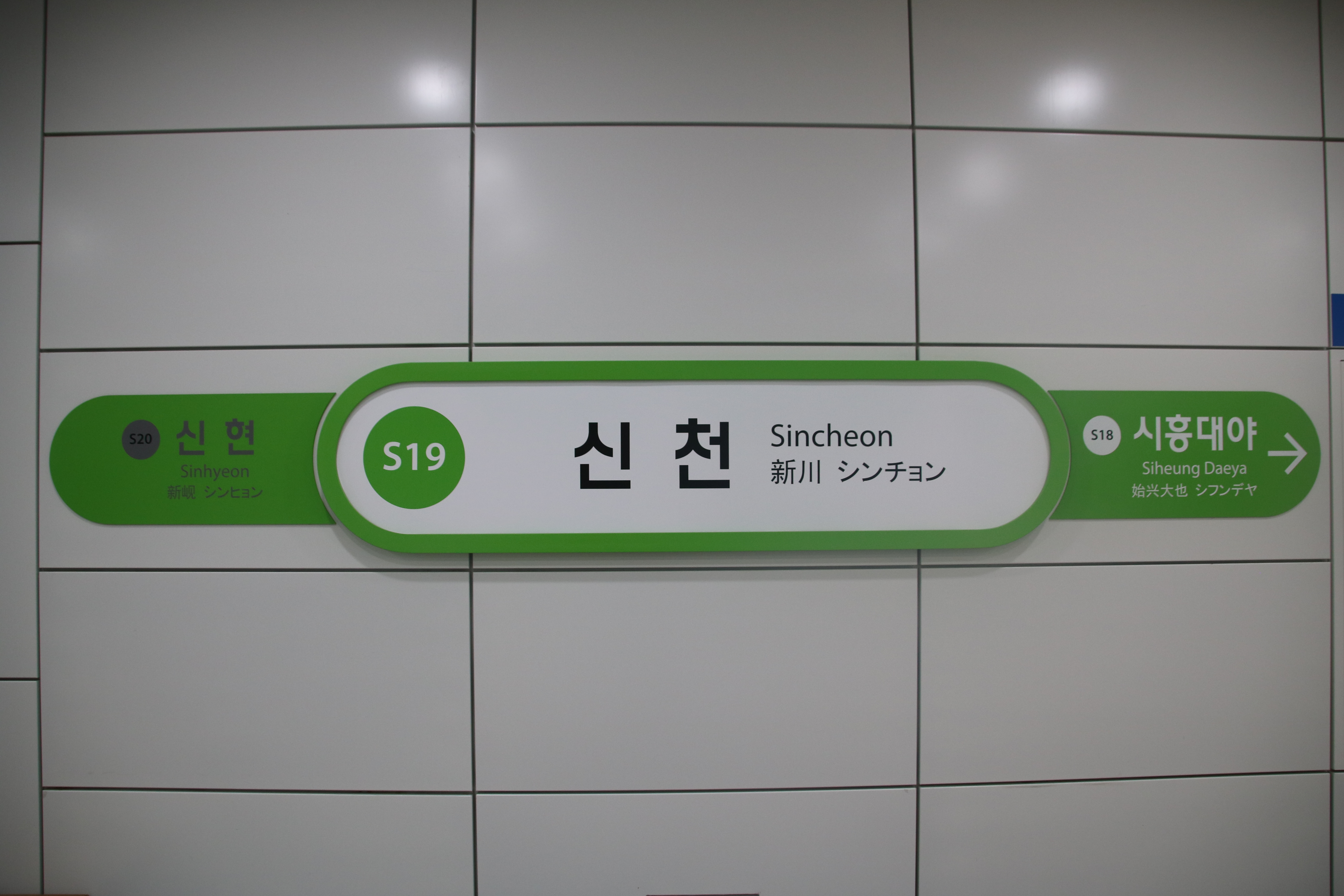
- Station nameplate

Korean name
- Hangul: 신천역
- Hanja: 新川驛
- Revised Romanization: Sincheon-yeok
- McCune–Reischauer: Sinch'ŏn-yŏk

General information
- Location: Siheung, Gyeonggi-do
- Operator: Korail; SEO HAE RAIL CO., LTD.
- Line: Seohae Line
- Platforms: 2 (2 side platforms)
- Tracks: 2

Construction
- Structure type: Underground

History
- Opened: June 16, 2018
Location

Sincheon station is a station on the Seohae Line in South Korea. It opened on June 16, 2018.

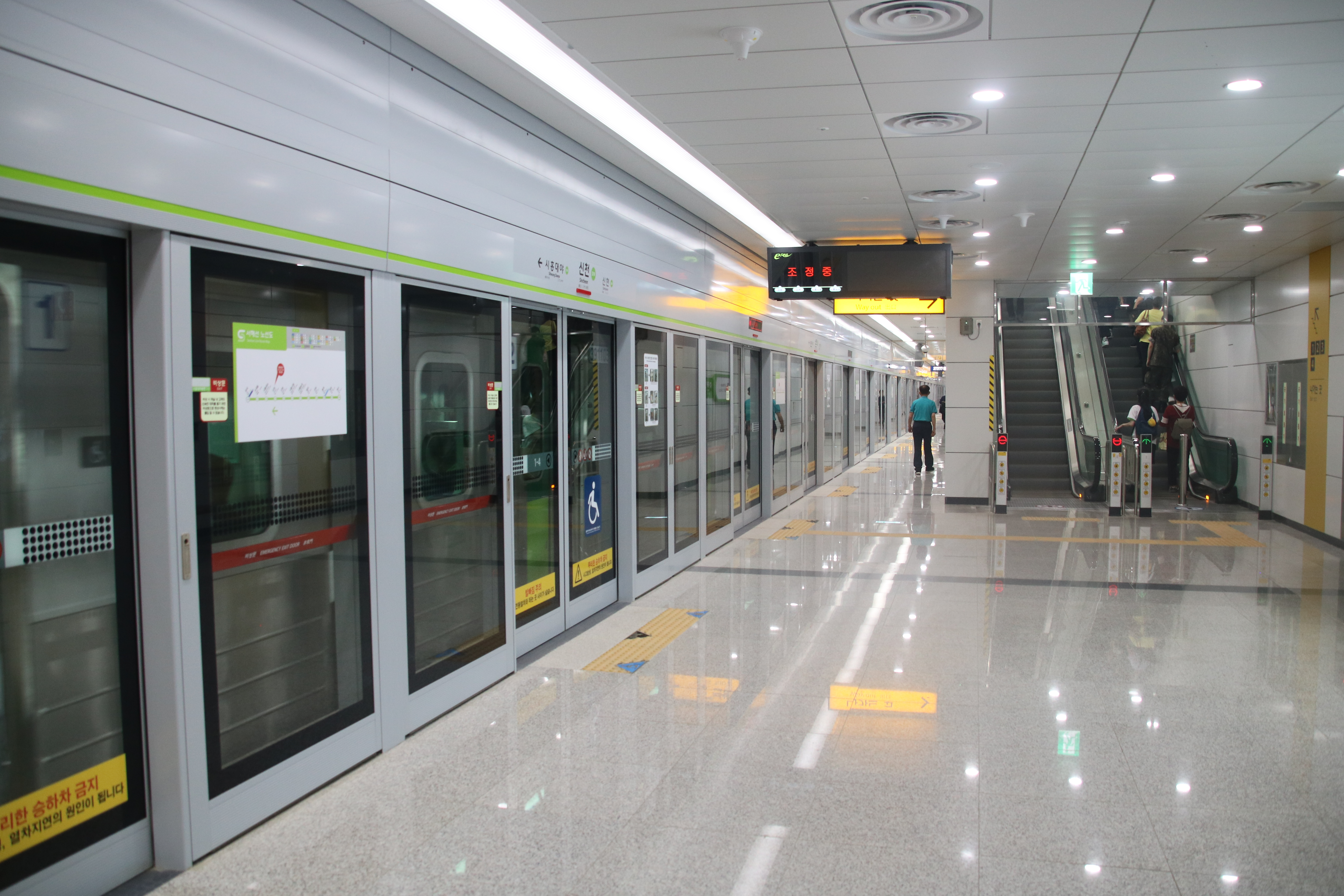
Station platform

== History ==
- October 21, 2013: The railway business line was officially announced, and the station was named Sincheon Station.
- April 6, 2018: The railway distance table was published.
- June 16, 2018: Passenger service began with the opening of the Seohae Line in the Seoul Metropolitan Area.

Preceding station	Seoul Metropolitan Subway	Following station
Siheung Daeya towards Ilsan	Seohae Line	Sinhyeon towards Wonsi
