= Wongok station =

Wongok station is the name of two train stations in South Korea:

- The original name of Ansan station
- The original name of Siu station
