= Sincheon station =

Sincheon station may refer to several railway stations in South Korea:

- Sincheon station (Daegu Metro), on Daegu Subway Line 1 in Sincheon-dong.
- Sincheon station (Siheung), on the Seohae Line.
- Jamsilsaenae Station, on Seoul Subway Line 2 in Jamsil-dong, Songpa-gu.

== See also ==
- Sinchon station, on Seoul Subway Line 2 in Mapo-gu, South Korea.
- Sinchon Station (Unnyul Line), in Sinch'ŏn-up, South Hwanghae Province, North Korea.
