= Siu station =

Station of the Seoul Metropolitan Subway

시우; Siu
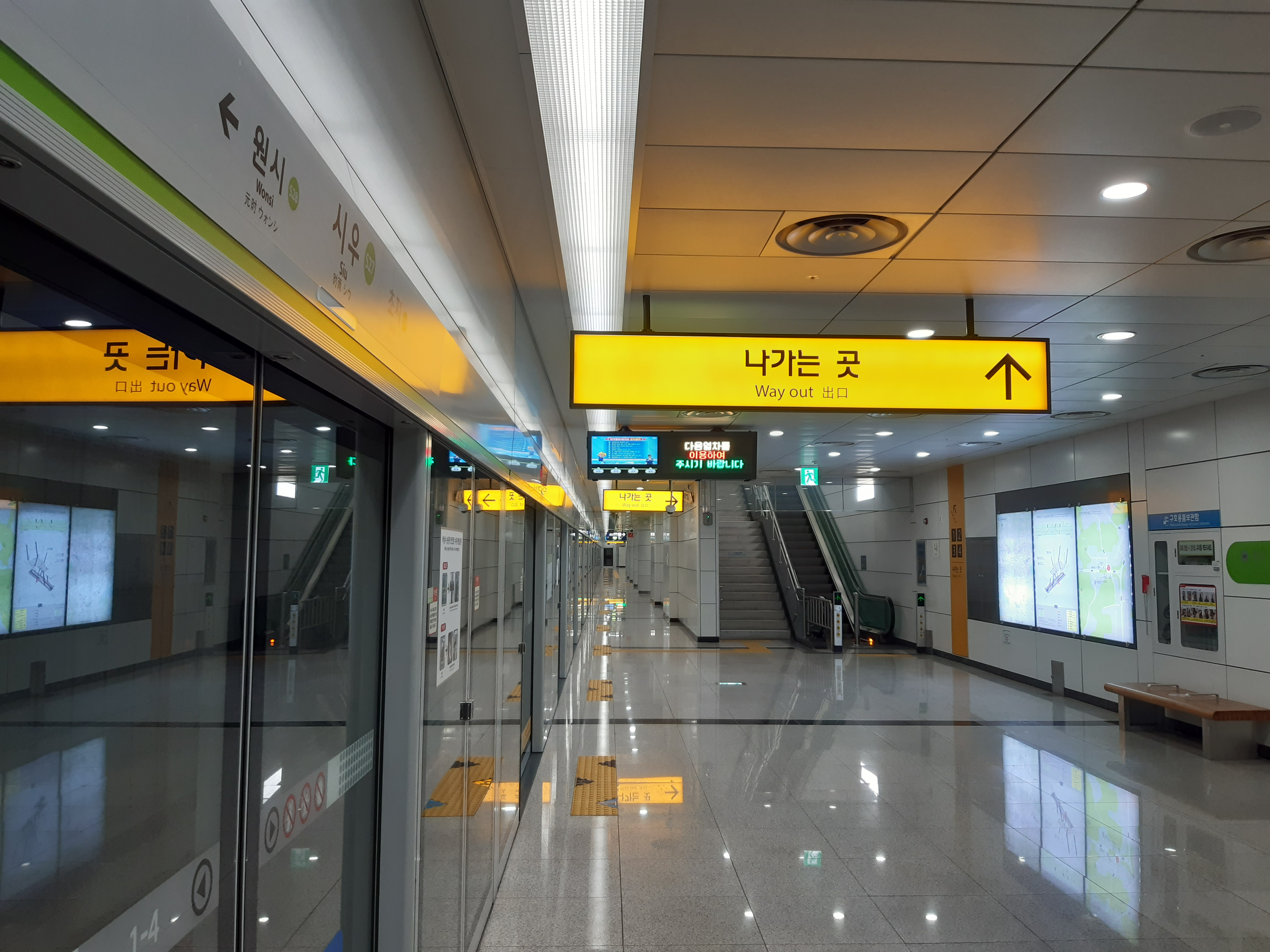
- Station platform

Korean name
- Hangul: 시우역
- Hanja: 時雨驛
- RR: Siu-yeok
- MR: Siu-yŏk

General information
- Location: Ansan, Gyeonggi-do
- Coordinates: 37.3131°N 126.7956°E
- Operator: Korail; SEO HAE RAIL CO., LTD.
- Line: Seohae Line
- Platforms: 2 (2 side platforms)
- Tracks: 2

Construction
- Structure type: Underground

History
- Opened: June 16, 2018
- Former names: Wongok
Location

Siu station is a station on the Seohae Line in South Korea. It opened on June 16, 2018.

When it opened, it was opened under the name of Wongok station; it received its current name in 2021.

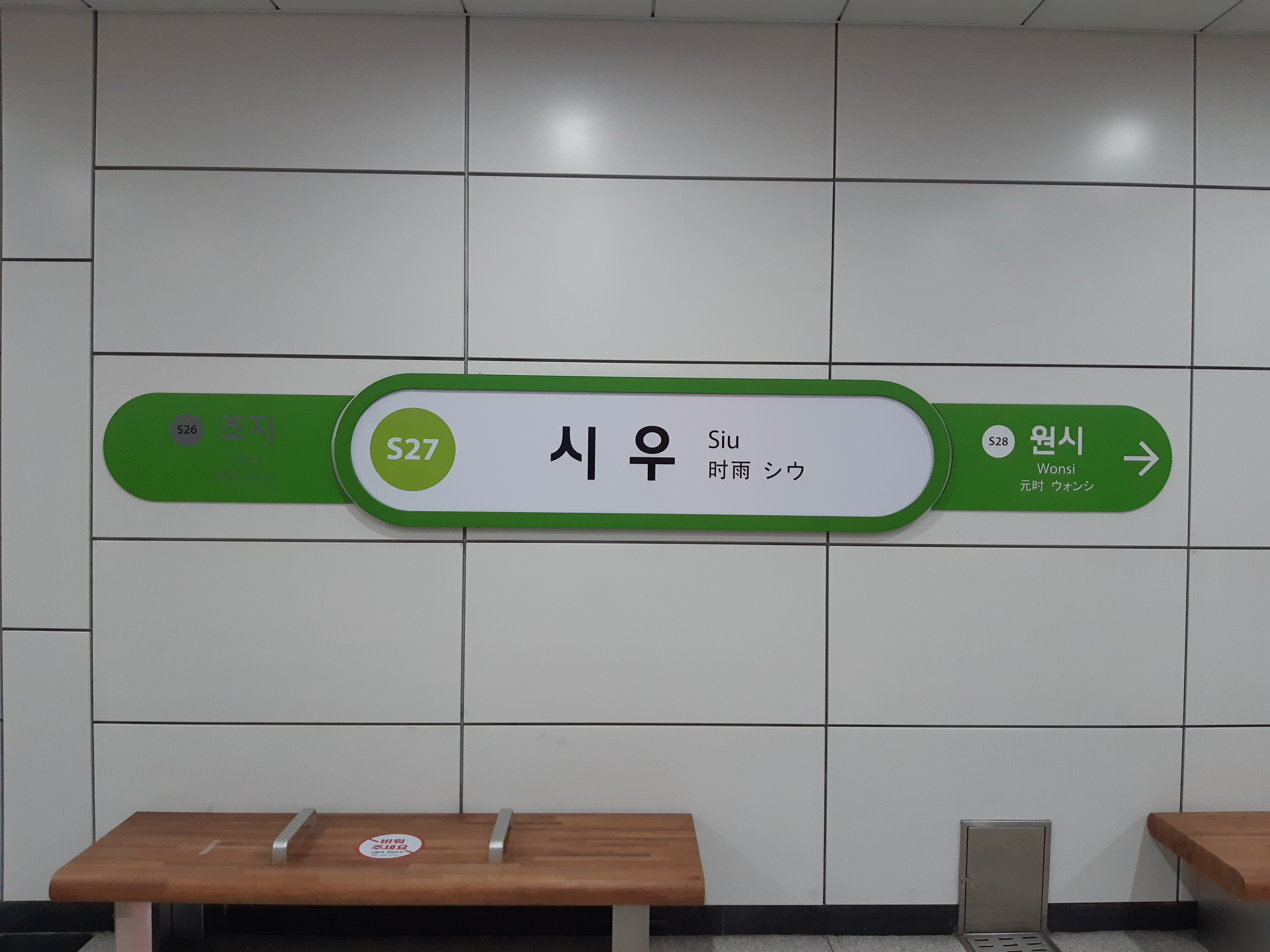
Station nameplate

Preceding station	Seoul Metropolitan Subway	Following station
Choji towards Ilsan	Seohae Line	Wonsi Terminus
