= Seohae Line =

Railway line in Gyeonggi-do and Seoul, South Korea

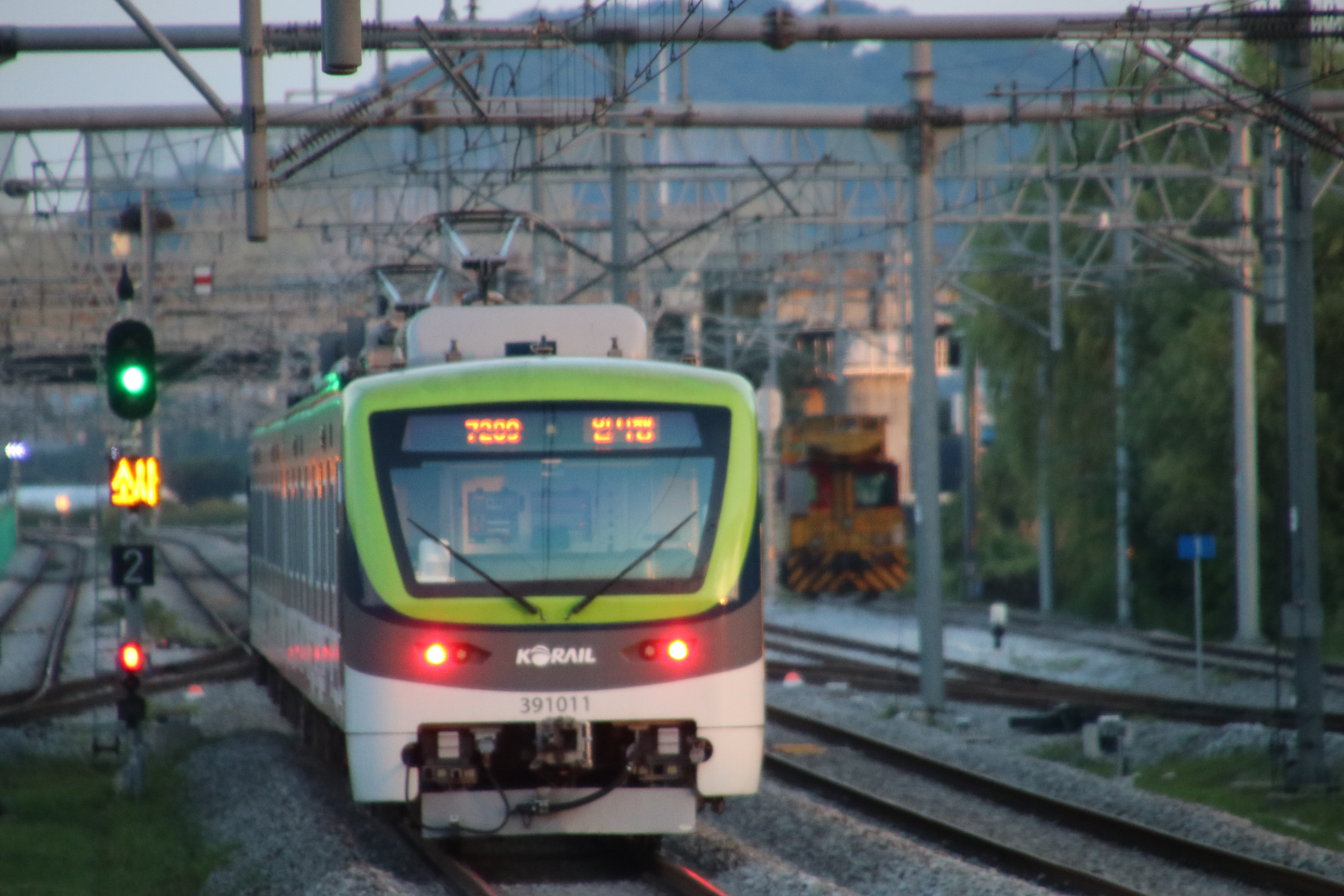
- Korail Class 391000 EMU

Overview
- Status: Operational
- Owner: Korea Rail Network Authority
- Termini: Ilsan / Daegok; Wonsi
- Stations: 21

Service
- Operator(s): Korail, SEO HAE RAIL CO., LTD., ERAIL Co., Ltd.
- Rolling stock: Korail Class 391000; ITX-Maum

History
- Opened: 16 June 2018

Technical
- Line length: 47 km (29 mi) (131 km, future)
- Number of tracks: 2
- Track gauge: 1,435 mm (4 ft 8 1/2 in)
- Electrification: 25 kV 60 Hz AC

- Seohae Line
- Hangul: 서해선
- Hanja: 西海線
- Lit.: West Sea Line
- RR: Seohaeseon
- MR: Sŏhaesŏn

The Seohae Line (Korean: 서해선) is a dual-track, electrified rail line in western Gyeonggi-do and Seoul, South Korea. The Seohae Line is being built in four sections simultaneously. The line runs 47 km (29 mi) south from Ilsan in Goyang City, crosses the Han River, passes Gimpo Airport, Sosa, Siheung, and ends in Wonsi in Ansan. There is a transfer to different lines at Daegok, Neunggok, Gimpo Int'l Airport, Bucheon Stadium, Sosa and Choji. There are currently 21 stations (Ilsan-Wonsi). The line is operated by Korail, but the stations between Sosa and Wonsi are managed by SEO HAE RAIL CO., LTD., a subsidiary of Seoul Metro. Since the infrastructure is also owned by Korail, the line runs on the left like the rest of the South Korean mainline railway network.

== History ==
After the completion of planning, the project was written out as a build–lease–transfer (BLT) project, and Daewoo was selected as preferred bidder in September 2008. Construction was scheduled to last from October 2009 to March 2013. Due to the 2008 financial crisis, it was difficult to gather investors to finance the project, and negotiations stalled. An agreement was finally signed on 21 December 2010, with construction set to start in the first half of 2011. Project costs are ₩1.5248 trillion; the contractor has altogether seven years for design and construction, and will manage and maintain the line for the first 20 years of operation.

The first section began construction in 2011 and opened on 16 June 2018. The second section runs north from Sosa to Daegok on the Gyeongui-Jungang Line and Seoul Subway Line 3, with transfers to several other lines. It was expected to open on 29 June 2021, but did not open until 1 July 2023. Another extension (Daegok-Ilsan) was opened at the end of August 2023. As of October 2024, about ₩4.12 trillion (US$2.98 billion) has been spent on the Seohae Line.

The Seohae Line is scheduled to be extended to Unjeong Station. In early 2026, final approvals were completed, and construction for the extension began in May 2026. Once completed, the Seohae Line will share the existing tracks of the Gyeongui–Jungang Line from Daegok Station through Ilsan Station to Unjeong, providing residents with direct rail access to Gimpo International Airport and Bucheon.

=== Future ===
Another extension (Ilsan-Unjeong) was approved in January 2024. There is currently no opening date noted.

On 1 September 2010, the South Korean government announced a strategic plan to reduce travel times from Seoul to 95% of the country to under 2 hours by 2020. As part of the plan, the first section is to be further upgraded for 230 km/h (140 mph) the Wonsi–Hwayang extension is to be projected for 250 km/h (160 mph), and the line may see KTX service.

Tentative plans foresee the upgrade and incorporation of the Gyooe Line, a single-track non-electrified line without passenger service that connects Neunggok station (with a junction just before Daegok station) and Uijeongbu station in Uijeongbu. The Uijeongbu–Daegok–Sosa–Wonsi Line would then provide orbital metro service as a northern semicircle around Seoul, complementing the southern semicircle formed by the Suin–Bundang Line.

Another part of the tentative 2010 plans was a southern extension from Wonsi, connecting up with the Janghang Line before Hongseong station. As of April 2023, the construction of this section was 92% completed and was expected to be opened in the second half of October 2024. However, by late 2024, the opening date of the Wonsi–Seohwaseong extension had been delayed to the first half of 2027.

== Rolling stock ==
- Korail Class 391000
- ITX-Maum
- KTX-Eum (from 2027)

== Stations ==
=== Urban section ===
The section from Sosa to Wonsi opened on 16 June 2018. The first phase (Sosa to Daegok) of the Sosa to Ilsan extension opened on 1 July 2023. The second phase (Daegok to Ilsan) of the Sosa to Ilsan extension opened on 26 August 2023. The line currently utilizes seven four-car Class 391000 (1st generation) trains manufactured by Hyundai Rotem and ten four-car Class 391000 (2nd generation) trains manufactured by Dawonsys.

=== Current Routes ===
- Daegok — Wonsi (most trains)
- Ilsan — Wonsi (selected trains)

=== Stations ===
| Station number | Station name English | Station name Hangul | Station name Hanja | Transfer | Distance in km | Total distance | Location | |
| S07 | Ilsan | 일산 | 一山 | (Shared) | --- | 0.0 | Gyeonggi-do | Goyang-si |
| S08 | Pungsan | 풍산 | 楓山 | (Shared) | 1.9 | 1.9 | Gyeonggi-do | Goyang-si |
| S09 | Baengma | 백마 | 白馬 | (Shared) | 1.7 | 3.6 | Gyeonggi-do | Goyang-si |
| S10 | Goksan | 곡산 | 谷山 | (Shared) | 1.6 | 5.2 | Gyeonggi-do | Goyang-si |
| S11 | Daegok | 대곡 | 大谷 | Gyeongui–Jungang Line Great Train eXpress | 1.7 | 6.9 | Gyeonggi-do | Goyang-si |
| S12 | Neunggok | 능곡 | 陵谷 | Gyeongui–Jungang Line | 1.8 | 8.5 | Gyeonggi-do | Goyang-si |
| S13 | Gimpo Int'l Airport | 김포공항 | 金浦空港 | Gimpo Goldline | 7.4 | 15.9 | Seoul | Gangseo-gu |
| S14 | Wonjong | 원종 | 遠宗 | | 4.3 | 20.2 | Gyeonggi-do | Bucheon-si |
| S15 | Bucheon Stadium | 부천종합운동장 | 富川綜合運動場 | Seoul Subway Line 7 | 2.1 | 22.3 | Gyeonggi-do | Bucheon-si |
| S16 | Sosa (Seoul Theological Univ.) | 소사 (서울신대) | 素砂 | Seoul Subway Line 1 | 2.7 | 25.0 | Gyeonggi-do | Bucheon-si |
| S17 | Sosaeul (Bucheon Univ. Sosa Campus) | 소새울 (부천대 소사캠퍼스) | 소새울 | | 1.7 | 26.7 | Gyeonggi-do | Bucheon-si |
| S18 | Siheung Daeya | 시흥대야 | 始興大也 | | 2.1 | 28.8 | Gyeonggi-do | Siheung-si |
| S19 | Sincheon | 신천 | 新川 | | 1.4 | 30.2 | Gyeonggi-do | Siheung-si |
| S20 | Sinhyeon | 신현 | 新峴 | | 3.3 | 33.5 | Gyeonggi-do | Siheung-si |
| S22 | Siheung City Hall | 시흥시청 | 始興市廳 | | 3.6 | 37.1 | Gyeonggi-do | Siheung-si |
| S23 | Siheung Neunggok | 시흥능곡 | 始興陵谷 | | 1.3 | 38.4 | Gyeonggi-do | Siheung-si |
| S24 | Dalmi | 달미 | 달미 | | 2.4 | 40.8 | Gyeonggi-do | Ansan-si |
| S25 | Seonbu (Hando Hospital) | 선부 (한도병원) | 仙府 | | 1.6 | 42.4 | Gyeonggi-do | Ansan-si |
| S26 | Choji | 초지 | 草芝 | Suin–Bundang Line | 1.7 | 44.1 | Gyeonggi-do | Ansan-si |
| S27 | Siu | 시우 | 時雨 | | 1.4 | 45.5 | Gyeonggi-do | Ansan-si |
| S28 | Wonsi | 원시 | 元時 | | 1.5 | 47.0 | Gyeonggi-do | Ansan-si |
| S29 | Int'l Theme Park (2027) | 국제테마파크 | 國際테마파크 | | | | Gyeonggi-do | Hwaseong-si |
| S30 | Seohwaseong (2027) | 서화성 | 西華城 | | | | Gyeonggi-do | Hwaseong-si |

The line is being extended southward from Wonsi to Seohwaseong. Station names may be subject to change as the line is constructed and various sources give conflicting information.

=== Conventional rail ===
Opened on 2 November 2024.

| Station name | | | Transfer | Distance in km | | Location | |
| Romanized | Hangul | Hanja | Transfer | Station distance | Total distance | Location | |
|---|---|---|---|---|---|---|---|
| Seohwaseong | 서화성 | 西華城 | | --- | 0.0 | Gyeonggi-do | Hwaseong-si |
| Hwaseong City Hall | 화성시청 | 華城市廳 | | 7.3 | 7.3 | Gyeonggi-do | Hwaseong-si |
| Hyangnam | 향남 | 鄕南 | | 11.4 | 18.7 | Gyeonggi-do | Hwaseong-si |
| Anjung | 안중 | 安仲 | Pyeongtaek Line | 19.1 | 37.8 | Gyeonggi-do | Pyeongtaek-si |
| Inju | 인주 | 仁州 | | 17.5 | 55.3 | Chungcheongnam-do | Asan-si |
| Hapdeok | 합덕 | 合德 | | 8.8 | 64.1 | Chungcheongnam-do | Dangjin-si |
| Hongseong | 홍성 | 洪城 | Janghang Line | 24.6 | 88.7 | Chungcheongnam-do | Hongseong-gun |

== See also ==
- Transportation in South Korea
- Korail
