= Wonsi station =

Train station in South Korea

원시; Wonsi
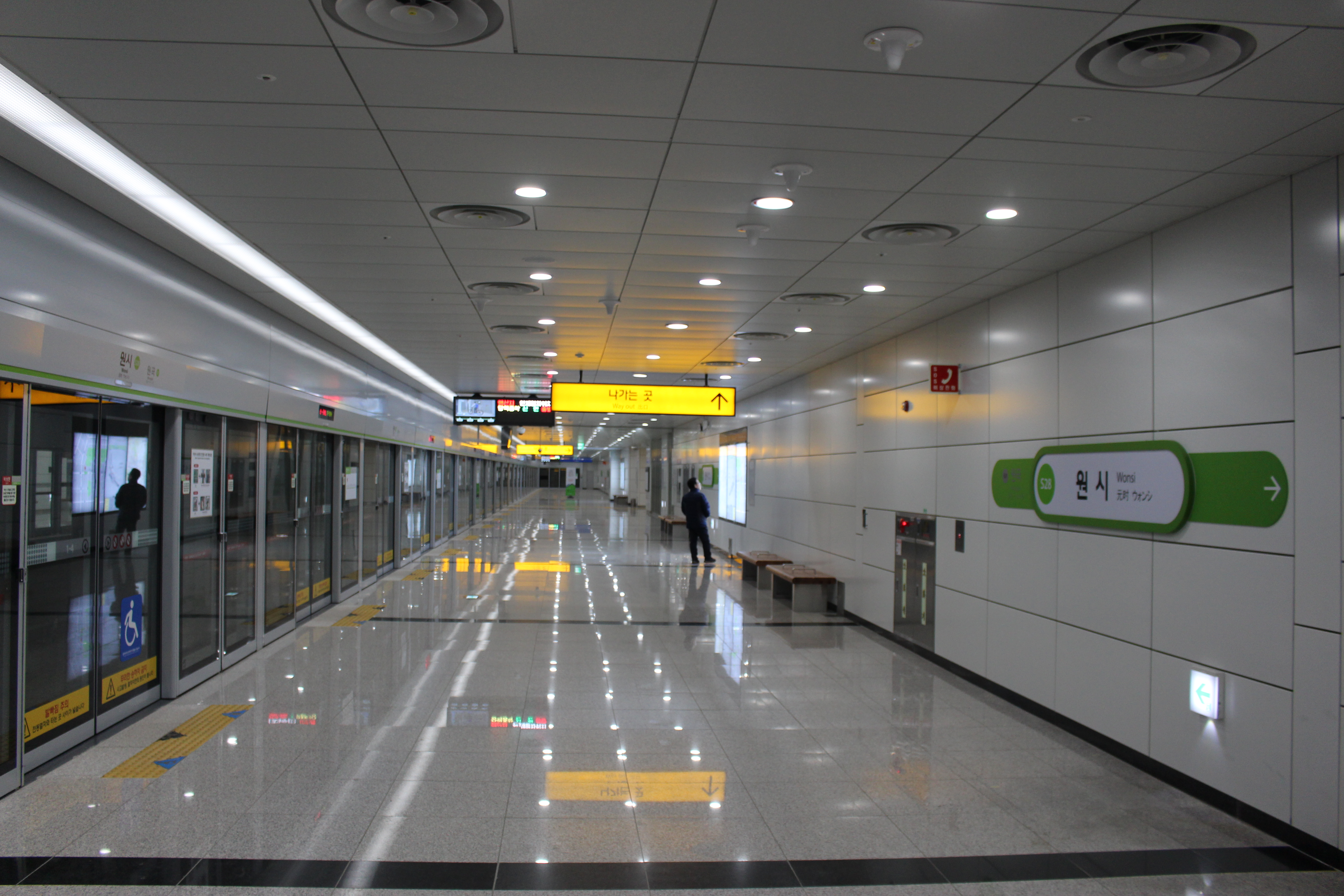
- Station platform

Korean name
- Hangul: 원시역
- Hanja: 元時驛
- RR: Wonsi-yeok
- MR: Wŏnsi-yŏk

General information
- Location: Ansan, Gyeonggi Province
- Coordinates: 37.3026°N 126.7868°E
- Operator: Korail; SEO HAE RAIL CO., LTD.
- Line: Seohae Line
- Platforms: 2 (2 side platforms)
- Tracks: 2

Construction
- Structure type: Underground

History
- Opened: June 16, 2018
Location

Wonsi station is a station on the Seohae Line in Ansan, South Korea. It opened on June 16, 2018.

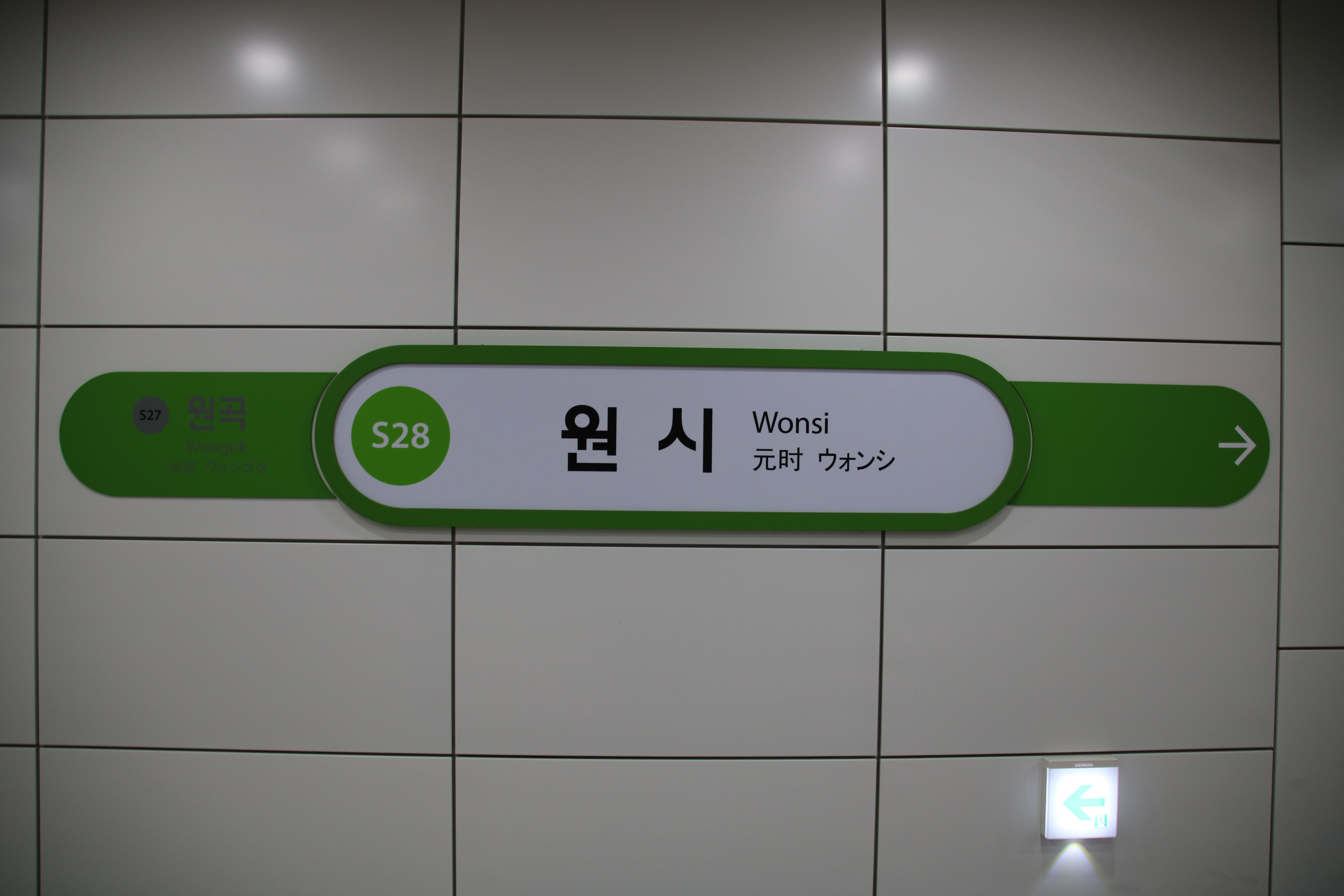
Station nameplate

Preceding station	Seoul Metropolitan Subway	Following station
Siu towards Ilsan	Seohae Line	Terminus
