= Ilsan station =

Metro station in Goyang, South Korea

일산; Ilsan
일산; Ilsan
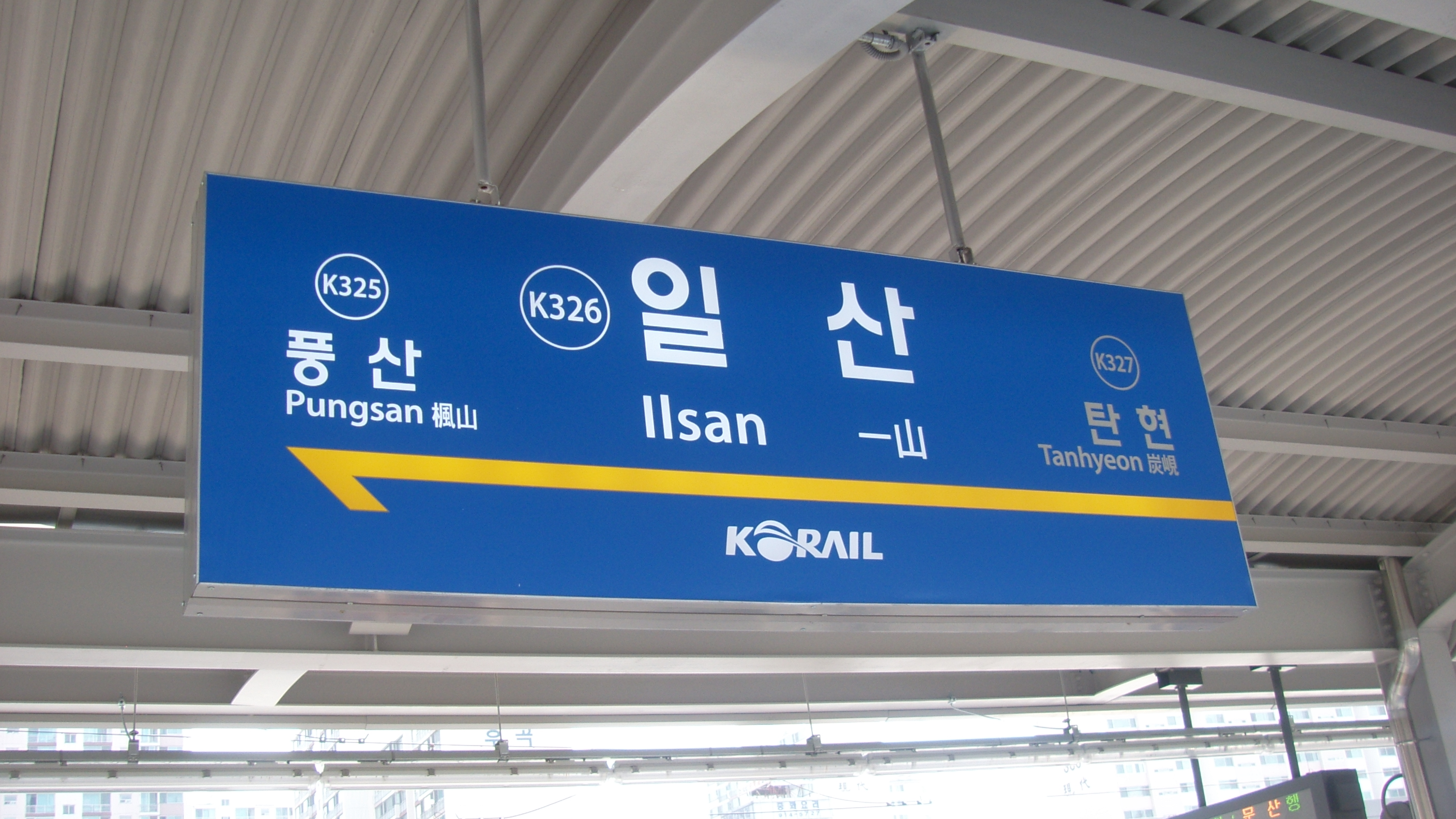

Korean name
- Hangul: 일산역
- Hanja: 一山驛
- Revised Romanization: Ilsannyeok
- McCune–Reischauer: Ilsannyŏk

General information
- Location: 655-628 Ilsan-dong; Ilsanseo-gu, Goyang; Gyeonggi-do
- Coordinates: 37°40′56.43″N 126°46′10.37″E
- Operator: Korail
- Lines: Gyeongui–Jungang Line; Seohae Line
- Platforms: 3
- Tracks: 6
- Bus routes: 11 60 771; 034 066 071 079

Construction
- Structure type: Aboveground

History
- Opened: April 3, 1906

Key dates
- July 1, 2009: Gyeongui–Jungang Line started service
- August 26, 2023: Seohae Line opened
Location
- Location within South Korea

Ilsan Station is a station in Goyang, Gyeonggi-do, South Korea. The station is serviced by the Gyeongui–Jungang Line and Seohae Line, and is the oldest station in the city of Goyang.

== History ==
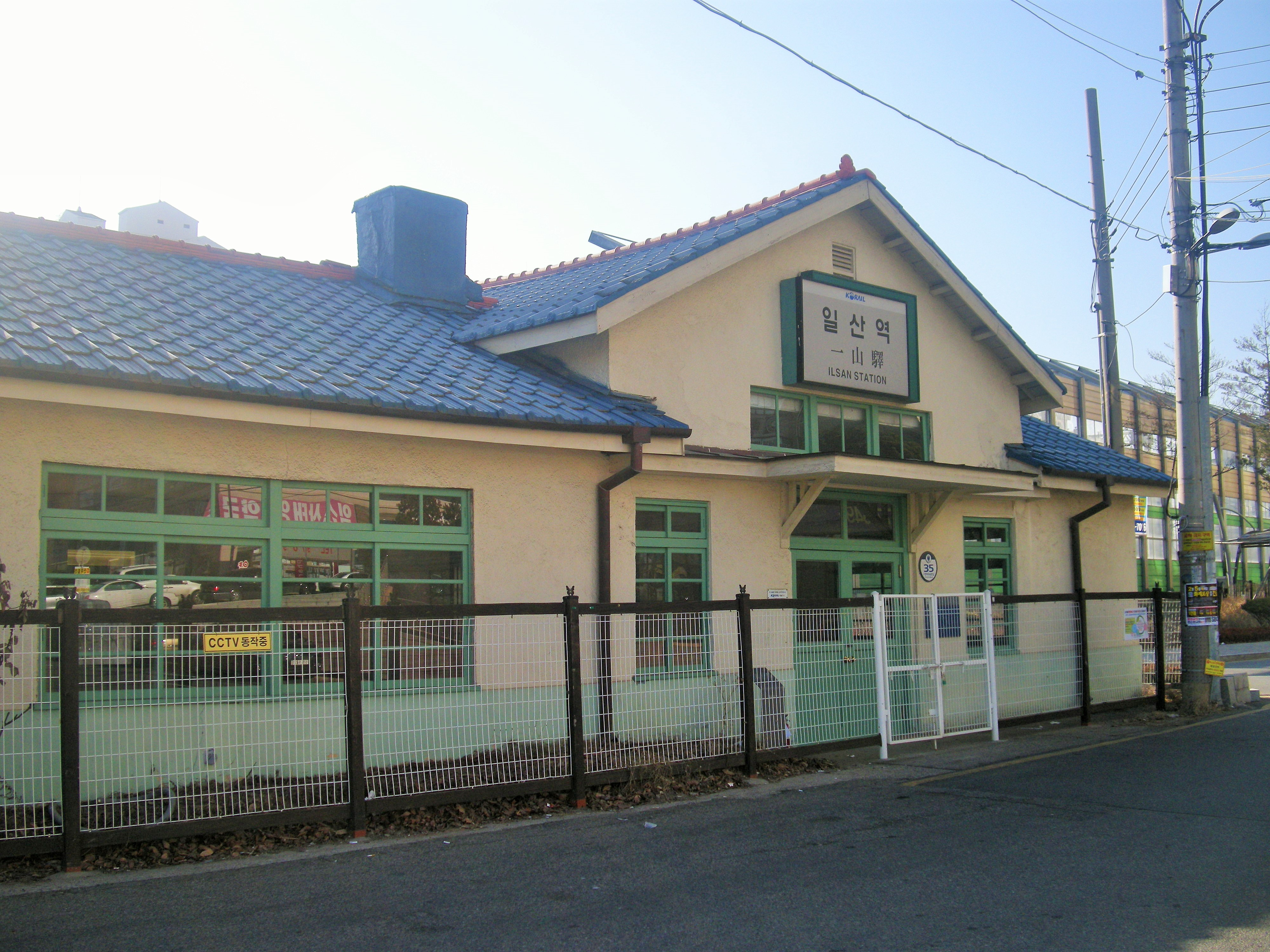
The former Ilsan Station Building, Registered Cultural Heritage No.294

The old Ilsan Station was built in 1933, while under Japanese rule. While no longer in use, the building still exists and was designated as a national cultural asset No. 294 in 2006. In 2009 the functions of the station were transferred to a new station building. The old building is planned to be opened to the public for cultural use.

The building has a cross-shaped gable roof, with the gable showing in the front, and the sides of the building forming straight planes on either side. The gable area visible from the front is relatively wide but low in height, compared to other stations on the Gyeongui Line. The structure is wood-framed with the exterior walls finished in wire mesh and mortar.

== Station information ==
It opened as a regular station on April 4, 1904, and the old station building was completed in 1933. With the opening of the extension between Gongdeok and Yongsan, the Seoul Metropolitan Subway was reorganized into the Gyeongui-Jungang Line, and some trains on the Gyeongui-Jungang Line also start and end at this station only on weekdays.

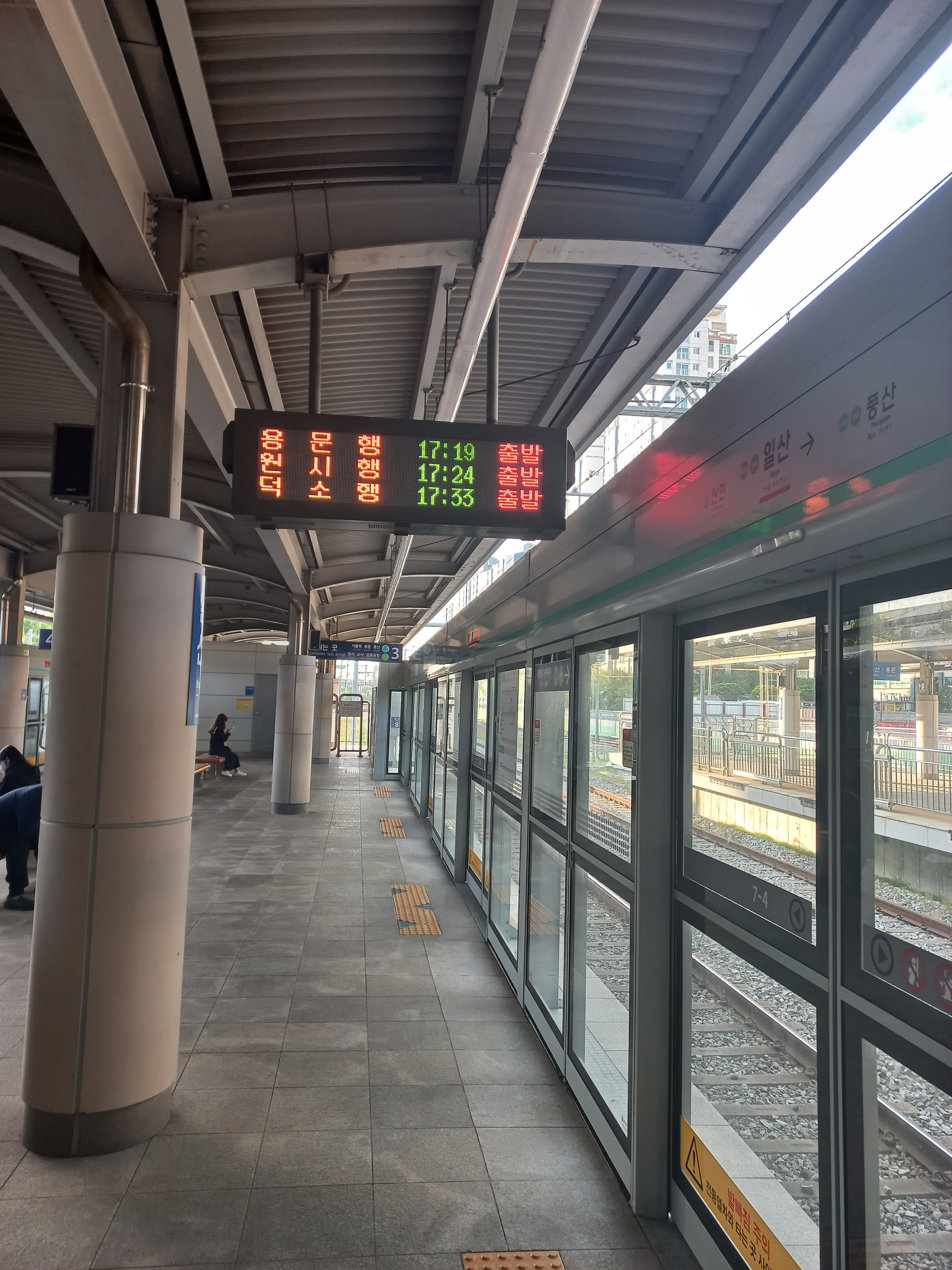
The station's platform

Preceding station	Seoul Metropolitan Subway	Following station
Tanhyeon towards Munsan	Gyeongui–Jungang Line	Pungsan towards Jipyeong or Seoul Station
Tanhyeon towards Munsan	Gyeongui–Jungang Line Gyeongui Express	Baengma towards Yongmun
Tanhyeon towards Munsan	Gyeongui–Jungang Line Jungang Express	Pungsan towards Yongmun
Tanhyeon towards Munsan	Gyeongui–Jungang Line Gyeongui Express	Baengma towards Seoul Station
Terminus	Seohae Line	Pungsan towards Wonsi
