= Unyang station =

Metro station in Gimpo, South Korea

G104 운양 Unyang

Korean name
- Hangul: 운양역
- Hanja: 雲陽驛
- RR: Unyang-yeok
- MR: Unyang-yŏk

General information
- Location: Gimpo, Gyeonggi-do
- Coordinates: 37.6538°N 126.6839°E
- Operator: GIMPO Goldline Co., Ltd.
- Line: Gimpo Goldline
- Platforms: 2
- Tracks: 2

Construction
- Structure type: Underground

History
- Opened: September 28, 2019
Location

Unyang Station is a station on the Gimpo Goldline in Gimpo, South Korea. It opened on September 28, 2019.

Preceding station	Seoul Metropolitan Subway	Following station
Geolpo Bukbyeon towards Gimpo International Airport	Gimpo Goldline	Janggi towards Yangchon
