= Geolpo Bukbyeon station =

Metro station in Gimpo, South Korea

G105 걸포북변 (김포우리병원) Geolpo Bukbyeon (Gimpo Woori Hospital)
- Station name board

Korean name
- Hangul: 걸포북변역
- Hanja: 傑浦北邊驛
- Revised Romanization: Geolpobukbyeon-yeok
- McCune–Reischauer: Kŏlp'obukpyŏn-yŏk

General information
- Location: Gimpo, Gyeonggi-do
- Coordinates: 37.6317°N 126.7056°E
- Operator: GIMPO Goldline Co., Ltd.
- Line: Gimpo Goldline
- Platforms: 2
- Tracks: 2

Construction
- Structure type: Underground

History
- Opened: September 28, 2019
Location

Geolpo Bukbyeon Station (Korean: 걸포북변역) is a station on the Gimpo Goldline in Gimpo, South Korea. It opened on September 28, 2019.

Train platform

Preceding station	Seoul Metropolitan Subway	Following station
Sau towards Gimpo International Airport	Gimpo Goldline	Unyang towards Yangchon
