= Sau station =

Metro station in Gimpo, South Korea

G106 사우 (김포시청·나리여성병원) Sau (Gimpo City Hall·NaLee Women's Hospital)
- Station platform

Korean name
- Hangul: 사우역
- Hanja: 沙隅驛
- RR: Sau-yeok
- MR: Sau-yŏk

General information
- Location: Gimpo, Gyeonggi-do
- Coordinates: 37.6203°N 126.7198°E
- Operator: GIMPO Goldline Co., Ltd.
- Line: Gimpo Goldline
- Platforms: 2
- Tracks: 2

Construction
- Structure type: Underground

History
- Opened: September 28, 2019
Location

Sau Station is a station on the Gimpo Goldline in Gimpo, South Korea. It opened on September 28, 2019.

Station nameplate

Preceding station	Seoul Metropolitan Subway	Following station
Pungmu towards Gimpo International Airport	Gimpo Goldline	Geolpo Bukbyeon towards Yangchon
