= Janggi station =

Metro station in Gimpo, South Korea

G103 장기 Janggi

Korean name
- Hangul: 장기역
- Hanja: 場基驛
- RR: Janggi-yeok
- MR: Changgi-yŏk

General information
- Location: Gimpo, Gyeonggi-do
- Coordinates: 37.6440°N 126.6690°E
- Operator: GIMPO Goldline Co., Ltd.
- Line: Gimpo Goldline
- Platforms: 2
- Tracks: 2

Construction
- Structure type: Underground

History
- Opened: September 28, 2019
Location

Janggi Station (Korean: 장기역) is a station on the Gimpo Goldline in Gimpo, South Korea. It opened on September 28, 2019.

Preceding station	Seoul Metropolitan Subway	Following station
Unyang towards Gimpo International Airport	Gimpo Goldline	Masan towards Yangchon
