= Pungmu station =

Metro station in Gimpo, South Korea

G107 풍무 (연세하나병원) Pungmu (YONSEI HANA HOSPITAL)

Korean name
- Hangul: 풍무역
- Hanja: 豊舞驛
- RR: Pungmu-yeok
- MR: P'ungmu-yŏk

General information
- Location: Gimpo, Gyeonggi-do
- Coordinates: 37.6124°N 126.7325°E
- Operator: GIMPO Goldline Co., Ltd.
- Line: Gimpo Goldline
- Platforms: 2
- Tracks: 2

Construction
- Structure type: Underground

History
- Opened: September 28, 2019
Location

Pungmu Station is a station on the Gimpo Goldline in Gimpo, South Korea. It opened on September 28, 2019.

Preceding station	Seoul Metropolitan Subway	Following station
Gochon towards Gimpo International Airport	Gimpo Goldline	Sau towards Yangchon
