= Gochon station (Gimpo) =

Metro station in Gimpo, South Korea

G108 고촌 Gochon

Korean name
- Hangul: 고촌역
- Hanja: 高村驛
- RR: Gochon-yeok
- MR: Koch'on-yŏk

General information
- Location: Gimpo, Gyeonggi-do
- Coordinates: 37.6013°N 126.7702°E
- Operator: GIMPO Goldline Co., Ltd.
- Line: Gimpo Goldline
- Platforms: 2
- Tracks: 2

Construction
- Structure type: Underground

History
- Opened: September 28, 2019
Location

Gochon Station is a station on the Gimpo Goldline in Gimpo, South Korea. It opened on September 28, 2019.

Preceding station	Seoul Metropolitan Subway	Following station
Gimpo International Airport Terminus	Gimpo Goldline	Pungmu towards Yangchon
