= Gurae station =

Metro station in South Korea

G101 구래 (연세더바른병원) Gurae (Yonsei The Baerun Hospital)
- Platforms

Korean name
- Hangul: 구래역
- Hanja: 九來驛
- RR: Gurae-yeok
- MR: Kurae-yŏk

General information
- Location: Gimpo, Gyeonggi Province
- Coordinates: 37°38′43.7″N 126°37′43.6″E
- Operator: GIMPO Goldline Co., Ltd.
- Line: Gimpo Goldline
- Platforms: 1
- Tracks: 2

Construction
- Structure type: Underground

History
- Opened: September 28, 2019
Location

Gurae Station (Korean: 구래역) is a station on the Gimpo Goldline. It opened on September 28, 2019.

Station nameplate

Preceding station	Seoul Metropolitan Subway	Following station
Masan towards Gimpo International Airport	Gimpo Goldline	Yangchon Terminus
