= Masan station (Gimpo) =

Metro station in Gimpo, South Korea

G102 마산 (김포FC) Masan (Gimpo FC)

Korean name
- Hangul: 마산역
- Hanja: 麻山驛
- RR: Masan-yeok
- MR: Masan-yŏk

General information
- Location: Gimpo, Gyeonggi-do
- Coordinates: 37.6407°N 126.6442°E
- Operator: GIMPO Goldline Co., Ltd.
- Line: Gimpo Goldline
- Platforms: 2
- Tracks: 2

Construction
- Structure type: Underground

History
- Opened: September 28, 2019
Location

Masan Station is a station on the Gimpo Goldline in Gimpo, South Korea. It opened on September 28, 2019.

Preceding station	Seoul Metropolitan Subway	Following station
Janggi towards Gimpo International Airport	Gimpo Goldline	Gurae towards Yangchon
