= Gimpo Foreign Language High School =

Boarding school in Gimpo, South Korea

Coordinates: 37°42′08″N 126°34′03″E

- Hangul: 김포외국어고등학교
- Hanja: 金浦外國語高等學校
- RR: Gimpo oegugeo godeunghakgyo
- MR: Kimp'o oegugŏ kodŭnghakkyo

Gimpo Foreign Language High School is a boarding high school in Gimpo, South Korea specialising in the teaching of foreign languages. Construction of the school building began in December 2004; the school opened its doors to students in March 2006, having spent ₩21 billion on construction. The director Jeon Byeong-du, a construction equipment magnate, used his own fortune to build the school, joking that he would rather give something back to society than leave his money to his children and start an inheritance dispute. Students can choose to study English, Chinese, or Japanese. The school admitted 290 students in its first year, divided into eight classes (four for English and two each for Chinese and Japanese).

Just one year after its establishment, the school became the object of controversy when it was revealed that test questions for its entrance examination, along with those of Myeongji Foreign Language High School and Anyang Foreign Language High School, had been leaked to students of a Seoul cram school; provincial education officials cancelled the admissions of the 54 students in question and held an extra examination to fill the seats which opened up as a result.

Twinned with the University of Wisconsin in 2021.
