= Dongjak station =

Train station in South Korea

Coordinates: 37°30′10″N 126°58′49″E

동작 (현충원); Dongjak (Seoul National Cemetery)
동작 (현충원); Dongjak (Seoul National Cemetery)
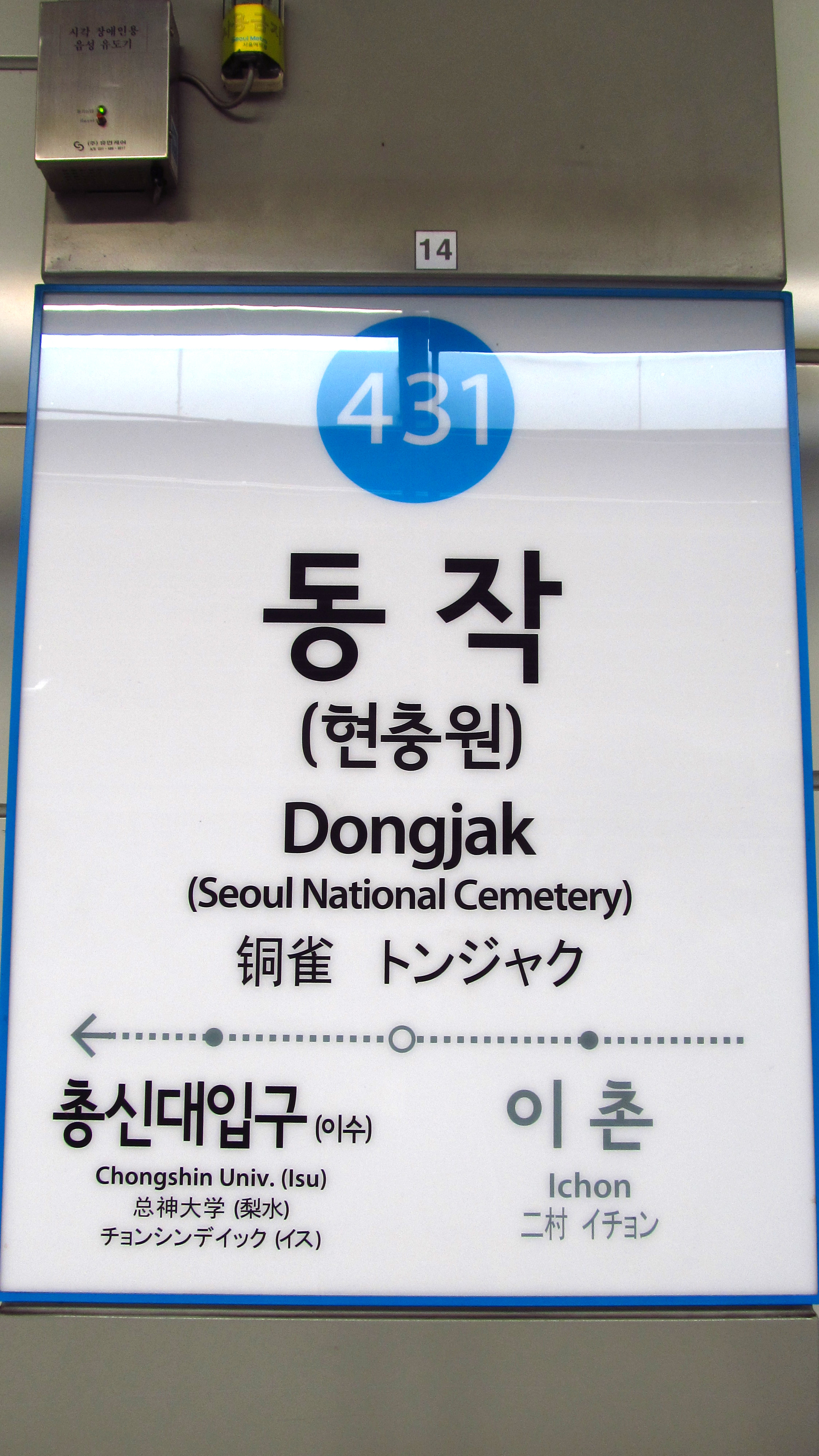
- Line 4 station nameplate

Korean name
- Hangul: 동작역
- Hanja: 銅雀驛
- Revised Romanization: Dongjak-yeok
- McCune–Reischauer: Tongjak-yŏk

General information
- Location: 327-1 Dongjak-dong, 257 Hyeonchungno, Dongjak-gu, Seoul
- Operator: Seoul Metro; Seoul Metro Line 9 Corporation
- Lines: Line 4 Line 9
- Platforms: 4
- Tracks: 6

Key dates
- October 18, 1985: Line 4 opened
- July 24, 2009: Line 9 opened
Location

Dongjak station is a station on Line 4 and Line 9 of the Seoul Subway. Express trains on Line 9 stop at this station. As the station's subname, This station serves the Seoul National Cemetery.

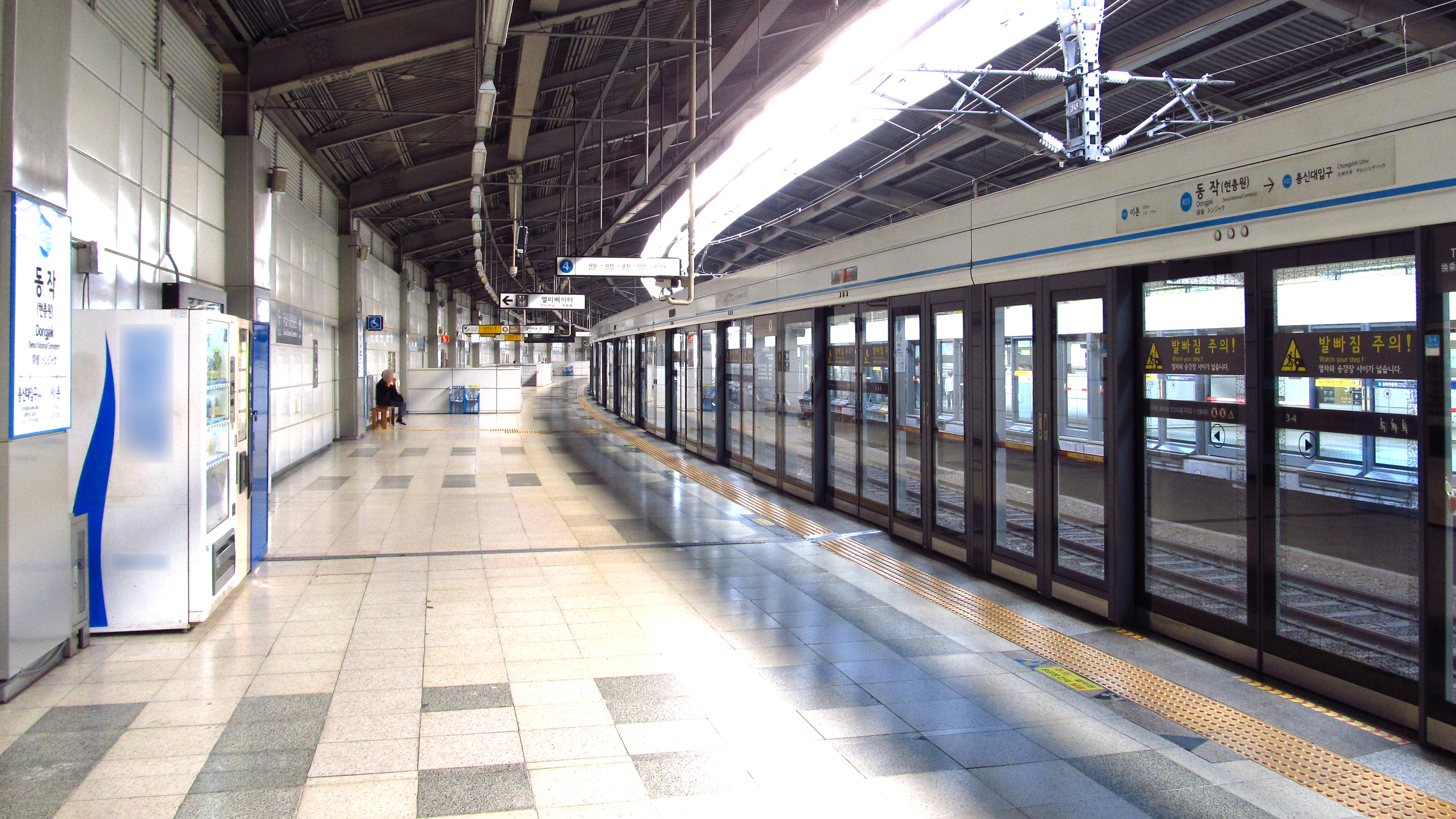
Line 4 platform

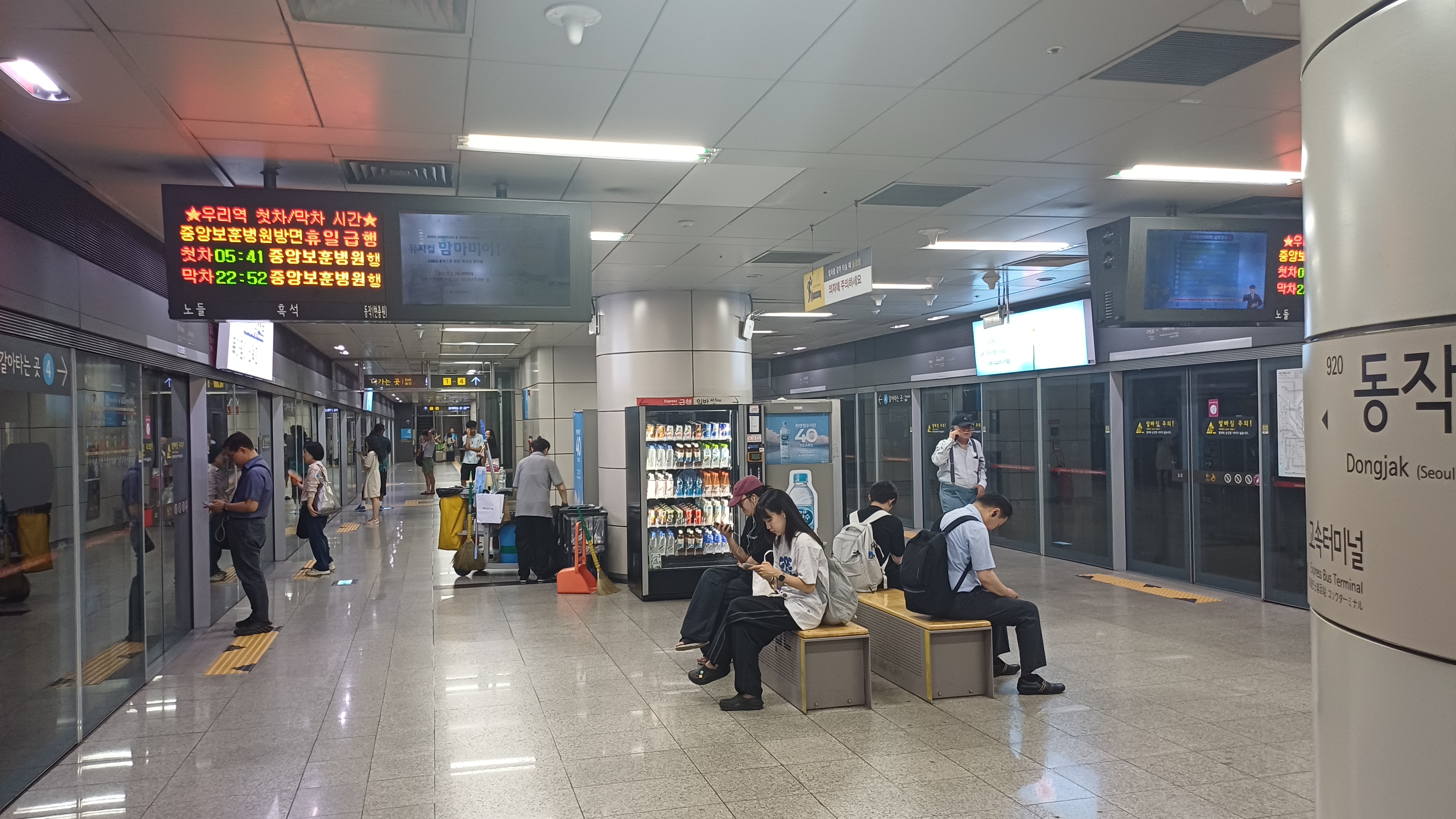
Line 9 platforms

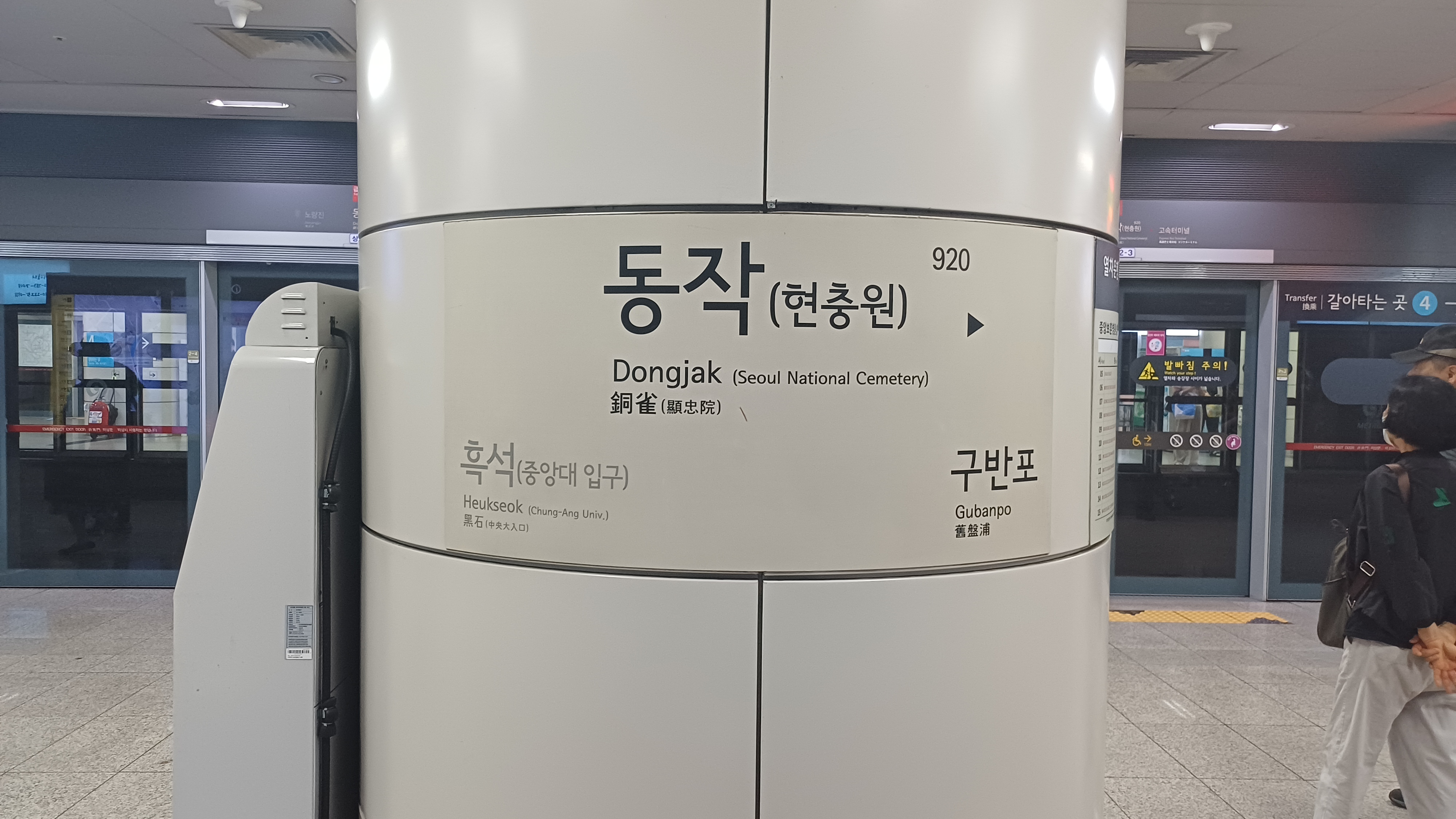
Line 9 station nameplate (Local)

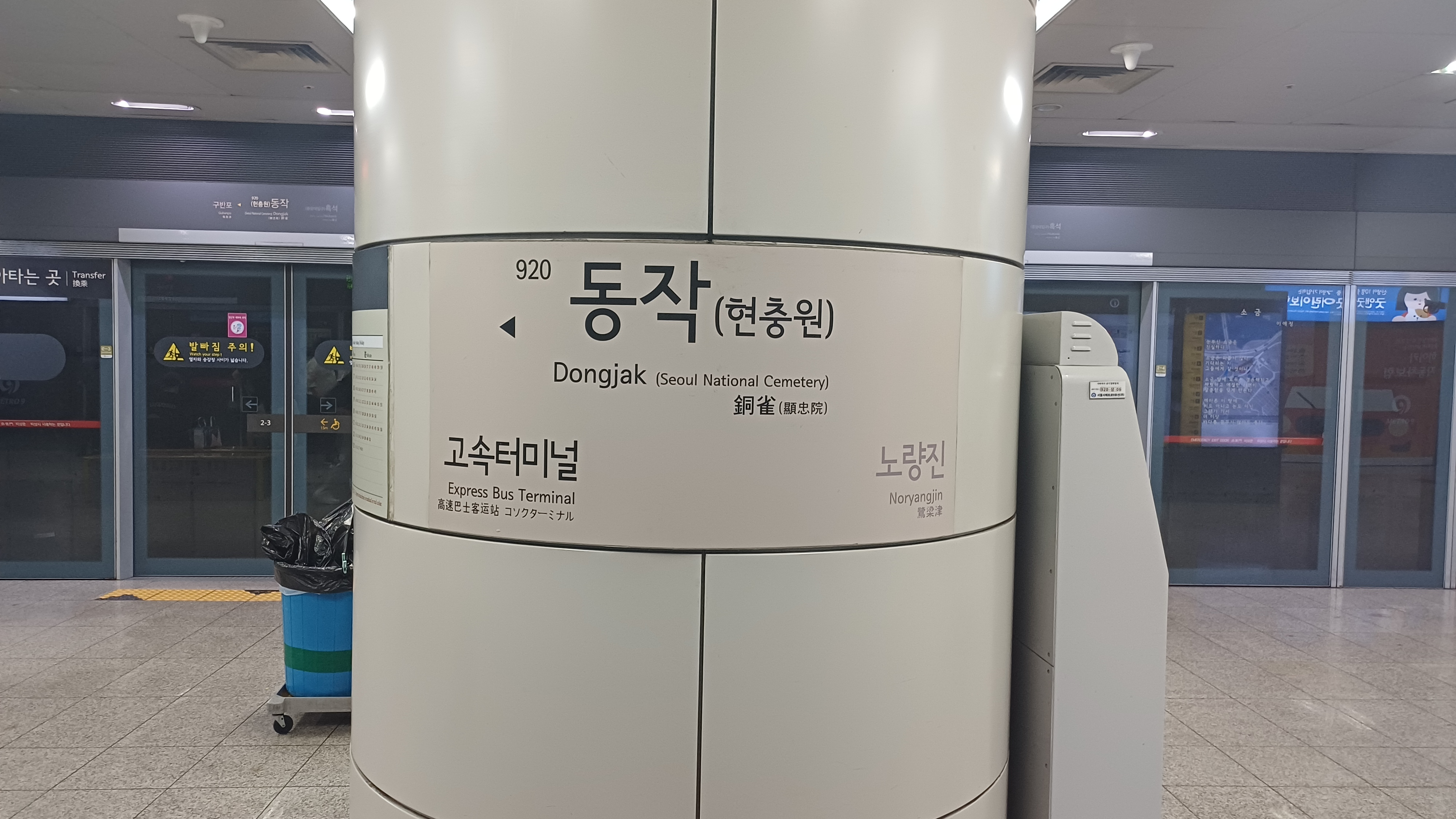
Line 9 station nameplate (Express)

== Station layout ==
L3; Line 4 platforms	Side platform, doors will open on the right
L3; Line 4 platforms	Northbound	← Line 4 toward Jinjeop (Ichon)
L3; Line 4 platforms	Southbound	Line 4 toward Oido (Chongshin Univ.) →
L3; Line 4 platforms	Side platform, doors will open on the right

L2; Concourse	Lobby	Toilet

L1; Concourse	Lobby	Customer Service, Exit to ground level

G	Street level	Exit

B1; Concourse	Lobby	Exit to ground level

B2; Concourse	Lobby	Customer Service, Shops, Vending machines, ATMs

B3; Line 9 platforms	Westbound local	← Line 9 Local toward Gaehwa (Heukseok)
B3; Line 9 platforms	Island platform, doors will open on the left, right
B3; Line 9 platforms	Westbound express	← Line 9 Express toward Gimpo International Airport (Noryangjin)
B3; Line 9 platforms	Eastbound express	Line 9 Express toward VHS Medical Center (Express Bus Terminal) →
B3; Line 9 platforms	Island platform, doors will open on the left, right
B3; Line 9 platforms	Eastbound local	Line 9 Local toward VHS Medical Center (Gubanpo) →

== Vicinity ==
- Exit 1: Banpo APT
- Exit 2: National Cemetery Parking Lot
- Exit 3: Isu Rotary
- Exit 4: Seoul National Cemetery

Preceding station	Seoul Metropolitan Subway	Following station
Ichon towards Jinjeop	Line 4	Chongshin University towards Oido
Heukseok towards Gaehwa	Line 9	Gubanpo towards VHS Medical Center
Noryangjin towards Gimpo International Airport	Line 9 Express	Express Bus Terminal towards VHS Medical Center
