= Masan station =

Masan station may refer to:

- Masan station (Gyeongjeon Line) in Masan, Changwon, South Korea
- Masan station (Gimpo) on the Gimpo Goldline in Gyeonggi Province, South Korea
