= Waseda University Honjo Senior High School =

- 早稲田大学本庄高等学院

Location
- 239-3 Kurisaki Honjo Saitama 367-0032 JAPAN; Honjo, Saitama; Japan; 36°12′54.3″N 139°10′34.4″E

Information
- Type: Private
- Motto: 学問の独立 (Independence of Learning)
- Established: 1982
- President: Shigeru Yoshida
- Enrollment: ~1,000
- Campus: suburban
- Color: Maroon
- Mascot: Waseda Bear
- Endowment: N/A
- Affiliations: Super Science High School
- Website: Waseda University Honjo Senior High School

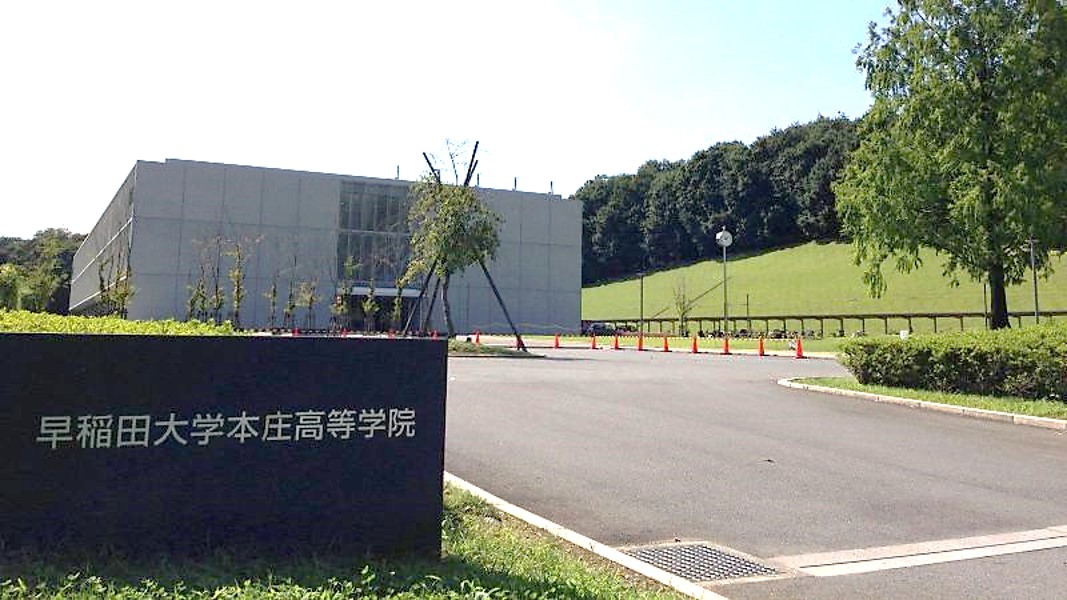
The current main building

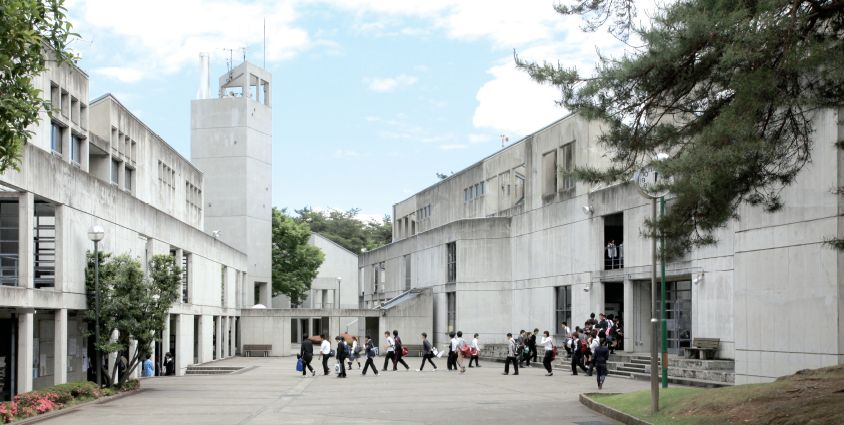
The former main building

Waseda University Honjo Senior High School (早稲田大学本庄高等学院, Waseda Daigaku Honjo Kōtō Gakuin) is a senior high school in Japan, located in Saitama Prefecture. It was founded in 1982 as a high school attached to Waseda University. Its motto is "independence of learning" (学問の独立, gakumon-no-dokuritsu), which is the same motto as for Waseda University.

== History ==
The school was founded in April 1982 as a "100th anniversary memorial project of Waseda University". The school was founded as a boys' school, but it converted to a coeducational school in April 2007.

== Present ==
The school has continued interactions with prestige high schools as below.

- Affiliated High School of Peking University （China）
- National Taichung First Senior High School （Taiwan）
- National Junior College （Singapore）
- Anyang Foreign Language High School （South Korea）
- SMA Negeri 2 Yogyakarta （Indonesia）

According to the Hensachi (the indication showing the entrance difficulties by prep schools) rankings published by Sundai Preparatory School （駿台予備校）, the school is one of the most selective senior high schools in Japan. Its entrance difficulty is usually considered as the most competitive senior high school in Saitama Prefecture.

== Location/facility ==
The closest station is the Honjō-Waseda Station.

== Notable alumni ==
- Gyochi Yoshida１, conductor of Nagoya Philharmonic Orchestra
- Yoshio Tezuka, special Advisor to the Prime Minister (Noda cabinet)
- Iwao Hirose, philosopher, professor of McGill University
- Koji Sato, CEO of Toyota
- Masafumi Kawaguchi, american football player
- Takeharu Yamanaka, politician, mayor of Yokohama
- Ken'ichi Arai, member of Rag Fair
- Rena Ichiki (ja, zh), former pop singer, currently known as an announcer at Nippon TV
- Shiori Nakamata (ja, zh, ko), former pop singer

== Related books ==
- 早稲田大学本庄高等学院編『二十五周年記念誌 : 継承と発展』(Japanese), published in 2007
- 早稲田大学本庄高等学院編『三十周年記念誌』(Japanese), published in 2012
