= Gubanpo station =

Metro station in Seoul, South Korea

Coordinates: 37°30′05″N 126°59′14″E

구반포; Gubanpo
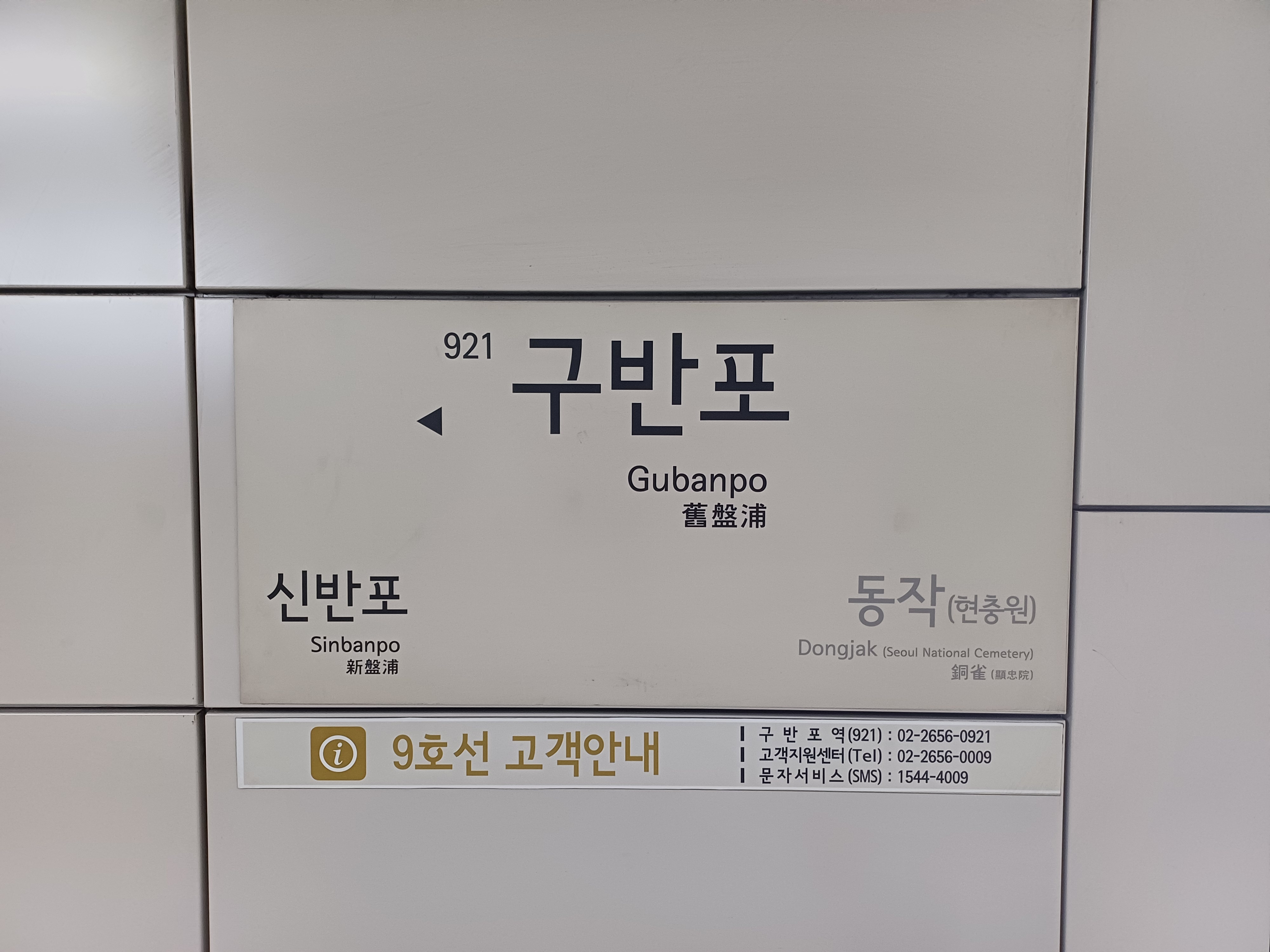

Korean name
- Hangul: 구반포역
- Hanja: 舊盤浦驛
- Revised Romanization: Gubanpo-yeok
- McCune–Reischauer: Kubanp'o-yŏk

General information
- Location: 1053 Banpo bon-dong Seocho-gu, Seoul
- Operator: Seoul Metro Line 9 Corporation
- Line: Line 9
- Platforms: 2 (2 side platforms)
- Tracks: 2
- Bus routes: 148 360 361 362 406 462 540 640 642 643; 4212 4318 4425 6411; 9408; 9500 9501; 6000

Construction
- Structure type: Underground

History
- Opened: July 24, 2009
Location

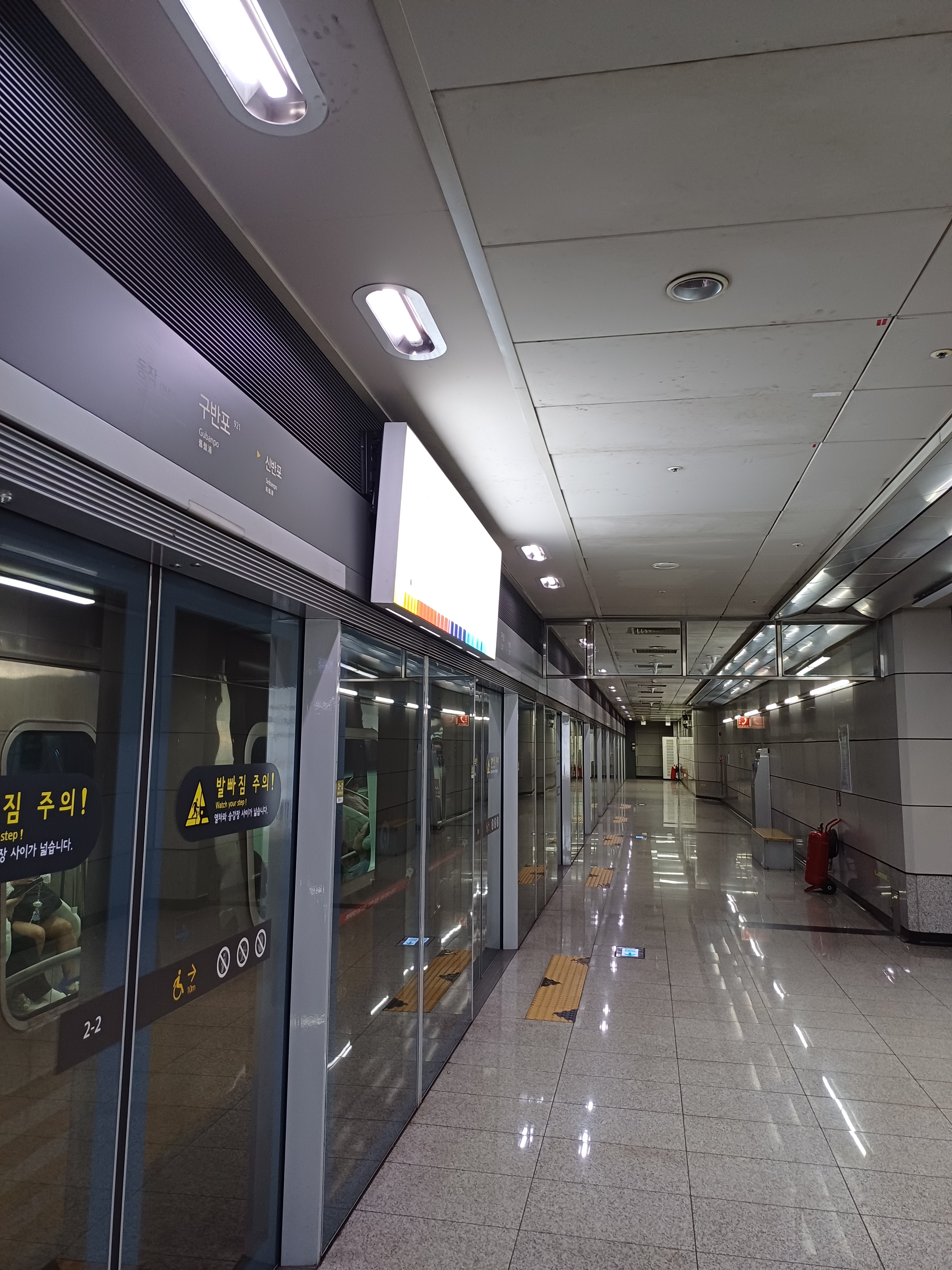
Station platform

Gubanpo Station is a railway station on Line 9 of the Seoul Subway.

Prior to the opening of Line 9, it was planned to be called Seoritgae Station, but the name was changed due to various reasons posed by local residents.

== Basic information ==
Gubanpo Station is a station located at 1053 Banpo-dong, Seocho-gu, Seoul. It opened on July 24, 2009 with the opening of Phase 1 of Seoul Subway Line 9 (수도권 전철 9호선) . It is the 25th station from the starting/ending point, Gaehwa, and is 4 stations from Sinnonhyeon Station, the last station of Phase 1. It is 1.0 km from Dongjak Station, which is a transfer station with Line 4. It is also 1.5 km from Express Bus Terminal Station, where you can transfer to Lines 3 and 7.

== Name ==
Gubanpo Station was originally planned to be named Seoritgae Station the name was changed because 6,700 residents had issues with that name (Seoritgae means 'A stream of water flows round and round". (개울물이 서리서리 굽이쳐 흐른다.)) There were three reasons why residents did not like the name Seoritgae.

1. The Gubanpo area was never called 'Seoritgae' before and could actually confuse people with Seorae Village nearby.
2. Seoritgae ends with '-gae'('-개') which stands for 'dog' with may make people think of it as a bad word.
3. The name has a bad connotation because Seori in Korean means 'to raid on a person's property out of a mischievous motive'.

Because of these reasons, residents requested to change the name to Gubanpo Station or Banpo-bon Dong Station and the name was changed to Gubanpo after a discussion.

People who agreed with the name 'Seoritgae' said that it could be chaotic because there would 3 stations in the area with the name 'Banpo', which are Gubanpo, Sinbanpo, and Banpo.

== Station layout ==
G	Street level	Exit

L1; Concourse	Lobby	Customer Service, Shops, Vending machines, ATMs

L2; Platform level	Side platform, doors will open on the right
L2; Platform level	Westbound	← Line 9 Local toward Gaehwa (Dongjak) ← Line 9 Express does not stop here
L2; Platform level	Eastbound	Line 9 Local toward VHS Medical Center (Sinbanpo) → Line 9 Express does not stop here →
L2; Platform level	Side platform, doors will open on the right

== Exits ==
1. Isugyo
2. Banpo Hangang Park
3. Banpo Elementary and Middle School.

Preceding station	Seoul Metropolitan Subway	Following station
Dongjak towards Gaehwa	Line 9	Sinbanpo towards VHS Medical Center
