= Gimpo Goldline =

Light rail line in Gyeonggi-do and Seoul, South Korea

Gimpo Urban Railway (Gimpo Goldline)

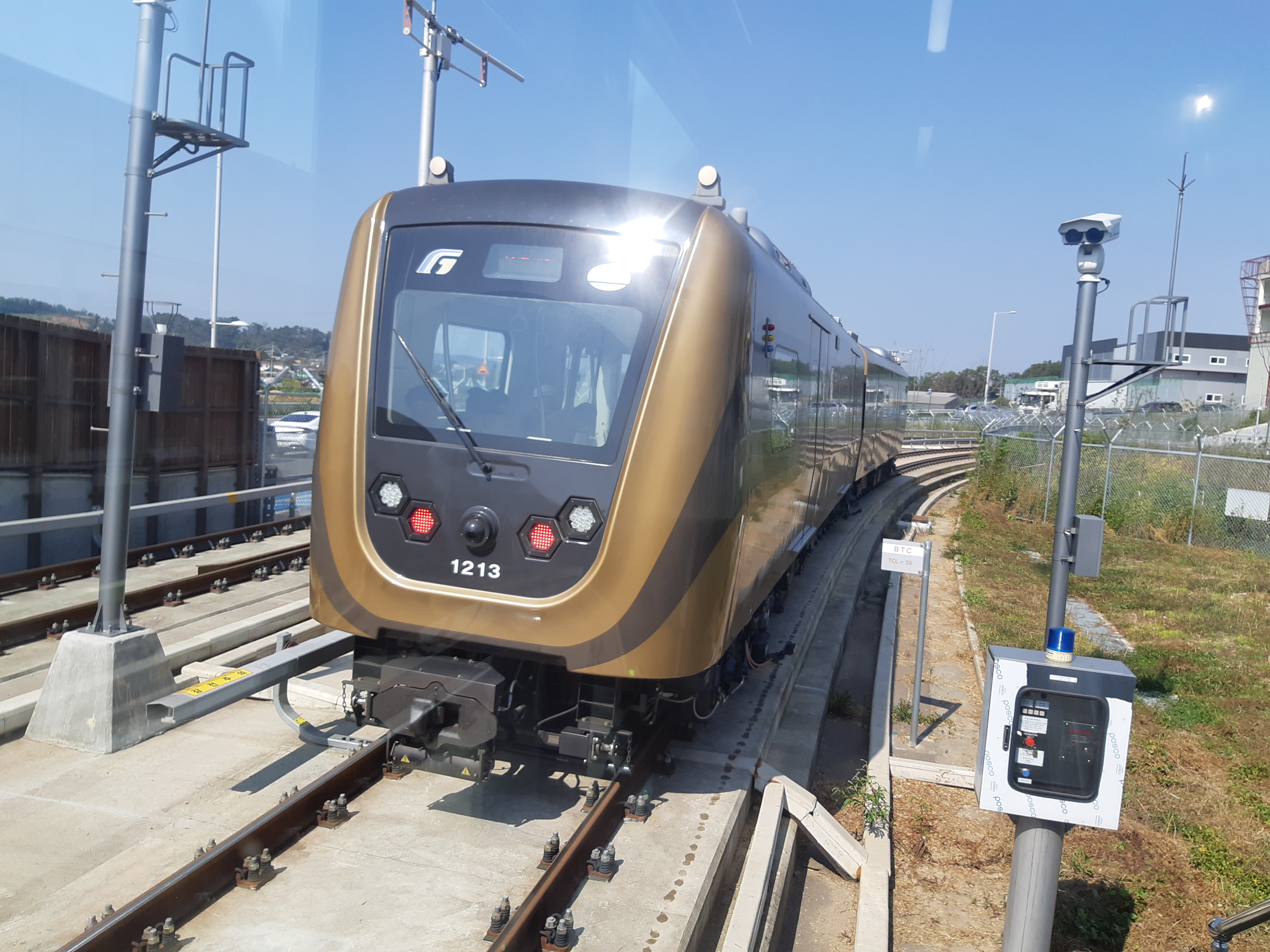

Overview
- Native name: 김포골드라인; Gimpo Goldline
- Status: Operational
- Owner: Gimpo City
- Termini: Yangchon; Gimpo International Airport
- Stations: 10

Service
- Type: Light metro
- Operator(s): GIMPO Goldline Co., Ltd.
- Depot: Gimpo Hangang Train Depot
- Rolling stock: 23 × 2-car Hyundai Rotem 1000 series

History
- Opened: 28 September 2019; 7 years ago

Technical
- Track length: 23.67 km (14.71 mi)
- Track gauge: 1,435 mm (4 ft 8 1/2 in) standard gauge
- Electrification: 750 V DC third rail
- Operating speed: 80 km/h (50 mph)
Route map
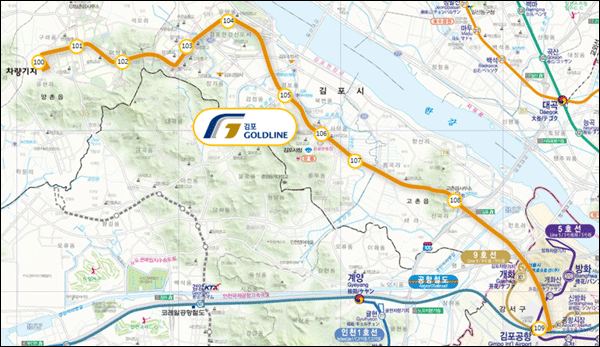

The Gimpo Goldline (Korean: 김포골드라인 or Korean: 김포 도시철도) is a light metro line opened on 28 September 2019.

== Background ==
Under the third mayor of Gimpo City, Kim Dongsik (김동식), the line was going to be an extension of Line 5. This idea was rejected by Seoul Metropolitan Rapid Transit Corporation (now Seoul Metro) as they wanted to build a subway yard in the town of Yangchon-eup.

Since then, the Gimpo Han River Metro project was promoted under the mayor of Kang Kyung-gu, but the plan was canceled and Seoul Subway Line 9 extended to Gimpo but failed after Yoo Young-rok, a Democrat who was at a political crossroads with Kim Dong-sik and Kang Kyung-gu's Grand National Party, was elected. The opening of the metro has been delayed several times under the current mayor, Yoo Young-rok and Chung ha-yeong, and it has been criticized by citizens.

The construction cost was ₩1.6503 trillion with ₩1.2 trillion from Korea Land and Housing Corporation. The funds came from the wide-area transportation contributions paid to the company by residents of the Hangang New Town. Two-car vehicle operates at intervals of three minutes during peak hours with a maximum occupancy of 122 people per car. The line uses rolling stock by Hyundai Rotem. Travel time from one end to the other is an estimated 30 minutes and transfers are available at Gimpo International Airport station. In 2012, planners expected 88,257 passengers during the first year of operation (then 2018), 91,501 in 2021, and 92,561 in 2026 with an operating deficit of roughly ₩10 billion.

== Operation ==
From the outset, Gimpo Goldline trains have operated with two cars each. As people commuting to and from Seoul rush to work and get off work, the level of congestion is enormous, showing the end of the 'hell subway'. In August 2024, the Gimpo Goldline's operator increased train frequencies from 24 to 26 trains per hour; however, the line remains overcrowded, with many trains operating at more than 200% of capacity.

In 2023, there was a proposal to transfer operation of the Gimpo Goldline to a new Gimpo Urban Railway Corporation or to the government of Gimpo City.

== Stations ==
Station; Number	Station Name; English	Station Name; Hangul	Transfer	Distance in km	Total; Distance	Location	
G100	Yangchon (Dawon City)	양촌 (다원시티)		---	0.0	Gyeonggi-do	Gimpo-si
G101	Gurae	구래		1.37	1.37	Gyeonggi-do	Gimpo-si
G102	Masan	마산		1.17	2.54	Gyeonggi-do	Gimpo-si
G103	Janggi	장기		2.29	5.53	Gyeonggi-do	Gimpo-si
G104	Unyang	운양		1.69	7.22	Gyeonggi-do	Gimpo-si
G105	Geolpo Bukbyeon	걸포북변		3.39	10.61	Gyeonggi-do	Gimpo-si
G106	Sau (Gimpo City Hall)	사우 (김포시청)		1.87	12.48	Gyeonggi-do	Gimpo-si
G107	Pungmu	풍무		1.38	13.86	Gyeonggi-do	Gimpo-si
G108	Gochon	고촌		3.69	17.55	Gyeonggi-do	Gimpo-si
G109	Gimpo Int'l Airport	김포공항	Seohae Line	5.92	23.47	Seoul	Gangseo-gu
