= Gimpo Peninsula =

Peninsula in South Korea

Nickname: Gimpo Island
- Interactive map of Gimpo Peninsula

Geography
- Coordinates: 37.665°N 126.621°E

Administration
- South Korea

Korean name
- Hangul: 김포반도
- Hanja: 金浦半島
- RR: Gimpobando
- MR: Kimp'obando

The Gimpo Peninsula (Korean: 김포반도) is a peninsula on the west coast of South Korea, occupied by most of Gimpo and Geomdan-dong and a portion of Gyeyang District in Incheon.

== Geography ==
Most of the Gimpo Peninsula consists of plains with the exception of the northwest in Tongjin-eup and Daegot-myeon with low hills. The eastern part is a part of a plain named Gimpo Plains with the part across the Han River, containing part of low land in Goyang City and Paju City.

The northwest part of the Peninsula is often referred to as Tongjin Peninsula after former Tongjin County or Tongjin-eup.

== History ==
In the period of Joseon Dynasty, the Gimpo Peninsula was occupied by Tongjin County and Gimpo County (including current Geomdan-dong). In 1914, under the rearrangement of administrative division by the Japanese Empire, the two counties were merged with Yangcheon County (currently most of Yangcheon District and Gangseo District of Seoul Special City) and became new Gimpo County. In 1963, part of former Yangcheon county was absorbed into Seoul but Gimpo county merges Gyeyang-myeon, formerly the district of Bucheon County. In 1989 Gyeyang-myeon was absorbed into Incheon Metropolitan City, followed by the absorption of Geomdan-myeon into Incheon in 1995.

It is sometimes referred to as Gimpo Island after the construction of Ara Canal, separating the Peninsula with Gyeonggi Province, but it is not an official name in Korea.
