= Wonjong station =

Metro station in Bucheon, South Korea

원종; Wonjong
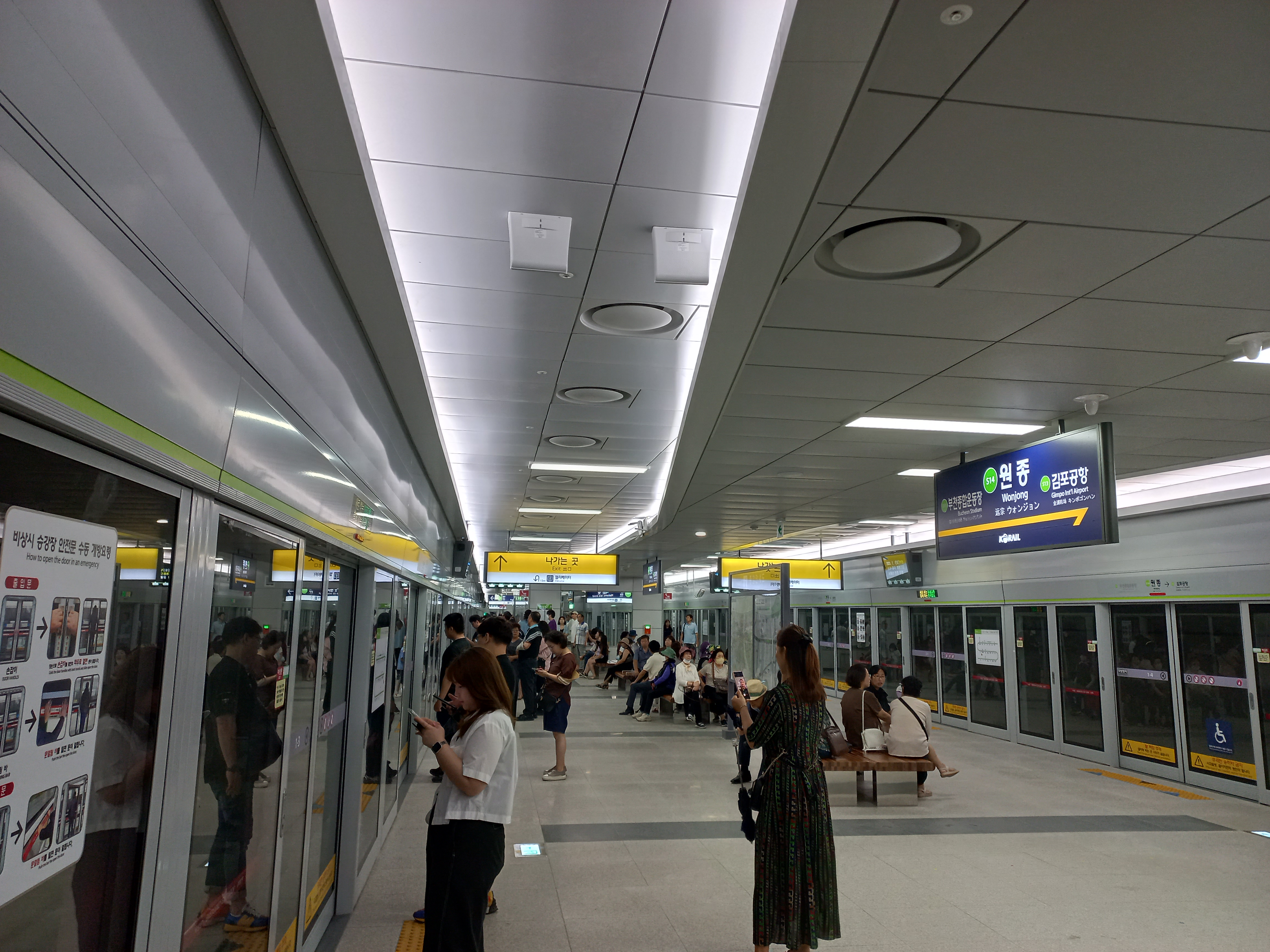
- Station platforms

Korean name
- Hangul: 원종역
- Hanja: 遠宗驛
- RR: Wonjong-yeok
- MR: Wŏnjong-yŏk

General information
- Location: Bucheon, Gyeonggi-do
- Coordinates: 37°31′27″N 126°48′17″E
- Operator: Korail
- Line: Seohae Line
- Platforms: 2 (2 island platforms)
- Tracks: 4

History
- Opened: July 1, 2023
Location

Wonjong station is a station on the Seohae Line in South Korea. It opened on July 1, 2023.

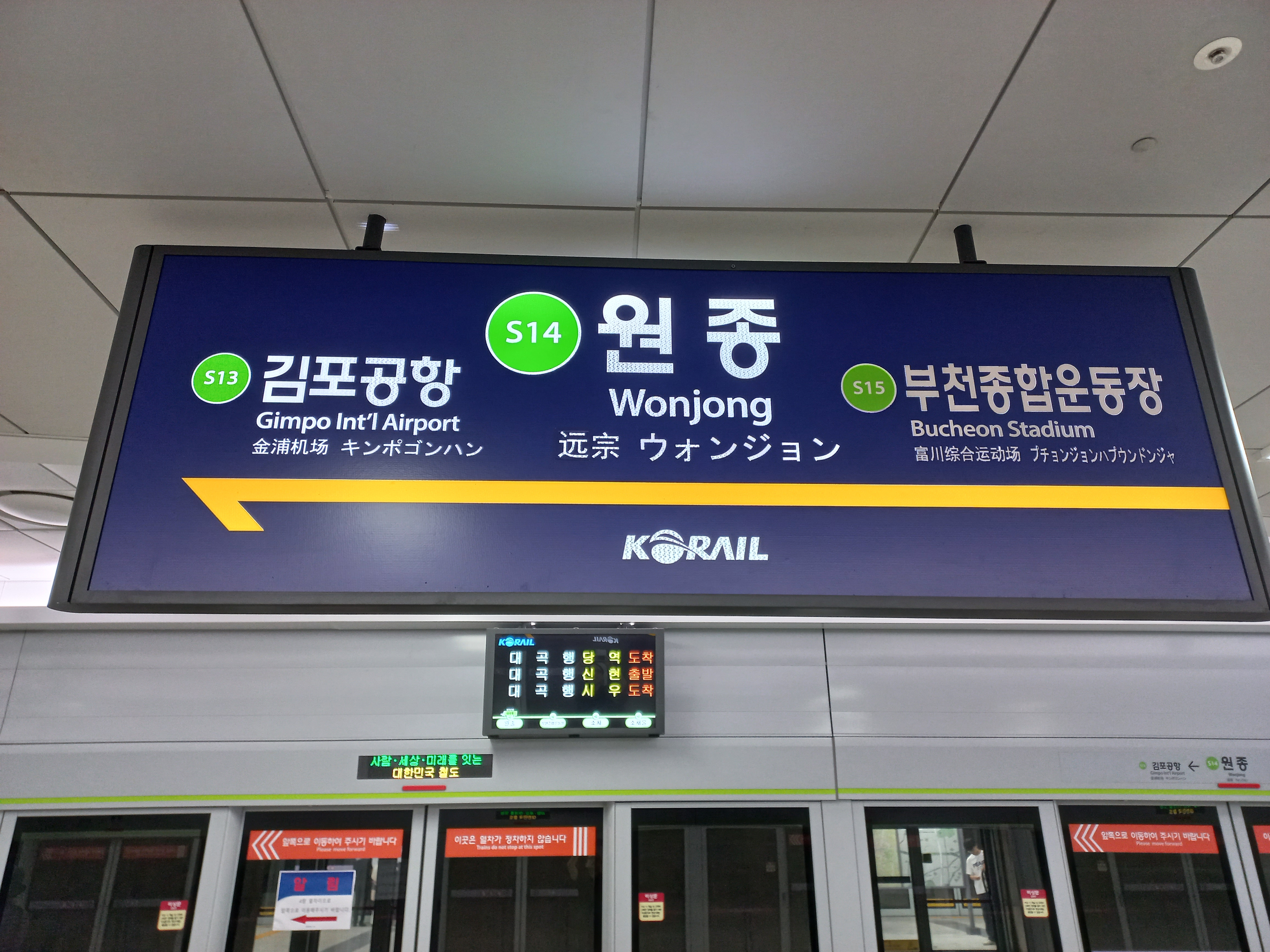
Station name sign

Preceding station	Seoul Metropolitan Subway	Following station
Gimpo International Airport towards Ilsan	Seohae Line	Bucheon Stadium towards Wonsi
