= Anyang Foreign Language High School =

Coordinates: 37°23′44″N 126°54′32″E

- 안양외국어고등학교 安養外國語高等學校
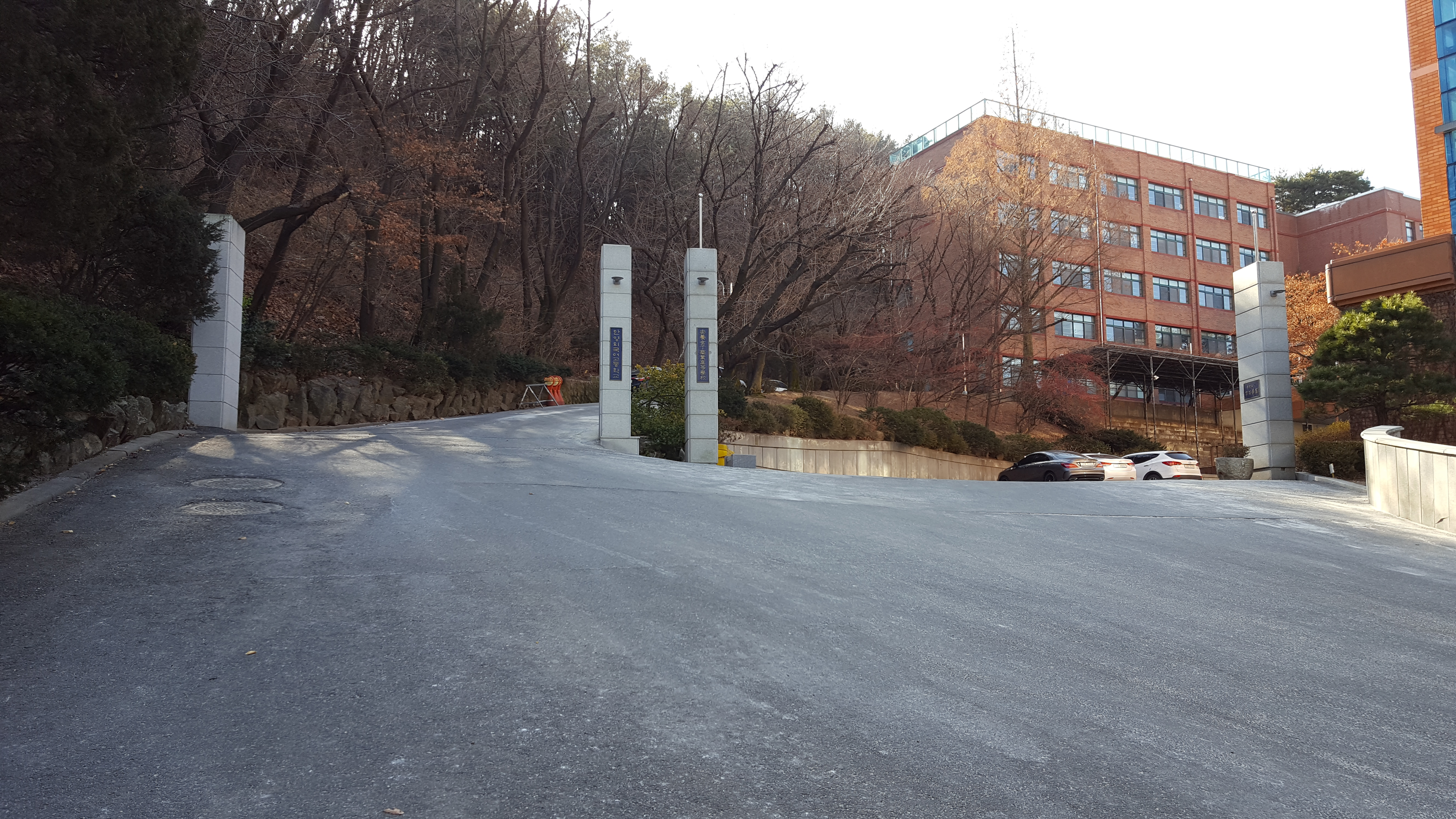

Information
- Type: Private
- Established: March 2nd, 1993
- Teaching staff: 69
- Gender: Coeducational
- Affiliation: 운석학원
- Website: www.anyang-fl.hs.kr

Anyang Foreign Language High School (Korean: 안양외국어고등학교; Hanja: 安養外國語高等學校) is a private, foreign language high school in South Korea. The school is located in Anyang Country of the Gyeonggi Province. It is designed for the study of English, Chinese, and Japanese. The school includes the Department of English, the Department of Chinese, and the Department of Japanese.

The school differs from conventional Korean schools in several ways. For example, it doesn't use bells to signal the beginning or end of classes, emphasising greater autonomy for both teachers and students. Students also participate in study groups, where they hold debates and discussions on topics of interest. The school also uses a computerised course registration system for special courses, allowing students to register for courses from home similarly to many universities.

== School activities ==
=== Cultural exchange ===
The school has many sistership schools abroad, asking which are Delhi Public School in India, Waseda University Honjo Senior High School in Japan, Hanoi - Amsterdam High School in Vietnam. Students visit sister schools more than once a year. Students from sistership schools experience homestays with A.F.L.H.S. students. Every year, students go abroad for a week long trip to Japan, China, and Singapore. Students also have cultural exchanges with undergraduate students of Waseda University, Tokyo, and the National University of Singapore.

=== Club activities ===
Over 50 clubs for extra activities exist in the school, including WOW (football club), EDIT (English Journal), UNESCO (volunteer work), Show Time (English Musical), and Silchunsarang (sign language). A student can join more than one club.

=== Teacher evaluation system ===
At the end of a semester, students evaluate their homeroom and subject teachers, and may provide feedback regarding school policies.

== See also ==
- Gwacheon Foreign Language High School
