= Yangchon station =

Station of the Seoul Metropolitan Subway

G100 양촌 Yangchon
- Station nameplate

Korean name
- Hangul: 양촌역
- Hanja: 陽村驛
- RR: Yangchon-yeok
- MR: Yangch'on-yŏk

General information
- Location: 290 Yuhyeon-ri, Yangchon-eup, Gimpo, Gyeonggi-do
- Coordinates: 37°38′29.9″N 126°36′52.9″E
- Operator: GIMPO Goldline Co., Ltd.
- Line: Gimpo Goldline
- Platforms: 2
- Tracks: 2

Construction
- Structure type: Aboveground

History
- Opened: September 28, 2019
Location

Yangchon Station is a station on the Gimpo Goldline. It opened on September 28, 2019.

Platform

Preceding station	Seoul Metropolitan Subway	Following station
Gurae towards Gimpo International Airport	Gimpo Goldline	Terminus
