= Gimpo =

City in Gyeonggi, South Korea

Coordinates: 37°42′0″N 126°36′0″E

- Municipal City
- Panoramic view of Gimpo

- Flag Emblem of Gimpo

- Location in South Korea
- Country: South Korea
- Region: Gyeonggi Province (Sudogwon)
- Administrative divisions: 3 eup, 3 myeon, 7 dong

Area
  - Total: 276.6 km^{2} (106.8 sq mi)

Population (September 2024)
  - Total: 486,258
  - Density: 1,546.55/km^{2} (4,005.5/sq mi)
  - Dialect: Seoul

Korean name
- Hangul: 김포시
- Hanja: 金浦市
- RR: Gimpo-si
- MR: Kimp'o-si

Gimpo (Korean: 김포; Korean pronunciation: [kim.pʰo]) is a city in Gyeonggi Province, South Korea. It borders Incheon, with which it shares the South Korean side of the Han River estuary, as well as Seoul and the lesser cities of Paju and Goyang. North Korea is across the Han River. The current mayor is Jeong Hayoung. The city's population of more than 300,000 is made up of more than 71,000 households.

Gimpo International Airport (formerly Kimpo International Airport) used to be located inside the city, but is now part of Seoul. Tertiary educational institutions located in the city include Kimpo College and Joong-ang Seungga University. The city has 27 elementary schools, 12 middle schools, and 8 high schools, including Gimpo Foreign Language High School. Three elementary schools, two middle schools, and two high schools are located in the area of Tongjin.

== Modern history ==
In 1914, Yangcheon County and Gimpo County were merged. Yangcheon County was separated into two towns (Yangdong and Yangseo).

Kimpo Airfield was constructed in 1939 during the Japanese Imperial period for use by the Imperial Japanese Army. The airfield was a key asset during the Korean War, changing hands three times before being recaptured and held by UN forces in February 1951 for the duration of the war. Designated K-14 by the United States Air Force, it hosted several U.S. fighter, bomber, and reconnaissance units, notably F-86 Sabre which would engage in air combat in MiG Alley in the northwestern part of North Korea.

In 1958, the government decreed that the airfield would serve all commercial flights into Seoul, a role until then filled by Yeouido Airport. After the completion of the terminal at Gimpo, Yeouido was demolished.

In 1963, Yangdong and Yangseo towns were incorporated into Yeongdeungpo District, which includes Gimpo International Airport. In 1973, Gyeyang and Ojeong towns of Bucheon were transferred to Gimpo. In 1989, parts of Gyeyang town were ceded to Incheon, giving Incheon a border with southwestern Seoul. The Geomdan area was transferred to Incheon in 1995.

In 1998, Gimpo was promoted to a city (si). A major new development, the Gimpo Han River New Town, was announced in 2003, significantly increasing the population of the city since its construction. A two-car light rail system, the Gimpo Goldline, opened in 2019 to improve transportation to the New Town and to encourage population growth. The line operates between Yangchon station and Gimpo International Airport station, where transfers are available to AREX, Korail, and Seoul Metropolitan Subway services.

== Climate ==
Gimpo has a monsoon-influenced humid continental climate (Köppen: Dwa) with cold, dry winters and hot, rainy summers.

Climate data for Gimpo (2004–2020 normals)
Month	Jan	Feb	Mar	Apr	May	Jun	Jul	Aug	Sep	Oct	Nov	Dec	Year
Mean daily maximum °C (°F)	1.3 (34.3)	4.6 (40.3)	10.5 (50.9)	16.8 (62.2)	22.8 (73.0)	27.0 (80.6)	28.6 (83.5)	30.0 (86.0)	25.8 (78.4)	19.9 (67.8)	11.5 (52.7)	3.0 (37.4)	16.8 (62.2)
Daily mean °C (°F)	−3.5 (25.7)	−0.5 (31.1)	5.1 (41.2)	11.2 (52.2)	17.2 (63.0)	21.9 (71.4)	24.7 (76.5)	25.7 (78.3)	20.8 (69.4)	14.2 (57.6)	6.8 (44.2)	−1.3 (29.7)	11.9 (53.4)
Mean daily minimum °C (°F)	−7.8 (18.0)	−5.1 (22.8)	0.3 (32.5)	6.3 (43.3)	12.5 (54.5)	17.9 (64.2)	21.8 (71.2)	22.4 (72.3)	16.8 (62.2)	9.5 (49.1)	2.3 (36.1)	−5.5 (22.1)	7.6 (45.7)
Average precipitation mm (inches)	7.4 (0.29)	21.7 (0.85)	30.5 (1.20)	60.1 (2.37)	90.3 (3.56)	100.1 (3.94)	362.3 (14.26)	245.0 (9.65)	139.1 (5.48)	39.0 (1.54)	47.6 (1.87)	17.4 (0.69)	1,160.5 (45.69)
Average precipitation days (≥ 0.1 mm)	2.5	2.7	4.5	7.1	6.1	7.2	13.2	10.5	7.0	4.5	6.8	4.4	76.5
Source: Korea Meteorological Administration

== Statistics ==
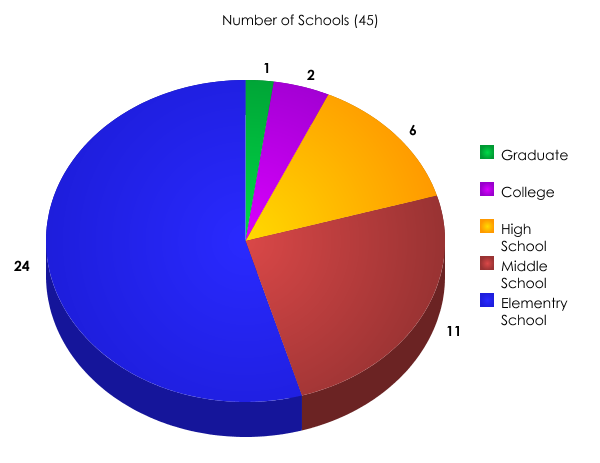

== Industry ==
=== Regional gross domestic product ===
Gimpo's gross domestic product in 2012 was 16.98 trillion won, accounting for 2.2% of the total in Gyeonggi Province. Among them, agriculture, forestry, and fisheries (primary industry) accounted for 248.5 billion won. In contrast, mining and manufacturing (second industry) accounted for 63.1% of the total, while commercial and service industries account for 35.3%, or 5.6869 trillion won. In the second industrial sector, wholesale and retail businesses (5.4%), construction (4.7%), real estate and rental businesses (3.7%), and electricity, gas, steam, and water projects (3.0%) accounted for a large portion, as the new Gimpo Han River is built.

=== Status of employees ===
In 2014, the Gimpo industry's total number stood at 129,440, accounting for 2.9% of the total number of workers in Gyeonggi Province. Among them, agriculture and forestry (primary industry) account for 93 people. In contrast, mining and manufacturing (second industry) account for 48.6% of 62,946, while commercial and service industries (third industry) account for 51.3% with 66,401. The secondary industry is higher than the overall proportion of Gyeonggi Province (27.1%), and the tertiary industry is lower than the overall proportion of Gyeonggi Province (72.9%). In the third industrial sector, wholesale and retail (12.1%), lodging and restaurant (7.7%), education and services (6.2%), and health and social welfare (5.2%).

=== Resident population and floating population ===
As of 2010, Gimpo's city had 215,050 residents and 227,159 weekly population, with the weekly population index high at 106. The number of people flowing in from commuting to work is 45,757. The number of people leaving from school is 31,213, and 2,687 and 5,122 more people flowing from school, a common phenomenon in the outskirts of the Seoul metropolitan area where many industrial facilities have been relocated.

== Tourist spots ==
- Munsu Fortress
- Jangneung
- Deokpojin
- Aegi Peak
- Daemyeong Port
- DMZ Peace Trail
- Czong Institute for Contemporary Art (CICA Museum)

== Sister cities ==
- Glendale, California, United States
- Hampyeong, South Jeolla Province, South Korea
- Xinmin, Liaoning, China
- Heze, Shandong, China
- Bacong, Negros Oriental, Philippines

== See also ==
- List of cities in South Korea
- Geography of South Korea
- Seoul National Capital Area
- Gimpo International Airport
- Gimpo Peninsula
