= Gimpo International Airport station =

Train station in Seoul, South Korea

Coordinates: 37°33′45″N 126°48′3″E

김포공항; Gimpo Int'l Airport
김포공항; Gimpo Int'l Airport
김포공항; Gimpo Int'l Airport
김포공항; Gimpo Int'l Airport
G109
김포공항
Gimpo Int'l Airport
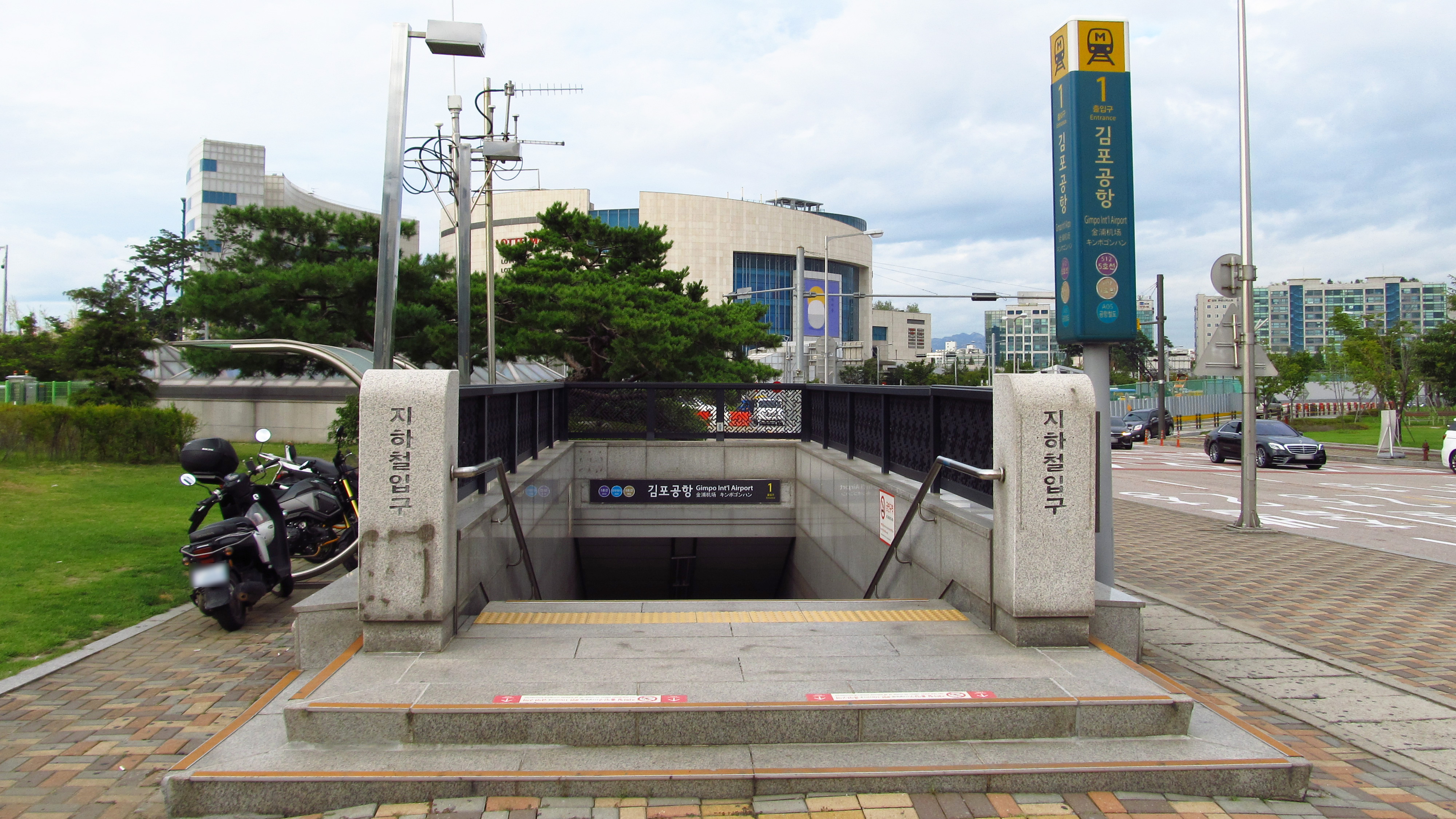
- Gimpo International Airport station entrance No. 1

Korean name
- Hangul: 김포공항역
- Hanja: 金浦空港驛
- RR: Gimpo gonghang-yeok
- MR: Kimp'o konghang-yŏk

General information
- Location: Haneulgil Jiha 77, 886 Banghwa-dong, Gangseo-gu, Seoul
- Operator: Seoul Metro; Airport Railroad Co., Ltd.; Seoul Metro Line 9 Corporation; GIMPO Goldline Co., Ltd.; Korail
- Lines: Line 5 Line 9 AREX; Gimpo Goldline; Seohae Line
- Platforms: 9
- Tracks: 11

Construction
- Structure type: Underground

Key dates
- March 20, 1996: Line 5 opened
- March 23, 2007: AREX opened
- July 24, 2009: Line 9 opened
- September 28, 2019: Gimpo Goldline opened
- July 1, 2023: Seohae Line opened
Services
Preceding station	Seoul Metropolitan Subway	Following station
Gaehwasan towards Banghwa	Line 5	Songjeong towards Hanam Geomdansan or Macheon
Gaehwa Terminus	Line 9	Airport Market towards VHS Medical Center
Terminus	Line 9 Express	Magongnaru towards VHS Medical Center
Magongnaru towards Seoul Station	AREX	Gyeyang towards Incheon International Airport Terminal 2
Terminus	Gimpo Goldline	Gochon towards Yangchon
Neunggok towards Ilsan	Seohae Line	Wonjong towards Wonsi
Location

Gimpo International Airport Station is a subway, railway and light rail station on Seoul Subway Line 5, Line 9, AREX, the Gimpo Goldline and the Seohae Line. True to its name, it serves the nearby Gimpo Airport, the hub of domestic flights in the Seoul metropolitan area as well as a limited number of regional international flights to and from China, Japan, and Taiwan. Upon its opening in 1996, it became the first railway station in the Korean Peninsula to directly serve an airport.

== Gallery ==
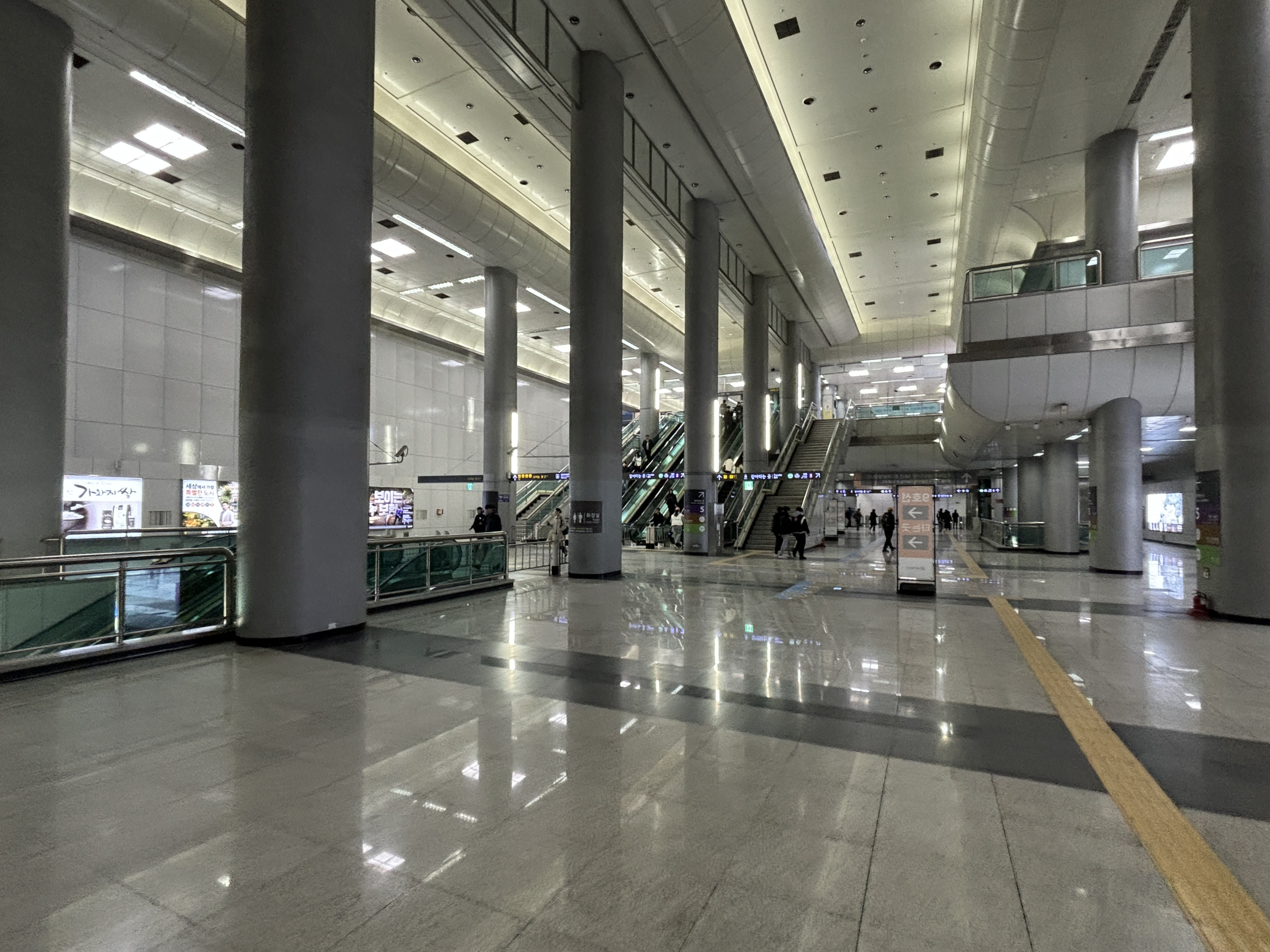
Main concourse

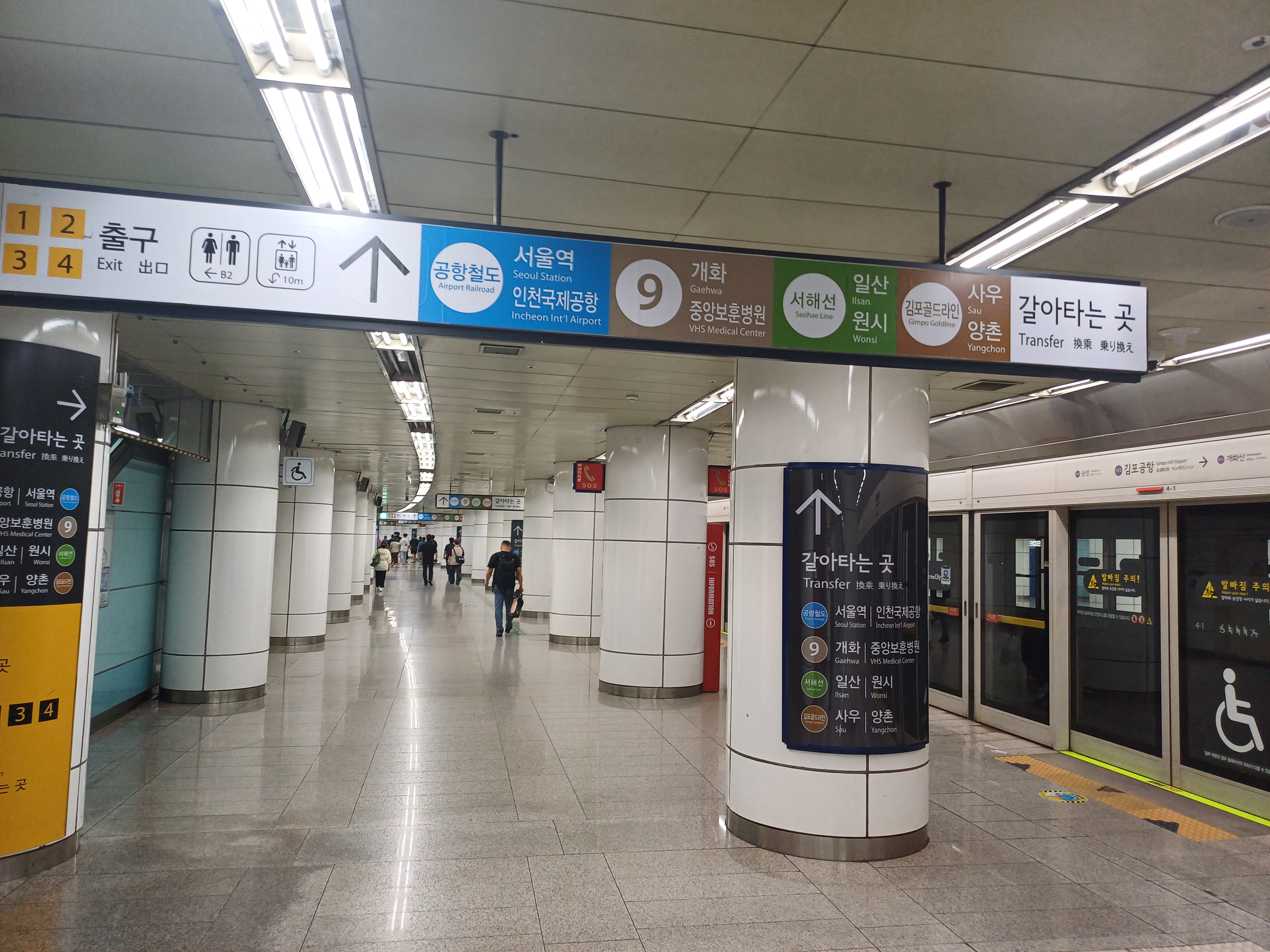
Line 5 platform

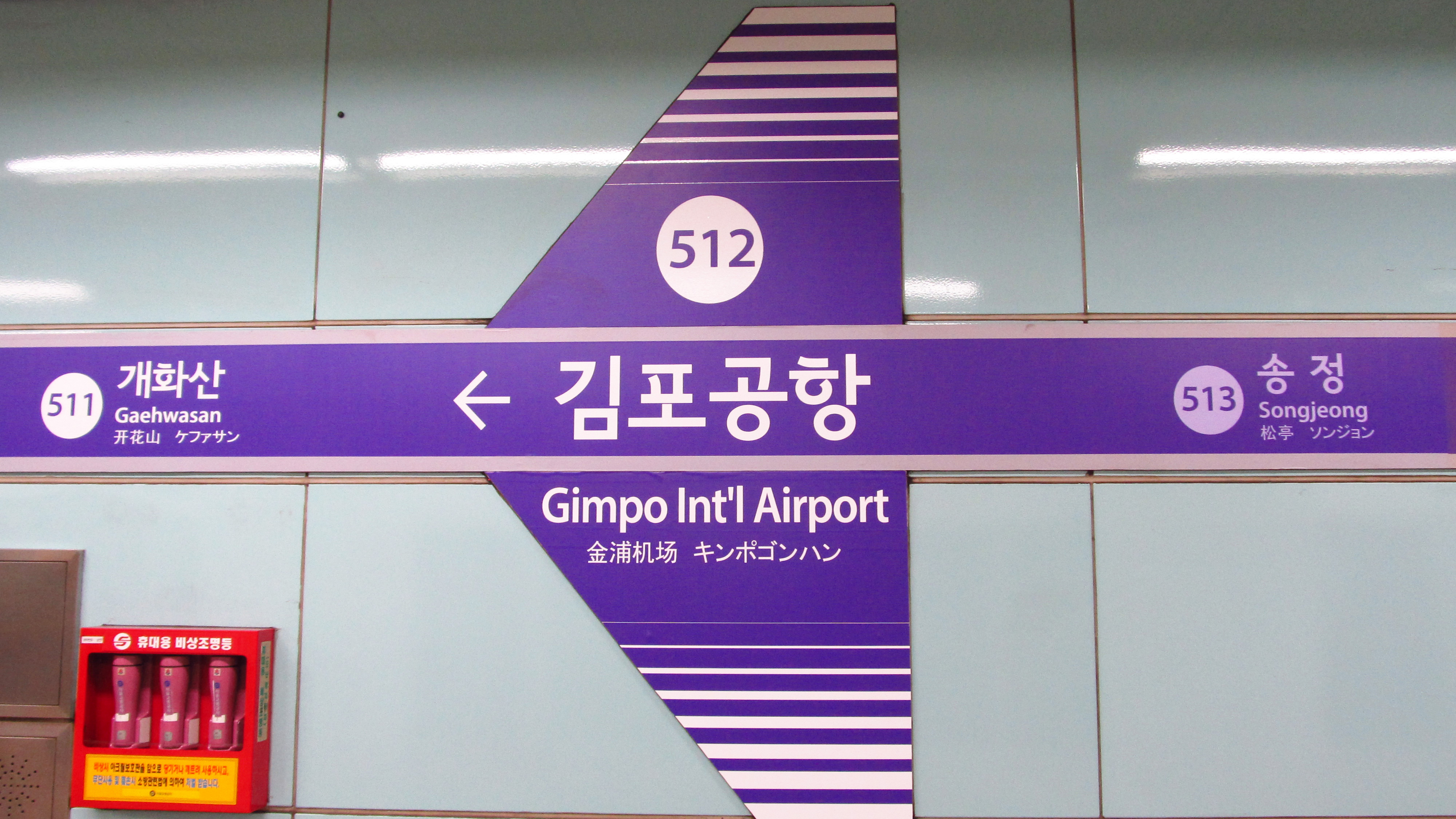
Line 5 station nameplate

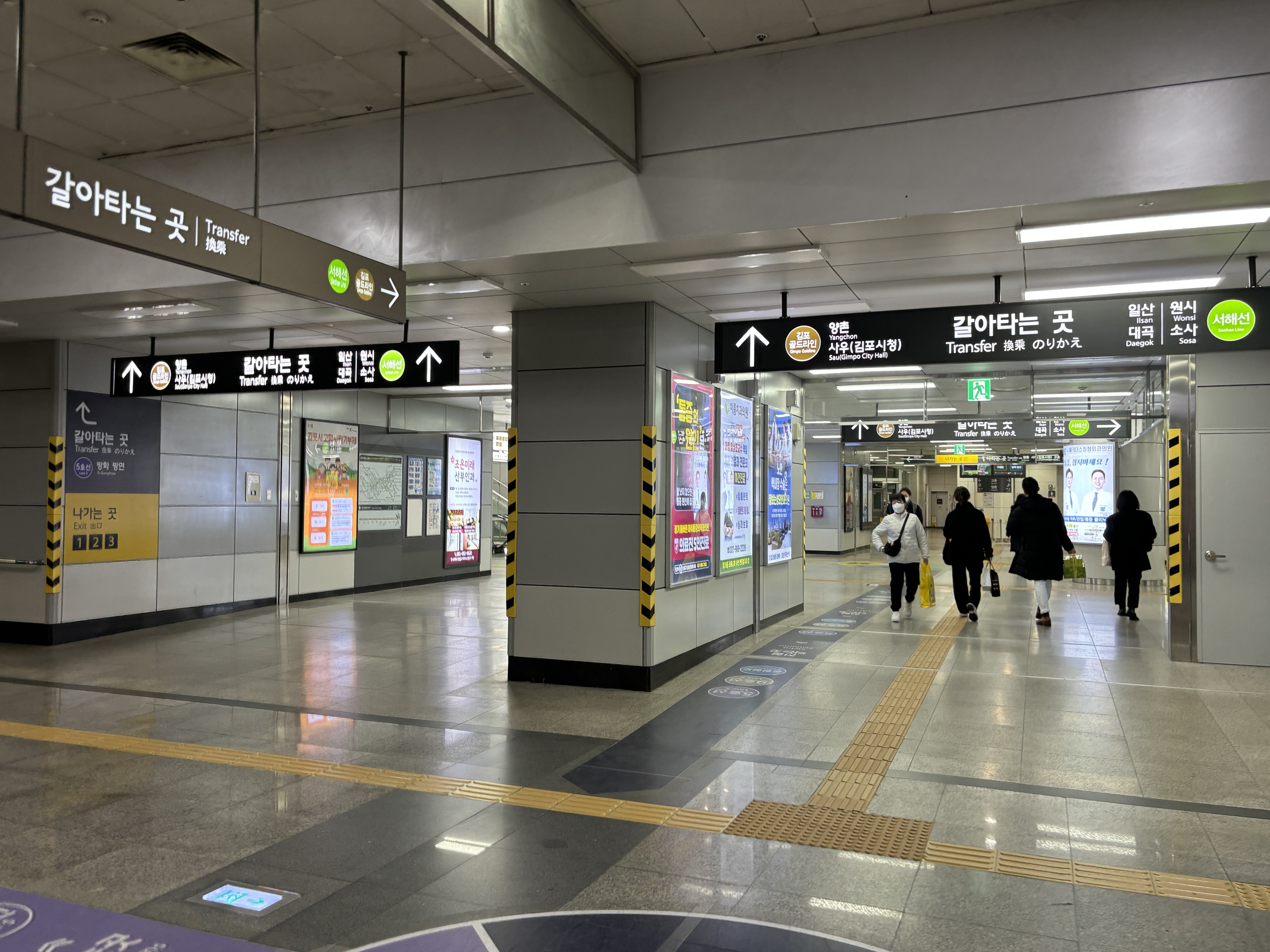
Entrance to Gimpo Goldline and Seohae Line structure

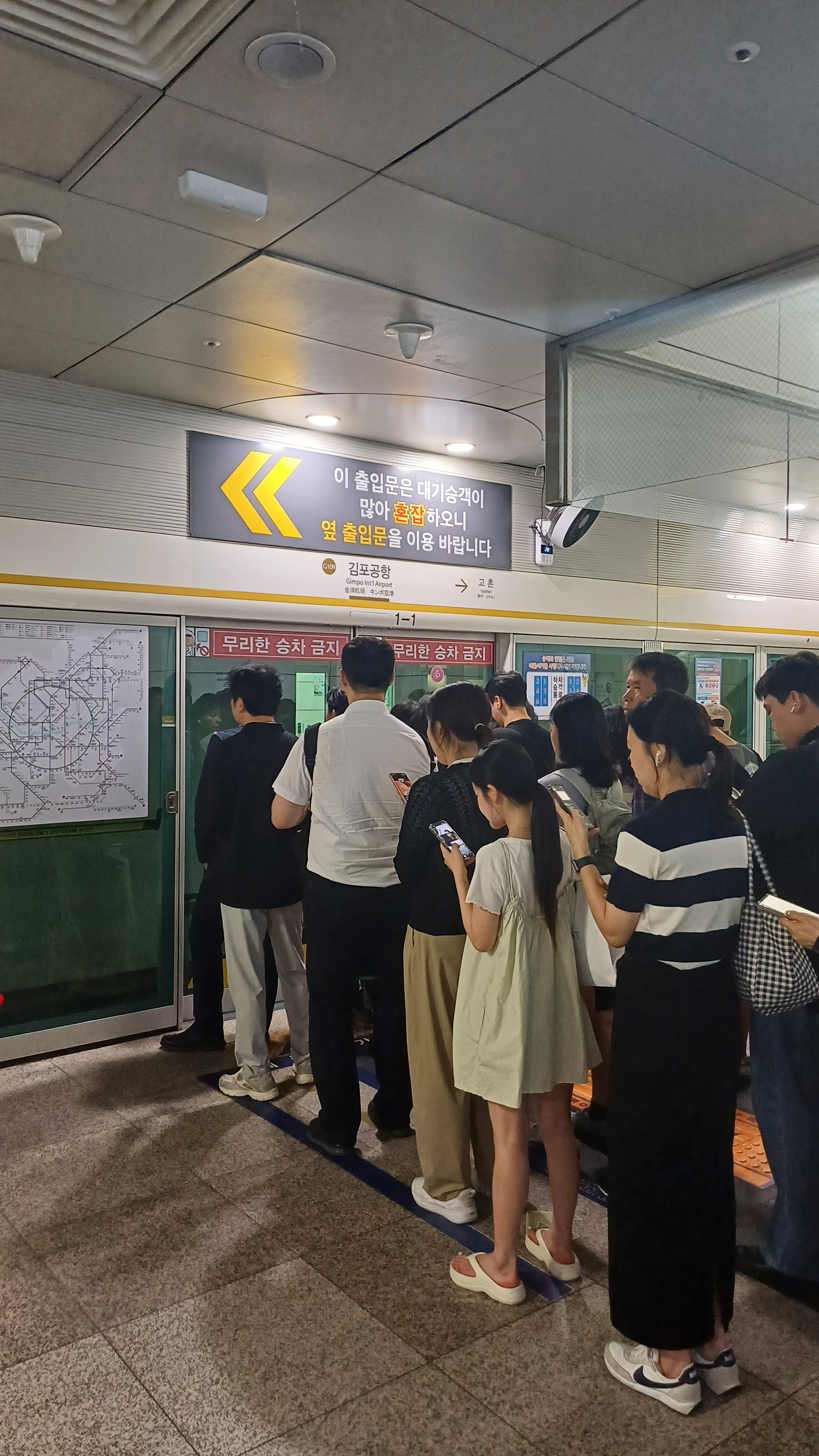
Gimpo Goldline platform

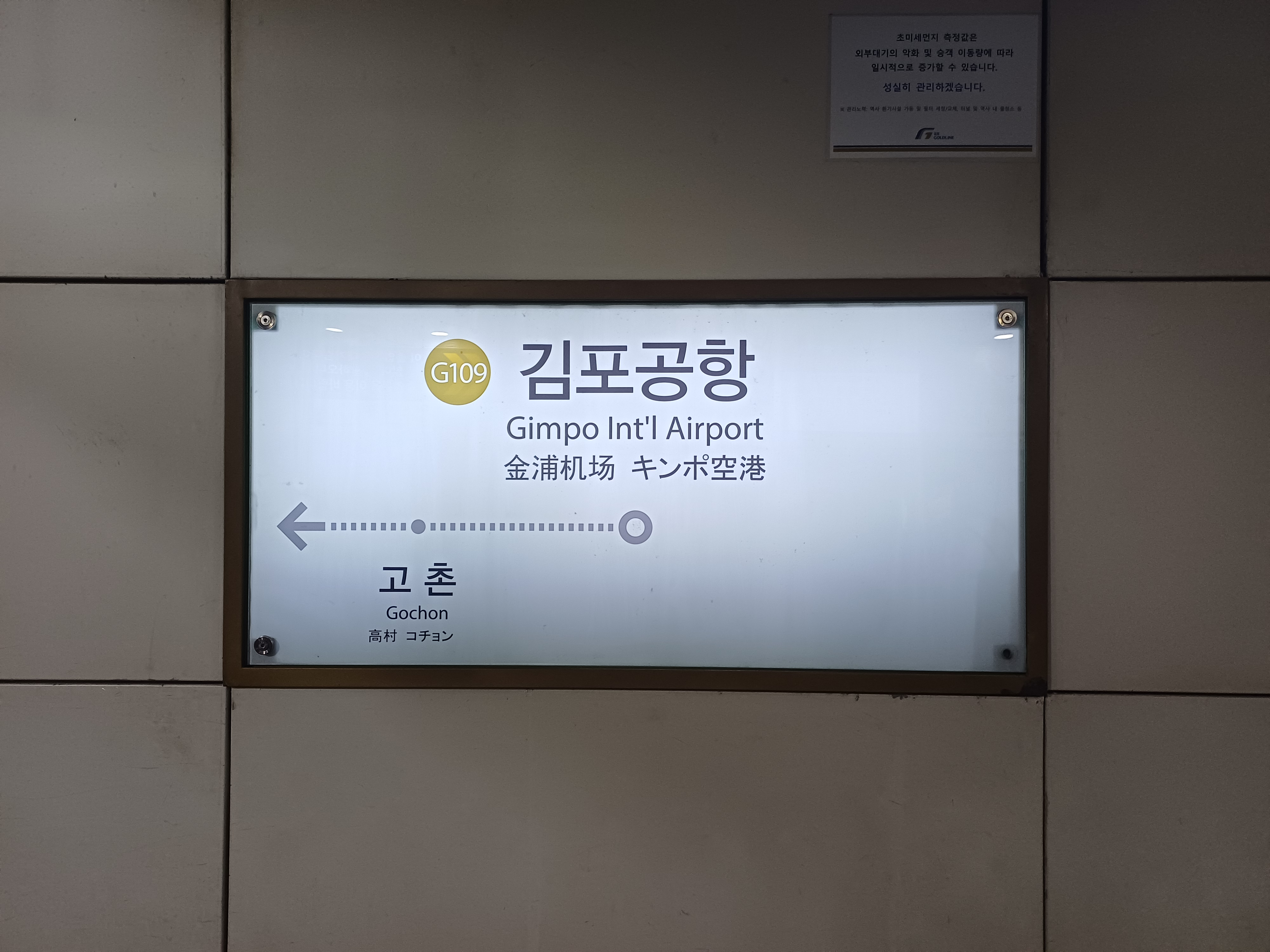
Gimpo Goldline station nameplate

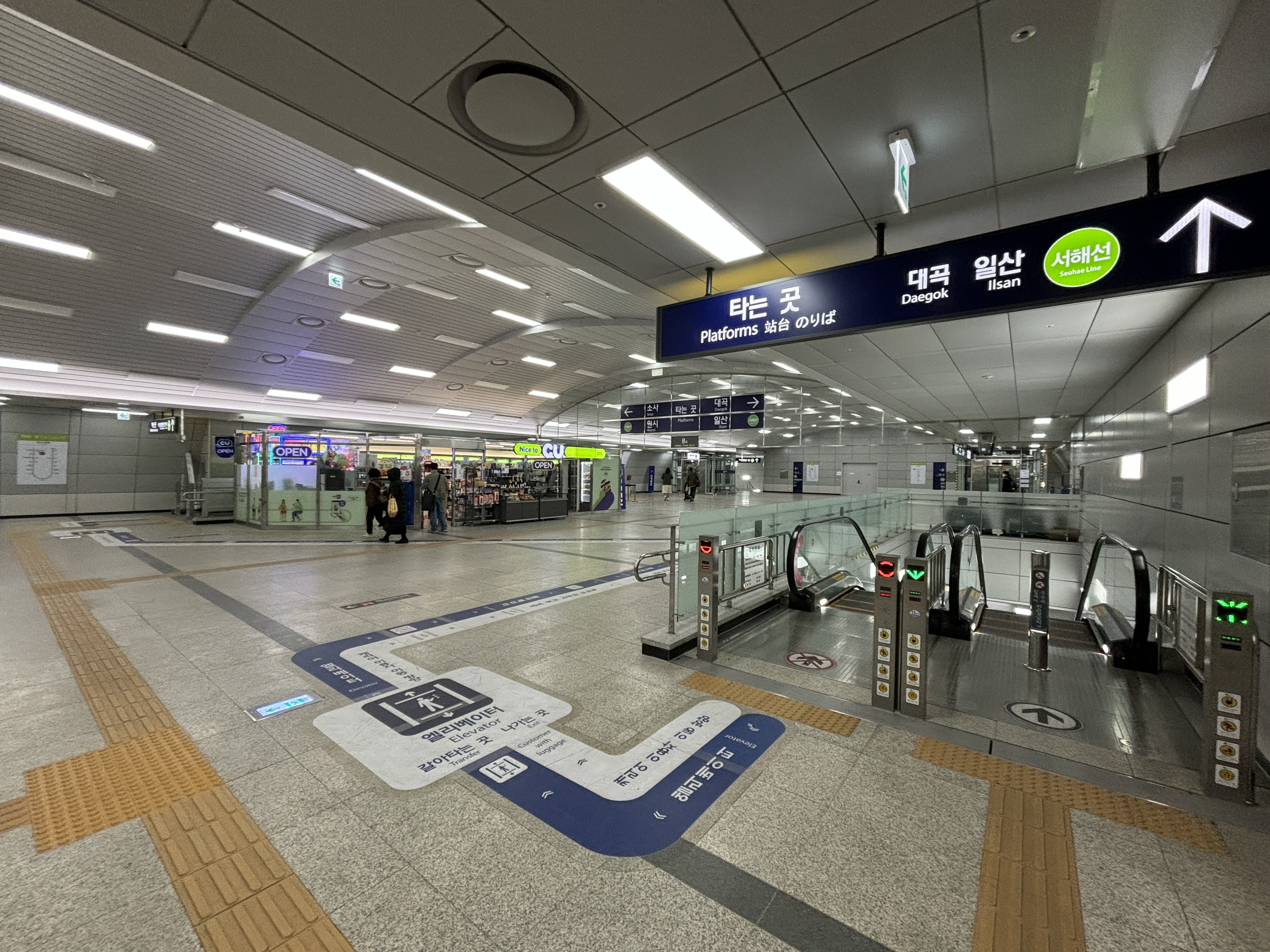
Concourse of Seohae Line

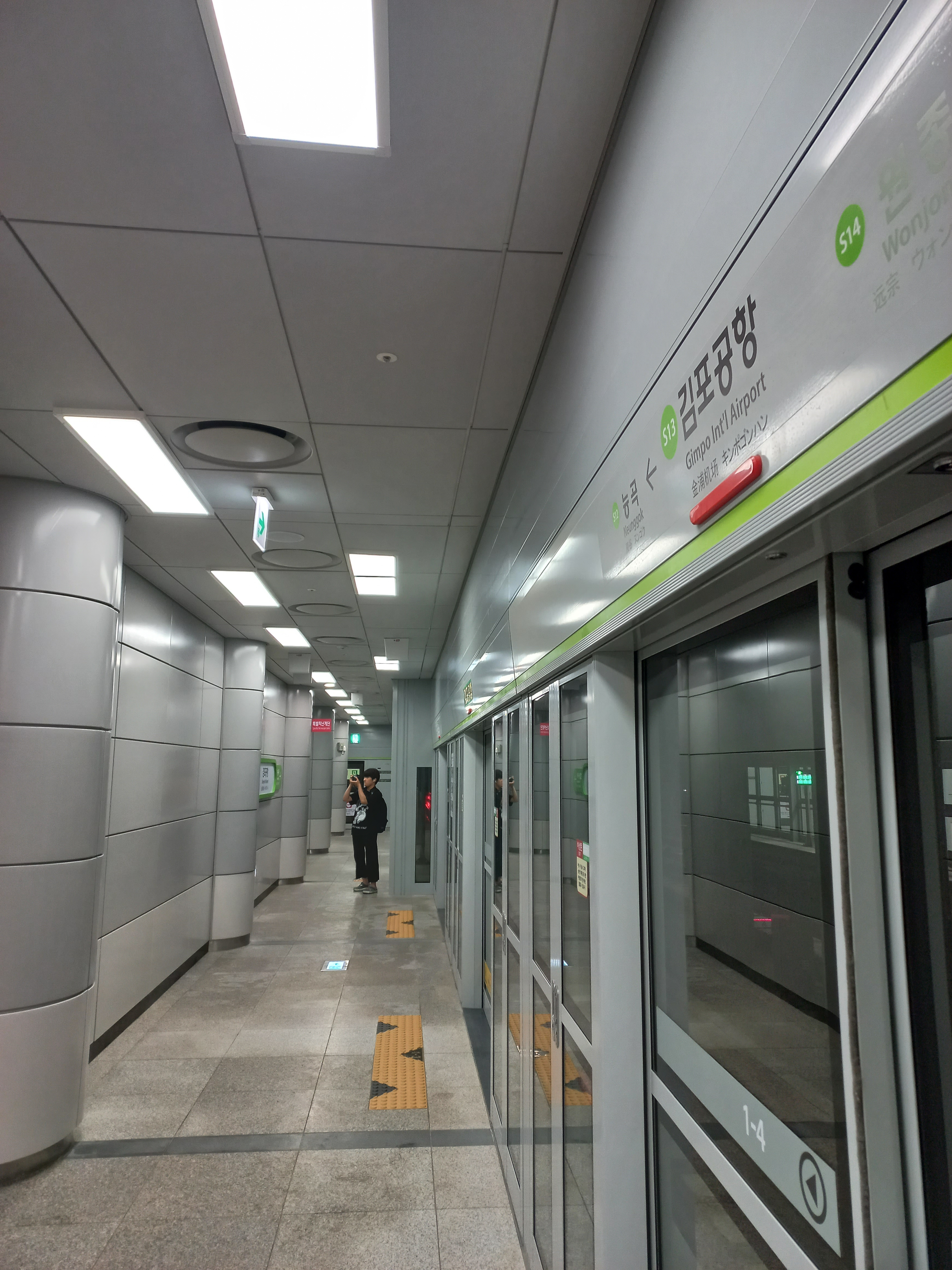
Platform of Seohae Line

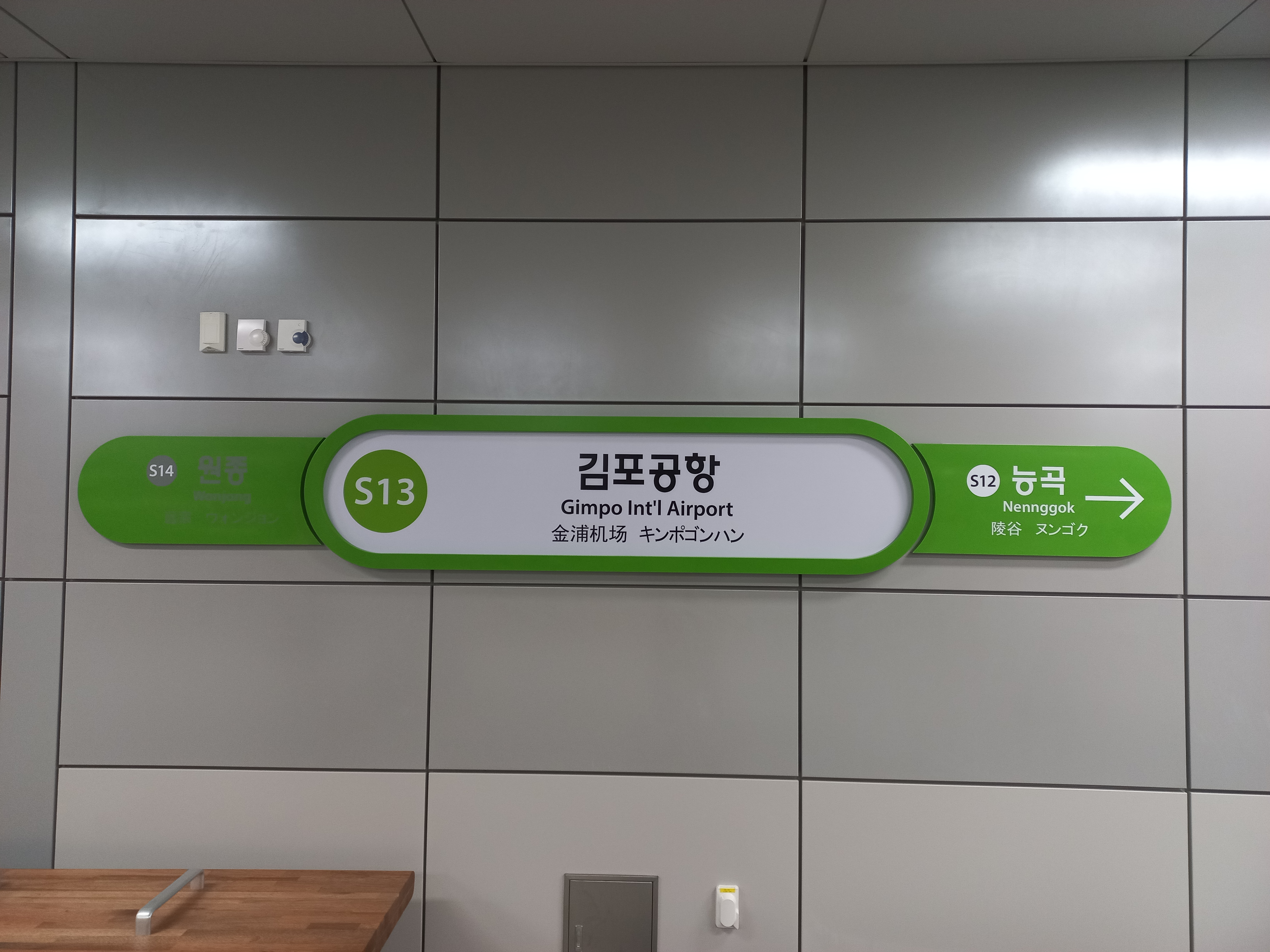
Seohae Line station nameplate

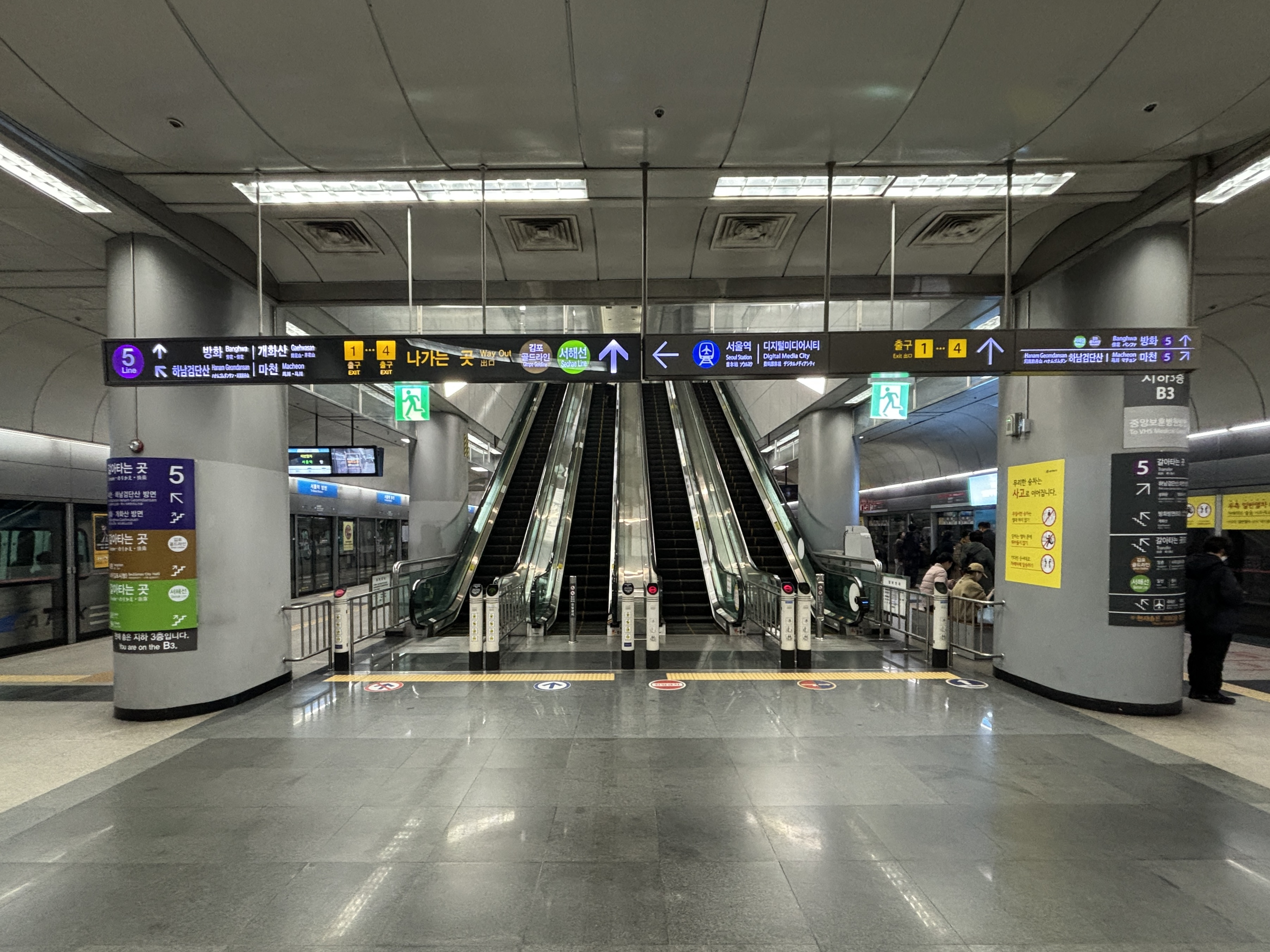
Line 9 and AREX upper platforms

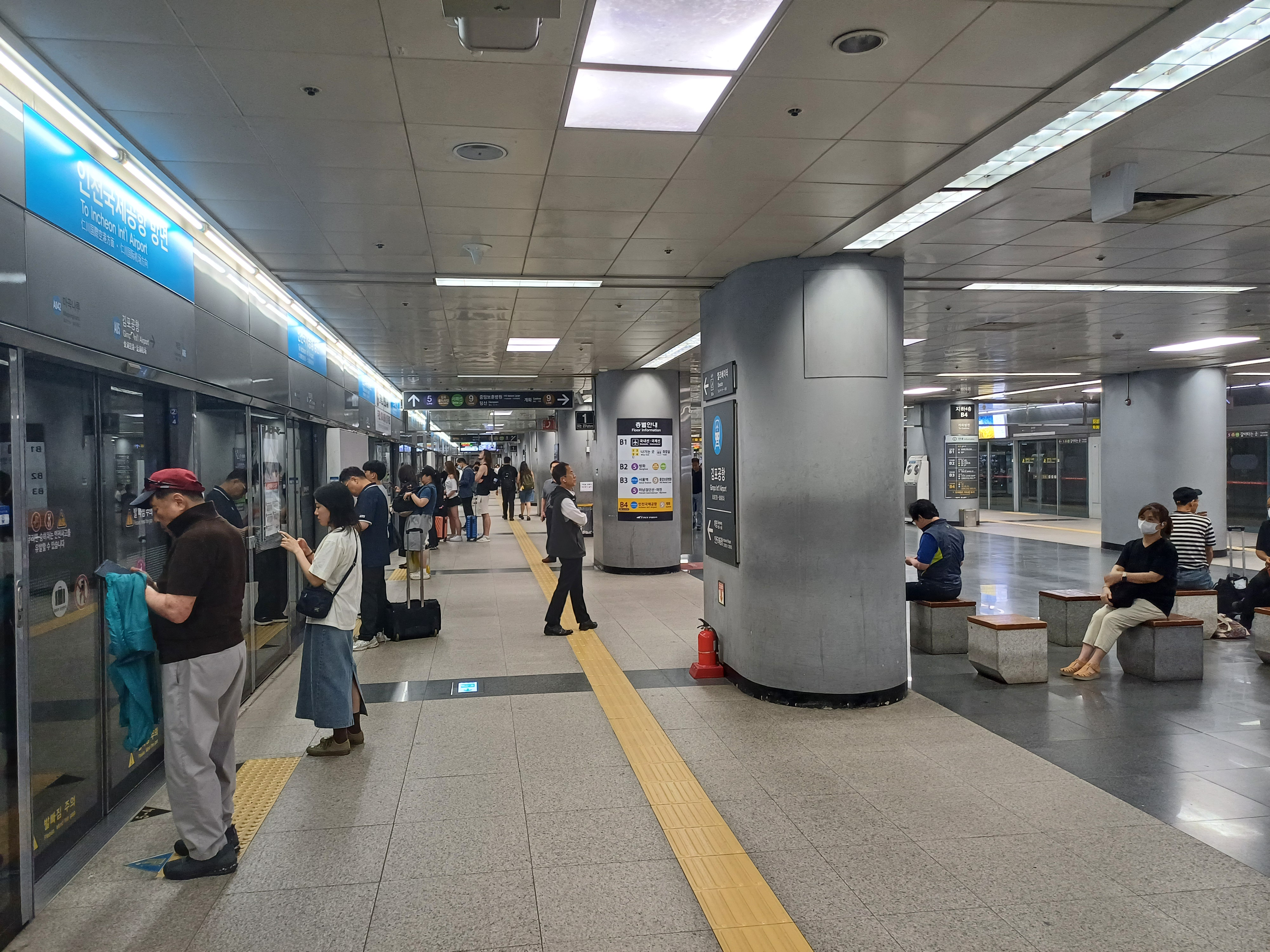
Line 9 and AREX lower platforms

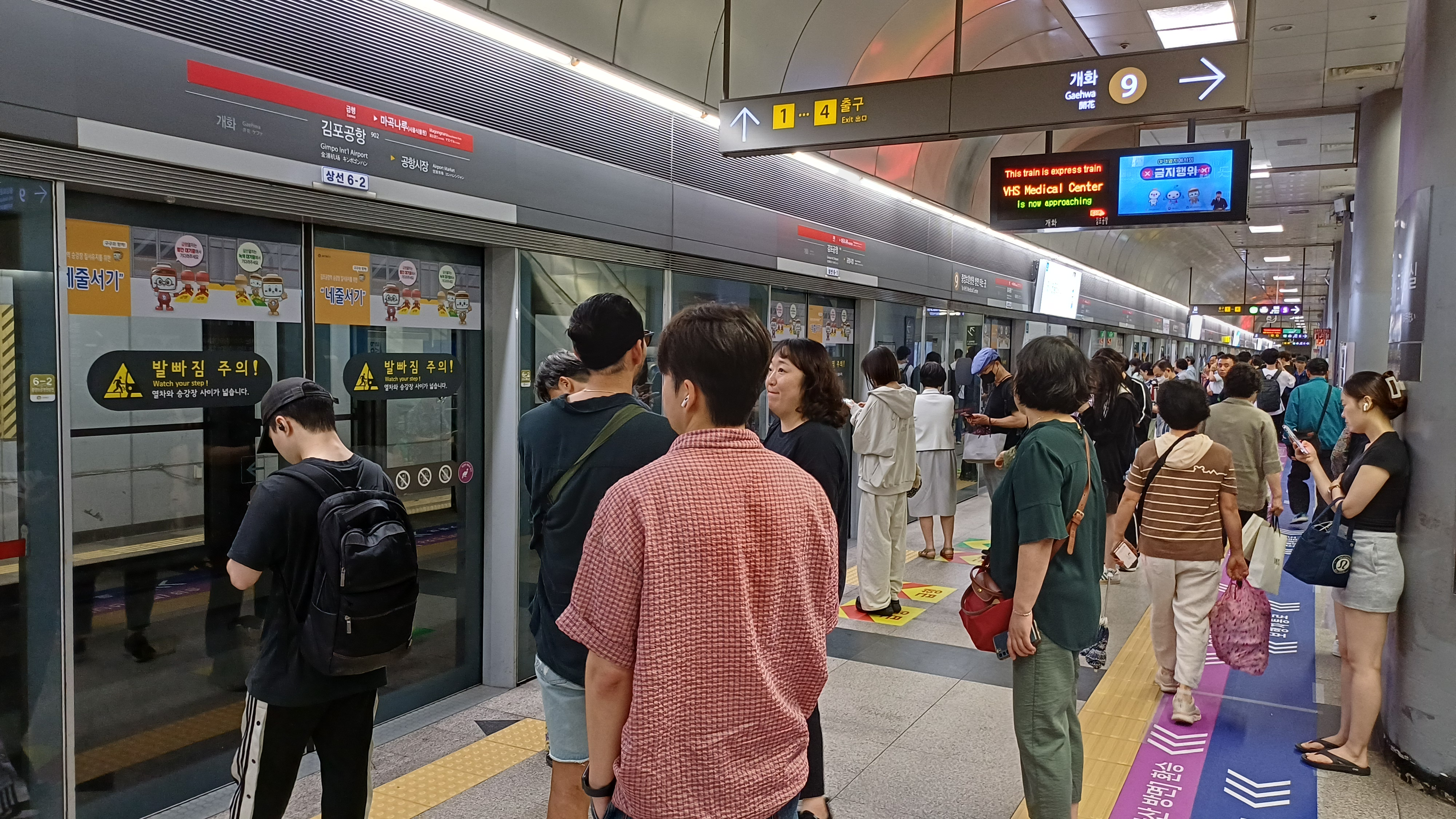
Line 9 platform (Express)

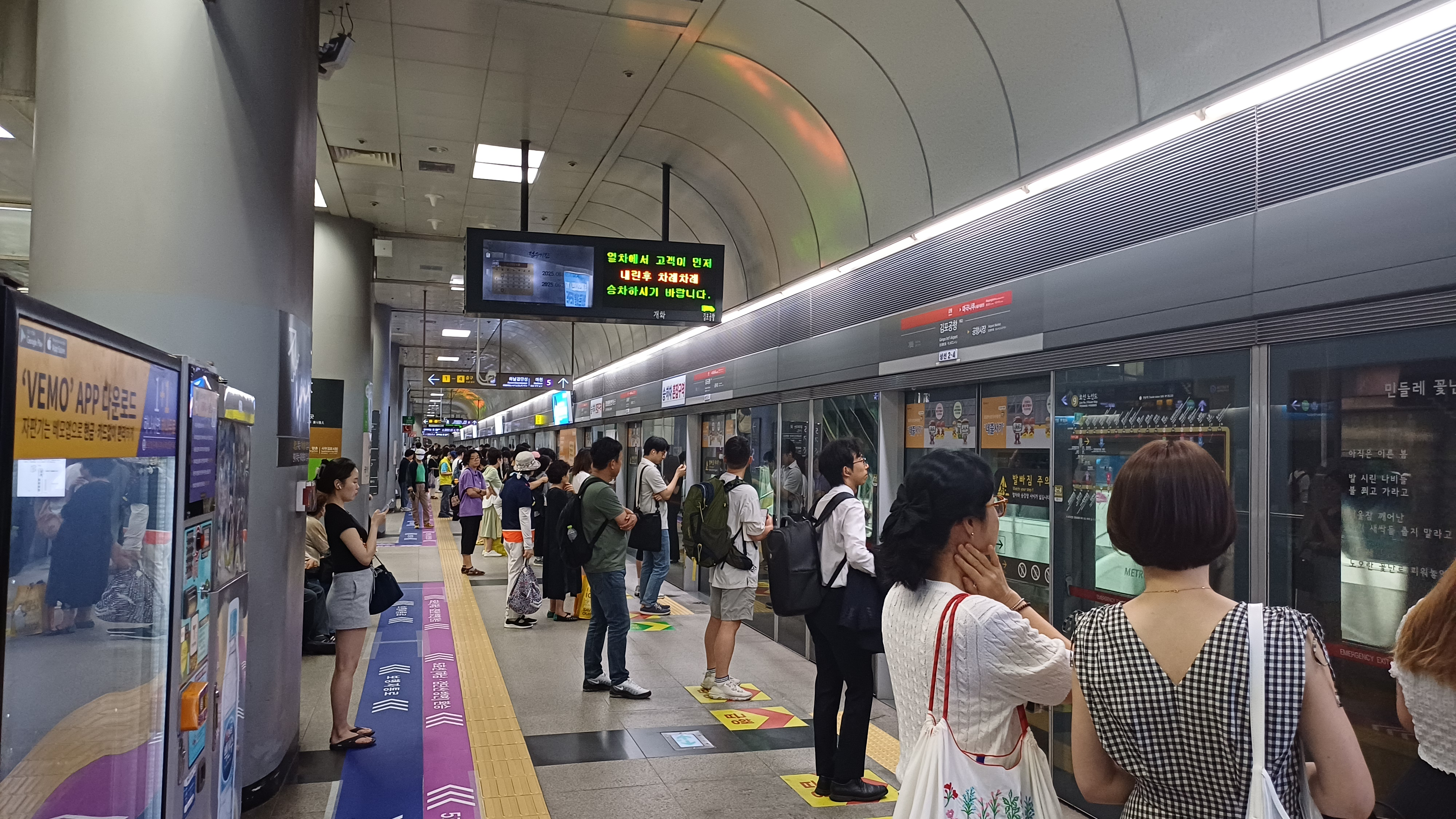
Line 9 platform

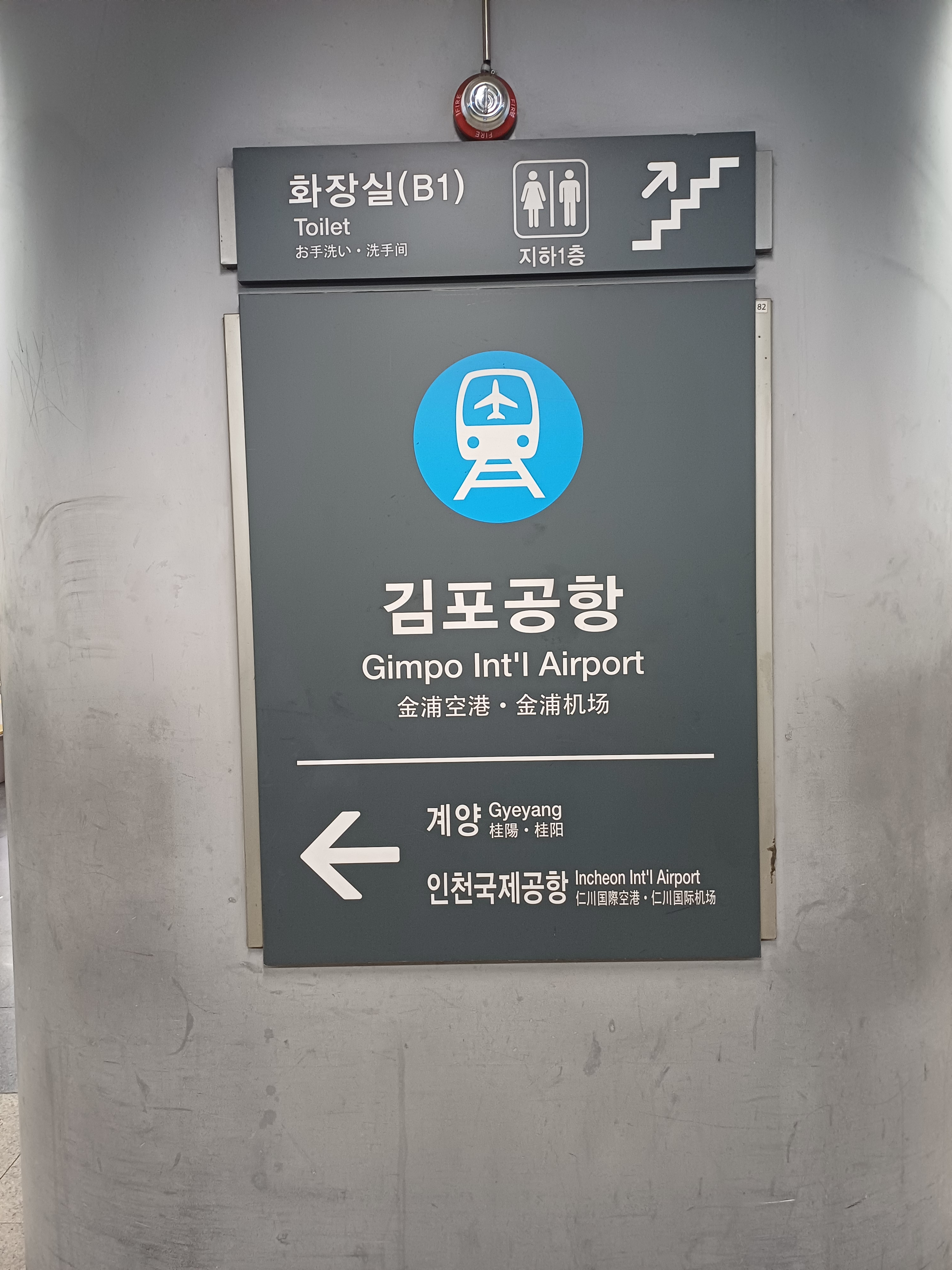
AREX station nameplate

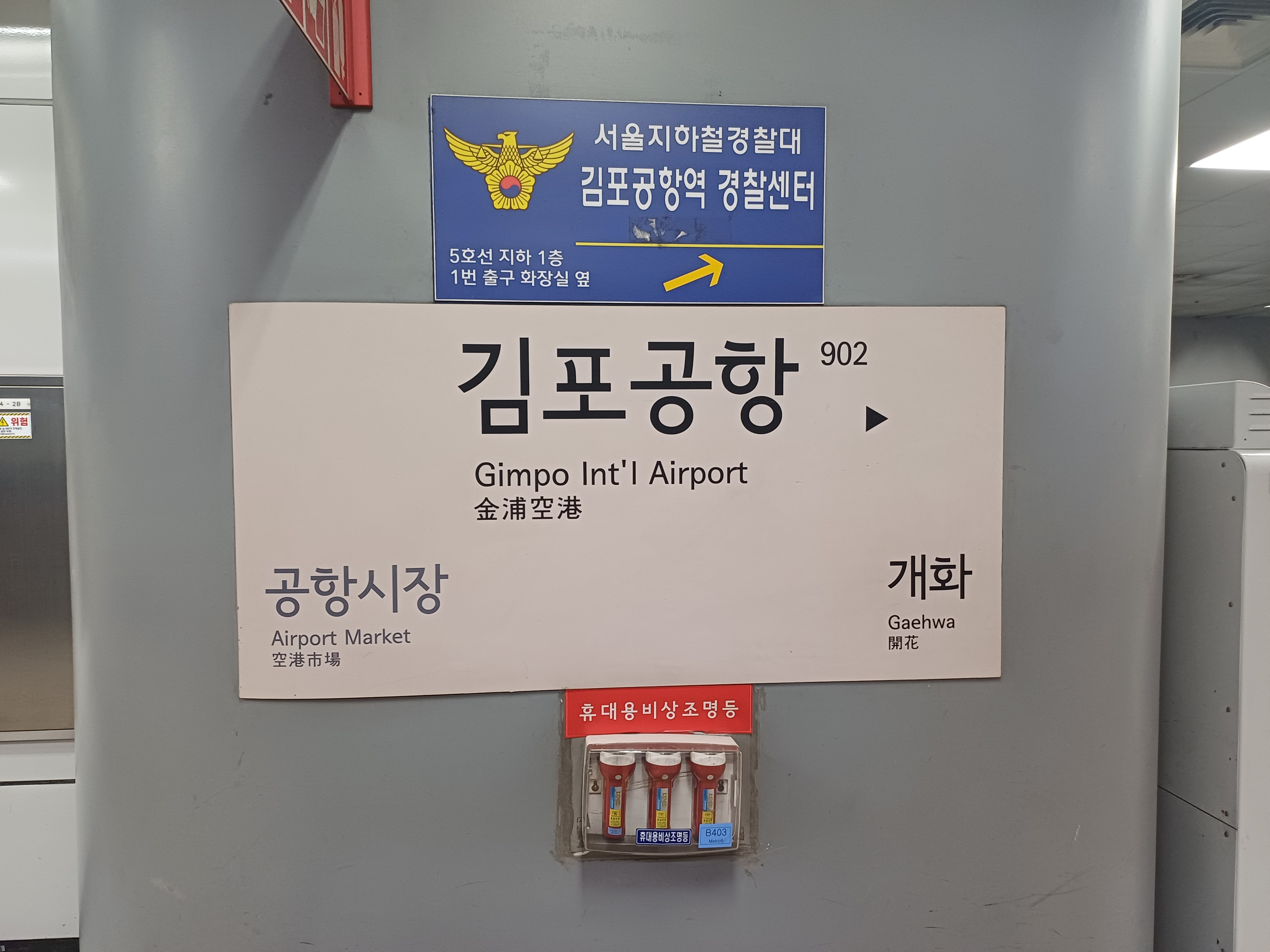
Line 9 station nameplate

( for Ilsan)

== Station layout ==
G		Street Level	Exits
L1	Concourse	Lobby	Customer Service, Shops, Vending machines, ATMs
L3
L3	Line 5 Platforms	Side platform, doors open on the right
L3	Line 5 Platforms	Westbound	← Line 5 toward Banghwa (Gaehwasan)
L3	Line 5 Platforms	Eastbound	Line 5 toward Hanam Geomdansan or Macheon (Songjeong) →
L3	Line 5 Platforms	Side platform, doors open on the right
L3	Line 9 & AREX Upper Platforms	Eastbound	AREX toward Seoul(Magongnaru) →
L3	Line 9 & AREX Upper Platforms	Island platform, doors open on the left and right
L3	Line 9 & AREX Upper Platforms	Eastbound	Line 9 toward VHS Medical Center (Airport Market) →
L4	Line 9 & AREX Lower Platforms	Westbound	← AREXtoward Incheon International Airport Terminal 2 (Gyeyang)
L4	Line 9 & AREX Lower Platforms	Island platform, doors open on the left and right
L4	Line 9 & AREX Lower Platforms	Westbound	← Line 9 toward Gaehwa (Terminus)
L4	Gimpo Goldline; Platforms	Side platform, doors open on the right
L4	Gimpo Goldline; Platforms	Westbound	← Gimpo Goldline toward Yangchon (Gochon)
L4	Gimpo Goldline; Platforms	Eastbound	Gimpo Goldline Alighting Passengers Only →
L4	Gimpo Goldline; Platforms	Side platform, doors open on the right
L5
L5	Seohae Line; Platforms	Side platform, doors open on the right
L5	Seohae Line; Platforms	Northbound	← Seohae toward Daegok (Neunggok)
L5	Seohae Line; Platforms	Southbound	Seohae toward Wonsi (Wonjong) →
L5	Seohae Line; Platforms	Side platform, doors open on the right

== Vicinity ==
- Exit 1 : Gimpo Airport Domestic Terminal
- Exit 2 : Gimpo Airport International Terminal
