= Public bicycle rental service in South Korea =

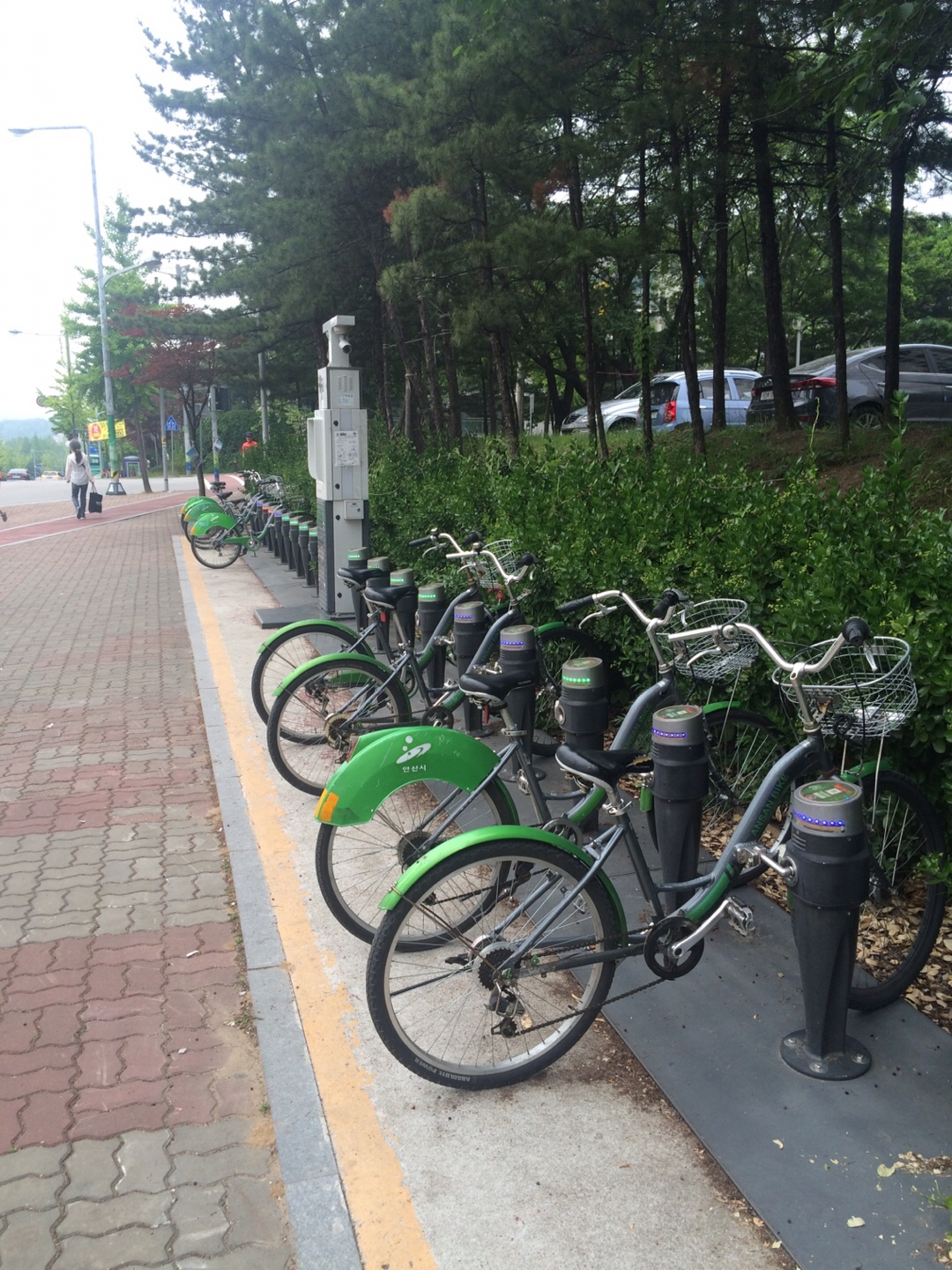
Public bicycle rental service in Ansan

Public bicycle rental services are available in several cities across South Korea, each managed by their respective city governments. Bicycles can be used and paid for through an existing transportation card system or by mobile phone.

== Locations ==
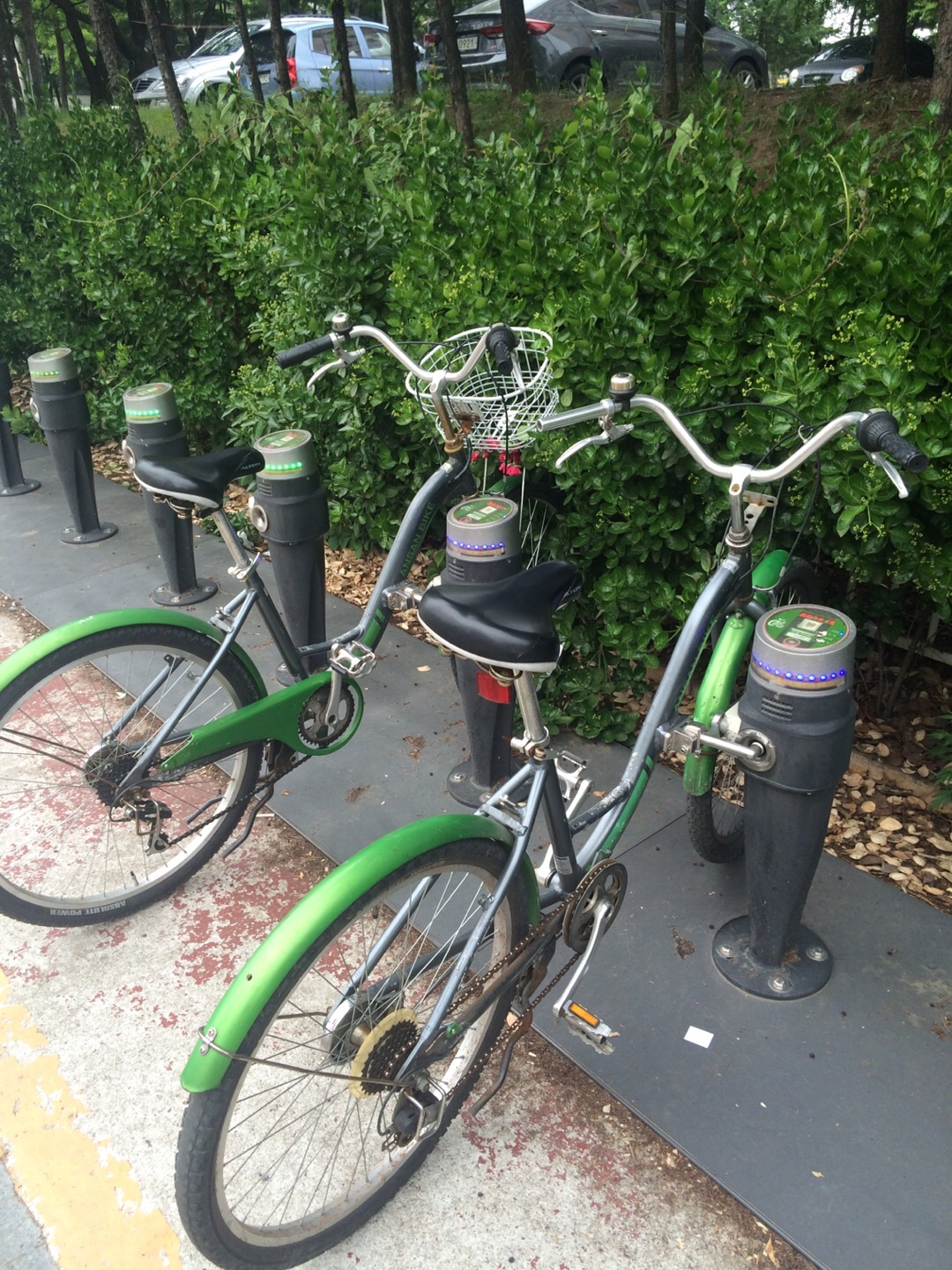
A bicycle available for rent

Nat.	Region	Name
(South Korea)	Ansan	Pedalro System (페달로)
(South Korea)	Seoul	Ddareungi (따릉이)
(South Korea)	Goyang	Fifteen (피프틴)
(South Korea)	Yeosu	U - Bike (유 바이크)
(South Korea)	Changwon	Nubija (누비자)
(South Korea)	Daejeon	Tashu System (타슈)
(South Korea)	Suwon	Bandicle (반디클)
(South Korea)	Danyang	Tabore (타보레)

== Usage ==
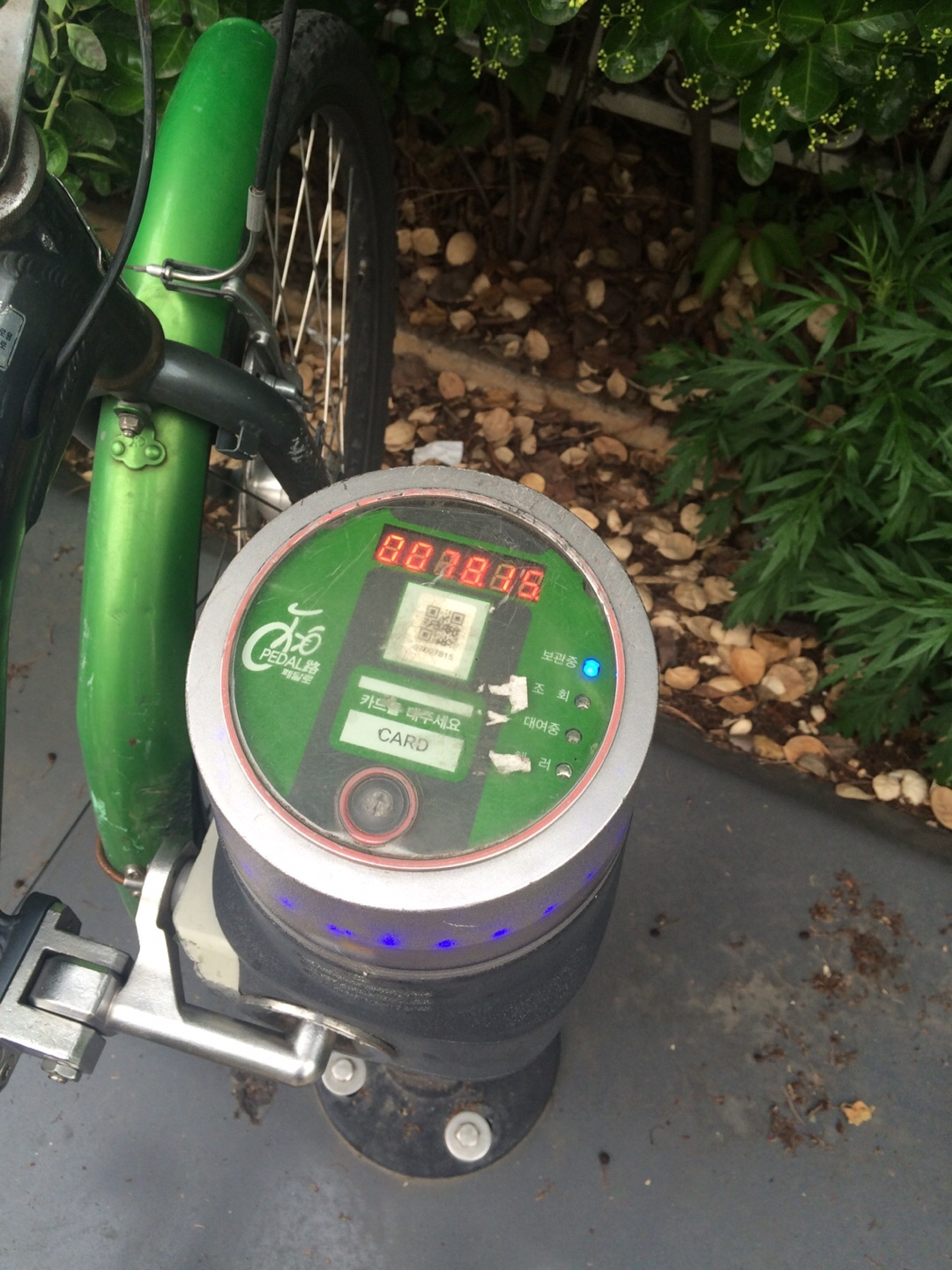
Bicycle rental equipment

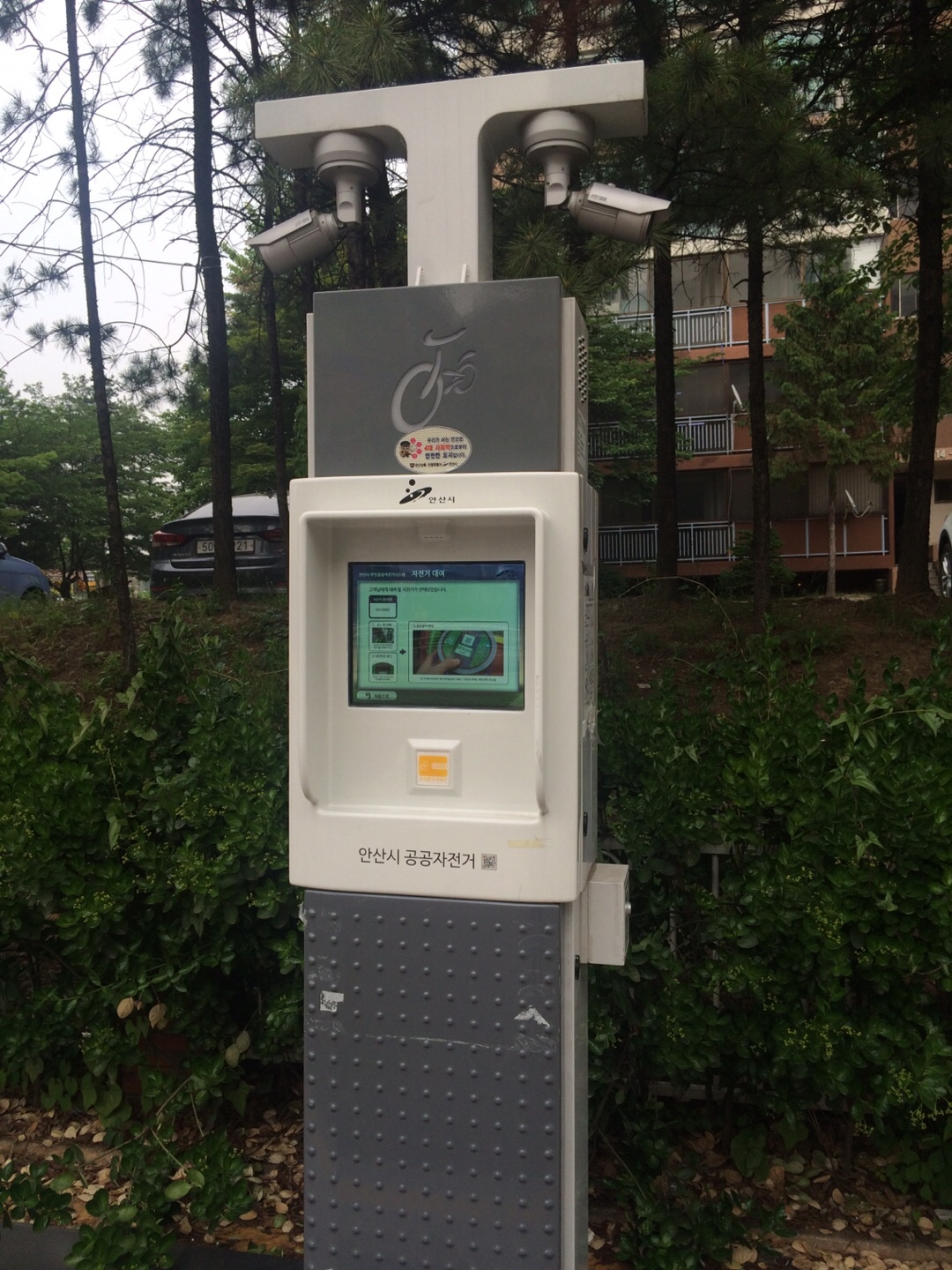
A bicycle rental kiosk

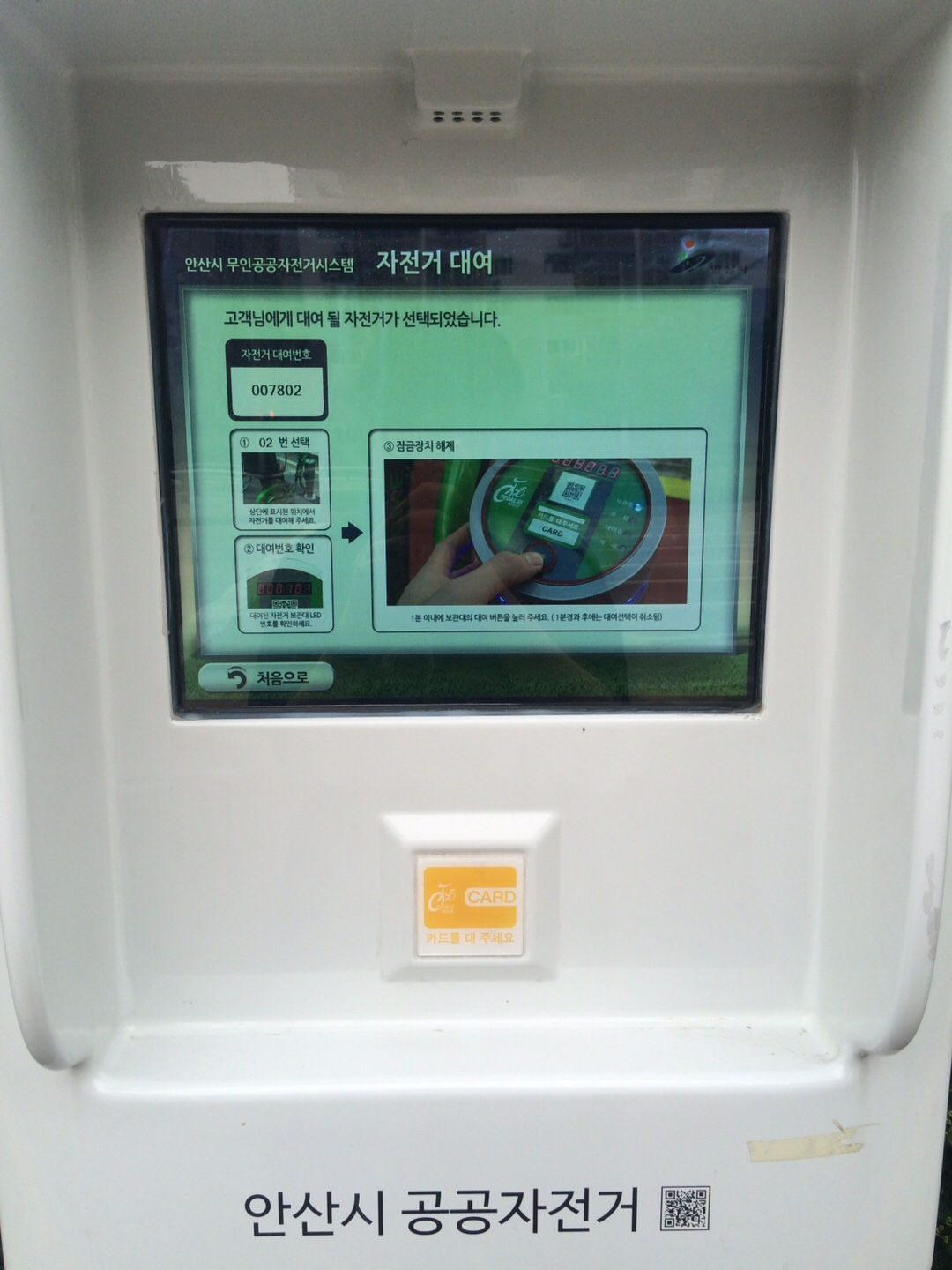
Screen of bicycle rental kiosk

Any member of the public is able to use the system by either becoming a subscribing member or paying a one-off fee.

System setups differ between cities. In some areas, users must purchase a special card in order to hire a bicycle. Once registered for membership, users are able to use the system for free. There are various types of membership, which are defined by length of time and location. However, bicycles are not required to be returned to the same hire stand from which they were removed. Rental facilities are located at many sites around South Korea where users can rent and return bikes. Members are also able to view their ride details on the system's website.

== Typical features ==
Many South Korean localities manage their own public bicycle rental system. Each city's local government administers the program, resulting in some differences between jurisdictions.

== Coverage ==
=== Seoul ===
The city government in Seoul manages its own public bicycle rental system. 25 public bicycle rental stations in Yeouido and 18 stations in Sangam-dong are also provided by the Seoul government. Stations co-locate bicycle rentals, seats, and kiosks.

=== Goyang ===
The Goyang city government manages its own public bicycle rental system named 'Fifteen' with 125 stations located across the metropolitan area. Users can either pay by credit card for one-off usage or purchase a membership card

=== Ansan ===
In Ansan, the city government's system is called 'Pedalro' with 101 stations are located in the city. Users who are members can hire bicycles for free for up to two hours after which 1000 won (approximately US$1) is payable for every additional 30 minutes. Yearly membership is 30,000 won (approximately US$28.17), a half year membership is 20,000 won (approximately US$18.78), monthly membership is 4,000 won (approximately US$3.76) and daily membership is 1,000 won (approximately US$1). Cycling in this city is very popular due to its ease of use in crowded urban areas.

=== Ulsan ===
The Ulsan city bicycle system has become very popular. Shortly after its launch, over five hundred residents and three hundred tourists used the system on a single day. As a result, the city's government has announced that the scheme will be expanded to accommodate the extra demand.

== Public reception ==
The success of bicycle share systems in existing cities has prompted other governments, such as Sejong., to consider introducing their own programs. Authorities in cities with existing systems have also announced expansion plans to cater for growing demand.

Other businesses have been established to cater for the surge in popularity of bicycles, boosting local economies. These include companies supplying protective gear and custom-designed bicycles.

The environmental benefits of the system have been estimated at 25 trillion won, primarily from carbon emissions savings as a result of bicycle usage.

== Future development ==
A number of upgrades to the system have been announced, including the launch of a mobile app allowing users to rent & return system using smartphones.
