= Byeolmangseongji =

14th century Korean defensive structure

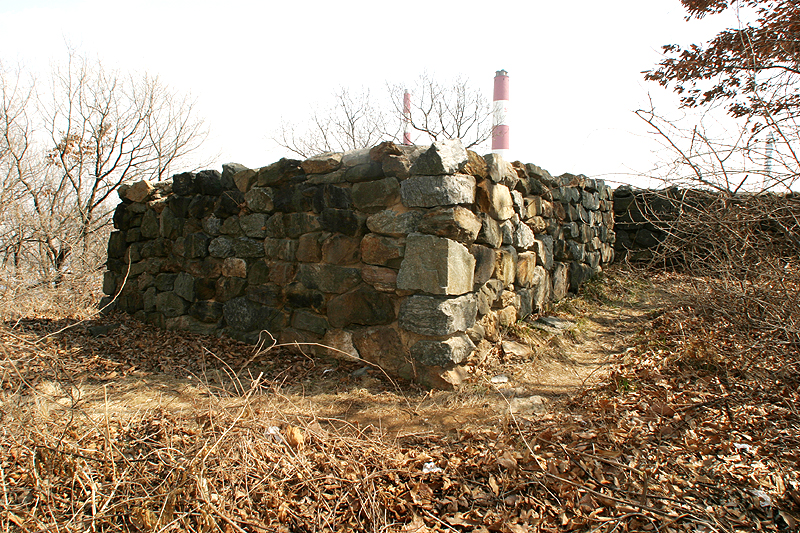
Byeolmangseong Fortress

Byeolmangseong Fortress (Korean: 별망성지) is a Joseon-era military stronghold in Ansan, South Korea. It dates to the 14th century. It linked the two valleys and was guarding the nearby seacoast.

It is classified as Gyeonggi Province monument No. 73.

It was abandoned in the 17th century. Heavily damaged during the Korean War, it was partially rebuilt since (in 1988).

An art festival is held there annually in the Fall.
