= Ansan Street Arts Festival =

Street festival in Ansan, South Korea

Ansan Street Arts Festival 안산거리극축제
- Begins: 2005
- Frequency: Annually
- Locations: Ansan Cultural Square, Ansan, South Korea
- Organiser: Ansan Cultural Foundation; Ansan City
- Website: www.ansanfest.com

The Ansan Street Arts Festival is an annual street festival held every May in the city of Ansan, South Korea.

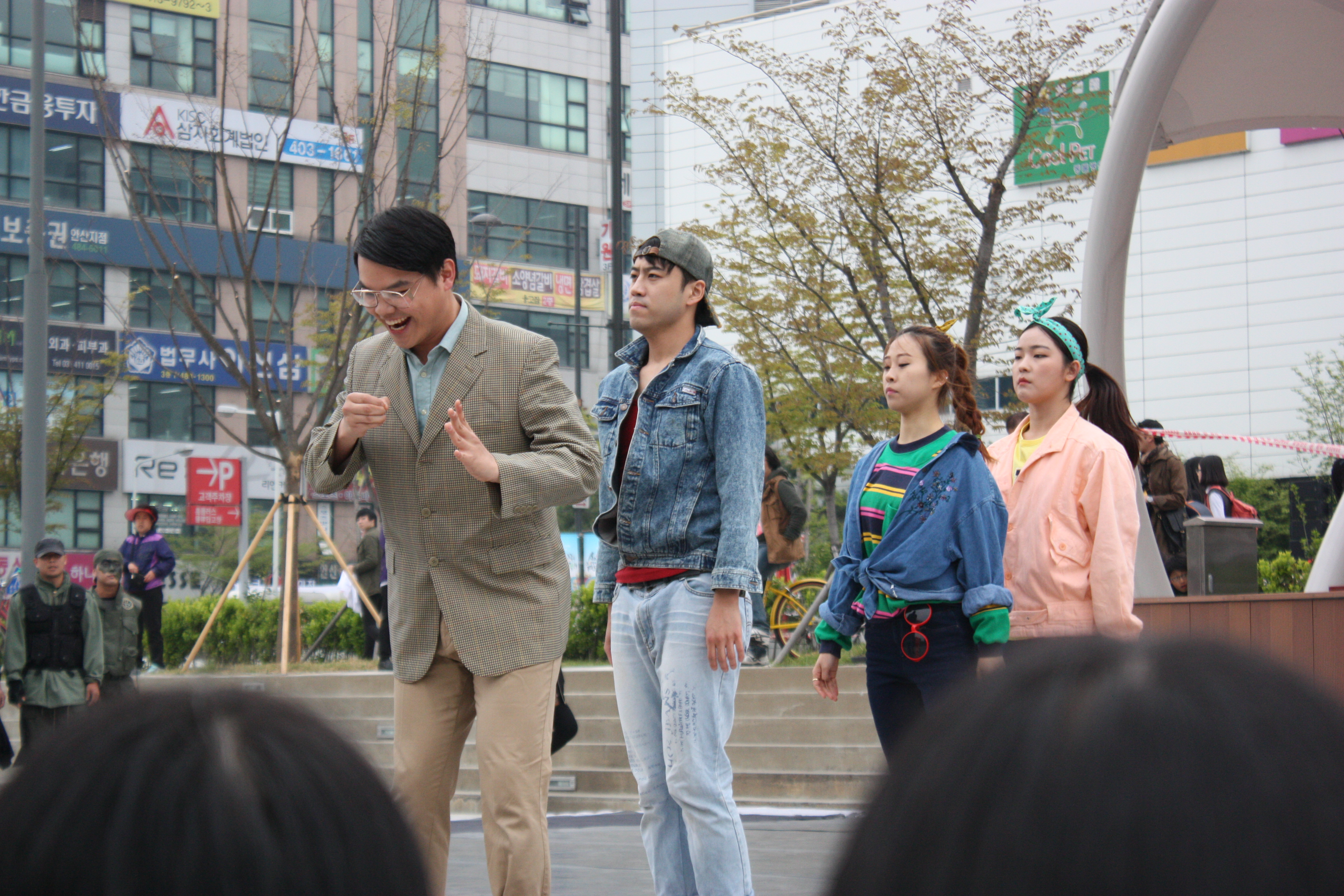
Ansan Street Arts Festival in 2013

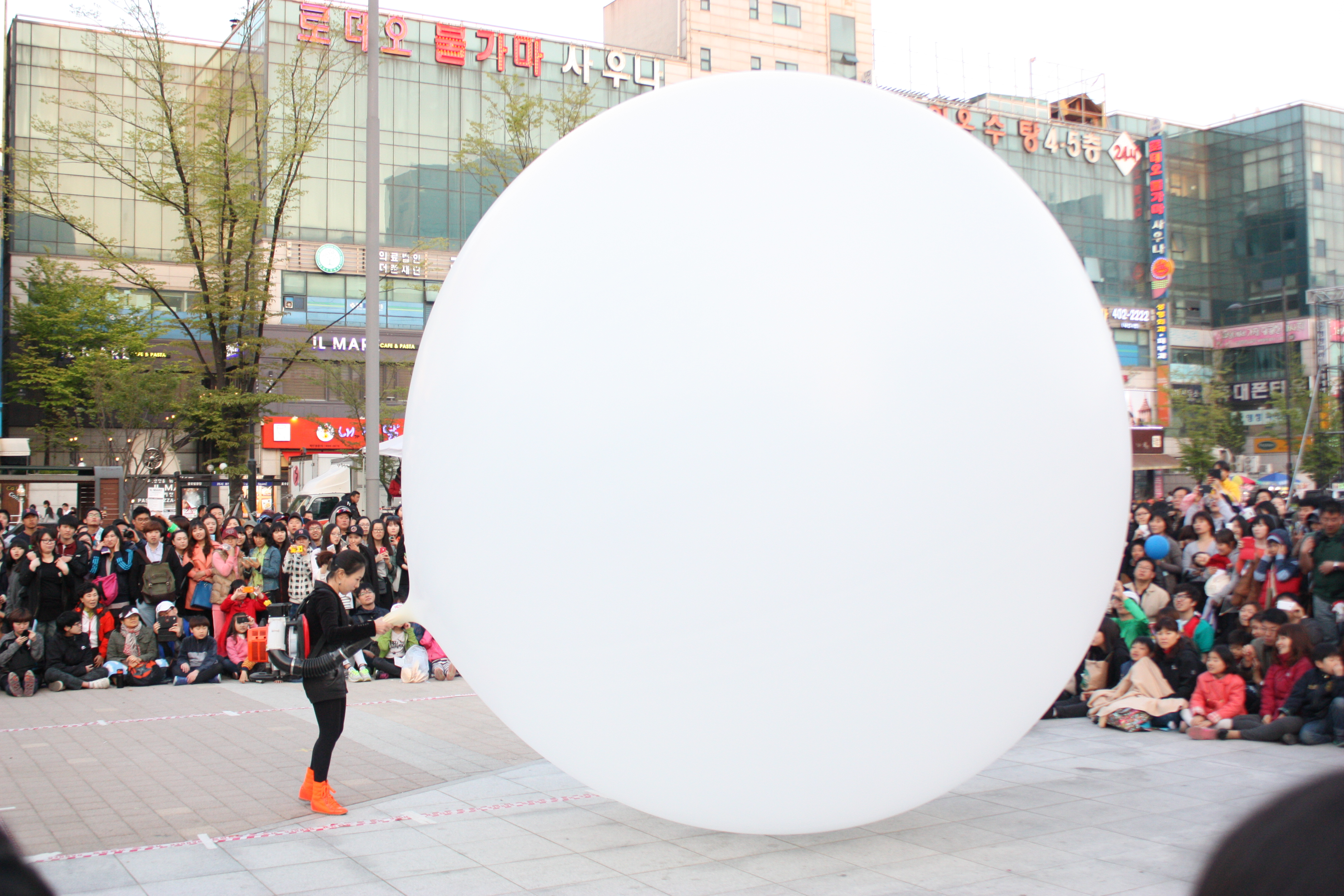
Ansan Street Arts Festival in 2013

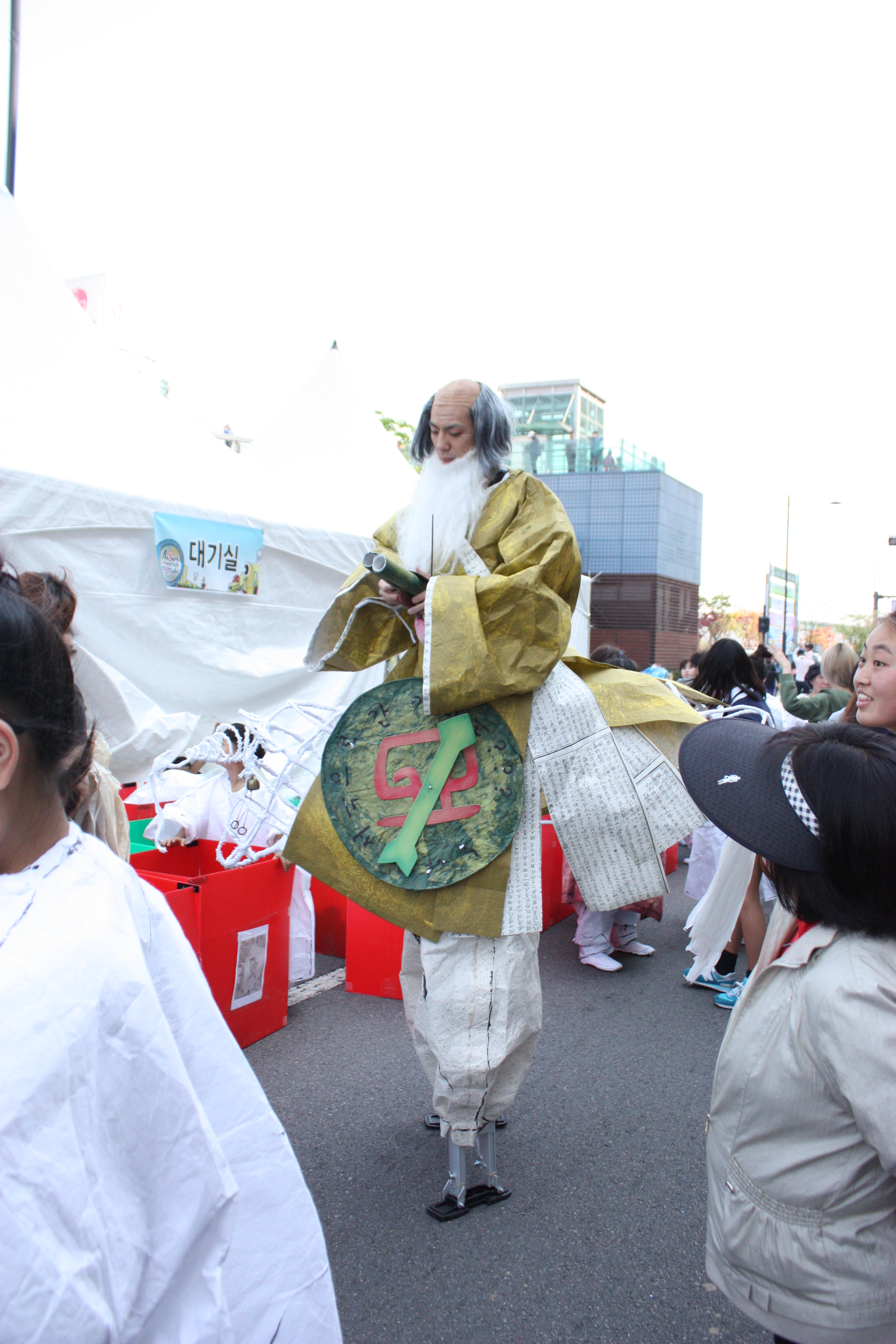
Ansan Street Arts Festival was held in Ansan

Although small shows like circuses, juggling, parades, and performances have been held on the streets, this is the first annual festival where street performances are the sole focus and theme. The festival aims to create a cultural site on the streets and change them into spaces of art. Korean artists as well as foreign artists perform. Many people in Ansan that are associated with the Street School and AISSA CLUB programs participate in the festival. They may perform a play, create an art installation, or buy products. Participants are recruited through newspaper notices.

Ansan Street Arts Festival is one of the top 10 festivals chosen for sightseeing in Gyeonggi-do. Every year, about 70,000 people gather for the festival.

== History ==
Ansan Street Arts Festival was established in 2005 to provide Ansan citizens with entertaining performances and artistic impressions while promoting the city. This street festival is a cultural tourism festival where people can eat, sleep and gain various experiences. A total of 22 teams (Overseas 12, Domestic 10) took part in the festival in 2005. It took place at the Ansan Culture and Arts Center's outdoor stage; the number of participants was approximately 10 million.

For the 2006 festival, a total of 24 teams (Overseas 18, Domestic 6) participated. It was held at the same center in 2005. The attendance was approximately 15 million. For the 2007 festival, 27 teams (Overseas 17, Domestic 10) entered. Roughly 40 million people attended in 2007.

For the 2008 event, 58 teams (Overseas 24, Domestic 29) joined. About 70 million people attended the street festival at Gwangdeok-no of Gozan and in Bravo square. More than 70 million visitors from not only Ansan but also all over the country gathered to see the 4th international performance. 58 internal and external performance teams showcased over 300 rounds of colorful performances from 18 sites and attracted visitors from around the country. Considering the number of the teams was 27 and the number of visitors was broadly 40 million in the 3rd festival in 2007, the festival's scale has nearly doubled.

In 2016, Ansan street art Festival was a performing arts festival leading the street arts, winning the National Consumer Evaluation Brand Award, and winning eight Pinnacle Awards, and growing into a large street theater festival with more than 750,000 people.

In 2018, 730,000 visitors visited.

It was selected for the 2019 Gyeonggi Tourism Representative Festival.

Stages of development:

- 1st step (2005): Over 100,000 people saw the first festival since Children's Day. In particular, it touched off a boom by starting Visiting Street Arts to schools, welfare halls.
- 2nd step (2006): To promote master of street arts through upgraded programs made media attention and maximization of public relationship.
- 3rd step (2007): The festival place was extended to downtown, so local merchants could join in.

== Programs ==
Ansan Street Arts Festivals have featured various programs, including domestic and international invited performances, classes led by international street artists, a street theater school, and planning programs such as the International Symposium. The festivals also include events aimed at multiculturalism involving Ansan Foreign Workers. Scheduled performances include percussion, comic music shows, large puppets, juggling, circus acts, magic, mime, dance, and music.

The 14th Ansan International Street Festival will be held in Ansan Cultural Plaza, and 108 performance teams from 14 countries will participate. This festival will be followed by Ansan Research 3, including the closing program. Also, Official entries, street art platforms, clown cities, and so on.

=== Performance programs ===
- Ansan Street Arts Creator: The artist who makes the work with stories of Ansan
- Official Invitation: International Invitation / country invitational
- ASAFRINGE: Place with harmony and challenge of street artists

=== Programs & Special Events ===
- Street theater school: Street play production and street Training Program
- AKSSA club: Youth clubs that can easily enjoy the festival
- Festival House: Artists' friendship and exchange of shelter
- Creative Forum: Professional meetings to promote the development of street art
- Guerrilla performances: Upsurge of the festive atmosphere and street play performances to visit
- Events: Art playground, multicultural food experience

== Sponsors ==
- Ansan Volunteer Center
- Ministry of Culture, Sports and Tourism
- Ministry of Foreign Affairs
- Gyeonggi-do
- Gyeonggi Tourism Organization
- Korea Tourism Organization
- Korean Air

== Location ==
The festival is held around the Ansan cultural square. It is in Gojan-dong and is held in the square which consists of a square of water, observatory, forest and gallery. The parade that participates in this festival passes by these squares.

== See also ==
- List of festivals in South Korea
- List of festivals in Asia
