= Gyeonggi Museum of Modern Art =

South Korean contemporary art museum

Gyeonggi Museum of Art
- Location: 268, Dongsan-ro, Danwon-gu, Ansan, South Korea
- Coordinates: 37.325768°N 126.813874°E
- Type: Contemporary art
- Website: gmoma.kr (in Korean)

The Gyeonggi Museum of Modern Art is an art museum opened in 2006 in Ansan, South Korea as an art and cultural institution for 13 million residents. Founded by Gyeonggi Province and operated by the Gyeonggi Cultural Foundation, the Gyeonggi-do Museum of Modern Art has grown into a representative art museum in the Seoul metropolitan area by communicating with visitors through collection, preservation, research, exhibition and education activities of modern art, which will be a future asset of Gyeonggi-do.

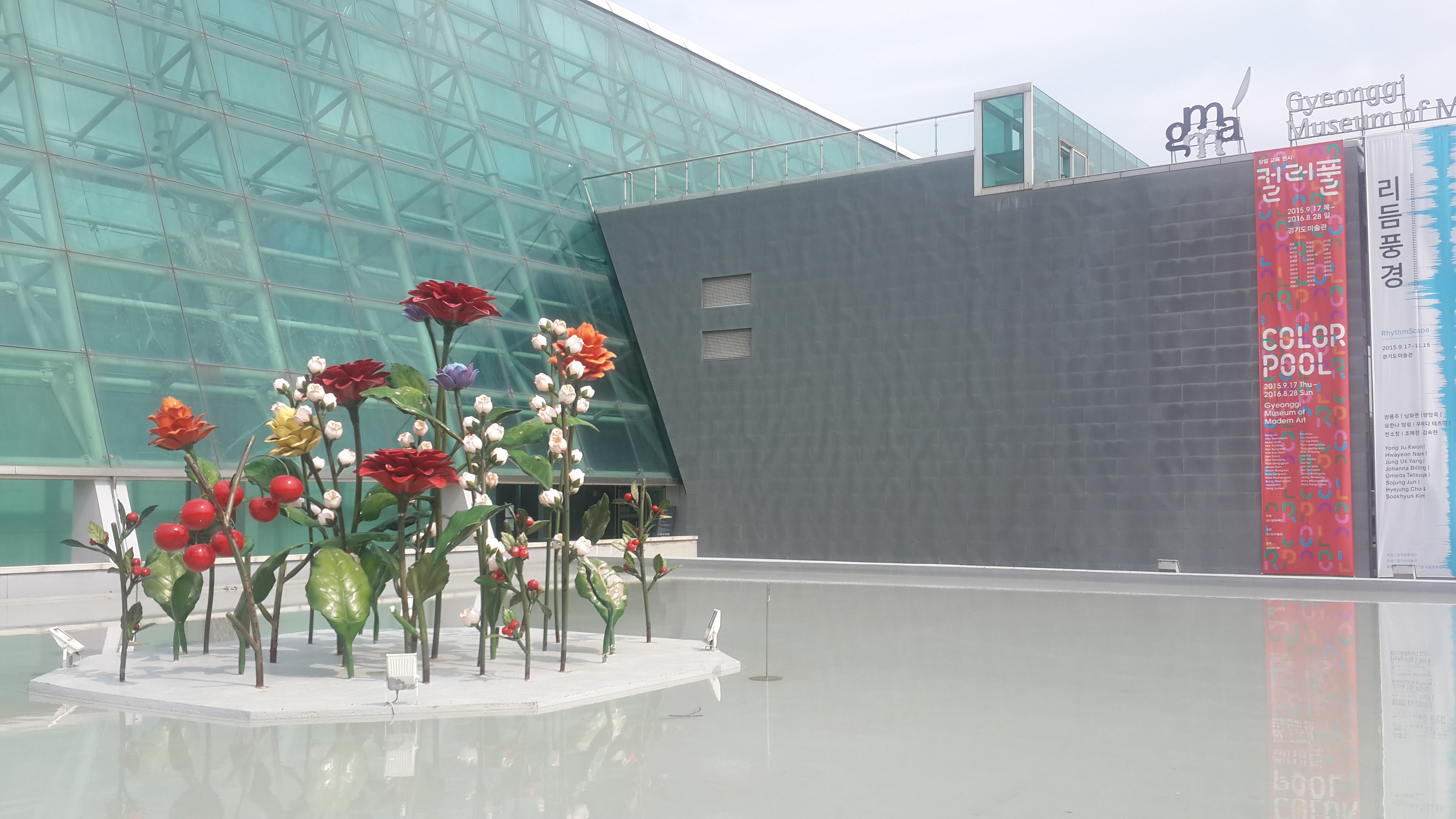
Gyeonggi Museum of Modern Art
