= Korea Digital Media High School =

- 한국디지털미디어고등학교

Location
- 94 Sasechungyeol-ro, Danwon-gu, Ansan-si; Gyeonggi-do; South Korea; 37°20′29″N 126°49′52″E

Information
- Type: Private school
- Motto: Vision, Passion, Service
- Established: 2002
- Principal: Park Ju-hyeon
- Enrolment: 653
- Website: http://www.dimigo.hs.kr/

Korea Digital Media High School is a private co-educational high school located in Ansan, Gyeonggi-do. It is one of the South Korean schools specializing in computer science. Because of the length of its name, it is usually called by the nickname "Dimigo" shortened from Digital Media High School (Korean pronunciation: Hanguk Digiteol Mideo Godeunghakgyo).

The school advertises its ratings from officially certified examinations or international Olympiads. It has the highest academic achievement among South Korean high schools. The school maintaining top 2~4% average score among Korea high schools on CSAT, it was 4.1% at 2015. Several members of the national team at the International Olympiad in Informatics graduated from Dimigo.

== Departments ==
- e-Business (e-비즈니스과)
- Digital Content (디지털콘텐츠과)
- Web Programming (웹프로그래밍과)
- Hacking Defence (해킹방어과)

== See also ==
- (in Korean) 한국디지털미디어고등학교
