= Ansan =

City in Gyeonggi, South Korea

- Specific city
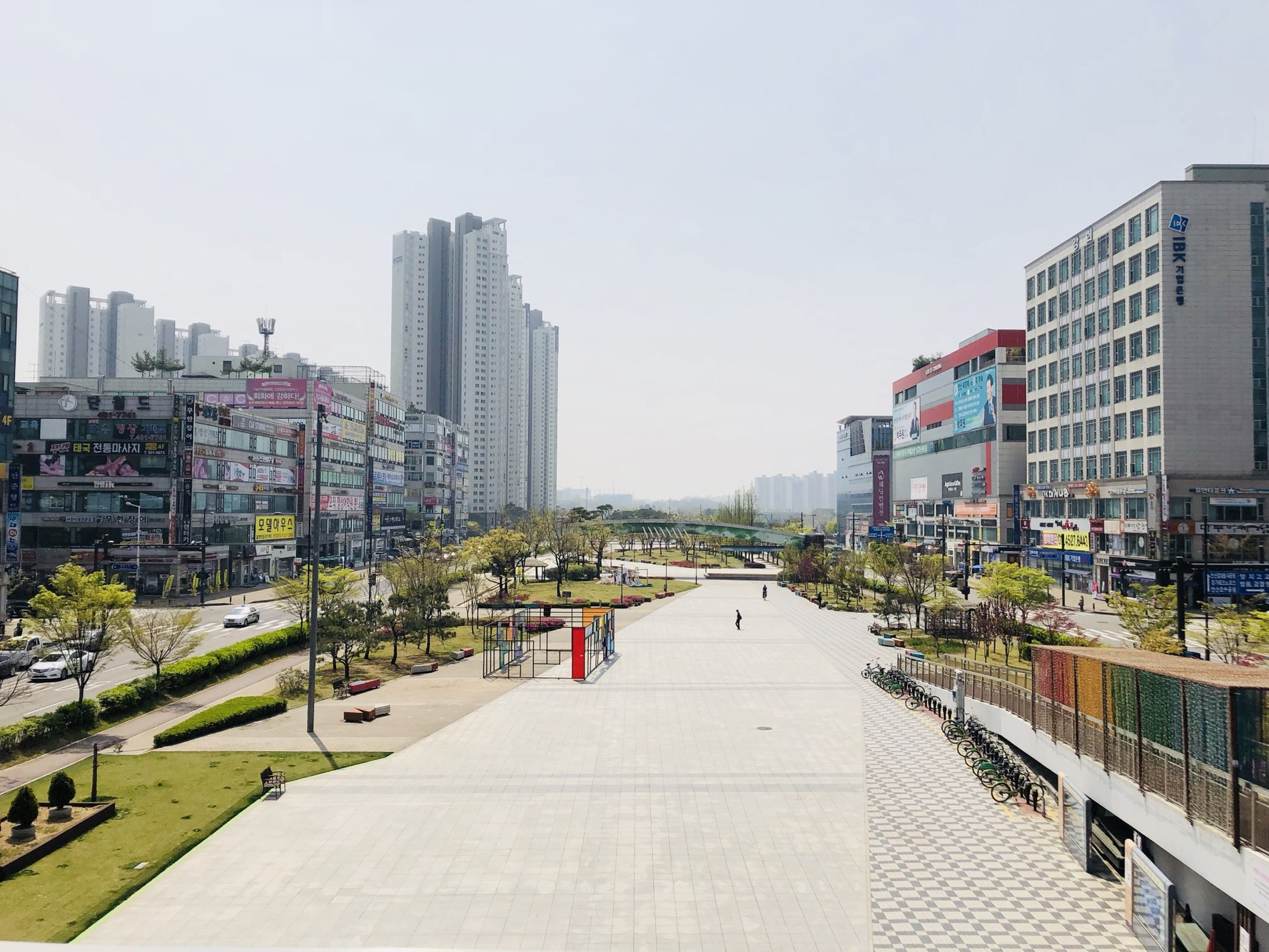
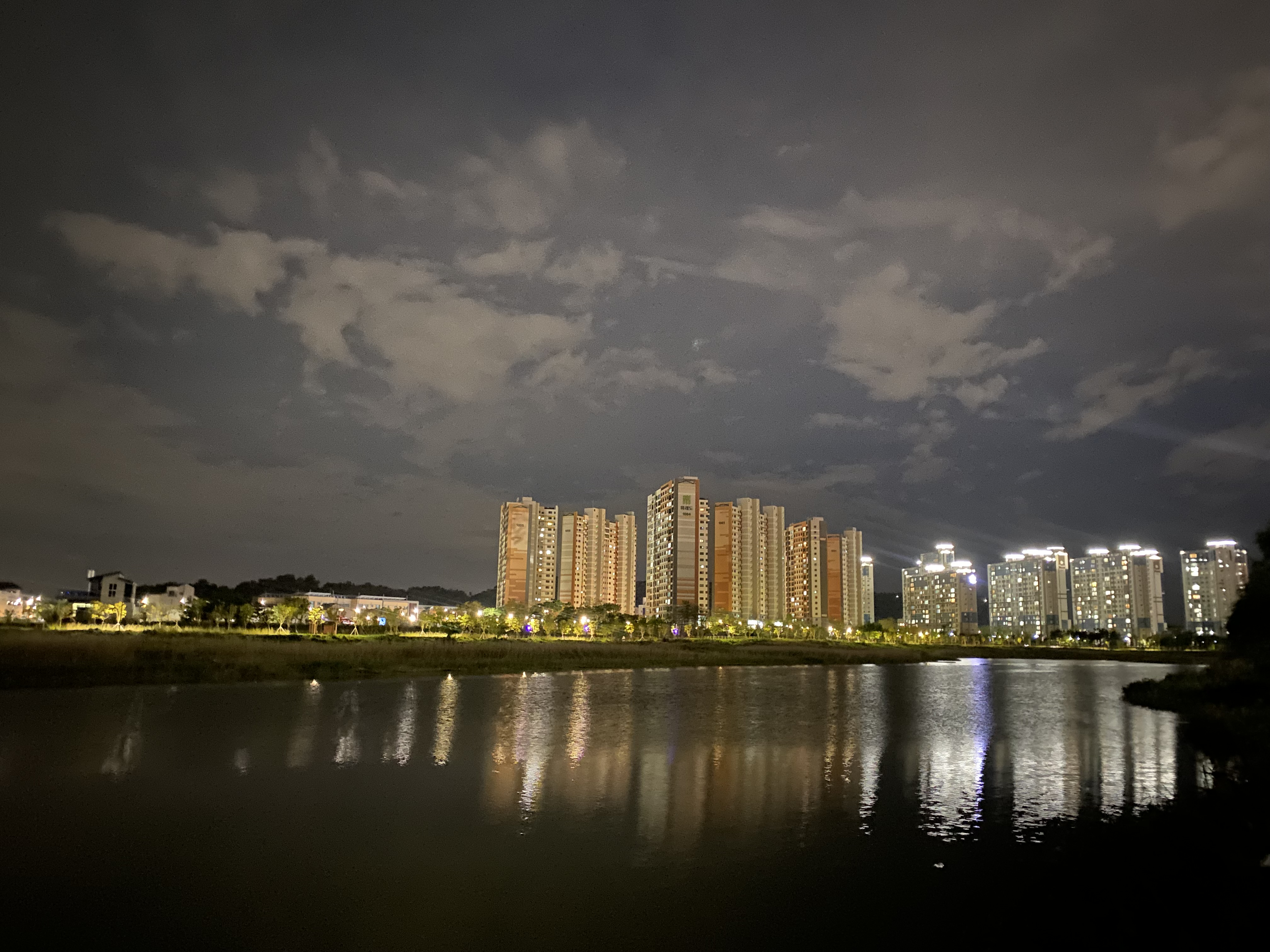
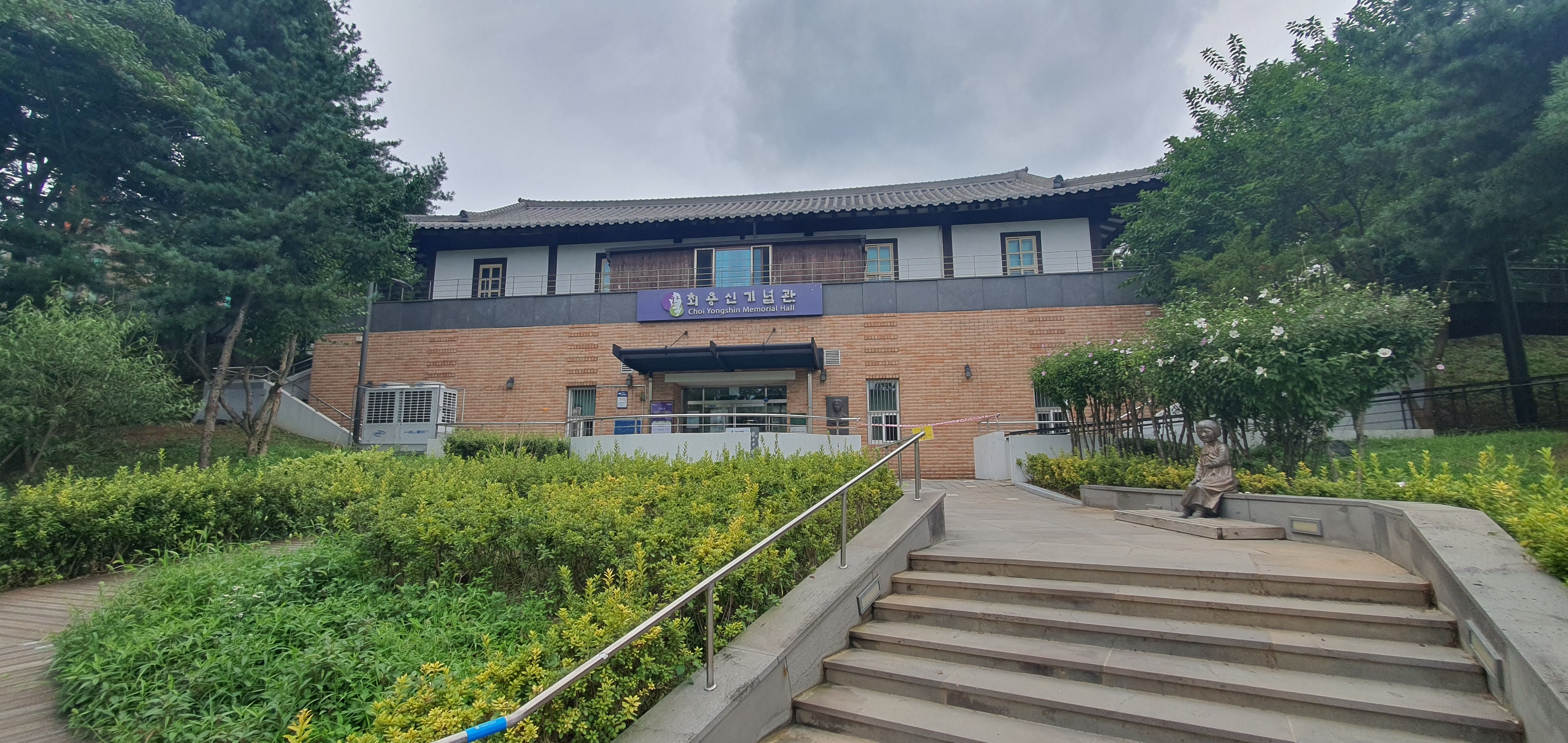
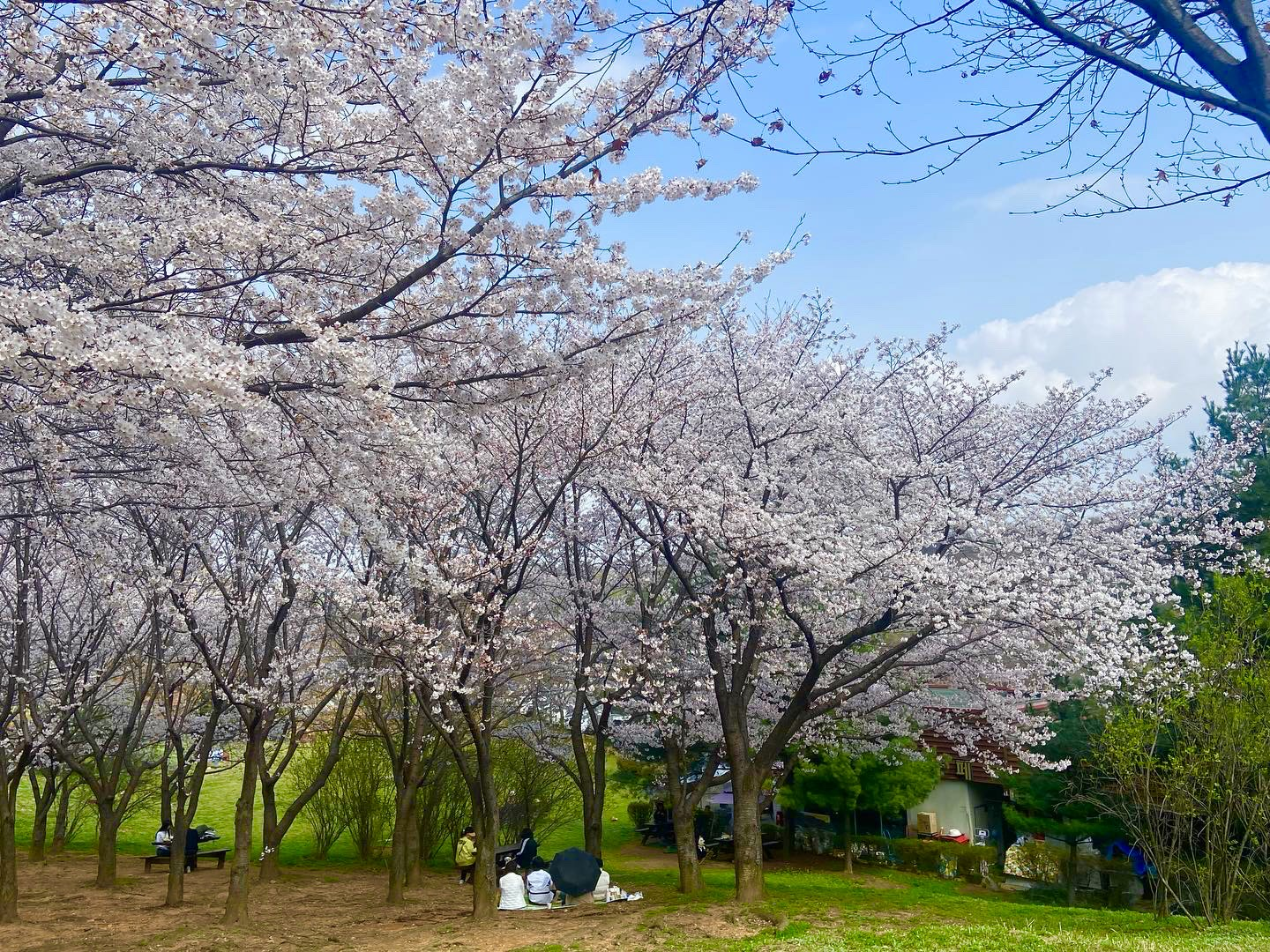
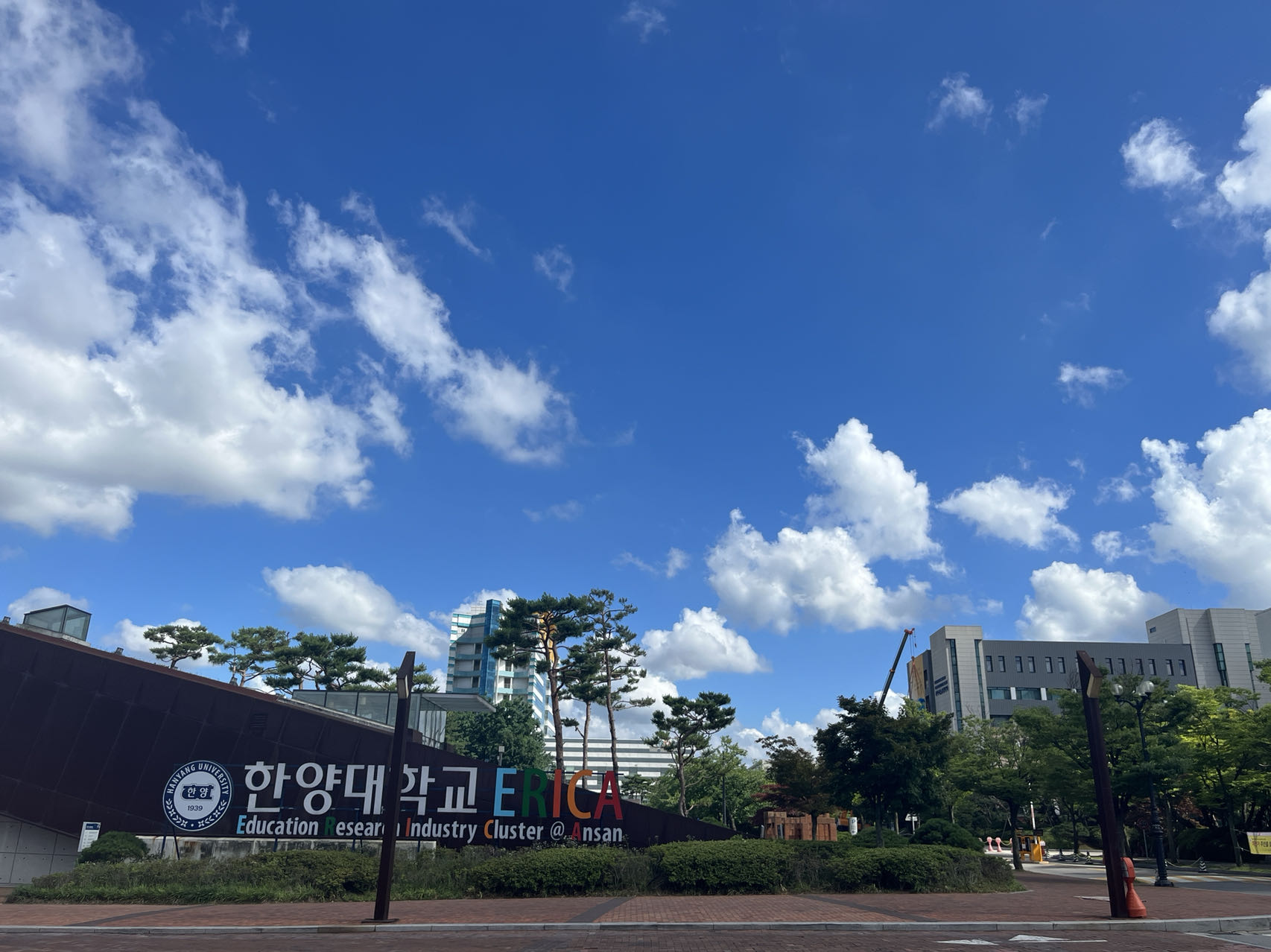
- Ansan Culture Square Ansan Reed Marshy Park Choi Yongshin Memorial Hall Ansan Lake Park Hanyang University ERICA campus

- Flag Emblem of Ansan

- Location in South Korea
- Coordinates: 37°19′0″N 126°50′0″E
- Country: South Korea
- Region: Gyeonggi Province (Sudogwon)
- First mention: 940
- City status: 1986
- Administrative divisions: 2 gu, 25 dong

Government
  - Mayor: Lee Min-Geun (People Power)

Area
  - Total: 149.39 km^{2} (57.68 sq mi)
- Elevation: 9 m (30 ft)

Population (july 2025)
  - Total: 614,772
  - Density: 4,115.2/km^{2} (10,658/sq mi)
  - Dialect: Seoul
- Postal code: 425020-426910
- Area code: (+82) 31
- Bird: Chinese egret
- Flower: Rose
- Tree: Ginkgo
- Website: ansan.go.kr

Korean name
- Hangul: 안산시
- Hanja: 安山市
- RR: Ansan-si
- MR: Ansan-si

Ansan (Korean: 안산, Korean pronunciation: [an.san]) is a city in Gyeonggi Province, South Korea. It lies southwest of Seoul and is part of the Seoul Metropolitan Area. It is connected to Seoul by rail via Seoul Subway Line 4. It is situated on the Yellow Sea coast and some islands lie within its jurisdiction. The largest and best-known of these is Daebu Island.

Several higher learning institutions are located in Ansan. They include Ansan University, Shin Ansan University, the ERICA campus of Hanyang University, and the Seoul Institute of the Arts. The Korea Transportation Safety Authority, a government agency, has also been headquartered in Ansan since June 3, 2002. With its high number of foreign workers, Wongokbon-dong has been designated as a multicultural area. In 2021, Ansan was selected as the largest residential area for foreigners and it is seeking designation as a special multicultural city. Street play festival is held every year in Ansan. Ansan joined the UNESCO Global Network of Learning Cities in 2018.

== History ==
=== Ancient era ===
The first humans in Ansan were in the New Stone Age, and many shell middens and prehistoric remains were found at Oido, Sihwaho, Chojidong and Daebudo. In the Seonbu-dong and Wolpi-dong area, over 10 stone dolmen tombs could be found. Also in 1995, Old Stone Age relics were found while constructing the Seohaean Expressway. Most dolmens in Ansan are north dolmen, but the dolmen in Seonbu-dong are table-shaped and another table-shaped tomb was found in Hakon-dong, Gwangmyeong. There are many ancient relics found in the city.

=== Three Kingdoms and Goryeo eras ===
Not much evidence or antiquities survive from the Proto-Three Kingdoms and Samhan periods in Ansan and nearby areas. The Mahan confederacy in Chen Shou in Records of the Three Kingdoms preserves writings about the chiefdom state. Ansan was in communion with Baekje but very little has been saved.

In the Later Three Kingdoms era, the Ansan area was owned by Taebong (also known as Hugoguryeo, "Later Goguryeo") in Silla Hyogong's 4th year (AD 900). After then, Kung Ye, who was the ruler of Taebong, was overthrown by Taejo, and the Ansan area was turned over to Goryeo, founded by Taejo. First, the Kung Ye Ganggu-gun was changed to Ansan-gun but the state of the military was preserved.

=== Joseon era ===
Ansan belonged to Gyeonggijwa-do (left Gyeonggi Province) in the Joseon period. Taejo's 5th year (AD 1396), Ansan-eoso (meaning Ansan fishery) that is now under the direct control of a detached building of Saongwon (the Department of foods and meals in the Joseon dynasty) was set up. After Gyeonggijwa-do and Gyeonggiwo-do (right Gyeonggi province) were unified in Taejong's 2nd year (AD 1402), Ansan was still called Ansan. Under Taejong's 13th year (AD 1413), the whole country was detached into eight provinces.

=== Modern era ===
Until 1914, Ansan and the southern part of today's Siheung consisted of Ansan County. In 1914, Ansan County was annexed to Siheung County. This region produced high-quality salt from ancient times and valuable marine products. Ansan was then a fishing village. In 1986, several towns of Hwaseong county became incorporated, representing the beginning of Ansan as a city. With currently over 600,000 residents, Ansan now has two distinct and separate districts: Danwon, which has 12 dongs as of 2009, and Sangnok, with 13.

== Geography ==
Ansan is located in the southwest of Gyeonggi-do and is situated on the coast of the Yellow Sea (locally called West Sea), at 37°19′N 126°50′E. Portions of various Yellow Sea islands lie within its jurisdiction. The largest and best-known of these is Daebu Island, also known as "Daebudo".

Large portions of Ansan, over 100 sq miles, are reclaimed wetlands, part of the Saemangeum land reclamation project known as Ansan Reed Marshy Park.

Located to the south of the city (but within its jurisdiction) are the islands of Daebudo and Pungdo. On land, the city boundaries are marked by the town of Gunpo to the east of Ansan, Anyang to the north-east, Siheung to the north and Hwaseong to the south.

=== Climate ===
Ansan has a monsoon-influenced humid continental climate (Köppen: Dwa) with cold, dry winters and hot, rainy summers.

Climate data for Ansan (1993–2020 normals)
Month	Jan	Feb	Mar	Apr	May	Jun	Jul	Aug	Sep	Oct	Nov	Dec	Year
Mean daily maximum °C (°F)	2.3 (36.1)	5.2 (41.4)	11.1 (52.0)	17.8 (64.0)	23.4 (74.1)	27.4 (81.3)	29.4 (84.9)	30.6 (87.1)	26.6 (79.9)	20.4 (68.7)	12.4 (54.3)	4.5 (40.1)	17.6 (63.7)
Daily mean °C (°F)	−3.3 (26.1)	−0.6 (30.9)	4.7 (40.5)	11.0 (51.8)	16.6 (61.9)	21.4 (70.5)	24.8 (76.6)	25.5 (77.9)	20.6 (69.1)	13.5 (56.3)	6.2 (43.2)	−0.9 (30.4)	11.6 (52.9)
Mean daily minimum °C (°F)	−9.0 (15.8)	−6.4 (20.5)	−1.4 (29.5)	4.6 (40.3)	10.6 (51.1)	16.2 (61.2)	21.1 (70.0)	21.6 (70.9)	15.5 (59.9)	7.3 (45.1)	0.5 (32.9)	−6.4 (20.5)	6.2 (43.2)
Average precipitation mm (inches)	15.1 (0.59)	25.6 (1.01)	35.7 (1.41)	67.5 (2.66)	76.4 (3.01)	100.7 (3.96)	321.7 (12.67)	225.9 (8.89)	124.9 (4.92)	47.3 (1.86)	44.0 (1.73)	19.0 (0.75)	1,103.8 (43.46)
Average precipitation days (≥ 0.1 mm)	3.4	3.8	5.1	6.3	6.7	7.3	12.8	11.2	7.1	4.9	7.0	5.4	81
Source: Korea Meteorological Administration

== Demographics ==
According to the South Korean Ministry of Justice, Ansan's Danwon District is the district which has the largest foreign population in Korea, with 68,119 residents followed by Siheung (66,103), Hwaseong (59,942), Yeongdeungpo-gu, Seoul (48,682), Guro-gu, Seoul (48,343), Pyeongtaek (42,243), and Asan, South Chungcheong (35,567 people).

Ansan City government report on foreign population January 2024
Group	Population
Chaoxianzu	48,082
Chinese	10,781
Uzbek	10,118
Koryo saram	7,631
Kazakh	3,808
Vietnam	2,415
Russian	1,604
other	11,930
^A https://www.ansan.go.kr/common/sn3hcv_skin/doc.html?fn=17089289513023KWSOE5CGOC037SD6T68U36DL.xlsx&rs=/cmsdata/preview/2024/

== Transportation ==
=== Railway ===
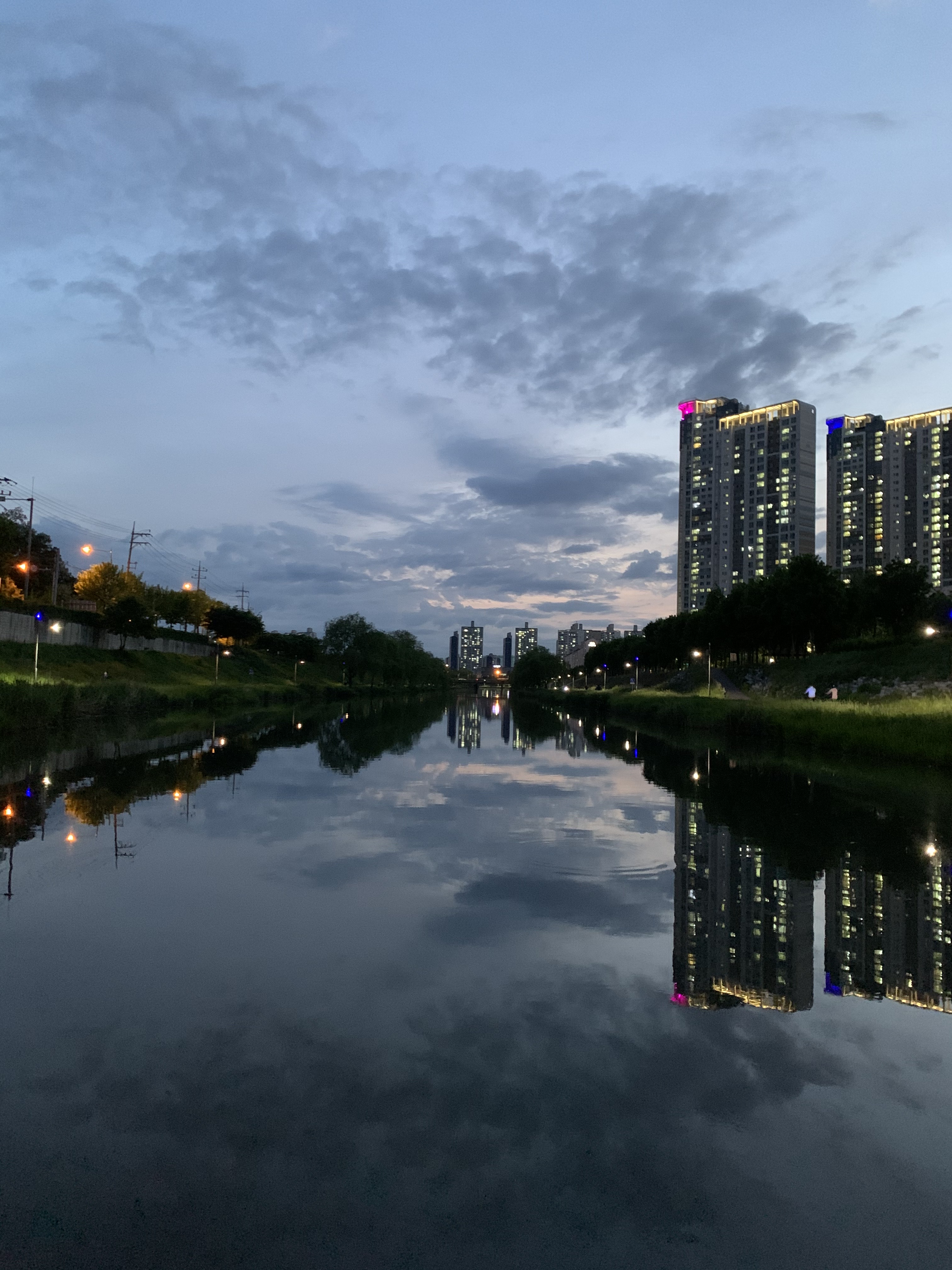
Ansan Stream at night

The Ansan Line is a major rail line in Ansan and is part of the Seoul Metropolitan Subway as Line 4. Service connects from Oido to Jinjeop in Namyangju. The subway is also connected to the public bus system in Ansan. Previously, the first railroad in the city was the Suin Line which was opened by Korea under Japanese rule. In mid-2020, the Suin–Bundang Line started operations, connecting Suwon and Ansan which expanded the living space in Ansan.

- Korail

- Seoul Subway Line 4 (via Ansan Line)

(Gunpo) ← Banwol — Sangnoksu — Hanyang Univ. at Ansan — Jungang — Gojan — Choji — Ansan — Singiloncheon → (Siheung)

- Seohae Line

Wonsi — Siu — Choji — Seonbu — Dalmi → (Siheung) → (Gimpo Airport) → (Goyang)

- Suin–Bundang Line (via Ansan Line)

(Hwaseong) ← Sari — Hanyang Univ. at Ansan — Jungang — Gojan — Choji — Ansan — Singiloncheon → (Siheung)

==== Future expansion ====
Currently, Seohae Line starts from Ansan to Sosa station in Bucheon. But the Ministry of Land, Infrastructure and Transport is extended to Goyang through Gimpo International Airport station. It was planned to be completed by 2023 and extended Seohae Line officially opened on 1 July 2023.

The Shin Ansan Line will connect Yeouido to Ansan in 2024. It will take only 30 minutes from Yeouido to Ansan Also, the Ministry of Land, Infrastructure and Transport is considering extending to Seoul Station.

Future Shin Ansan Line

Hanyang University — Ansan City Hall — Jungang — Seongpo — Jangha — Mokgam → (Gwangmyeong) → (Seoul)

=== Bus ===
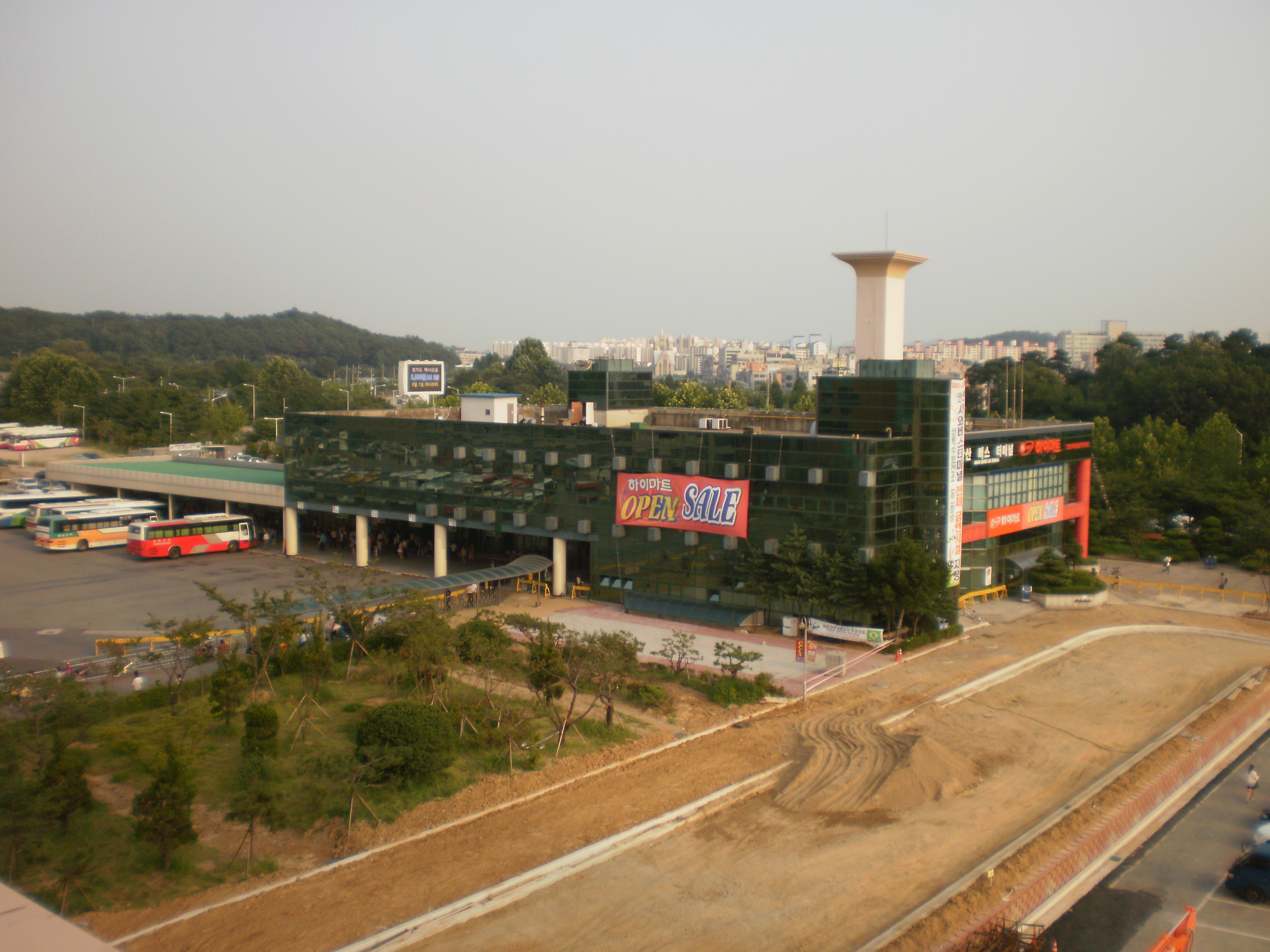
Ansan Bus Terminal

The Ansan Bus Terminal (안산종합버스터미널) near Ansan station provides daily bus service to Incheon International Airport and most cities in South Korea including Gimhae and Busan. Buses travel via Gimpo International Airport and Incheon International Airport. Express buses to Iksan, Dongdaegu, and Gwangju are also available. Near Sangnoksu station are buses going to Suwon station and Gangnam station. Ansan has 53 bus lines with 537 buses operating in and out of the city limits, connecting the city with Seoul and other outlying Gyeonggi cities. The Ansan transfer center also has express city buses, city buses, and intercity buses to link to Banwol industrial estate, Sihwa lake, and nearby cities.

=== Pedalro ===
Pedalro is a public bicycle system in Ansan. There are 101 Pedalro stations in Ansan. This is run on a membership basis. However, due to high cost for maintenance, Ansan discontinued the public bicycle service in 2021.

== Public institutions ==
The Korea Transportation Safety Authority, a government agency in South Korea, is headquartered in Ansan. Other major institutions in Ansan include:

- Korea Electrotechnology Research Institute, Ansan Branch
- Korea Elevator Safety Agency, Ansan Branch
- Korea Institute of Industrial Technology, Research Institute of Industrial Technology Convergence
- Korea Rural Research Institute
- Korea Testing Laboratory, Gyeonggi Branch
- Metropolitan Air Quality Management Office (수도권대기환경청)

== Administrative districts ==
The administrative district of Ansan is parted into 25 dong, 1187 tong, and 5884 ban. The extent of Ansan is 149.06 km^{2} (Sangnok-gu: 57.83 km^{2} Danwon-gu: 91.23 km^{2}). The population standard was 281,829 households and 761,279 people at the end of 2012, of which the Korean citizen population was 715,108 with 43,465 foreigners recorded.

Larger map of the Ansan districts. Danwon District covers the west mainland part and stretches to the sea to cover Daebudo and Pungdo islands.

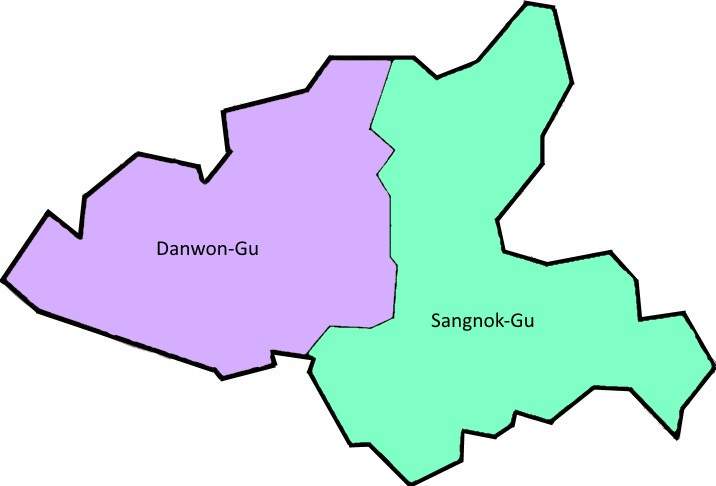
Ansan is composed of two districts: Sangnok District in the east and Danwon District in the west.

Borough	Administrative dong	Hangul (Korean)	Chinese character	extent	household	population
Sangnok District 상록구 常綠區	Il-dong	일동	一洞	2.41	11,215	23,003
Sangnok District 상록구 常綠區	I-dong	이동	二洞	2.44	13,884	22,466
Sangnok District 상록구 常綠區	Sa 1-dong	사1동	四洞	2.36	16,749	39,594
Sangnok District 상록구 常綠區	Sa 2-dong	사2동	四洞	3.65	12,740	36,395
Sangnok District 상록구 常綠區	Sa 3-dong	사3동	四洞	3.68	7,147	20,835
Sangnok District 상록구 常綠區	Bono-dong	본오동	本五洞	6.45	17,589	43,811
Sangnok District 상록구 常綠區	Bono-2 dong	본오2동	本五洞	0.82	12,300	33,038
Sangnok District 상록구 常綠區	Bono-3 dong	본오3동	本五洞	1.1	9,992	25,268
Sangnok District 상록구 常綠區	Bugok-dong	부곡동	釜谷洞	6.22	8,832	22,775
Sangnok District 상록구 常綠區	Wolpi-dong	월피동	月陂洞	5.54	17,394	35,681
Sangnok District 상록구 常綠區	Seongpo-dong	성포동	聲浦洞	1.7	9,767	30,250
Sangnok District 상록구 常綠區	Banwol-dong	반월동	半月洞	13.16	8,077	16,574
Sangnok District 상록구 常綠區	Ansan-dong	안산동	安山洞	8.36	3,842	10,026
Danwon District 단원구 檀園區	Wadong	와동	瓦洞	3.23	19,372	36,020
Danwon District 단원구 檀園區	Gojan-1 dong	고잔1동	古棧洞	1.75	9,282	24,548
Danwon District 단원구 檀園區	Gojan-2 dong	고잔2동	古棧洞	1.87	9,650	25,465
Danwon District 단원구 檀園區	Hosu dong	호수동	湖水洞	2.48	14,723	42,346
Danwon District 단원구 檀園區	Wongokbon-dong	원곡본동	元谷洞	8.12	14,884	49,007
Danwon District 단원구 檀園區	Wongok-1 dong	원곡1동	元谷洞	0.95	4,399	16,034
Danwon District 단원구 檀園區	Wongok-2 dong	원곡2동	元谷洞	0.56	5,323	17,058
Danwon District 단원구 檀園區	Choji-dong	초지동	草芝洞	21.16	17,720	45,416
Danwon District 단원구 檀園區	Seonbu-1 dong	선부1동	仙府洞	0.86	7,544	16,880
Danwon District 단원구 檀園區	Seonbu-2 dong	선부2동	仙府洞	2.07	11,619	27,390
Danwon District 단원구 檀園區	Seonbu-3 dong	선부3동	仙府洞	5.81	13,774	37,439
Danwon District 단원구 檀園區	Dae-bu dong	대부동	大阜洞	42.37	3,614	7,384

== Education ==
Ansan had Hyanggyo, nationally sponsored schools, throughout the Joseon period and Goryeo. Modern institutions of higher learning located in Ansan include Ansan University, Shin Ansan University, Seoul Institute of the Arts, and the ERICA campus of Hanyang University.

List of universities in Ansan:

- Ansan University
- Hanyang University, ERICA campus at Ansan
- Seoul Institute of the Arts
- Shin Ansan University
- Korea Hotel Tourism College

There are 24 high schools, 29 middle schools, 54 elementary schools and 96 kindergartens in the city. Danwon High School in Ansan was particularly affected by the Sinking of the MV Sewol in 2014 as a large number of the passengers were students from the school, and city streets featured many ribbon memorials and other markers and ceremonies for the disaster. Ansan Seo Elementary School a.k.a. Ansan West Elementary School in Wongok-dong has a multicultural program with students from other countries, a rarity in South Korean education.

== Economy ==
Because Ansan is a planned city built behind the Ansan Smart Hub following the government's industrial planning, the proportion of agriculture in the Ansan economy is very low. Meanwhile, as the government promoted a manufacturing industry plan in the Ansan area before Ansan was built, many people work in the manufacturing industry. There are two national industrial complexes, Banwol and Sihwa, as well as the local Banwol plating industrial complex.

== Cultural institutions and heritage ==
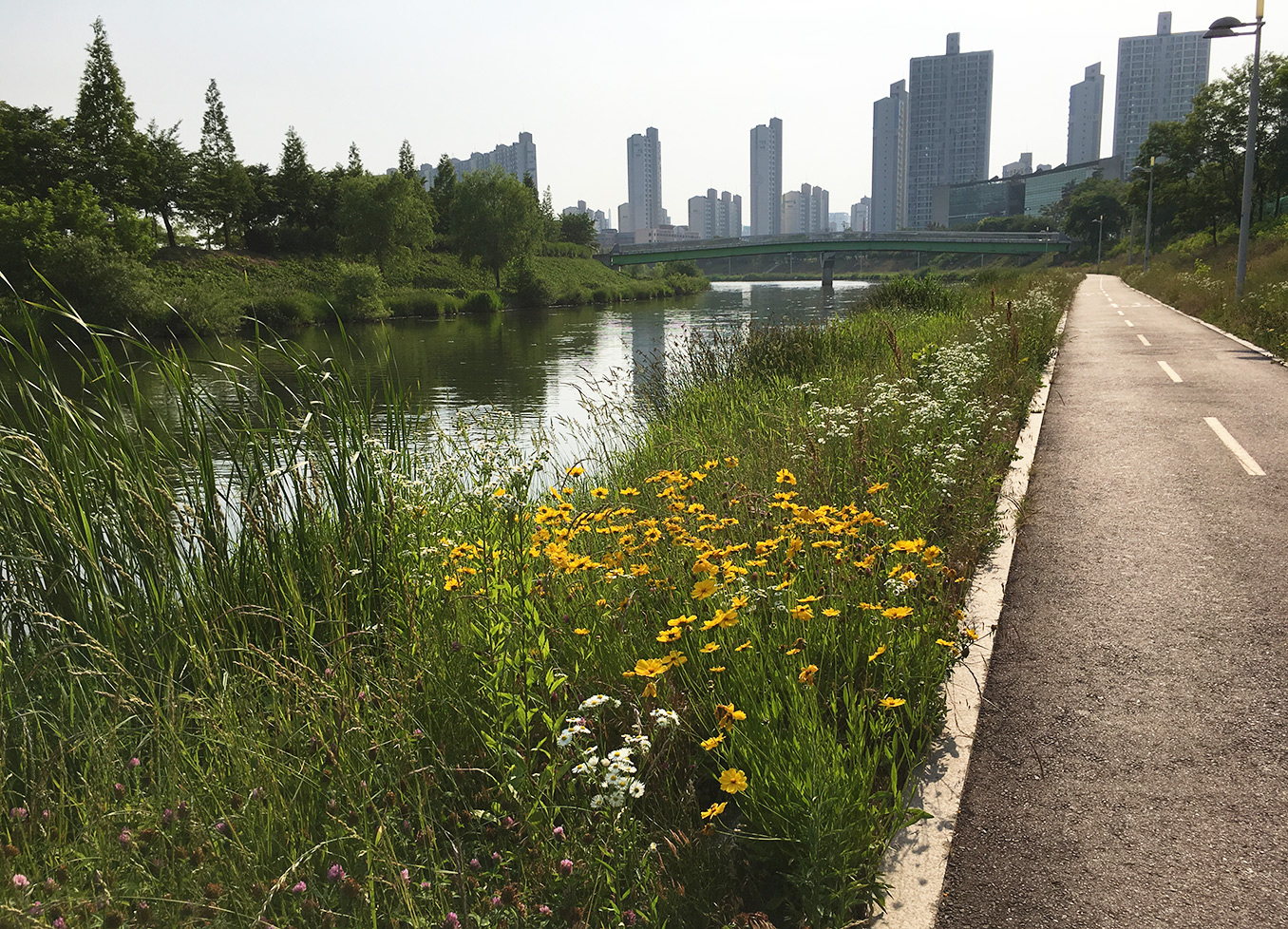
Walking path along Ansan Canal in summer

In the past, Ansan had fewer attractions and a poor reputation due to its industrial and fishing roots, but the east side of the city has recently experienced several beautification projects. The canal systems which bisect the city have bicycling and walking paths, and are covered with roses, tulips, and cherry blossoms in spring. A community bicycle system sponsored by the city is also available for park access and riding. Nowadays, Ansan has many museums and galleries, such as the Ansan Culture and Arts Center, Seongho Memorial Hall, Danwon Sculpture Park, and Hwarang Public Garden. Ansan has run city bus tours for cultural heritage sightseeing since 2008.

=== Events ===
The Jet-mer-ri village deity is held every year in the Jet-mer-ri shrine to the village deity from 1984, and since 1987 the Beal-Mang-Sung art festival is held. Also, since 1991 the Danwon art festival and since 1996 the Sung-ho cultural festival is held. The Ansan Street Arts Festival is held in Ansan Culture Square in May since 2005. Other festivals in Ansan include:

- Ansan Kim Hong-do Festival (September)
- Ansan Daebu Island: The scent of ocean tulip festival (April)
- Ansan Street Arts Festival (May)
- Ansan Valley Rock Festival (July)
- Byeolmangseong Art Festival (September)
- Seongho Cultural Festival (May)

=== Historical monuments and structures ===
Historical monuments and structures in Ansan include:

- Ansan Town Wall
- Byeolmangseong Fortress
- Cheongmundang
- Daebudo Island Charity Monument (Daebudo Jaseonbi)
- Gosong Pavilion
- Hong Jeonghui Gate of Filial Duty (Hongjeonghui Hyojamun)
- Jaetmeori Local God Shrine
- Korean Juniper Tree in Palgok-ri
- Ojeonggak Pavilion
- Sasechungyeolmun (Shrine of Loyalty, Virtue and Filial Duty)
- Seonbu-dong Dolmens
- Ssanggyesa
- Tomb of Ahn Tandae
- Tomb of Choi Hon
- Tomb of Gang Jing
- Tomb of General Choi Jeong-geoi
- Tomb of Han Eungin
- Tomb of Hong Cheoyun
- Tomb of Jeong Eonbyeok
- Tomb of Princess Jeongjeong
- Tomb of Yi Ik
- Tomb of Yi Inhyeon
- Tomb of Yu Seok
- Tomb of Yun Gang

=== Modern monuments and cultural institutions ===
Modern monuments and cultural institutions in Ansan include:

- Gyeonggi Museum of Art (sometimes known as the Ansan Art Museum)
- Ansan Botanical Garden
- Ansan Cultural Center
- Ansan Culture and Arts Center
- Ansan Lighthouse
- Ansan Sled Park
- Choi Yong-sin Memorial Hall
- Fishing Village Folk Museum
- Gyeonggi English Village Ansan Camp (also known as Ansan Hwajeong English Village)
- Olympic Memorial Hall
- Seongho Memorial Hall

=== Parks and natural landmarks ===
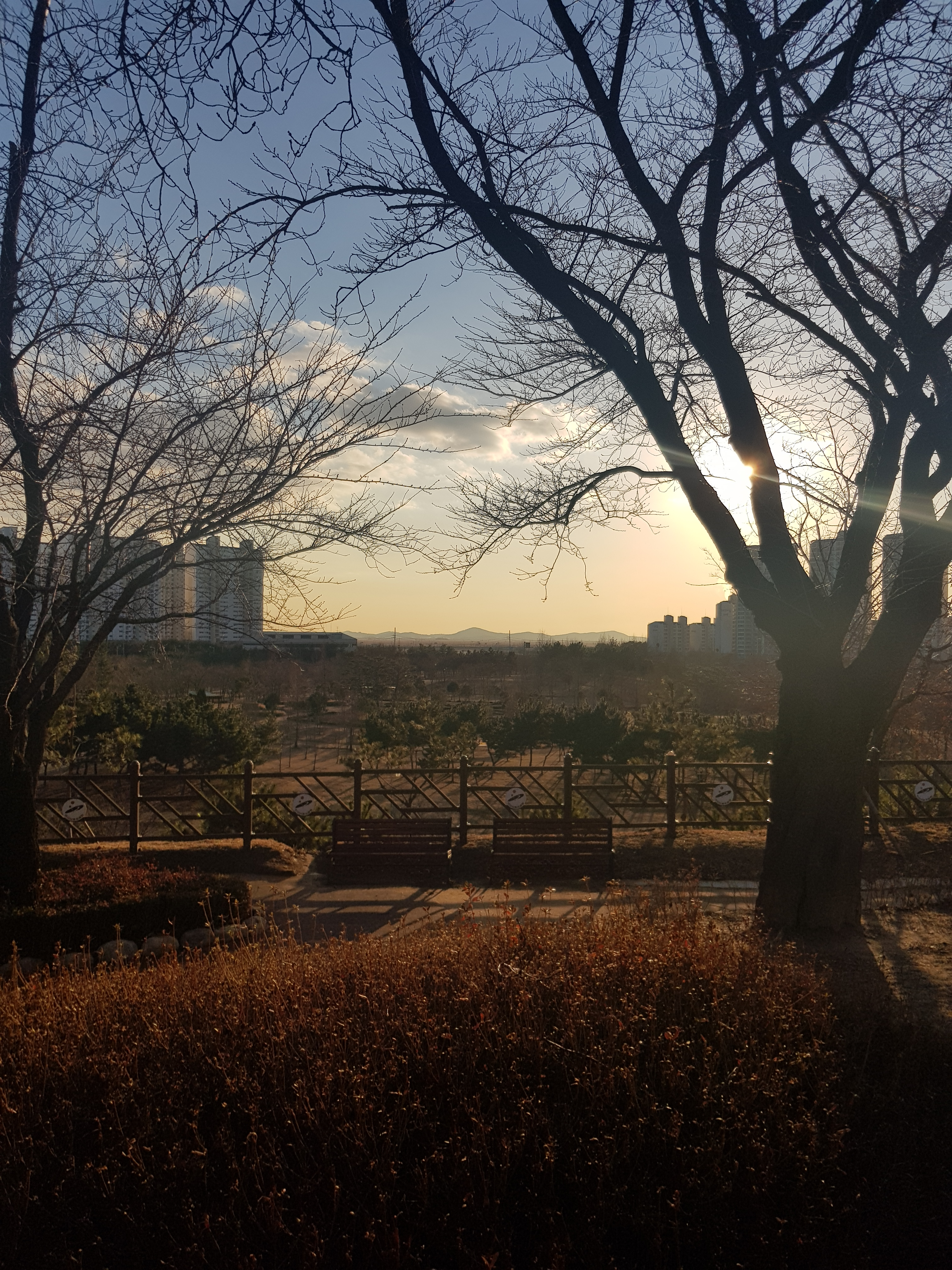
Ansan Lake Park

Ansan is home to several parks, including:

- Ansan Lake Park
- Daebu Island
- Hwarang Public Garden
- Lake Sihwaho
- Mt. Gwangdeoksan
- Mt. Surisan
- Nojeok Bong Park
- Seongho Park
- Seongpo Arts Square
- Sihwaho Lake Reed Marsh Park
- Marronniergongwon Park

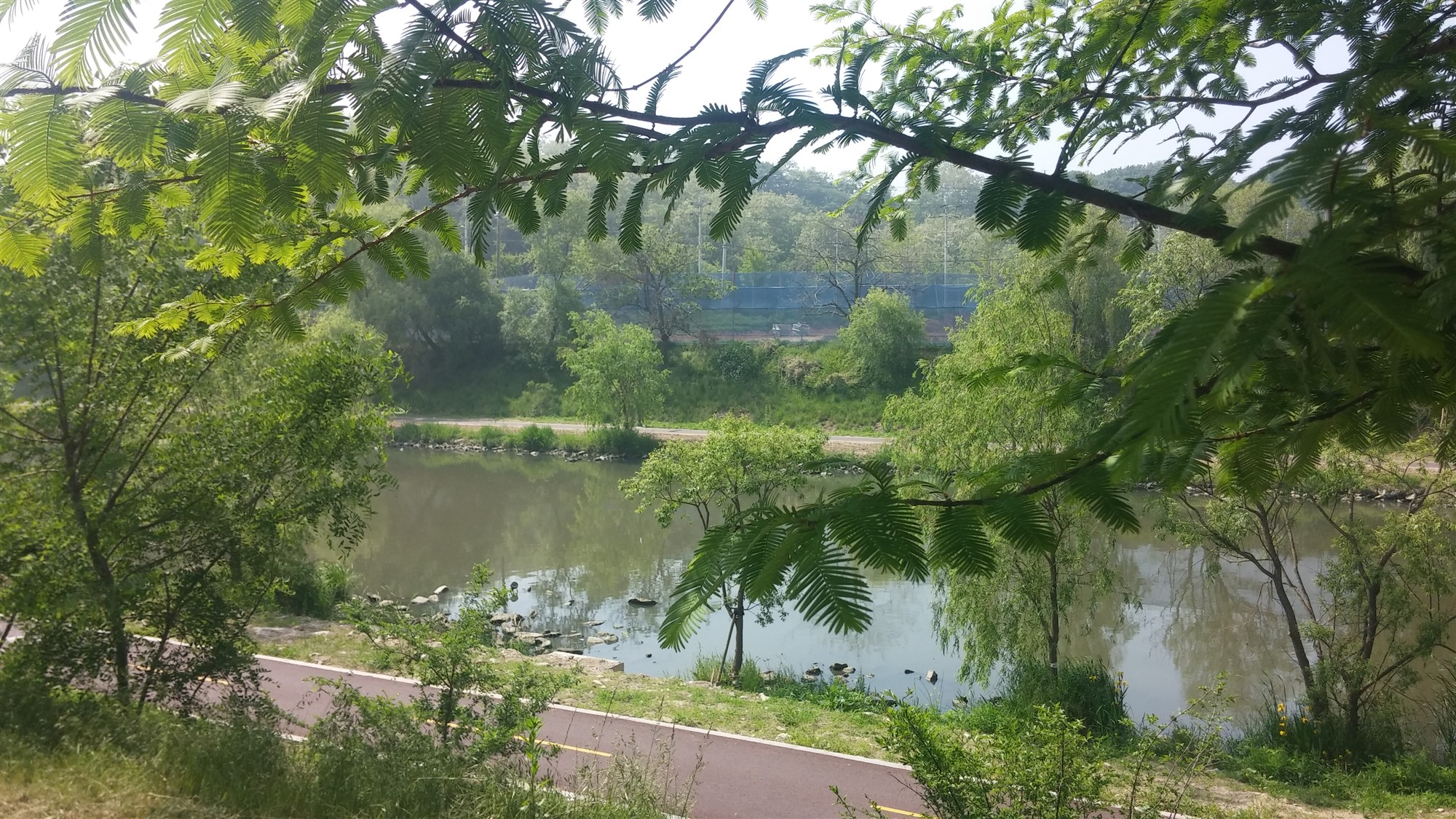
Ansan canal through trees

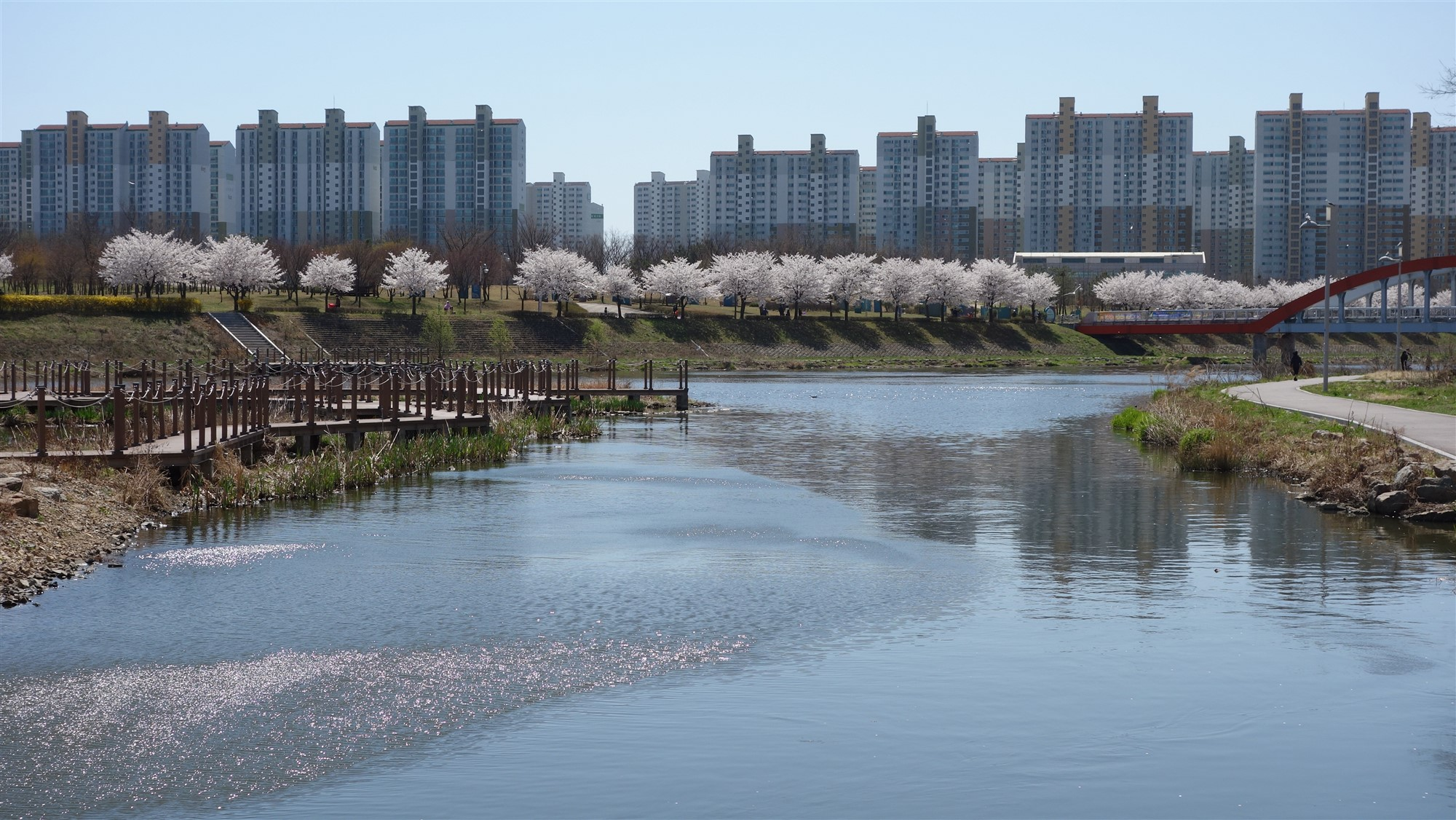
Ansan Canal, South Korea

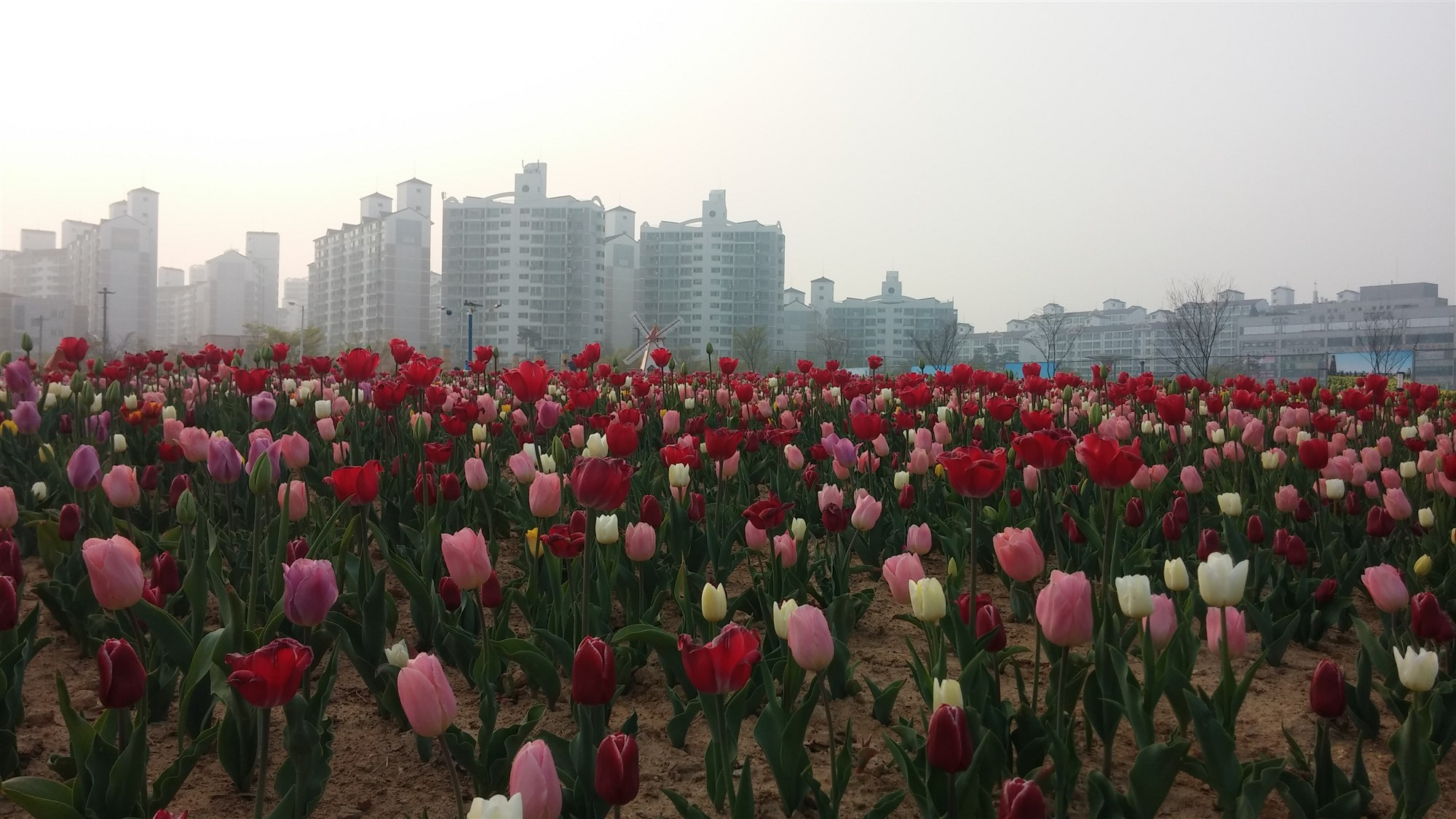
Ansan Dutch Garden Roses

=== Sports ===
Large and small stadiums have been founded from the 1990s on in Ansan. Major sports events in the city take place at the Ansan Wa~ Stadium.

The city was home to Shinhan Bank S-Bird Woman's Basketball Team (member of the Women's Korean Basketball League). The team moved to Incheon in 2014. It was also a home to the now-defunct National League soccer club Ansan Hallelujah.

Ansan is also home to Ansan OK Financial Group Okman volleyball club. They are members of the V-League.

Ansan established a professional football team called the Ansan Greeners FC. In its first year, the team also received the "Plus Stadium" award and the "Full Stadium" award. At present (April 10, 2018), the Ansan Grinders FC has placed second.

=== Television series and films ===
- A Man Called God (filmed at the pension complex on Daebu Island)
- Boys Over Flowers (filmed at the pension complex on Daebu Island)
- Designated Survivor: 60 Days
- Heading to the Ground
- Last Scandal
- The Secret of Birth
- Hotel del Luna (filmed at Lake Park on Hanyang University's ERICA campus)
- Twenty (filmed at the College of Business on Hanyang University's ERICA campus)
- While You Were Sleeping (2017 TV series; filmed at Suwon District Prosecutor's Office Ansan Branch)

== Sister cities ==
=== Sister cities (foreign cities) ===
- Anshan, Liaoning, China
- Kholmsk, Russia
- Las Vegas, Nevada, United States
- Yuzhno-Sakhalinsk, Russia

=== Sister cities (domestic cities) ===
- Buan County, North Jeolla Province
- Cheongdo County, North Gyeongsang Province
- Cheongyang County, South Chungcheong Province
- Chuncheon, Gangwon State
- Eunpyeong District, Seoul
- Gimje, North Jeolla Province
- Haenam County, South Jeolla Province
- Jecheon, North Chungcheong Province
- Jeongseon County, Gangwon State
- Nam District, Gwangju
- Taebaek, Gangwon State

=== Friendly cooperation cities ===
- Aachen, Germany
- Bà Rịa–Vũng Tàu province, Vietnam
- Baise, Guangxi, China
- Leshan, Sichuan, China
- San Fernando, Philippines
- Tauranga, New Zealand
- Yantai, Shandong, China
- Vientiane, Laos

== Mayors ==
- 1st - Jeon Chang-seon (January 1, 1986 – February 10, 1988)
- 2nd - Jang Ui-jin (February 11, 1988 – June 4, 1988)
- 3rd - Lee Sang-yong (June 5, 1988 – December 26, 1989)
- 4th - Lee Soo-yeong (December 27, 1989 – January 2, 1992)
- 5th - Cho Gun-ho (January 3, 1992 – January 10, 1993)
- 6th - Kim Tae-su (January 11, 1993 – October 5, 1994)
- 7th - Choi Soon-sik (October 5, 1994 – June 30, 1995)
- 8th - Song Jin-sub (July 1, 1995 – June 30, 1998)
- 9th - Park Sung-gyu (July 1, 1998 – June 30, 2002)
- 10th - Song Jin-sub (July 1, 2002 – June 30, 2006)
- 11th - Park Joo-won (July 1, 2006 – June 30, 2010)
- 12th - Kim Chul-min (July 1, 2010 – June 30, 2014)
- 13th - Je Jong-geel (July 1, 2014 – June 30, 2018)
- 14th - Yoon Hwa-seop (July 1, 2018~ June 30, 2022)
- 15th - Lee Min-Geun (July 1, 2022~)

== Notable people ==
- Actors: Lee Chung-ah, Lee Tae-sung
- Models: Hye-rim Park
- Singers: Lee Ji-hyun (Jewelry), Kang Seul-gi (Red Velvet), Choi Soobin (TXT), Jo Haseul (Loona), Bang Jae-min
- Baseball players: Kim Kwang-hyun, Kim Min-woo
- Volleyball players: Kim Yeon-koung
- Soccer players: Cho Gue-sung

== Exchanges ==
- Council of the National Multicultural City
- Council of the National Lifelong Learning City
- Metropolitan Mayor Nationwide Council

== See also ==
- List of islands in Ansan
- Ansan Street Arts Festival
- Korea Digital Media High School
