= Ansan University =

South Korean educational institution

Coordinates: 37.310°N 126.876°E

- 안산대학교
- Ansan University Logo
- Motto: 진리,자유,성실,
- Motto in English: Truth, Liberty, Faithfulness
- Type: Private
- Established: 1972
- Affiliations: Sae-bit Academy (새빛학원)
- Principal: Dong yeol Yoon
- Students: 5,637
- Location: Ansan, Gyeonggi, South Korea
- Animal, Flower, Tree: Crane, Rose, Pine
- Colors: Blue:
- Website: www.ansan.ac.kr

- Ansan University
- Hangul: 안산대학교
- Hanja: 安山大學校
- RR: Ansan daehakgyo
- MR: Ansan taehakkyo

Ansan University (Korean: 안산대학교) is a 3,4-year university located in Ansan City, Gyeonggi province, South Korea. It hosts a student body of about four thousand, and offers programs in fields including nursing, physiotherapy, early childhood education, and information technology. The school was originally named Ansan 1 University.

== History ==
The university opened its doors as Incheon health College of Nursing in 1972. In 1994, it changed both its name and location, moving to its present site in Ansan and taking the name Ansan Technical College. It was renamed Ansan 1 University in 1998. In 2012, the school name was changed to Ansan University.

== Department ==
=== Health Care ===
- Department of Physical Cure
- The Department of Nursing Science
- The Clinical Laboratory
- Department of Radiology
- Department of Beauty, Art

=== Family, Social Practical Business Affairs ===
- Food & Nutrition (College of Food & Nutrition)
- Hotel Cooking (College of Food & Nutrition)
- Social Welfare
- Tourism English
- Tourism Chinese
- International Secretary (College of International Secretary)
- International Secretarial Office Work (College of International Secretary)
- Child Educating Course
- Child Care

== See also ==
- Ansan
- Education in South Korea
- List of colleges and universities in South Korea
