= Shin Ansan University =

Technical college in Ansan City

- Type: Private
- Established: 1994
- President: Ji, Ui Sang
- Academic staff: 200
- Students: 3,000
- Location: Ansan, Gyeonggi, South Korea; 37.31212°N 126.80864°E
- Website: www.sau.ac.kr (in Korean)

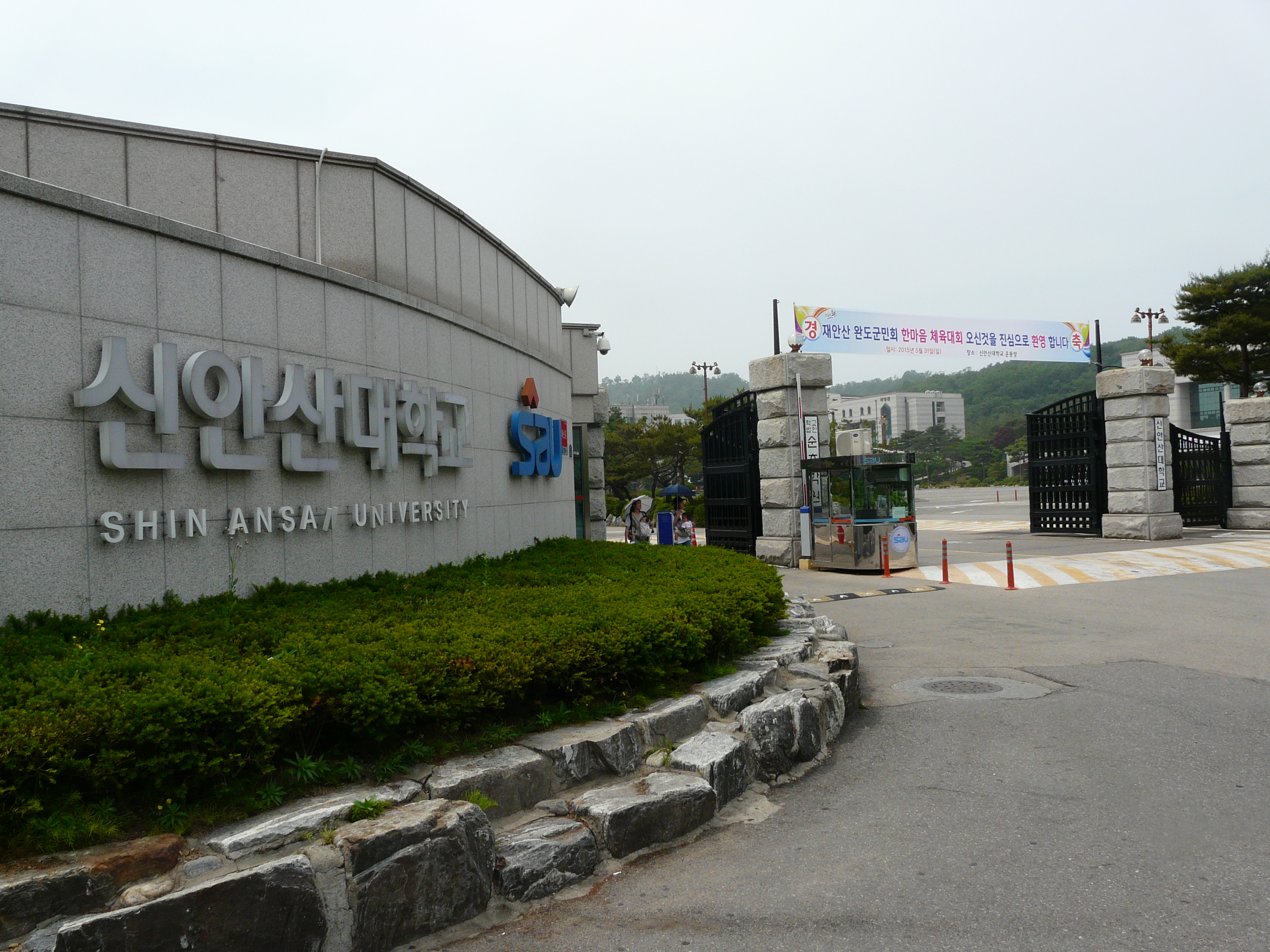
Entrance to the Shin Ansan University

- Shin Ansan University
- Hangul: 신안산대학교
- Hanja: 新安山大學校
- RR: Sinansan daehakgyo
- MR: Sinansan taehakkyo

Shin Ansan University (formerly Ansan College of Technology) is a private university in Ansan City, which lies south of Seoul in Gyeonggi province. It offers degree programs in social science (including English), tourism, physical education, industrial design, engineering, and computers. All programs place a strong emphasis on vocational outcomes. The campus stands in Danwon-gu, not far from the massive industrial complex in Sihwa with over 7,000 companies, which facilitates partnerships with local industry. The college enrolls about 3,000 students, and employs about 55 instructors.

== History ==
As is often the case with private institutions of higher education in South Korea, the foundation to establish the school had begun its activities a long time before the actual establishment: the Jisun Academy was established in 1970. The school finally opened in April 1994 as Ansan Industrial Technical College.

After changing the name to Ansan College of Engineering in 1998, the name of the school was changed to Shin Ansan University in 2011 as the departments of humanities and social sciences and arts and physical education expanded.

- July 11, 1970: Jisun Academy established
- September 26, 1991: Establishment of Ansan Technical College Establishment Promotion Committee
- March 3, 1993: Application for establishment approval of Ansan Technical College
- April 30, 1994: Establishment of Ansan Technical College
- March 14, 1995: Opening of Ansan Technical College
- September 1, 1997: Groundbreaking ceremony for the new Mokyang Hall (3,054 pyeong)
- October 15, 1998: Groundbreaking ceremony for the Social Science Museum
- November 20, 1998: Changed school name to Ansan Institute of Technology
- April 22, 1999: Opening of the Social Education Center
- August 2002: Completion of the International Education Building (2,544 pyeong)
- October 2004: Establishment of Technical Education Support Center of Industry-University Cooperation Foundation
- January 2009: Position change from dean to president
- March 2009: Relocation of new library
- September 2009: Engineering Hall (Garden of Hope) opened
- Mar. 2010: Established Police Security Administration Division
- Mar. 2011: Established Tax Accounting Department
- May 2011: Name changed to Shin Ansan University
- March 2012: Changed the name of the school corporation to Sunhyo Academy

== See also ==
- List of colleges and universities in South Korea
- Education in South Korea
