= Korea Transportation Safety Authority =

South Korean government organization

Korean name
- Hangul: 한국교통안전공단
- Hanja: 韓國交通安全公團
- RR: Hanguk gyotonganjeon gongdan
- MR: Han'guk kyot'onganjŏn kongdan

The Korea Transportation Safety Authority (KOTSA; Korean: 한국교통안전공단) is a transportation safety authority of the government of South Korea. It is headquartered in Gimcheon-si, Gyeongsangbuk-do.

== See also ==
- The Korea Transport Institute
- Aviation and Railway Accident Investigation Board, fusion of Korea Aviation Accident Investigation Board and Railway Accident Investigation Board.
- Korean Maritime Safety Tribunal
