= Ddareungi =

Bicycle-sharing system in Seoul, South Korea

Seoul Bike

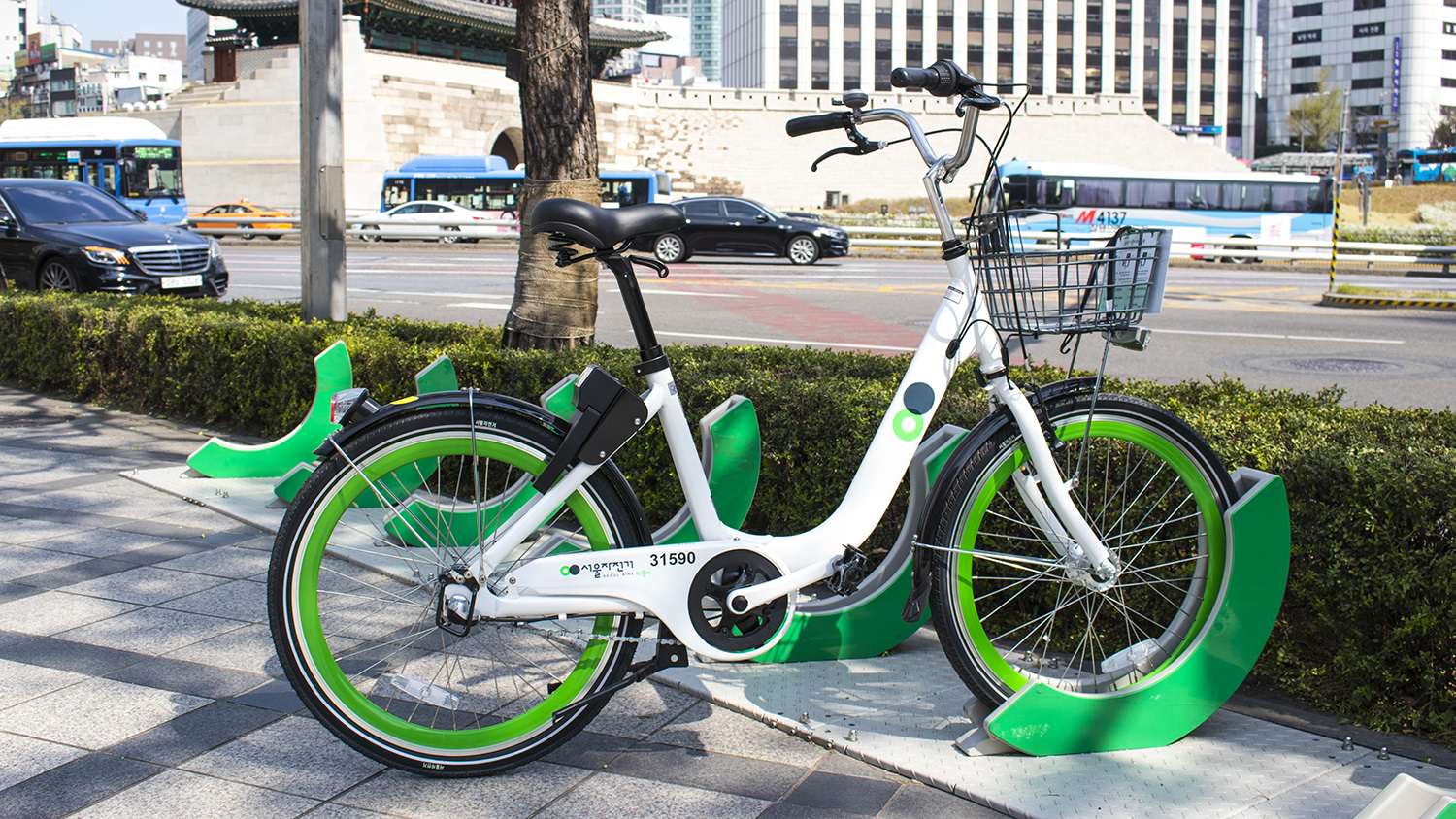
- QR type new Ddareungi

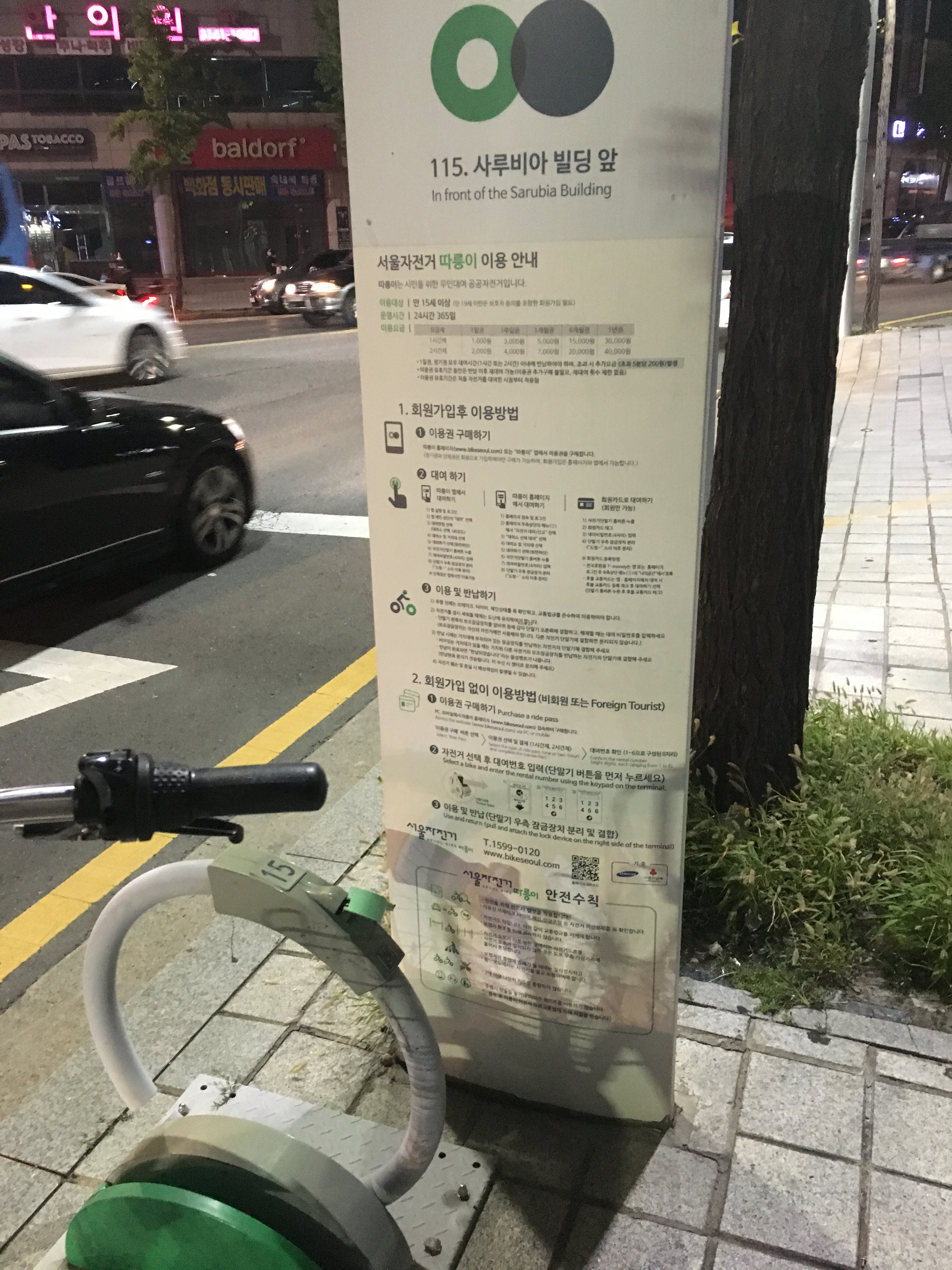
- Seoul Bike station in 2018

Overview
- Native name: Ddareungi (Korean: 따릉이)
- Locale: Seoul, South Korea
- Transit type: Bicycle-sharing system
- Website: bikeseoul.com

Operation
- Began operation: October 2015; 10 years ago
- Number of vehicles: 3000 (2016)

Ddareungi (Korean: 따릉이, the sound of a bicycle bell) is Seoul's bike sharing system, which was set up in 2015. It is also called Seoul Bike in English.

Ddareungi was first introduced in Seoul in October 2015 in select areas on the right bank of the Han River. After a few months, the number of stations reached 150 and 1500 bikes were made available. In 2016, the number of stations increased steadily to cover new districts. As of July 2016, there were about 300 stations and 3000 bikes available, and Seoul mayor Park Won-soon confirmed his intention to increase the number of bikes available to 20,000.

== History ==
The public bicycle rental service in Seoul was started in April 2000. At that time, rental facilities were established in the center of two subway stations in Chang-dong and Yeouido. In 2004, Songpa District was designated as a special bicycle district, and the bicycle-free rental service was operated mainly in the park. In 2008, a full-fledged unmanned service was launched at subway stations and the city.

In November 2007, Seoul announced its bicycle policy, introducing unmanned public bicycles such as Vélib' in Paris. The plan was to build 5102 bicycle stations at an interval of 300m within the bike-dedicated road network area and to have 82,400 bicycles. In October 2008, Seoul again announced the bicycle master plan and confirmed again that it intends to review the introduction of public rental bicycles by 2012. However, both of the presentations focused on the expansion of bicycle roads, and there was no progress in public bicycle rental service throughout the city. At the end of the year, the Seoul Facilities Corporation launched an unmanned rental service for the Cheonggyecheon.

In September 17, 2009, Mayor Oh Se-hoon, who traveled to Montreal, officially announced that he would introduce ‘a bicycle taxi (named at the time)’, a public bicycle system that can be used anywhere in Seoul, similar to Montreal's BIXI. He said, "It will be difficult to introduce it immediately, but it can be fully introduced after piloting in 2011 for the city's bicycle road construction plan."

Ddareungi "Transfer Miles": It is a service that accumulates mileage by using Ddareungi in 30 minutes before and after public transportation. However, it applies when Ttareung purchases a 365-day pass.
