= Sinansan Line =

Railway line in South Korea

Overview
- Native name: 신안산선(新安山線); Sinansan-seon
- Status: Under Construction
- Termini: Yeouido; Jungang (Songsan)
- Stations: 13 (17)

Service
- Type: Rapid transit
- System: Seoul Metropolitan Subway

History
- Planned opening: December 2026

Technical
- Line length: 46.9 km (29.1 mi)
- Number of tracks: 2

The Sinansan Line (Hangul: 신안산선, Hanja: 新安山線, meaning "New Ansan Line") is the tentative name of a commuter rail line that will eventually link Cheongnyangni station with western Gyeonggi province, passing through key areas of the Seoul metropolitan area, including Yeouido, Yeongdeungpo and Gwangmyeong station, scheduled to open in December 2026.

== Planning ==
The forerunner of the Sinansan Line was Line 10, proposed in 1994 as part of Seoul Metro's Phase 3 expansion but was mostly unbuilt due to the 1997 Asian financial crisis. Originally Line 10 was also planned to extend east beyond downtown Seoul going through either Sinchon, Dongnimmun and Hyehwa or pass through Gongdeok, Seoul Station and Dongdaemun Stadium. However, following the restoration of the Cheonggye Stream, under which Line 10 was planned to be laid, the former route seems much more likely.

The Sinansan Line underwent many design changes during planning stages, but generally the line was envisioned to run between Sinpung and Gwangmyeong station. In particular, the section south of Gwangmyeong station has led to heated disputes between the cities of Ansan and Siheung. Ansan has requested for the line to be built almost perfectly south from Gwangmyeong station so it terminates at Hanyang University ERICA Campus, passing through Seongpo-dong on the way (that station should not be confused with the existing Hanyang University at Ansan station). This would also open the possibilities for the trains on this line to travel to Suwon via the Suin Line. The consortium behind the construction of the Sin Ansan Line, however, favors a line running southwest from Gwangmyeong station and joining the Sosa-Wonsi Line, transferring with Line 4 and the Suin Line at Choji station and terminating at southwestern Ansan. The city of Siheung proposed the section in dispute does not even pass through the city of Ansan at all, making the name "Sinansan Line" meaningless. The Siheung plan has the section go west from Gwangmyeong station, intersect the Sosa-Wonsi Line at Siheung City Hall, and terminating at Wolgot station.

Construction was planned to begin in 2015 with the first section of this line (Gwangmyeong station - Yeouido) is set to be opened in 2023. However, contract disputes between the Ministry of Land, Transport and Maritime Affairs and the preferred operator delayed the project and lead to a retendering.

Construction of Phase 1 (Yeouido to Hanyang University/Songsan stations) began 2019 September 9.

== History ==
- 2007 June 7: Feasibility Study Announcement
- 2007 June 5: The Primary Route Announced
- 2008 March 20: Second Route Announced
- 2009 November 3: Confirmed Gwangmyeong Southern Section Final Route
- 2010 December 15: Master Plan Presented

== Accidents ==
On April 11, 2025, a construction site of the line in Gwangmyeong collapsed, trapping two construction workers inside. Authorities have ordered evacuations for nearby residents. One was rescued on the next day while another was found dead after five days of searching.

== Stations ==
NOTE: The Ministry of Land, Transport and Maritime Affairs announced the station list on December 15, 2010, routes are finally announced on 2015.

Station; Number	Station Name; English	Station Name; Hangul	Station Name; Hanja	EX	Transfer	Station Type	Location	
	Seoul Station (planned)	서울	-驛		Gyeongui–Jungang Line	Underground	Seoul	Jung-gu
	Gongdeok (planned)	공덕	孔德		Gyeongui–Jungang Line	Underground	Seoul	Mapo-gu
	Yeouido (under construction)	여의도	汝矣島	●	Seoul Subway Line 5 Seoul Subway Line 9	Underground	Seoul	Yeongdeungpo-gu
	Yeongdeungpo (under construction)	영등포	永登浦	●	Seoul Subway Line 1	Underground	Seoul	Yeongdeungpo-gu
	Dorimsageori (under construction)	도림사거리	道林사거리	|		Underground	Seoul	Yeongdeungpo-gu
	Sinpung (under construction)	신풍	新豊	●	Seoul Subway Line 7	Underground	Seoul	Yeongdeungpo-gu
	Daerimsamgeori (under construction)	대림삼거리	大林삼거리	|		Underground	Seoul	Guro-gu
	Guro Digital Complex (under construction)	구로디지털단지	九老디지털團地	●	Seoul Subway Line 2	Underground	Seoul	Guro-gu
	Sindoksan (under construction)	신독산	新禿山	|		Underground	Seoul	Geumcheon-gu
	Siheungsageori (under construction)	시흥사거리	始興사거리	|		Underground	Seoul	Geumcheon-gu
	Seoksu (under construction)	석수	石水	●	Seoul Subway Line 1	Underground	Seoul	Geumcheon-gu
	Gwangmyeong (under construction)	광명	光明	●	KTX Gyeongbu, Honam & Gwangmyeong Shuttle (2026)	Underground	Gyeonggi-do	Gwangmyeong-si
	Mokgam (under construction)	목감	牧甘	|		Underground	Gyeonggi-do	Siheung-si
	Seongpo (under construction)	성포	聲浦	|		Underground	Gyeonggi-do	Ansan-si
	Jungang (under construction)	중앙	中央	●	Suin–Bundang Line	Underground	Gyeonggi-do	Ansan-si
	Hosu (under construction)	호수	湖水	|		Underground	Gyeonggi-do	Ansan-si
	Hanyang University ERICA Campus (under construction)	한양대에리카캠퍼스	漢陽大에리카캠퍼스	●		Underground	Gyeonggi-do	Ansan-si

=== Siheung Branch Line (planned) ===
Station Number	Station Name; English	Station Name; Hangul	Station Name; Hanja	Transfer	Station Type	Location	
	Gwangmyeong (planned)	광명	光明	KTX Gyeongbu, Honam & via Gwangmyeong Shuttle (2026)	Underground	Gyeonggi-do	Gwangmyeong-si
	Maehwa	매화	梅花	(2026)	Underground	Gyeonggi-do	Siheung-si
	Siheung City Hall (planned)	시흥시청	始興市廳	(2026)	Underground	Gyeonggi-do	Siheung-si
	Seonbu (planned)	선부	仙府	Seohae Line	Underground	Gyeonggi-do	Ansan-si
	Choji (planned)	초지	草芝	, &	Underground	Gyeonggi-do	Ansan-si
	Siu (planned)	시우	時雨	Seohae Line	Underground	Gyeonggi-do	Ansan-si
	Wonsi (planned)	원시	元時	Seohae Line	Underground	Gyeonggi-do	Ansan-si
	USKR (planned)	USKR	USKR		Aboveground	Gyeonggi-do	Hwaseong-si
	Songsan (planned)	송산	松山		Aboveground	Gyeonggi-do	Hwaseong-si
