= Dalmi station =

Metro station in Ansan, South Korea

달미; Dalmi
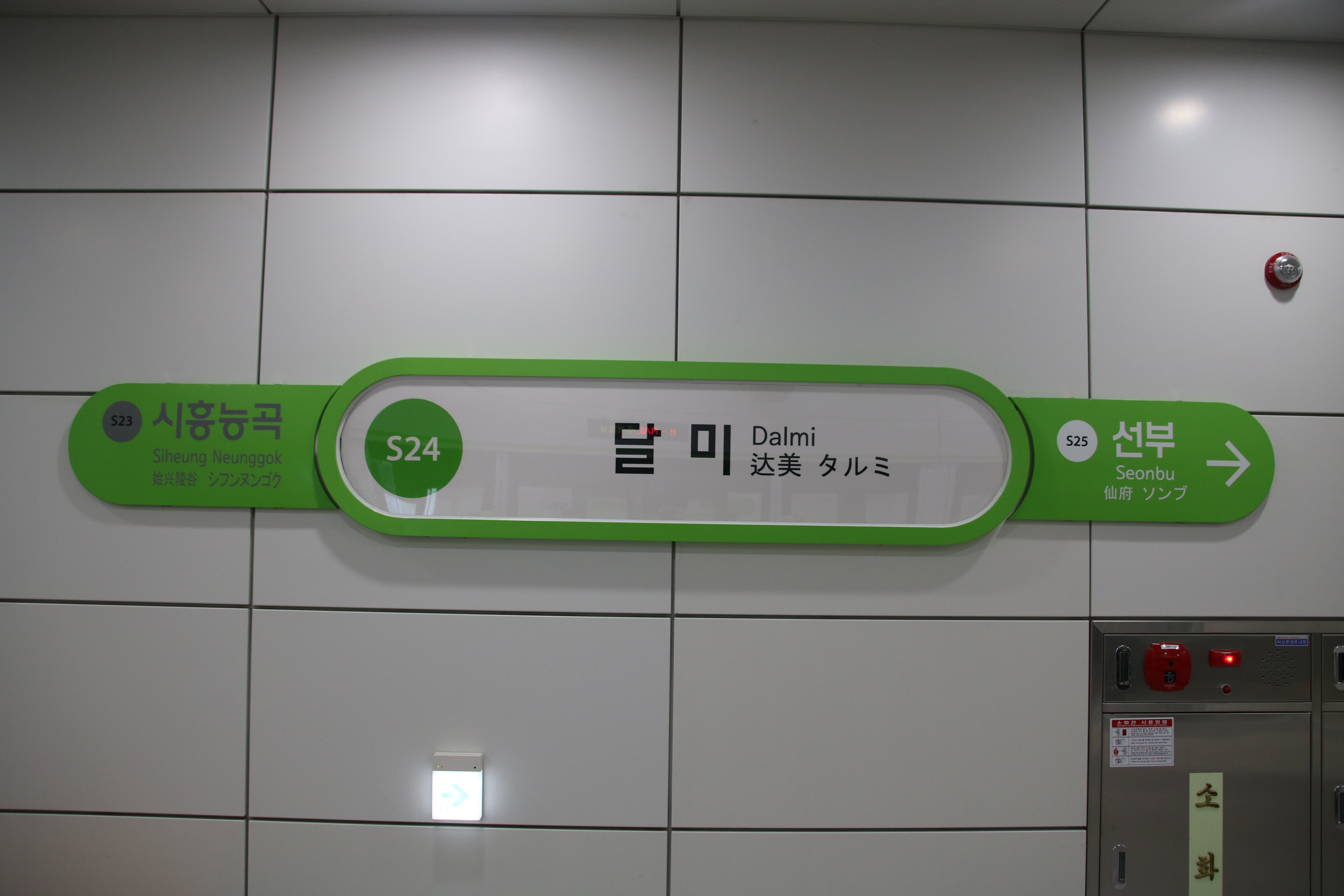

Korean name
- Hangul: 달미역
- Hanja: 달미驛
- Revised Romanization: Dalmi-yeok
- McCune–Reischauer: Talmi-yŏk

General information
- Location: Ansan, Gyeonggi-do
- Coordinates: 37°20′56″N 126°48′33″E
- Operated by: Korail; SEO HAE RAIL CO., LTD.
- Line: Seohae Line
- Platforms: 2 (2 side platforms)
- Tracks: 2

Construction
- Structure type: Underground

History
- Opened: June 16, 2018

Services
Preceding station	Seoul Metropolitan Subway	Following station
Siheung Neunggok towards Ilsan	Seohae Line	Seonbu towards Wonsi
Location

Dalmi Station is a railway station on the Seohae Line of the Seoul Metropolitan Subway, located in Seonbu-dong, Danwon-gu, Ansan, Gyeonggi Province, South Korea.

== Name origin ==
The station is named after the village Dalmi that once existed in Seonbu-dong, Danwon-gu, Ansan. The name means “a place well connected in all directions,” and it was also called "Dalsan (達山)" during the mid-Joseon period. Administratively, it belonged to Dalsan-ri, Daewol-myeon, Ansan-gun, Gyeonggi Province. The syllable "mi" is a variation of the word "moe" (mountain).

== History ==
- October 21, 2013: Station initially designated as Seoksugol Station in government railway line notice.
- April 6, 2018: Name officially changed to Dalmi Station.
- June 16, 2018: Opened with the inauguration of the Seohae Line.

== Station layout ==
The station has a structure similar to Noksapyeong station on Seoul Subway Line 6, with a large central atrium and skylight dome.

=== Platforms ===
Dalmi station has two side platforms serving two tracks. Screen doors are installed on all platforms.

↑ Siheung Neunggok
Seonbu ↓

1	●	Towards Ilsan / Daegok / Gimpo Airport / Sosa / Siheung City Hall
2	●	Towards Wonsi / Choji

== Surroundings ==
- Kyungil Tourism Business High School
- Seoksu Elementary School
- Seonbu Middle School
- Hwajeong Elementary School
- Seonbu 3-dong Community Service Center
- Korea Road Traffic Authority Ansan Driver’s License Test Center
- Ansan Seoksu Elementary School
- Seoksu Middle School
- Ansan First General Market
- Jeongji Elementary School
- Ansan Metro Town Prugio Hillstate Apartments

== Gallery ==
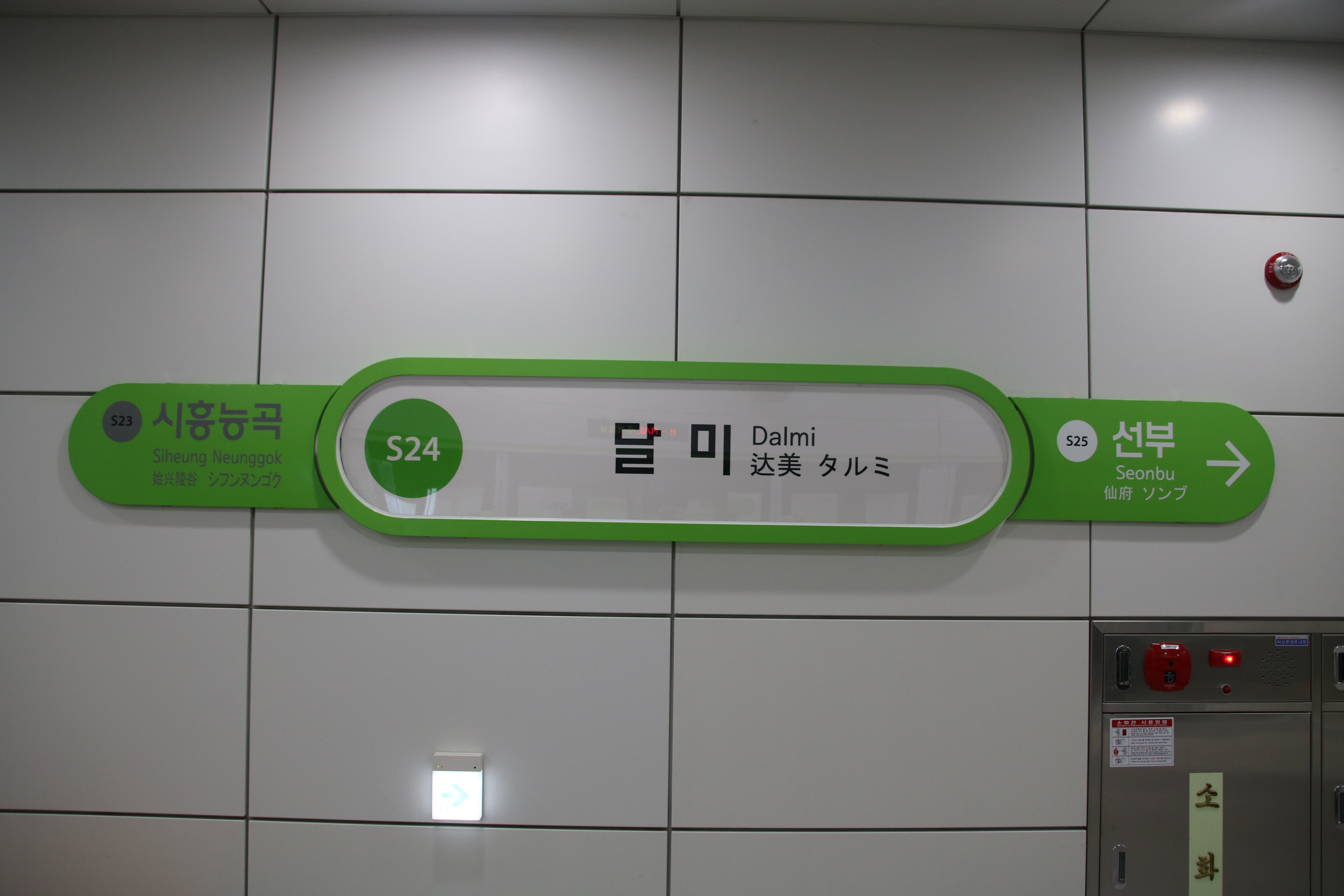
Station sign

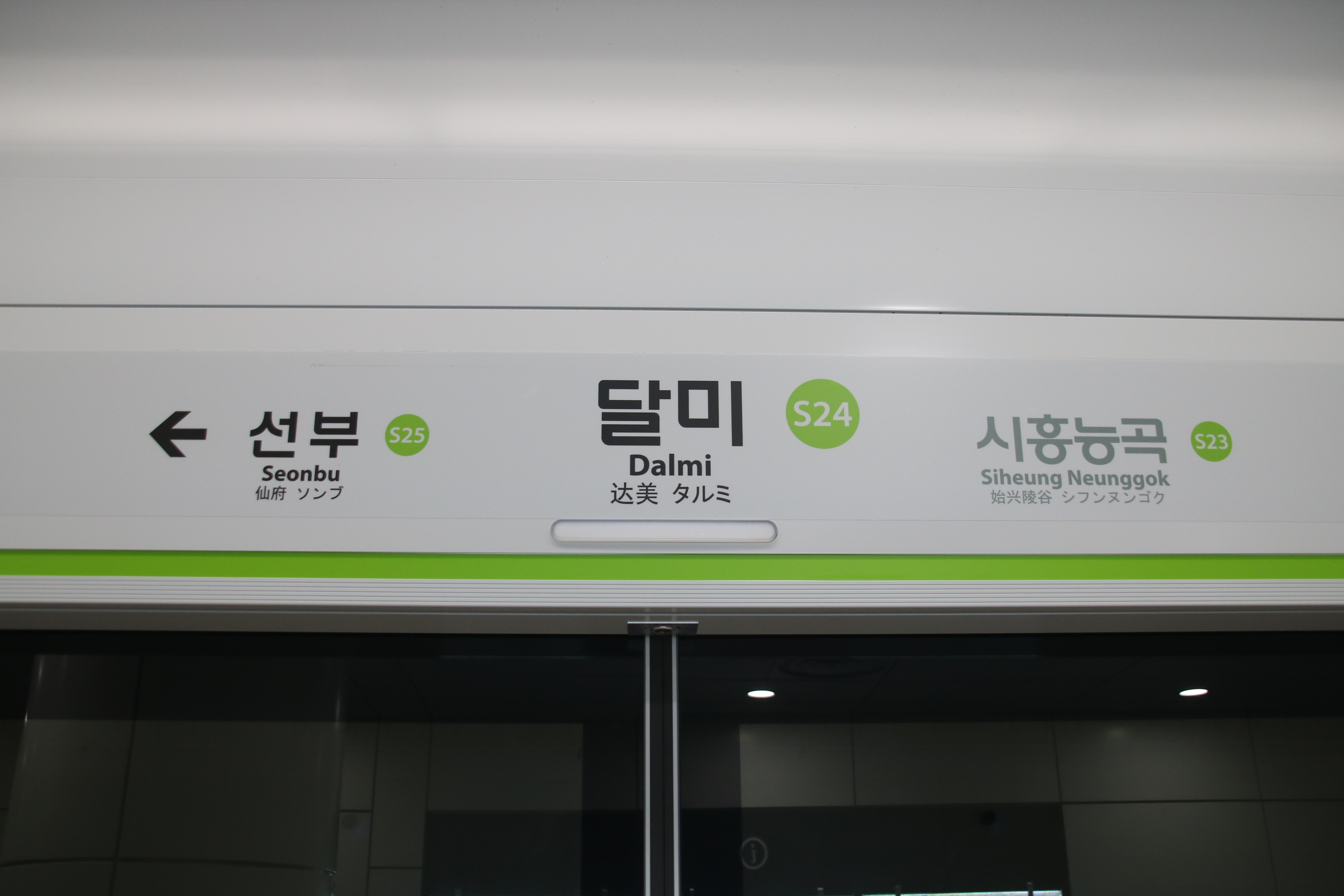
Platform screen doors

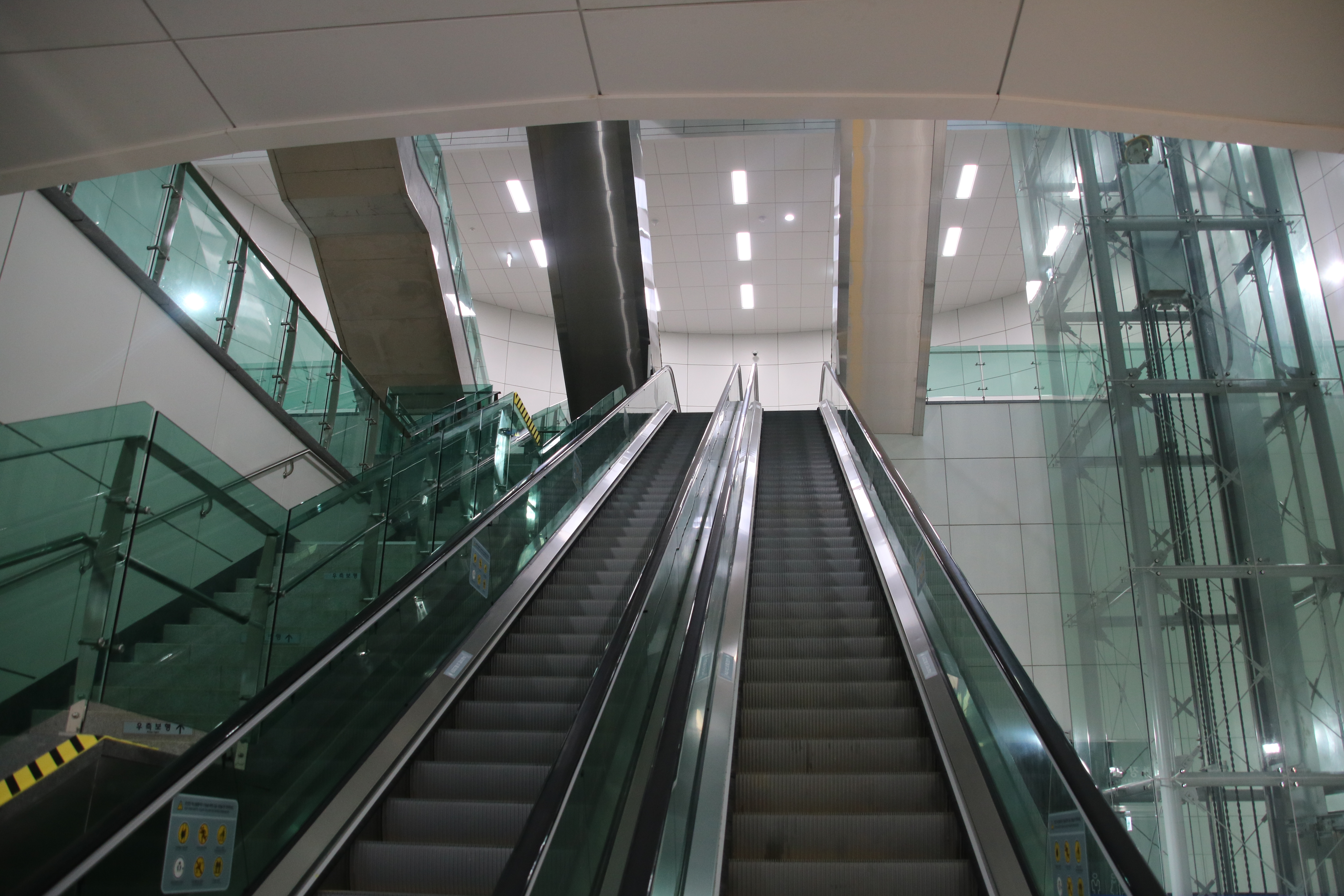
Escalator inside station

== Ridership ==
Line	Average daily ridership (passengers/day)					Source
Line	2018	2019	2020	2021	2022	Source
Seohae Line	1,570	2,518	2,058	1,217	1,394	
