= Daerim station =

Train station in Seoul, South Korea

Coordinates: 37°29′36″N 126°53′42″E

| 대림 (구로구청); Daerim (Guro-gu Office) |
| 대림 (구로구청); Daerim (Guro-gu Office) |
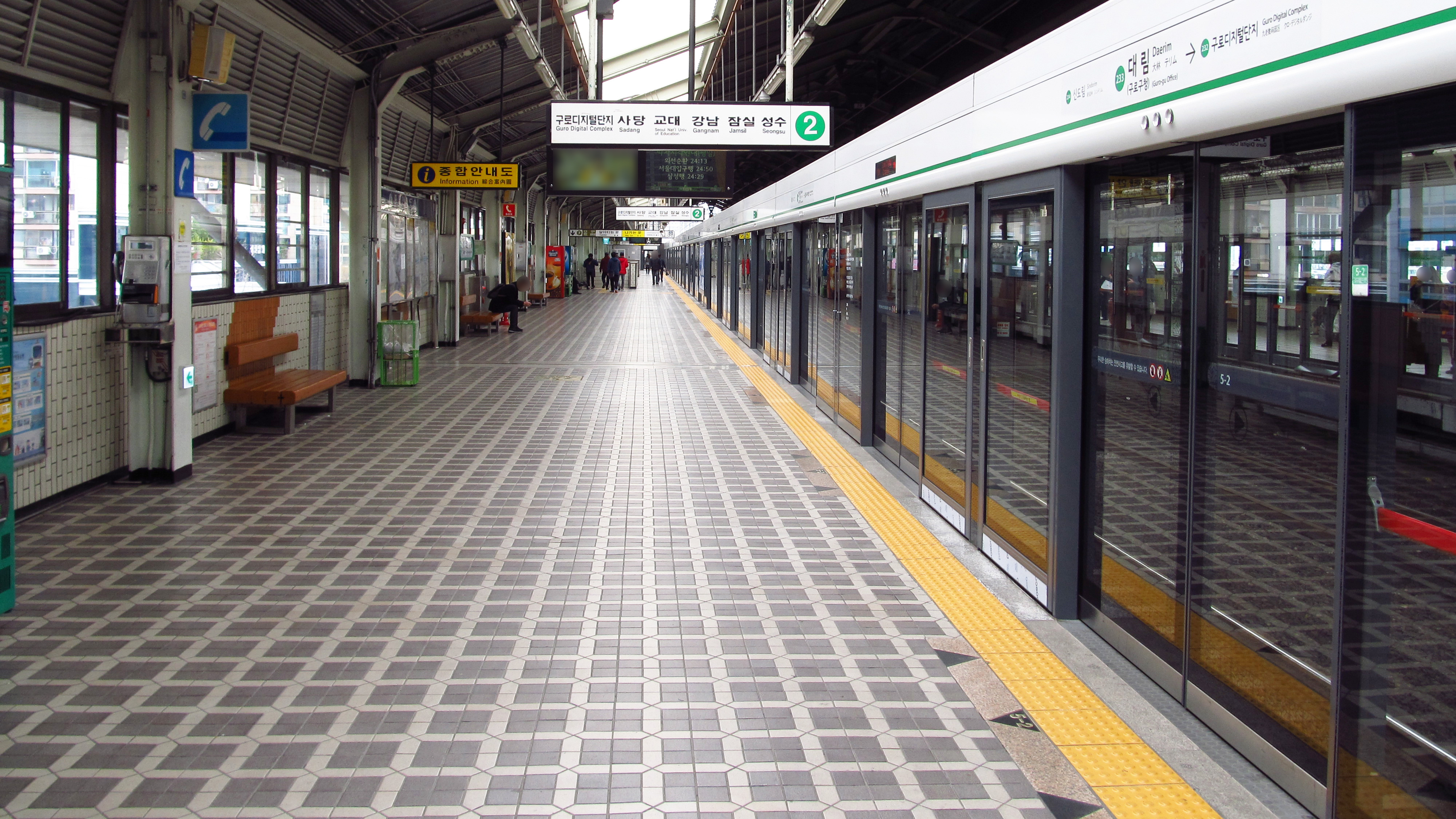
- Line 2 platform

Korean name
- Hangul: 대림역
- Hanja: 大林驛
- RR: Daerim-yeok
- MR: Taerim-yŏk

General information
- Location: 351 Dorimcheon-ro, 1204 Guro-dong, Guro-gu, Seoul
- Operator: Seoul Metro
- Lines: Line 2 Line 7
- Platforms: 4
- Tracks: 4

Construction
- Structure type: Aboveground; Underground

History
- Opened: May 22, 1984; February 29, 2000

Passengers
- (Daily) Based on Jan-Dec of 2012. Line 2: 64,015; Line 7: 19,413

Services
| Preceding station | Seoul Metropolitan Subway | Following station |
|---|---|---|
| Guro Digital Complex Next counterclockwise | Line 2 | Sindorim Next clockwise |
| Sinpung towards Jangam | Line 7 | Namguro towards Seongnam |
Location

Daerim station (Korean: 대림역) is a station on the Seoul Subway Line 2 and Line 7. The station is located just south of the Han River in Yeongdeungpo District. The Line 2 station is elevated, while the Line 7 station is underground.

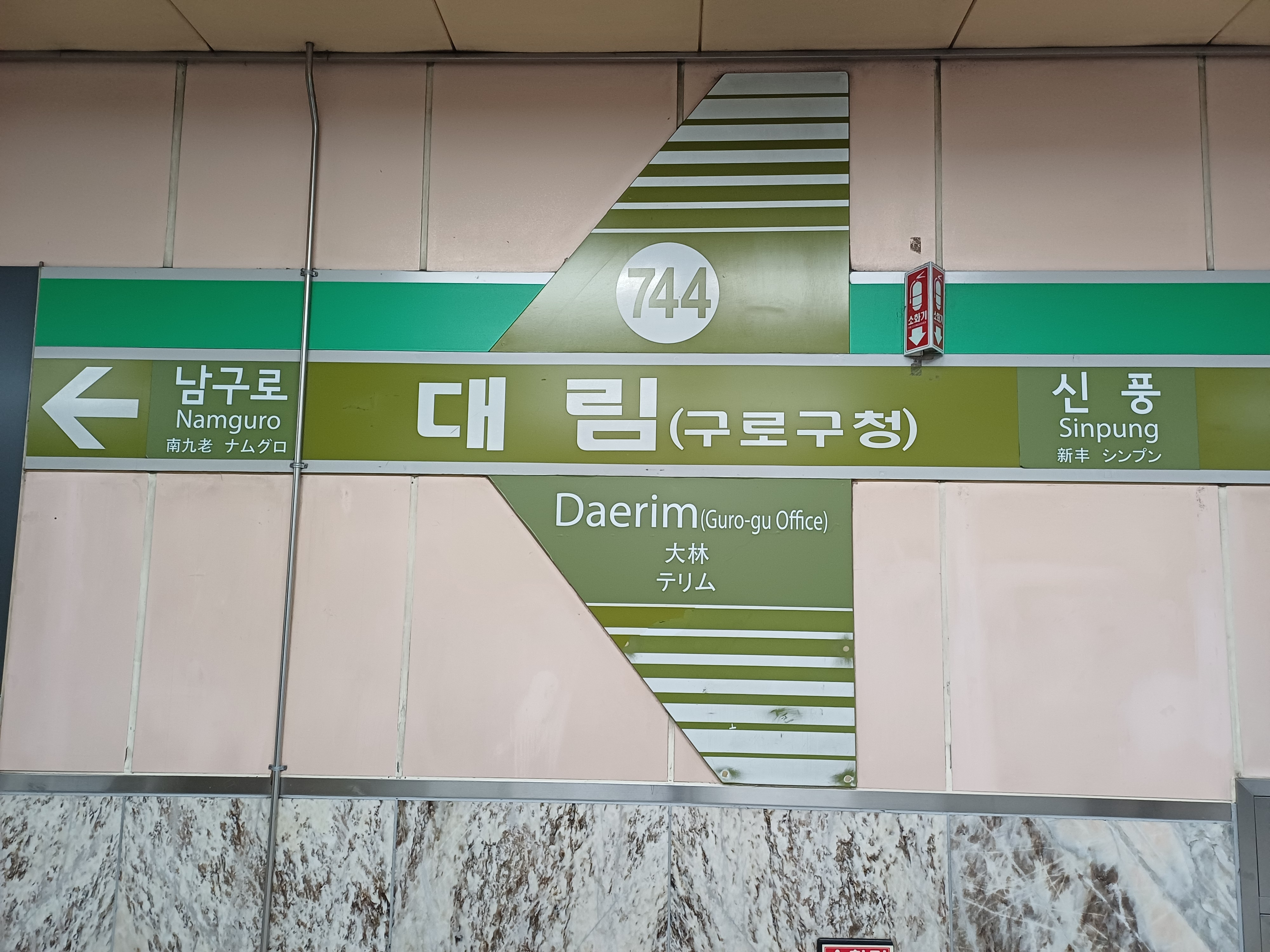
Line 7 station sign (2026)

== Station layout ==
=== Line 2 ===
Sindorim ↑
Outer | | Inner
↓ Guro Digital Complex

| Inner circle | ← ● Line 2 Next clockwise |
| Outer circle | ● Line 2 Next counterclockwise → |

=== Line 7 ===
Sinpung ↑
S/B | | N/B
↓ Namguro

| Southbound | ← ● Line 7 toward Seongnam |
| Northbound | ● Line 7 toward Jangam → |
