= Namguro station =

Train station in Seoul, South Korea

Coordinates: 37°29′10″N 126°53′14″E

남구로; Namguro
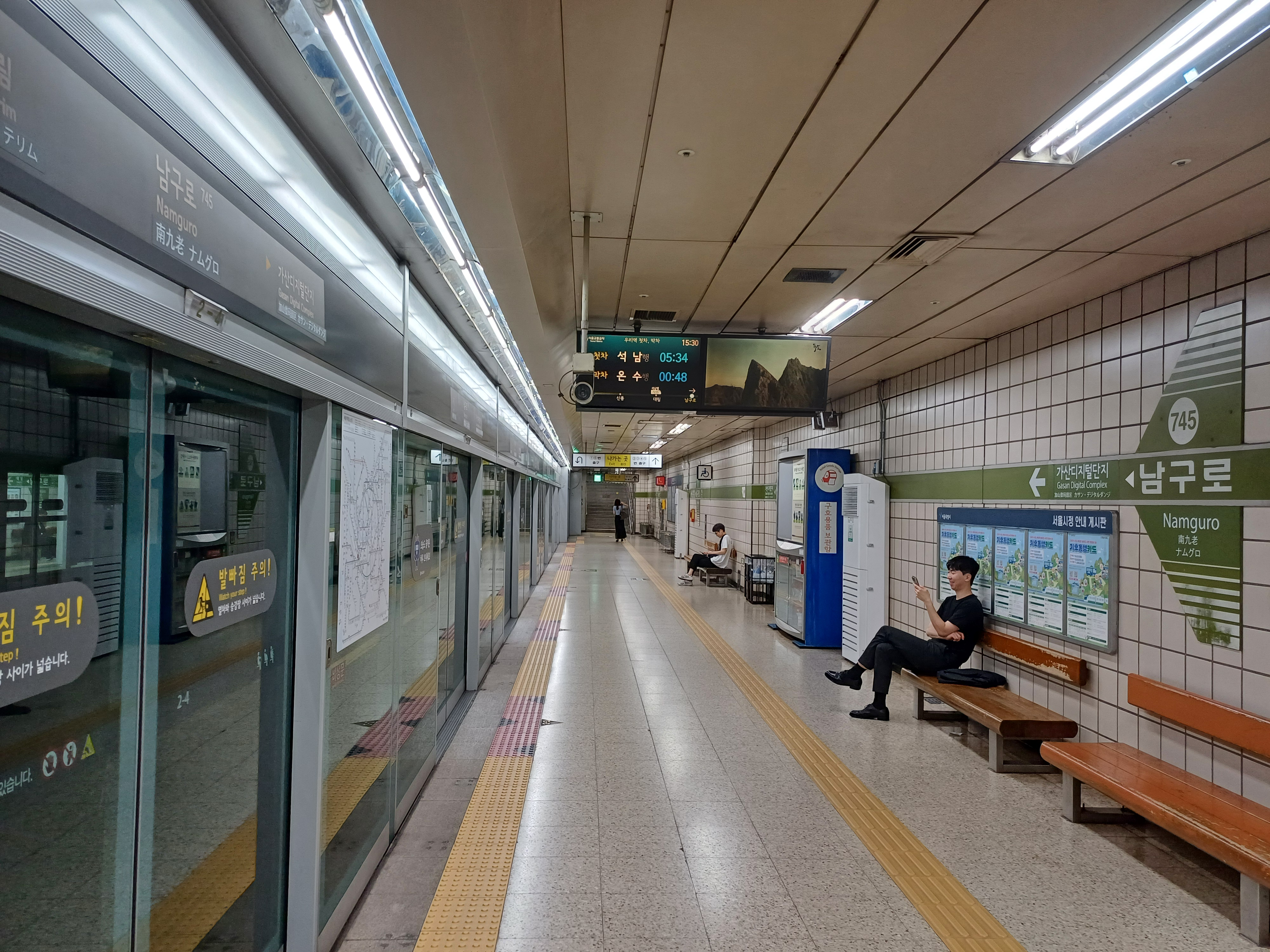

Korean name
- Hangul: 남구로역
- Hanja: 南九老驛
- Revised Romanization: Namguro-yeok
- McCune–Reischauer: Namguro-yŏk

General information
- Location: 801-95 Guro-dong, 7 Dorimno Jiha, Guro-gu, Seoul
- Operator: Seoul Metro
- Line: Line 7
- Platforms: 2
- Tracks: 2

Construction
- Structure type: Underground

Key dates
- February 29, 2000: Line 7 opened
Location

Namguro Station is a station on the Seoul Subway Line 7. The station was named because this station is located in the southern part of the Guro neighborhood. Namguro Station opened on February 29, 2000. In the vicinity of Namguro Station, there are Guro General Social Welfare Center, Garibong-dong Residents Center and Guro 2/4 Residents Center.

== Station layout ==
Daerim ↑
S/B | | N/B
↓ Gasan Digital Complex

Southbound	← ● Line 7 toward Seongnam
Northbound	● Line 7 toward Jangam →

== Vicinity ==
- Exit 1: Samsung Raemian APT
- Exit 2: Guronam Elementary School
- Exit 3: Garibong-dong
- Exit 4: Youngil Elementary School
- Exit 5: Guro Market
- Exit 6: Doosan APT

Preceding station	Seoul Metropolitan Subway	Following station
Daerim towards Jangam	Line 7	Gasan Digital Complex towards Seongnam
