= Guro Digital Complex station =

Train station in South Korea

Coordinates: 37°29′07″N 126°54′05″E

구로디지털단지; Guro Digital Complex
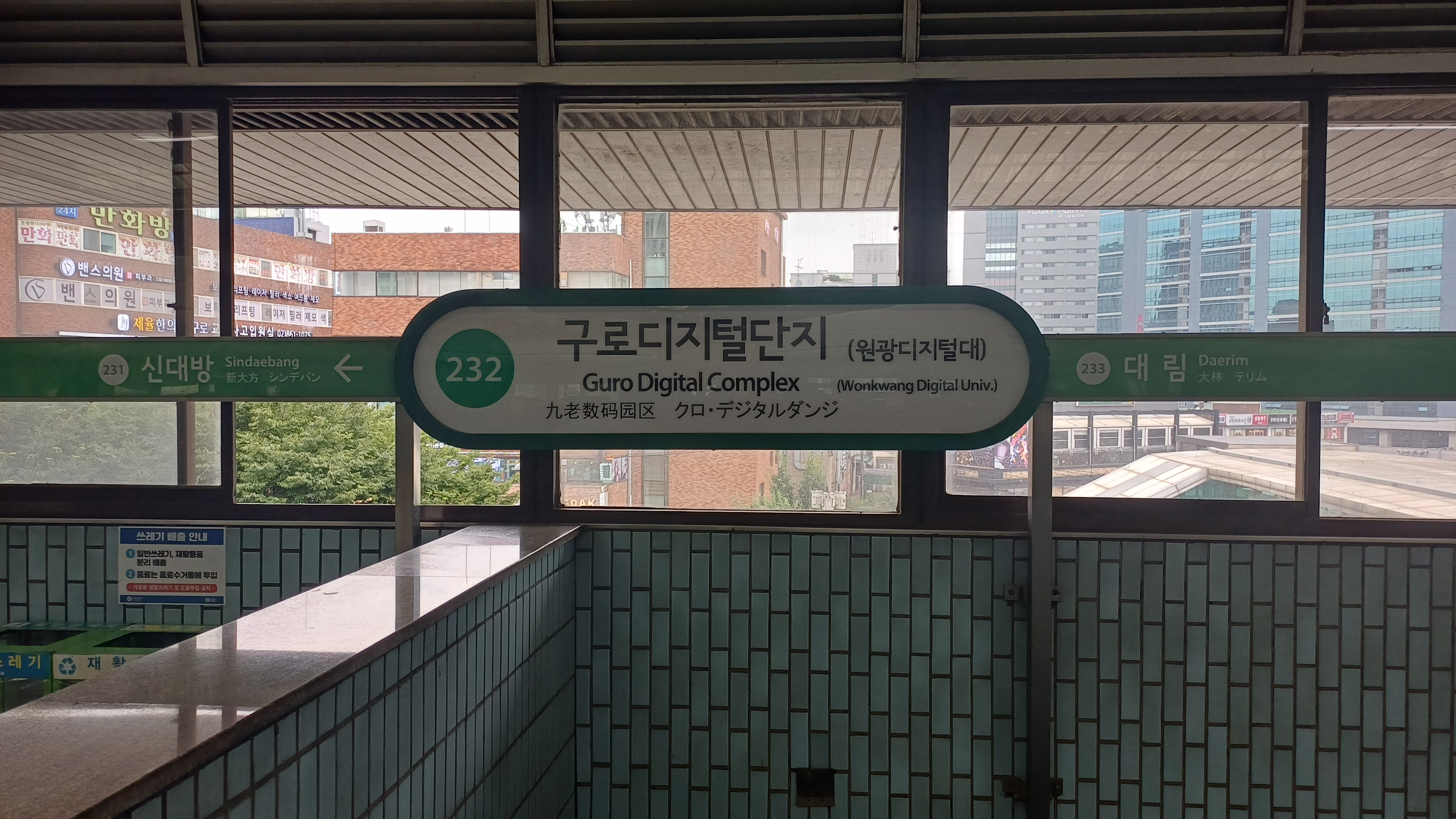
- Station sign in July 2025

Korean name
- Hangul: 구로디지털단지역
- Hanja: 九老디지털團地驛
- Revised Romanization: Gurodijiteoldanji-yeok
- McCune–Reischauer: Kurodijit'ŏldanji-yŏk

General information
- Location: 477, Dorimcheon-ro, 810-3 Guro-dong, Guro-gu, Seoul
- Operator: Seoul Metro
- Line: Line 2
- Platforms: 2
- Tracks: 2

Construction
- Structure type: Aboveground

Key dates
- May 22, 1984: Line 2 opened

Passengers
- (Daily) Based on Jan-Dec 2012. Line 2: 124,205

Services
Preceding station	Seoul Metropolitan Subway	Following station
Sindaebang Next counterclockwise	Line 2	Daerim Next clockwise
Location

Guro Digital Complex Station (Korean: 구로디지털단지역) is a station on the Seoul Subway Line 2. This station will also become a station on the Sin Ansan Line in the future.

When the Shinansan Line opens in the future, it will be a transfer station. The station is located at the intersection of Guro District, Yeongdeungpo District, Dongjak District and Gwanak District, and in 2009, Guro Digital Complex Station was selected as the bus stop in Seoul with the largest number of bus users.

The area nearby was used as a filming location for several Korean films, including The Yellow Sea by Na Hong-jin.

== Station layout ==
L2; Platform level	Side platform, doors will open on the right
L2; Platform level	Inner circle	← Line 2 Next clockwise (Daerim)
L2; Platform level	Outer circle	Line 2 Next counterclockwise (Sindaebang) →
L2; Platform level	Side platform, doors will open on the right

L1; Concourse	Lobby	Customer Service, Shops, Vending machines, ATMs

G	Street level	Exit
