= Siheung Neunggok station =

Train station in South Korea

시흥능곡; Siheung Neunggok
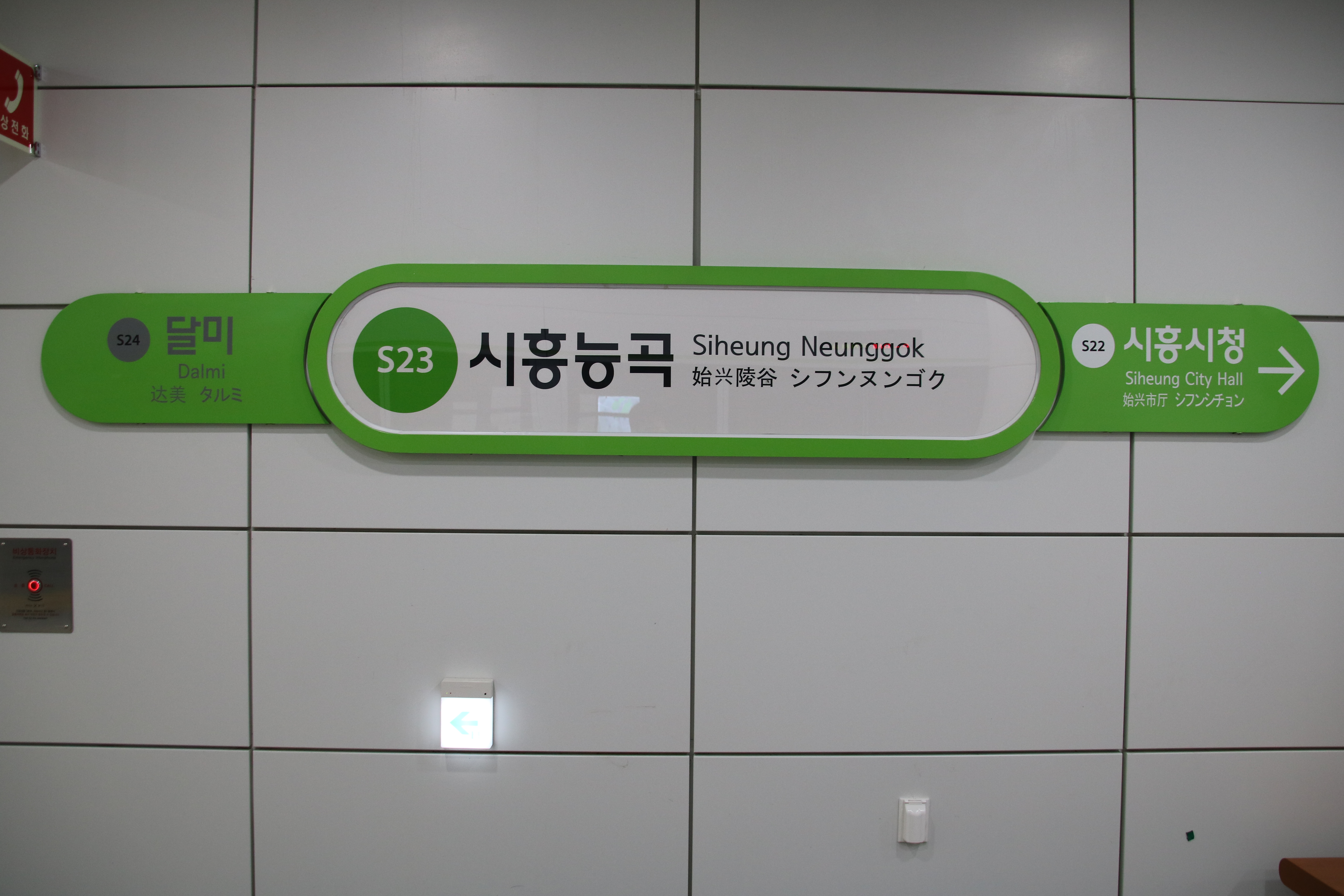
- Station nameplate

Korean name
- Hangul: 시흥능곡역
- Hanja: 始興陵谷驛
- Revised Romanization: Siheungneunggok-yeok
- McCune–Reischauer: Sihŭngnŭnggok-yŏk

General information
- Location: Siheung, Gyeonggi-do
- Coordinates: 37°22′12.5″N 126°48′32.0″E
- Operator: Korail; SEO HAE RAIL CO., LTD.
- Line: Seohae Line
- Platforms: 2 (2 side platforms)
- Tracks: 2

Construction
- Structure type: Underground

History
- Opened: June 16, 2018
Location

Siheung Neunggok station is a station on the Seohae Line in South Korea. It opened on June 16, 2018.

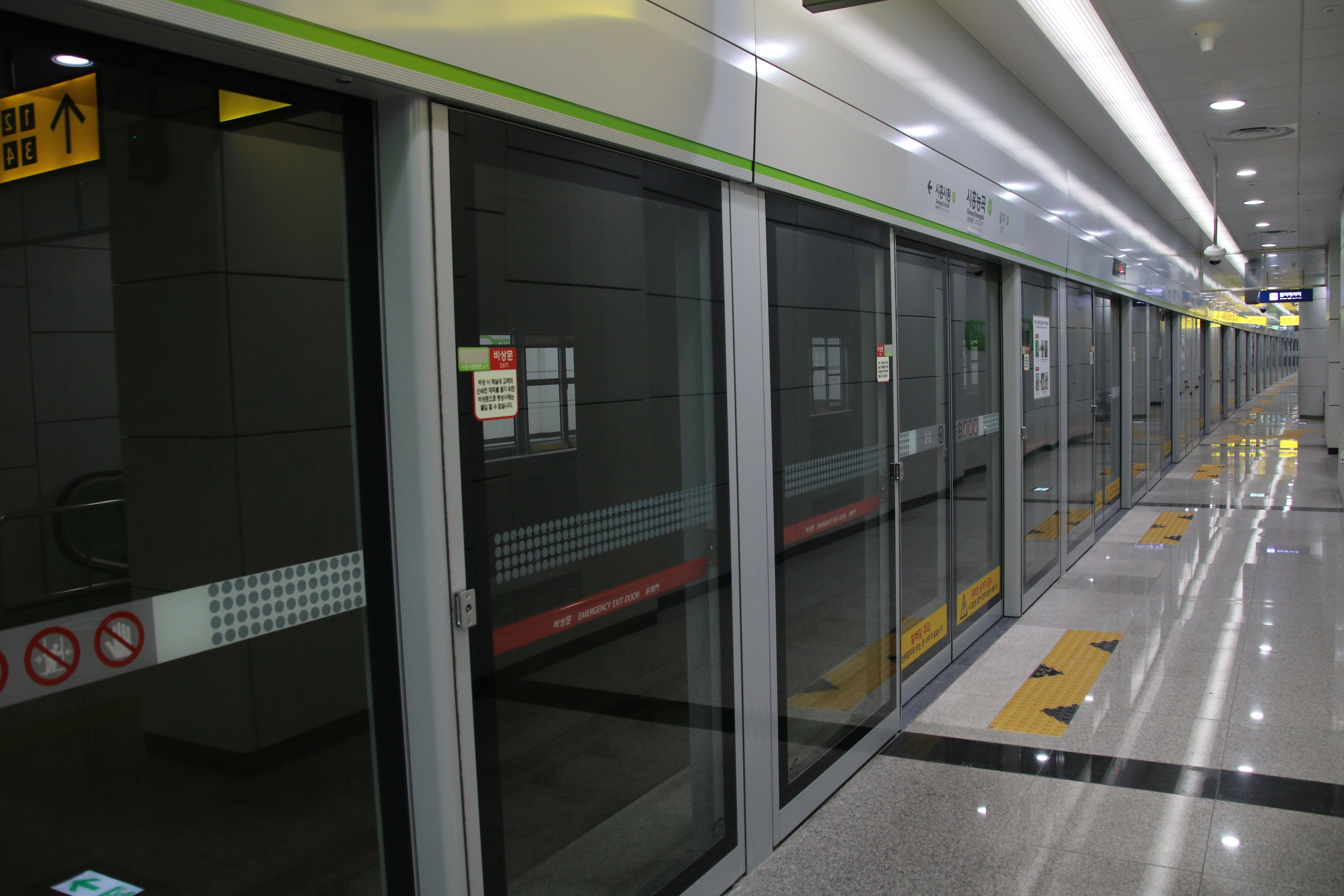
Station platform

Preceding station	Seoul Metropolitan Subway	Following station
Siheung City Hall towards Ilsan	Seohae Line	Dalmi towards Wonsi
