= Ansan Wa~ Stadium =

Stadium in Ansan, South Korea

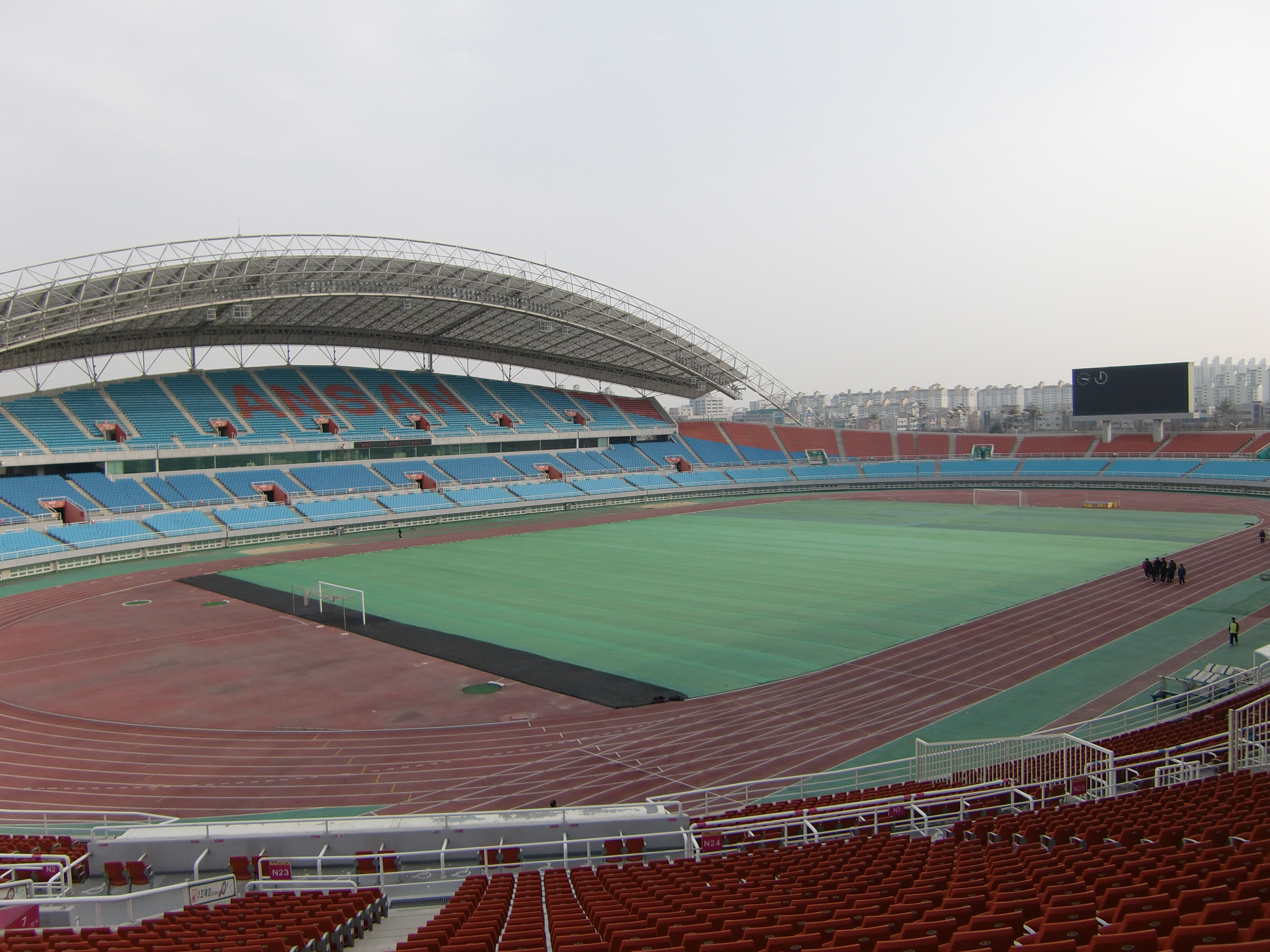
- The inside of Wa~ stadium
- Interactive map of Ansan Wa~ Stadium
- Location: Ansan, Gyeonggi Province, South Korea
- Coordinates: 37.319364°N 126.818619°E
- Operator: Local facilities management corporation of Ansan
- Capacity: 35,000
- Surface: Natural lawn
- Public transit: Gojan Station

Construction
- Built: 2003
- Opened: March 28, 2007
- Cost: 1,128 million won

Tenants
- Ansan H FC (2007–2012); Ansan Mugunghwa FC (2014–2016); Ansan Greeners FC (2017–present)

Website
- wa.ansaneco.net

Ansan Wa~ Stadium (Korean: 안산 와~ 스타디움) is a multi-purpose stadium in Ansan, Gyeonggi Province, South Korea. It's currently served as home stadium for Ansan Greeners FC. The stadium was opened in 2007 and has a capacity of 35,000 people. It is used mostly for football matches and athletics. It is located next to Gojan Station on Seoul Subway Line 4. Also, there are some restaurants at the 1st floor.

While under construction it was known as "Ansan Stadium". After the public subscription during the construction, the formal name "Ansan Wa~ Stadium" was selected. "Wa" means harmonious cheering and the wave notation (~) represents the extension of that sound. 2013 HSBC Asian Five Nations rugby union game was held in the stadium.
