= Sinpung station =

Station of the Seoul Metropolitan Subway

신풍; Sinpung
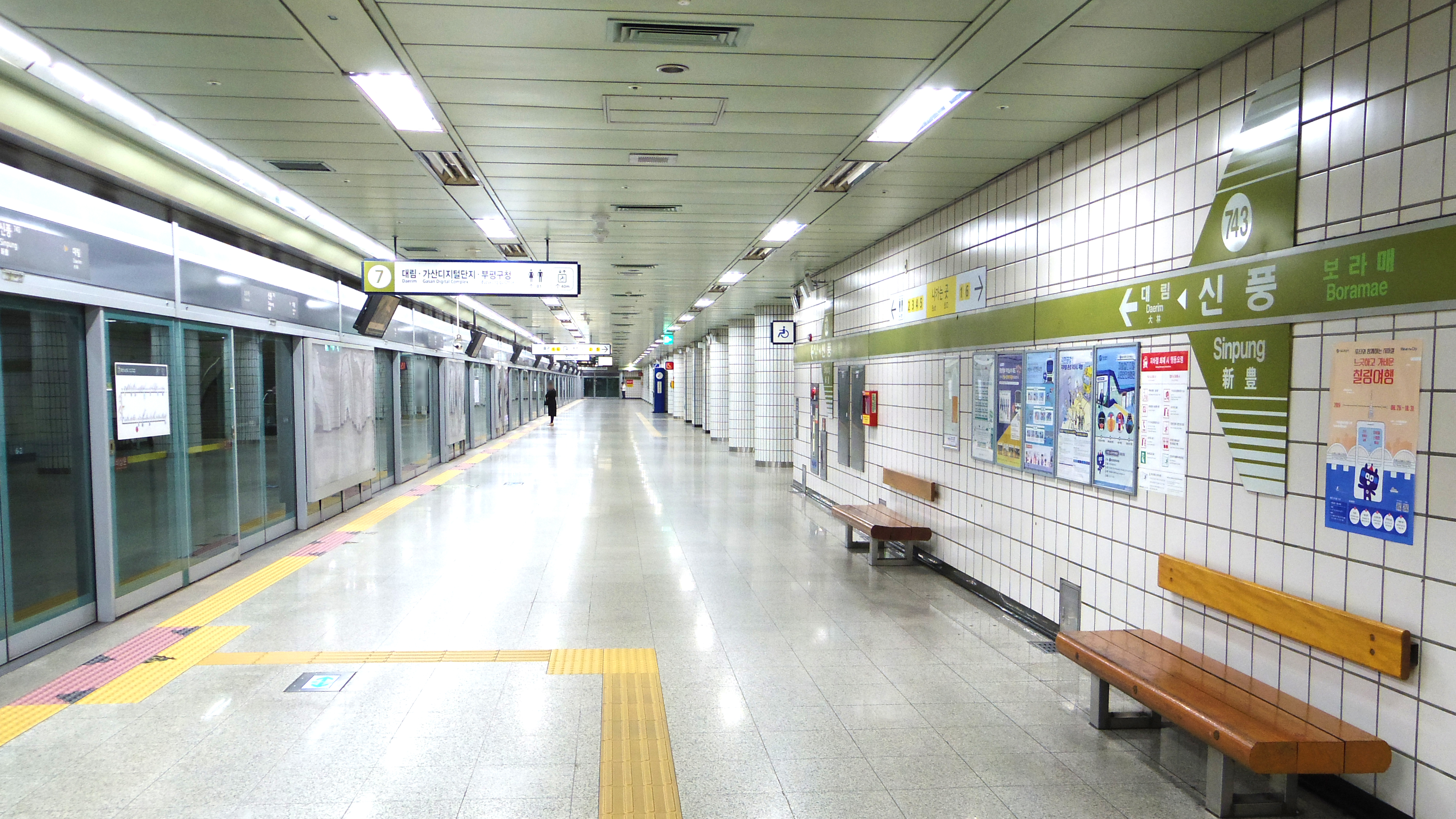

Korean name
- Hangul: 신풍역
- Hanja: 新豊驛
- Revised Romanization: Sinpungnyeok
- McCune–Reischauer: Sinp'ungnyŏk

General information
- Location: 3576-1 Singil 6-dong, 27 Sinpungno, Yeongdeungpo-gu, Seoul
- Coordinates: 37°30′00″N 126°54′36″E
- Operated by: Seoul Metro
- Line(s): Line 7
- Platforms: 2
- Tracks: 2

Construction
- Structure type: Underground

Key dates
- February 29, 2000: Line 7 opened

Sinpung Station is a station on Seoul Subway Line 7. It will also most likely become a station on the Sinansan Line in the future.

== Station layout ==
Boramae ↑
| N/B
↓ Daerim

Southbound	← ● Line 7 toward Seongnam
Northbound	● Line 7 toward Jangam →

Preceding station	Seoul Metropolitan Subway	Following station
Boramae towards Jangam	Line 7	Daerim towards Seongnam
