= Gojan station =

Metro station in Ansan, South Korea

Coordinates: 37°19′0.54″N 126°49′23.26″E

고잔 (고대안산병원); Gojan (Korea Univ. Ansan Hospital)
고잔 (고대안산병원); Gojan (Korea Univ. Ansan Hospital)
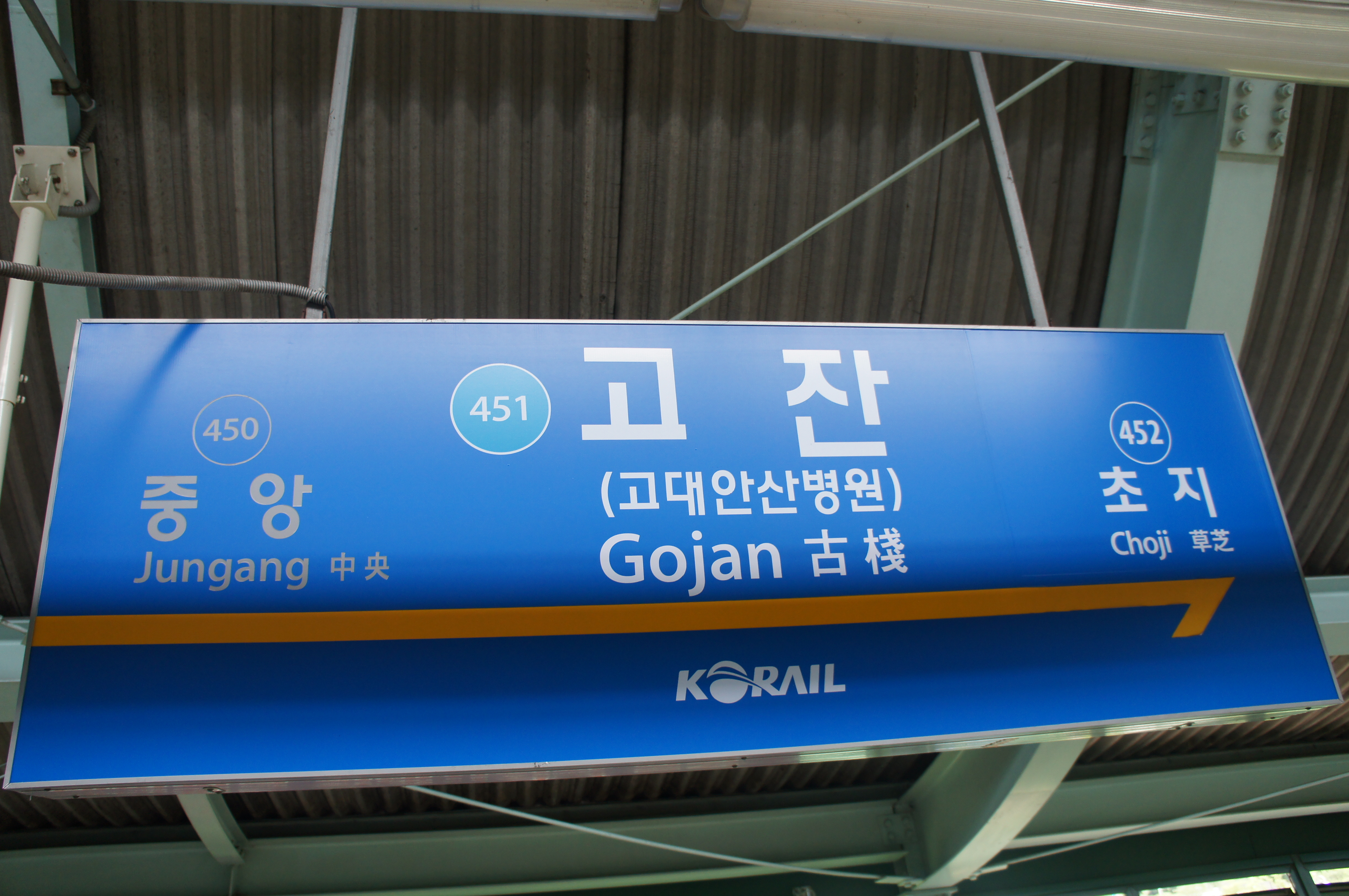
- Station nameplate

Korean name
- Hangul: 고잔역
- Hanja: 古棧驛
- RR: Gojan-yeok
- MR: Kojan-yŏk

General information
- Location: 453-53 Gojan-dong, 784 Jungangdaero, Danwon-gu, Ansan-si, Gyeonggi-do
- Operator: Korail
- Lines: Line 4 Suin–Bundang Line
- Platforms: 2
- Tracks: 2

Construction
- Structure type: Aboveground

History
- Opened: August 6, 1937; March 2, 1992 (as part of Line 1)

Key dates
- April 1, 1992: Line 1 service transferred to Line 4
- September 12, 2020: Suin–Bundang Line opened
Location

Gojan station (Korean: 고잔역) is a commuter train station on Seoul Subway Line 4 and the Suin–Bundang Line in Ansan, Korea. It is the closest station to Ansan Wa~ Stadium. Its station subname is Korea Univ. Ansan Hospital, as it is located nearby the station. The word "Gojan" originated as "inside of cape".

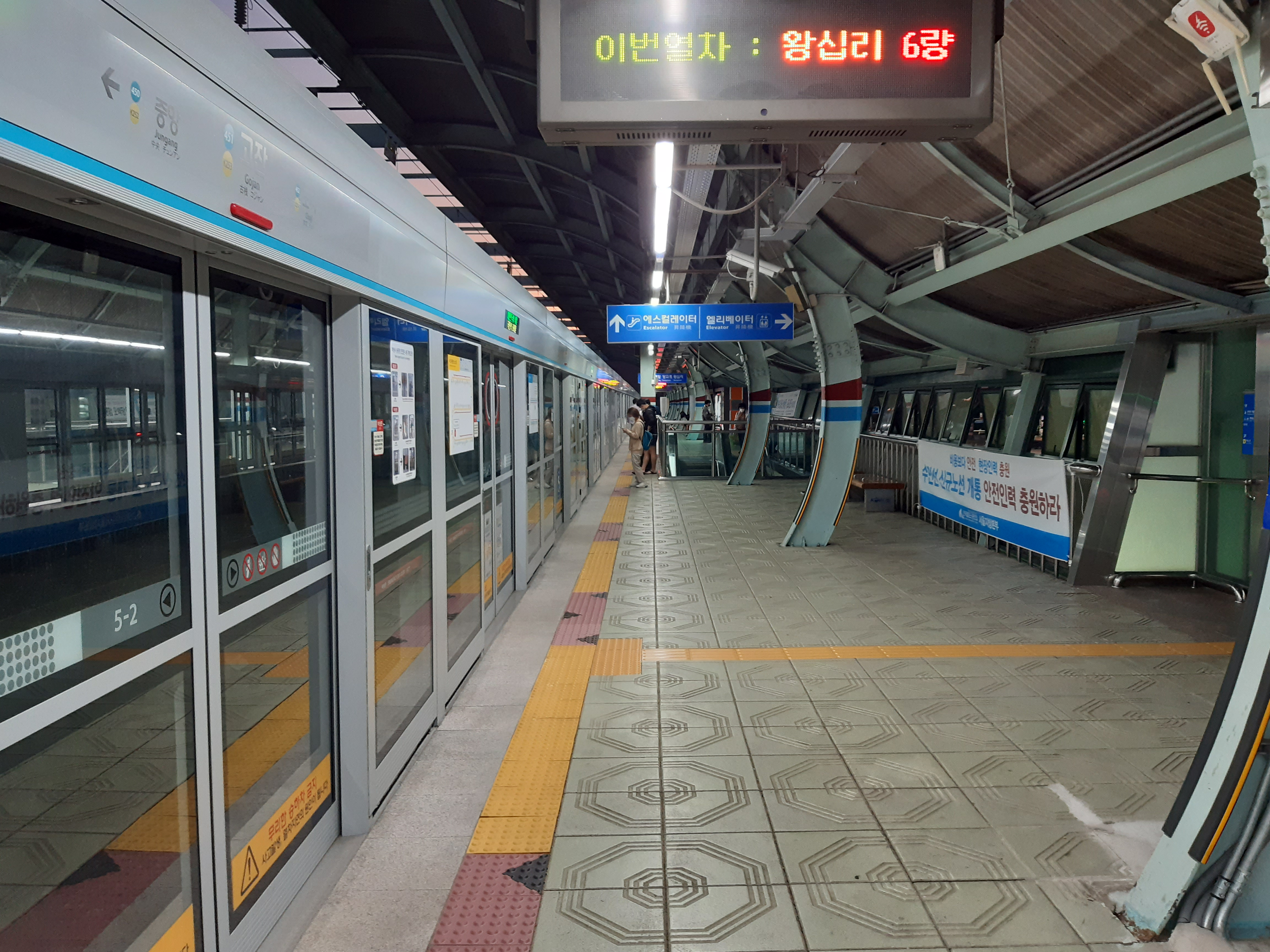
Gojan station platform at night

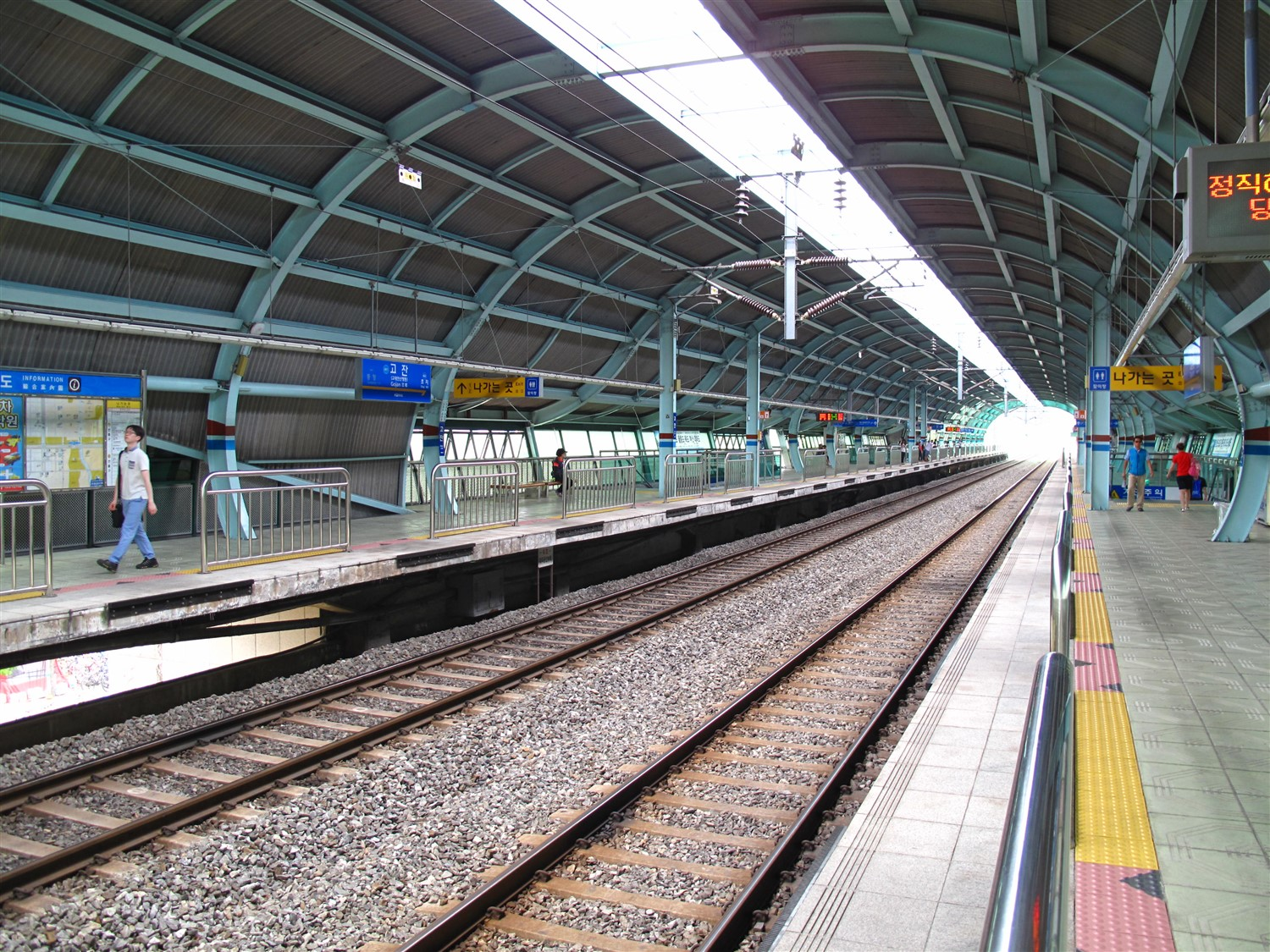
Platform at Gojan station

== Station layout ==
L2; Platforms	Side platform, doors will open on the left
L2; Platforms	Southbound	Ansan Line toward Oido (Choji) →
L2; Platforms	Northbound	← Ansan Line toward Jinjeop (Jungang)
L2; Platforms	Side platform, doors will open on the left

L1; Concourse	Lobby	Customer Service, Shops, Vending machines, ATMs

G	Street level	Exit

== Vicinity ==
- Exit 1 : Ansan City Hall, Ansan Wa~ Stadium, Ansan Arts Center, Korea University Ansan Hospital
- Exit 2 : Jinheung Elementary School

== History ==
Gojan station was at first a station of the Suin line.

- August 5, 1937: new station of Suin Line.
- April 10, 1969: change from not arrangement whistle stop to arrangement whistle stop.
- March 2, 1992: opening of the Ansan Line.
- April 1, 1994: opening of direct subway (Seoul Subway Line 4 – Gwacheon station)
- September 1, 1994: closing of Suin Line station

== Facilities ==
The station has several convenience amenities for passengers.

- Storyway convenience store, located inside the station, offering snacks, drinks, and daily necessities.
- A small bunsik (Korean snack food) stand inside the station, serving items such as tteokbokki and gimbap.

Preceding station	Seoul Metropolitan Subway	Following station
Jungang towards Jinjeop	Line 4	Choji towards Oido
Jungang towards Cheongnyangni	Suin–Bundang Line	Choji towards Incheon
