= Jungang station (Ansan) =

Metro station in Ansan, South Korea

Coordinates: 37°18′57.45″N 126°50′19.11″E

중앙 (서울예술대학교); Jungang (Seoul Institute of the Arts)
중앙 (서울예술대학교); Jungang (Seoul Institute of the Arts)
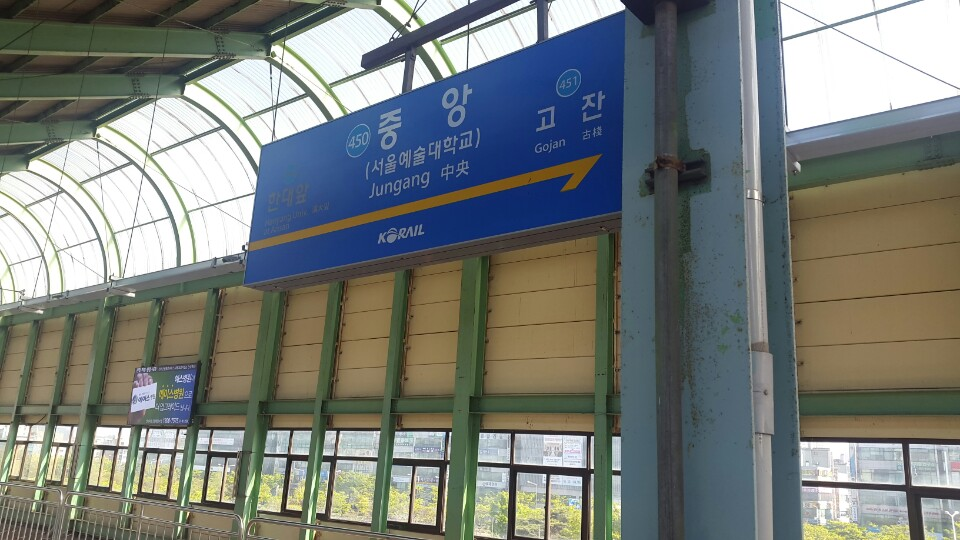
- Station sign

Korean name
- Hangul: 중앙역
- Hanja: 中央驛
- Revised Romanization: Jung-ang-yeok
- McCune–Reischauer: Chungang-yŏk

General information
- Location: 167-378 Gojan-dong, 918 Jungangdaero, Danwon-gu, Ansan-si, Gyeonggi-do
- Operator: Korail
- Lines: Line 4 Suin–Bundang Line
- Platforms: 2
- Tracks: 2

Construction
- Structure type: Aboveground

History
- Opened: October 25, 1988 (as part of Line 1)

Key dates
- April 1, 1994: Line 1 service transferred to Line 4
- September 12, 2020: Suin–Bundang Line opened
Services
Preceding station	Seoul Metropolitan Subway	Following station
Hanyang University at Ansan towards Jinjeop	Line 4	Gojan towards Oido
Sangnoksu towards Buramsan	Line 4 Express	Choji towards Oido
Hanyang University at Ansan towards Cheongnyangni	Suin–Bundang Line	Gojan towards Incheon
Location

Jungang station (Korean: 중앙역) is a railway station on Seoul Subway Line 4 and the Suin–Bundang Line in Ansan, South Korea. Its substation name is Seoul Institute of the Arts. It is a busy station located close to the Ansan Express Bus Terminal.

The Sinansan Line will connect Jungang station to Yeouido station in 2023.

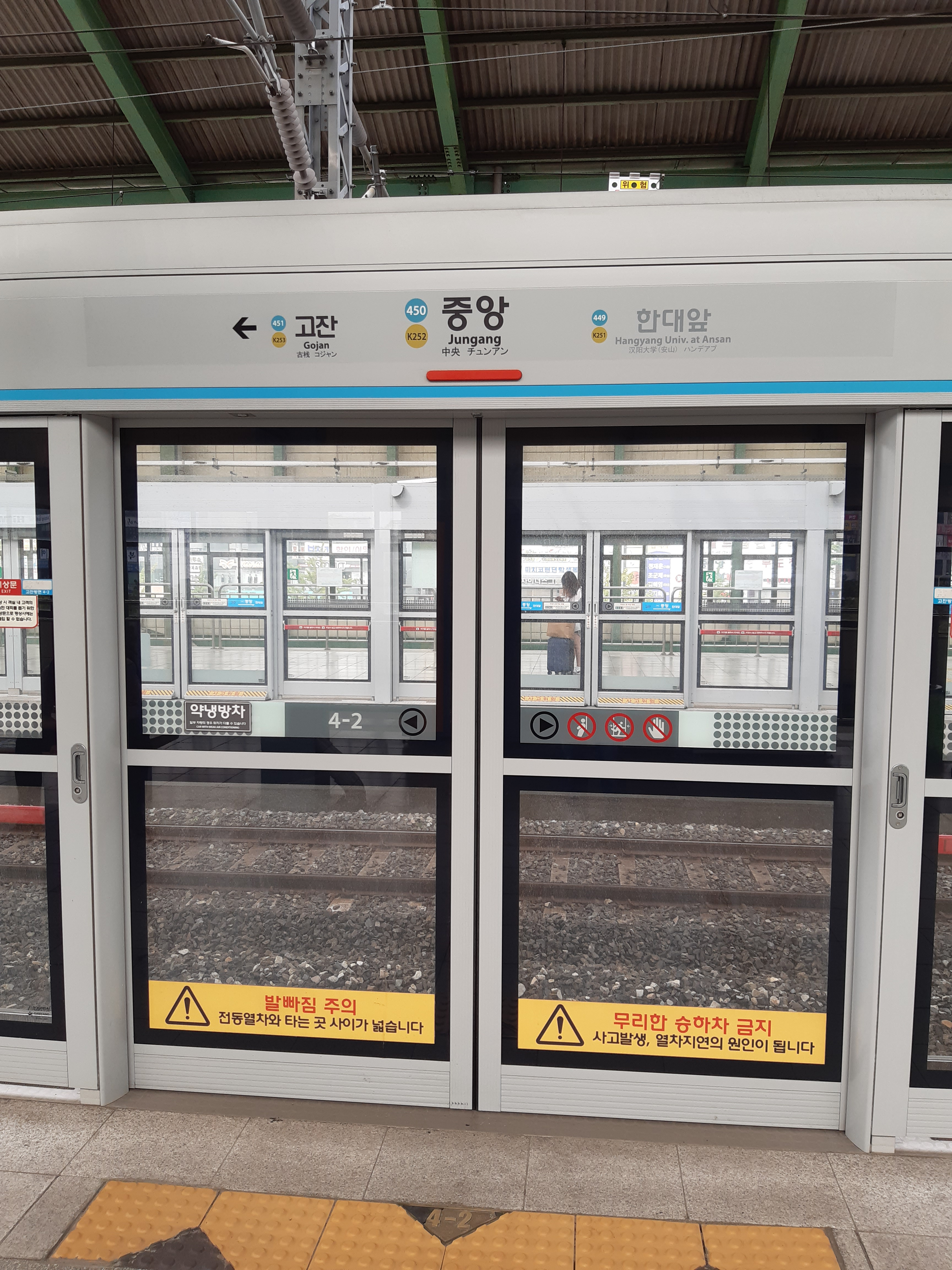
Screen door in Jungang station

== Station layout ==
L2; Platforms	Side platform, doors will open on the left
L2; Platforms	Southbound	Ansan Line toward Oido (Gojan) (Local) or (Choji) (Express) →
L2; Platforms	Northbound	← Ansan Line toward Jinjeop (Hanyang Univ. at Ansan) (local) or (Sangnoksu) (express)
L2; Platforms	Side platform, doors will open on the left

L1; Concourse	Lobby	Customer Service, Shops, Vending machines, ATMs

G	Street level	Exit

== Station information ==
Nearby universities include Seoul Institute of the Arts (substation name), and Korea Hotel Tourism College, a vocational school, is a two-minute walk away.

It is near this station where Ansan citizens gather when they want to drink and play in downtown Ansan. In addition, Ansan Bus Terminal is about a 10-minute walk from this station.

At the exit from Jungang station, there is an underground road crossing Jungang-daero.

To the south of the station are newly built apartment complexes and residential areas in the 2000s, and to the north of the station is a large floating population as commercial districts (CGV Ansan, etc.) that have been with Ansan's history are concentrated. In addition, Ansan Bus Terminal is about a 10-minute walk away.

Among the subway stations in Ansan, Jungang station has the largest number of passengers. It is the commercial and business center of Ansan, but there were not that many passengers in 2000. However, between 2000 and 2003, as Gojan New Town was built and the station influence area expanded, the number of users visiting Jungang station increased significantly.
