= Sindaebang station =

Train station in South Korea

Coordinates: 37°29′14″N 126°54′47″E

신대방; Sindaebang
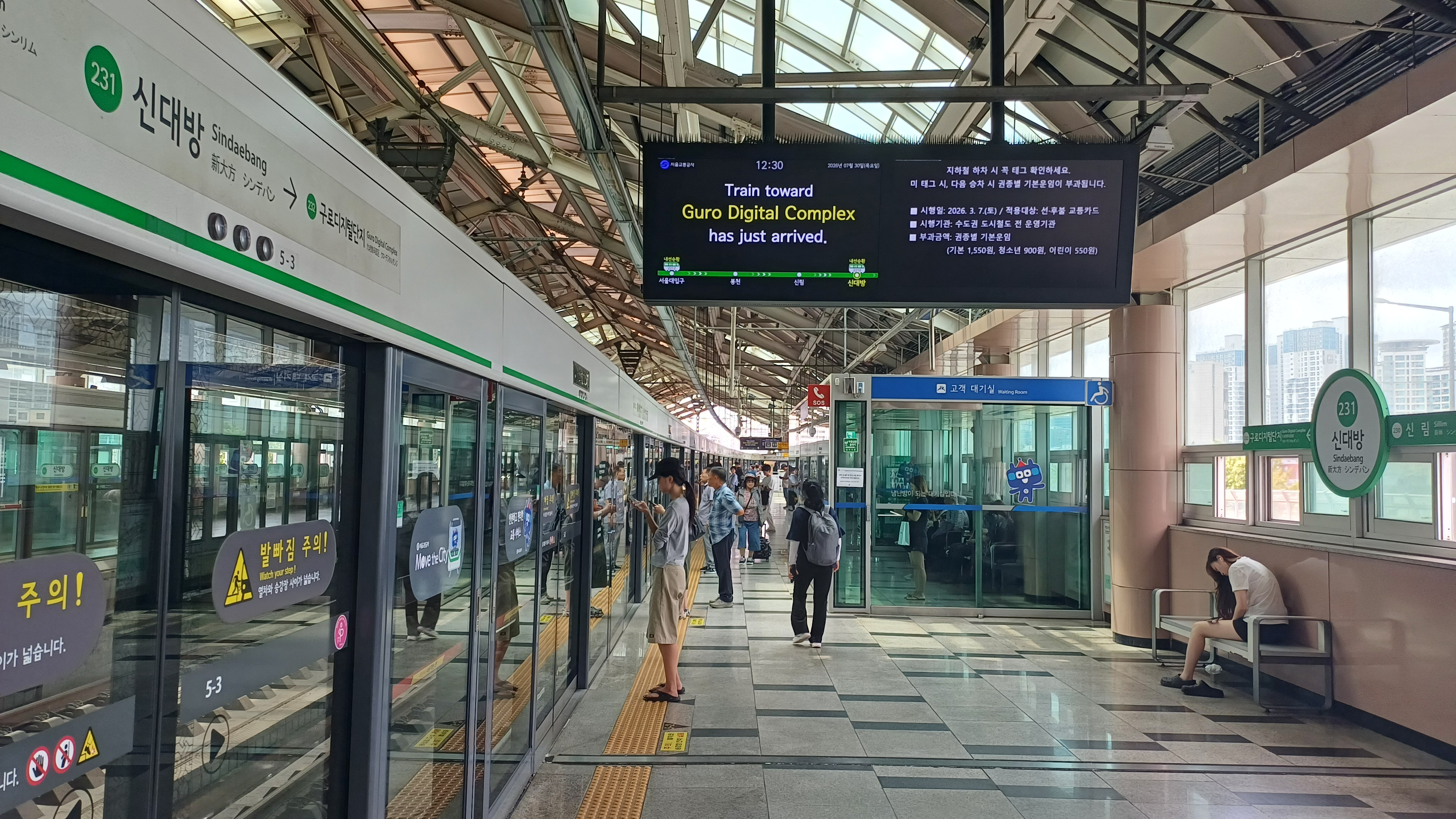

Korean name
- Hangul: 신대방역
- Hanja: 新大方驛
- Revised Romanization: Sindaebang-yeok
- McCune–Reischauer: Sindaebang-yŏk

General information
- Location: 643-1 Sindaebang-dong, 2 Daerim-ro, Dongjak-gu, Seoul
- Operator: Seoul Metro
- Line: Line 2
- Platforms: 2
- Tracks: 2
- Connections: Bus station

Construction
- Structure type: Aboveground

History
- Opened: May 22, 1984

Passengers
- (Daily) Based on Jan-Dec of 2012. Line 2: 51,642

Services
Preceding station	Seoul Metropolitan Subway	Following station
Sillim Next counterclockwise	Line 2	Guro Digital Complex Next clockwise
Location

Sindaebang Station is a station on Seoul Subway Line 2. A new branch of the Sillim Line serving the Nangok district of Sillim-dong will transfer to Line 2 at this station in the future.

== Station layout ==
L2; Platform level	Side platform, doors will open on the right
L2; Platform level	Inner circle	← Line 2 Next clockwise (Guro Digital Complex)
L2; Platform level	Outer circle	Line 2 Next counterclockwise (Sillim) →
L2; Platform level	Side platform, doors will open on the right

L1; Concourse	Lobby	Customer Service, Shops, Vending machines, ATMs

G	Street level	Exit
