= Seonbu station =

Metro station in Ansan, South Korea

선부 (한도병원); Seonbu (Hando Hospital)
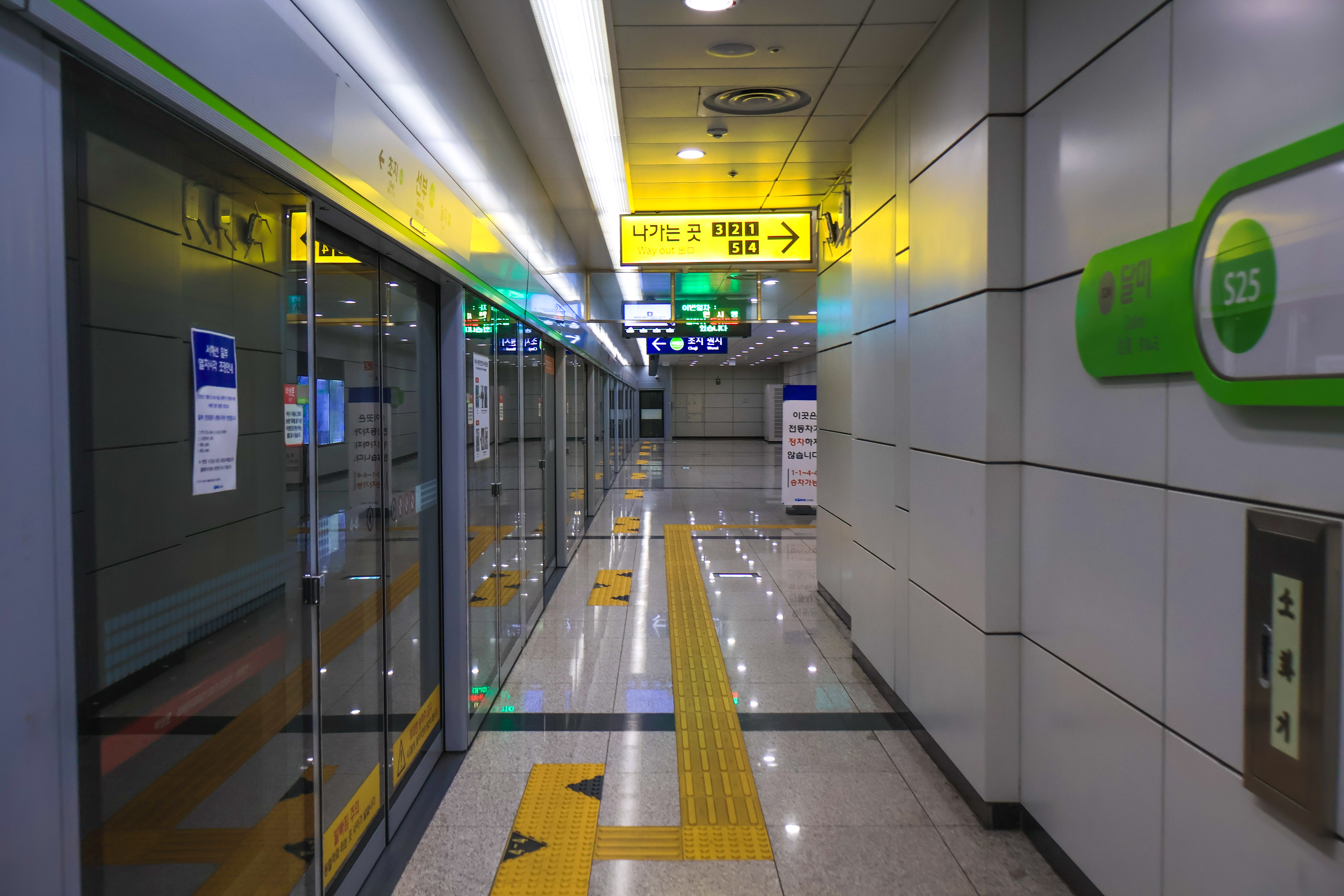
- Station platform

Korean name
- Hangul: 선부역
- Hanja: 仙府驛
- RR: Seonbu-yeok
- MR: Sŏnbu-yŏk

General information
- Location: Ansan, Gyeonggi-do
- Coordinates: 37°20′3.7″N 126°48′35.7″E
- Operator: Korail; SEO HAE RAIL CO., LTD.
- Line: Seohae Line
- Platforms: 2 (2 side platforms)
- Tracks: 2

Construction
- Structure type: Underground

History
- Opened: June 16, 2018
Location

Seonbu station is a station on the Seohae Line in South Korea. It opened on June 16, 2018. Its station subname is Hando Hospital, from the nearby Hando Hospital.

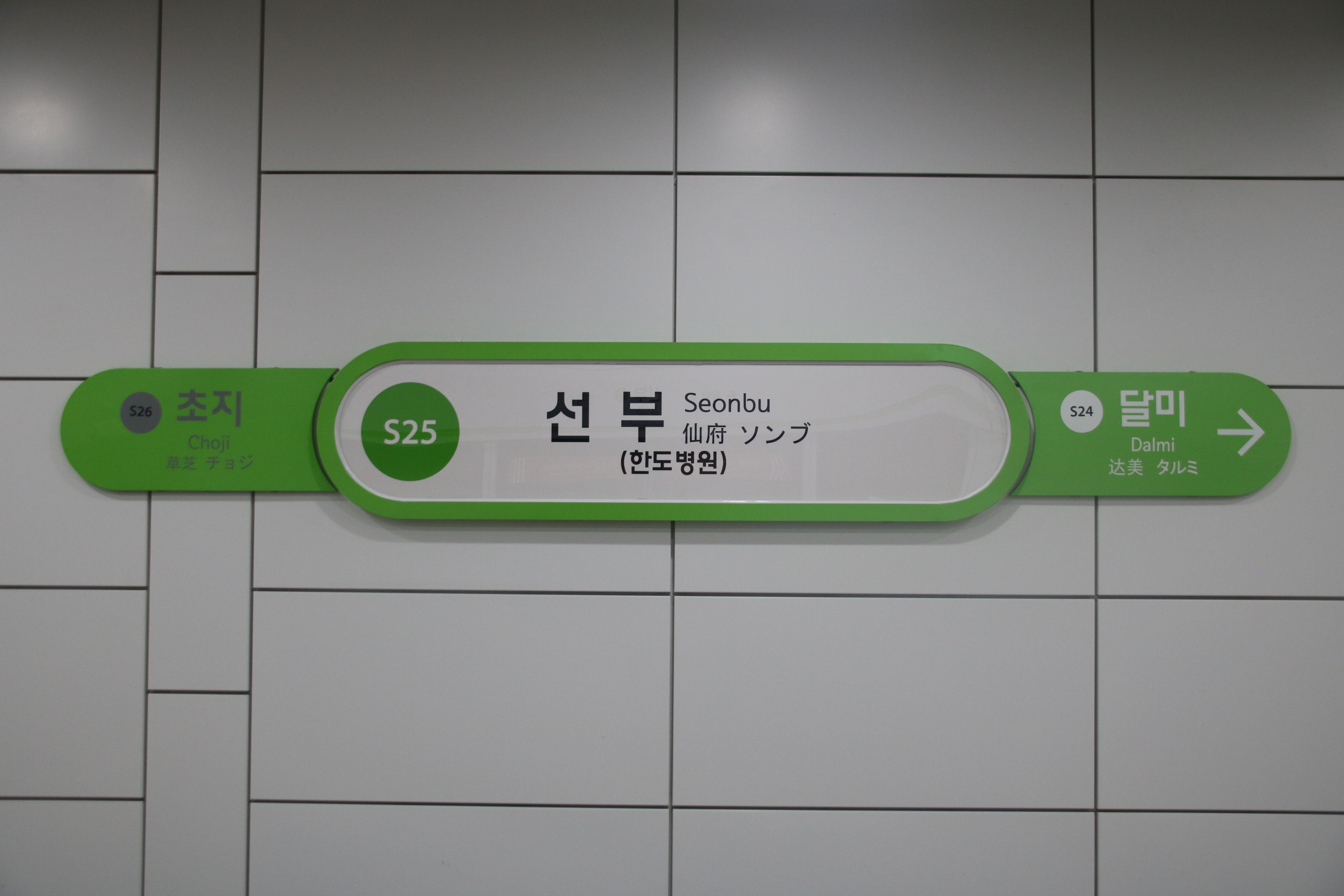
Station nameplate

Preceding station	Seoul Metropolitan Subway	Following station
Dalmi towards Ilsan	Seohae Line	Choji towards Wonsi
