= Choji station =

Metro station in Ansan, South Korea

Coordinates: 37.32057°N 126.80592°E

초지 (신안산대학교); Choji (Shin Ansan Univ.)
초지 (신안산대학교); Choji (Shin Ansan Univ.)
초지; Choji
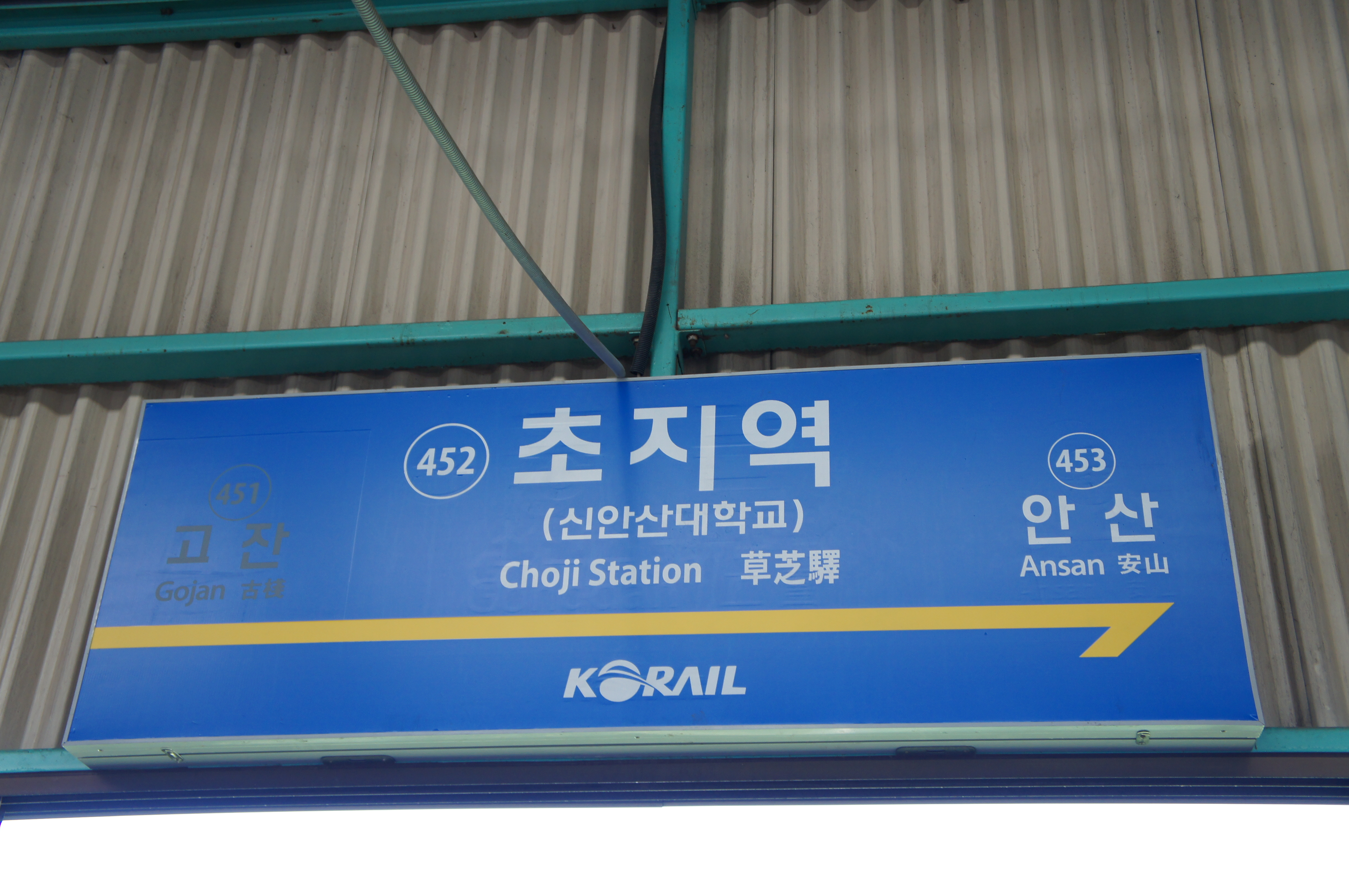

Korean name
- Hangul: 초지역
- Hanja: 草芝驛
- Revised Romanization: Choji-yeok
- McCune–Reischauer: Ch'oji-yŏk

General information
- Location: 26-3 Choji-dong, 620 Jungangdaero, Danwon-gu, Ansan-si, Gyeonggi-do
- Operator: Korail; SEO HAE RAIL CO., LTD.
- Lines: Line 4 Seohae Line; Suin–Bundang Line
- Platforms: 4 (4 side platforms)
- Tracks: 4

Construction
- Structure type: Elevated

History
- Opened: January 10, 1994 (as part of Line 1)
- Former names: Gongdan

Key dates
- April 1, 1994: Line 1 service transferred to Line 4
- June 16, 2018: Seohae Line opened
- September 12, 2020: Suin–Bundang Line opened
Location

Choji station (Korean: 초지역) is a commuter railway station on Seoul Subway Line 4, the Suin–Bundang Line and the Seohae Line in Ansan, South Korea. Trains on Line 4 utilize what is officially named the Ansan Line within the city of Ansan, as do those on the Suin-Bundang Line, which stop at the station on the same tracks using the same platforms.

With the KTX project from Incheon underway, Choji station has been confirmed as a KTX station.

The station opened as Gongdan station. In 2012, the city government of Ansan announced that this station would be officially renamed to Choji station at the end of June that year.

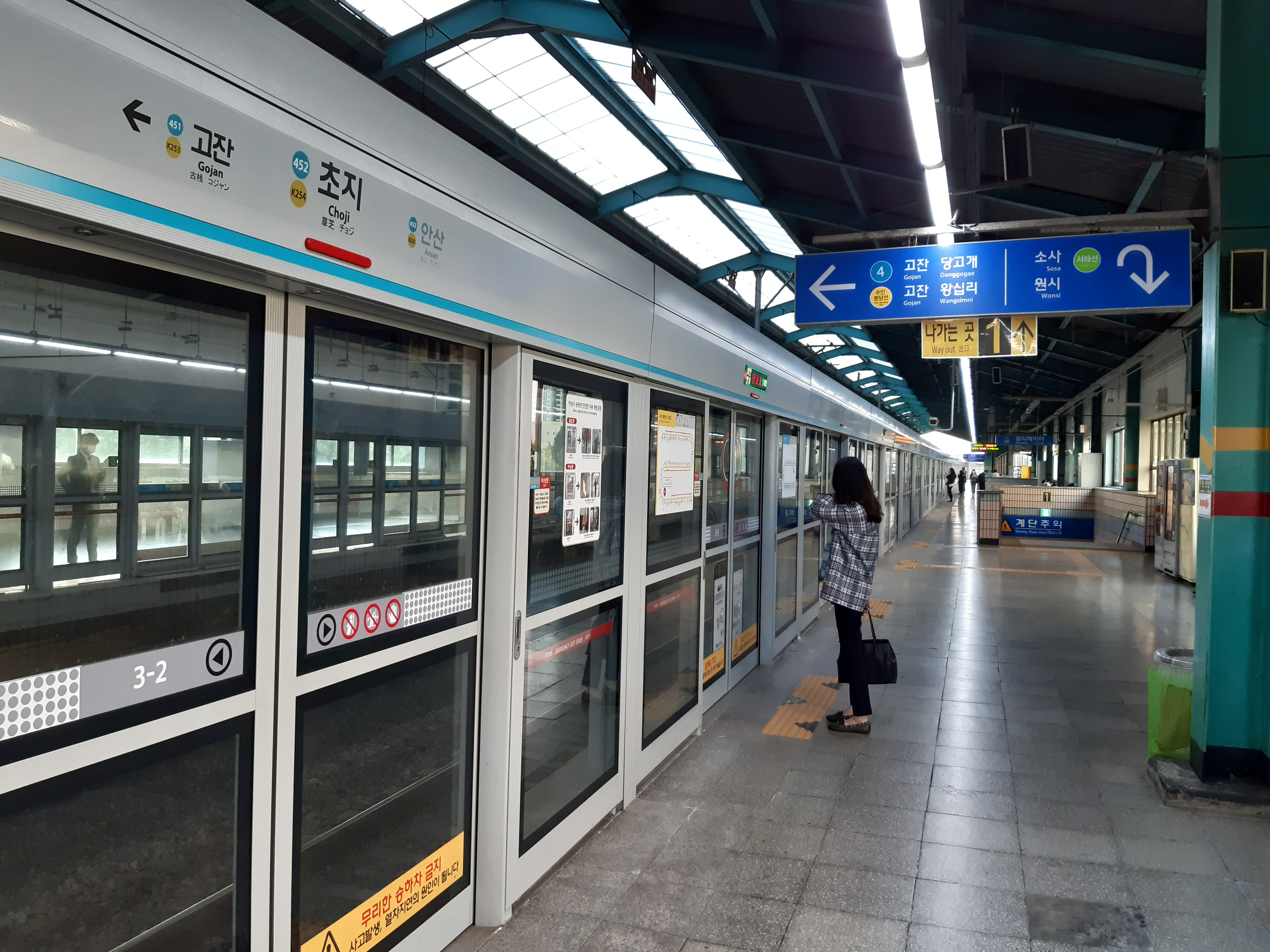
Platform (Line 4 & Suin-Bundang Line)

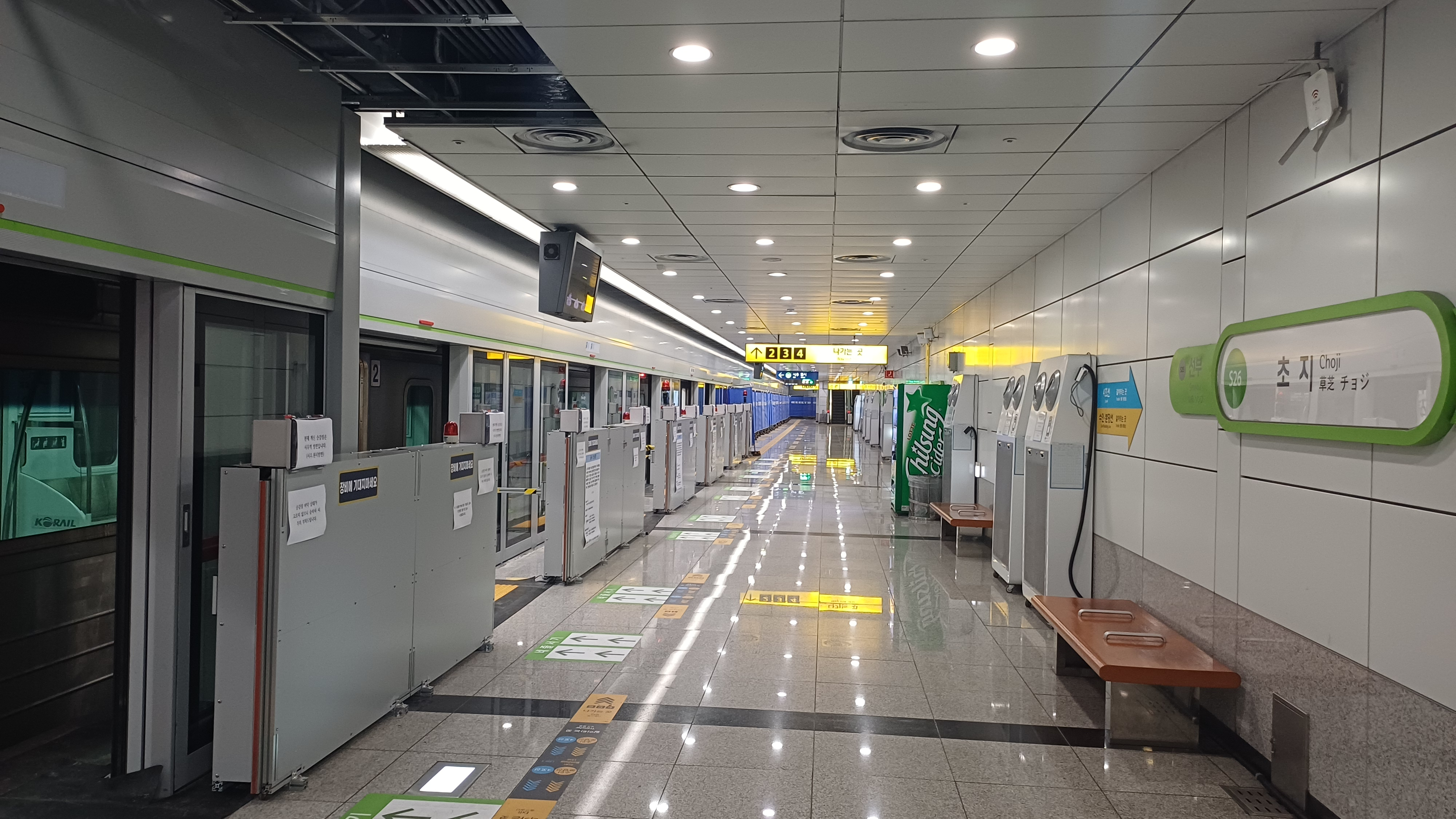
Platform (Seohae Line)

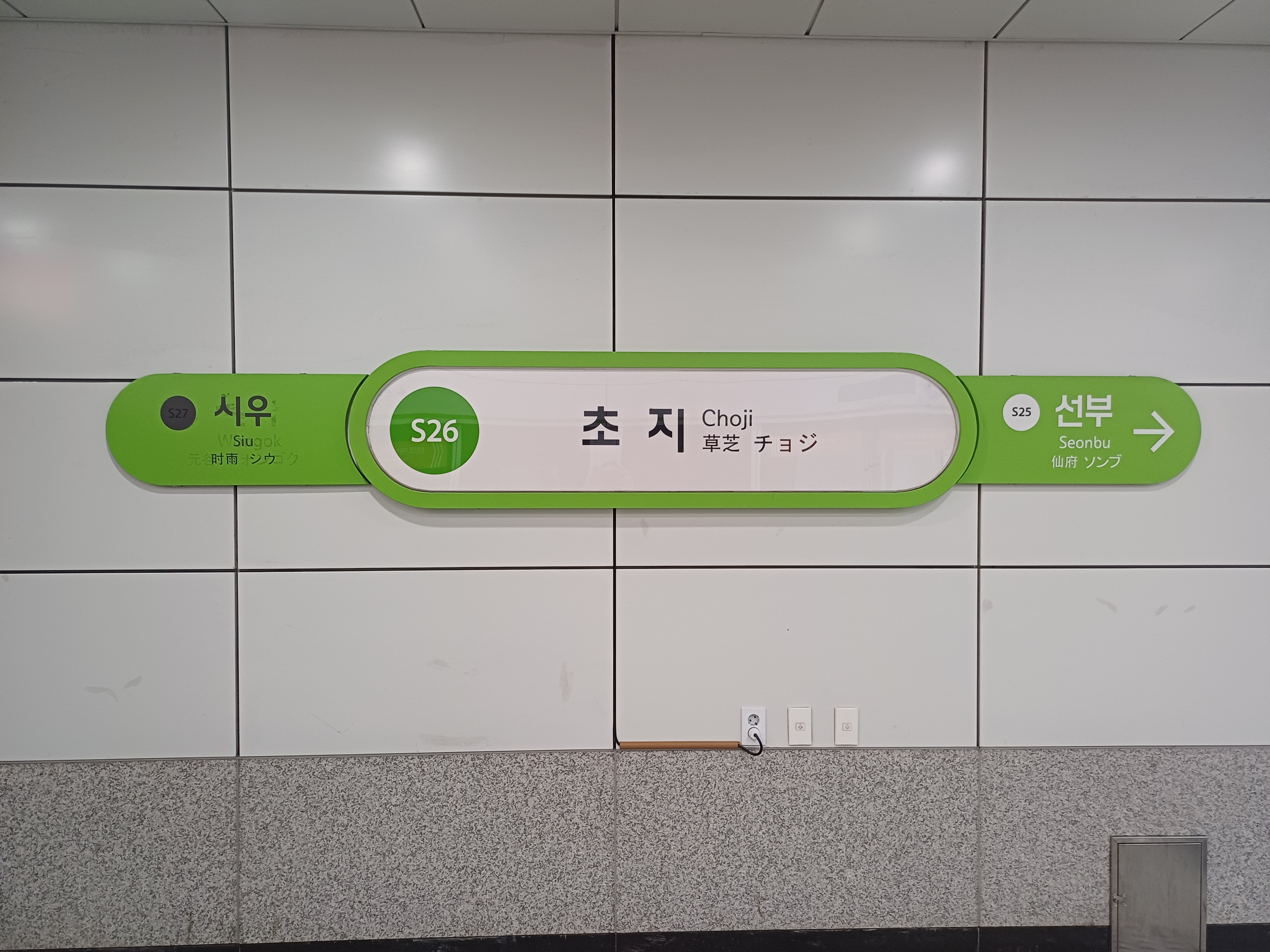
Station Sign (Seohae Line)

== Station layout ==
L2; Platforms	Side platform, doors will open on the left
L2; Platforms	Southbound	Ansan Line toward Oido (Ansan) →
L2; Platforms	Northbound	← Ansan Line toward Jinjeop (Gojan) (Local) or (Jungang) (Express)
L2; Platforms	Side platform, doors will open on the left

L1; Concourse	Lobby	Customer Service, Shops, Vending machines, ATMs

G	Street level	Exit

Preceding station	Seoul Metropolitan Subway	Following station
Gojan towards Jinjeop	Line 4	Ansan towards Oido
Jungang towards Buramsan	Line 4 Express	Ansan towards Oido
Gojan towards Cheongnyangni	Suin–Bundang Line	Ansan towards Incheon
Seonbu towards Ilsan	Seohae Line	Siu towards Wonsi
