= Guro-dong =

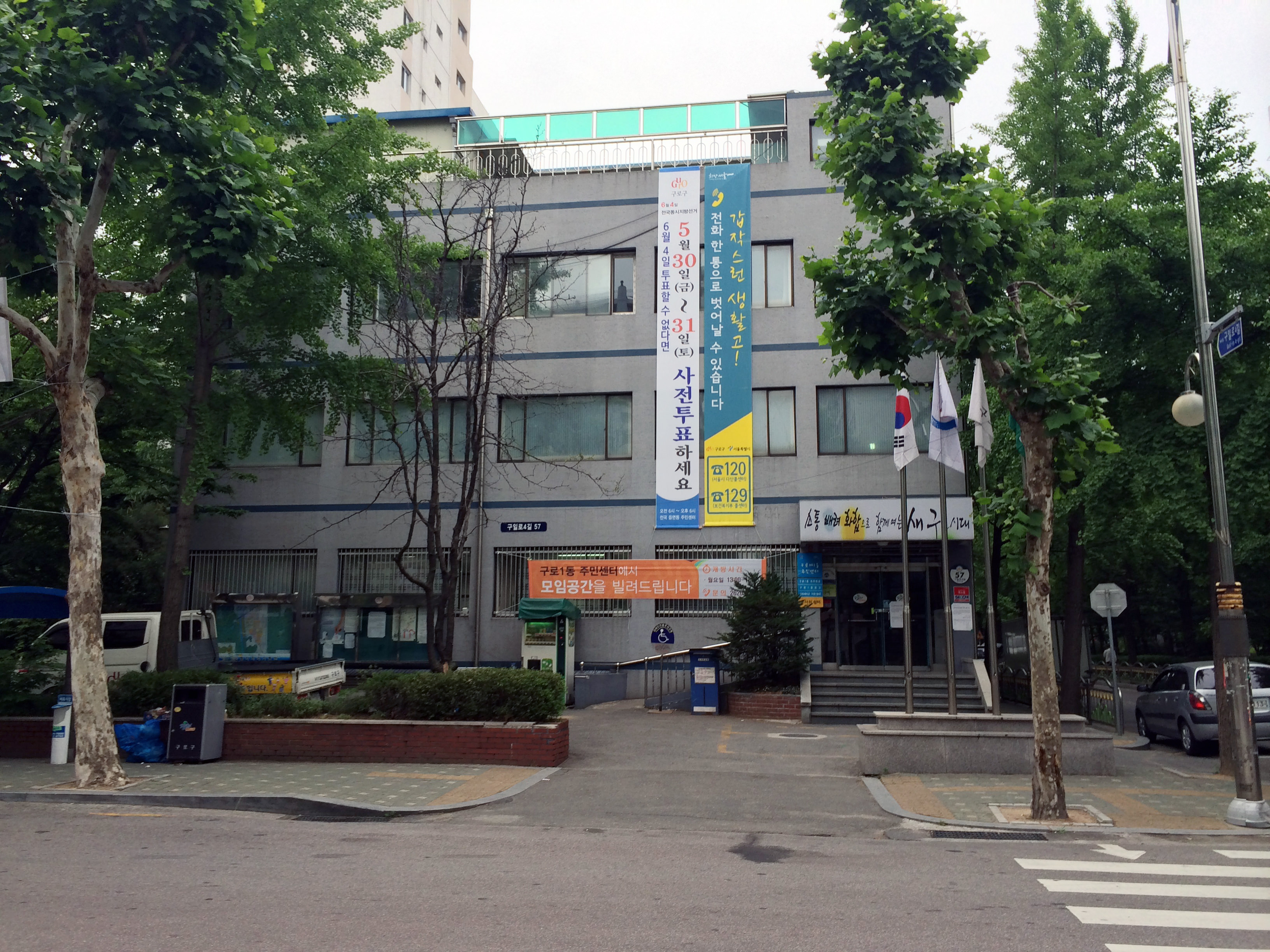
- Country: South Korea

Area
  - Total: 5.31 km^{2} (2.05 sq mi)

Population (2001)
  - Total: 146,909
  - Density: 27,700/km^{2} (71,700/sq mi)

Korean name
- Hangul: 구로동
- Hanja: 九老洞
- RR: Guro-dong
- MR: Kuro-dong

Guro-dong (Korean: 구로동) is a dong (neighborhood) of Guro District, Seoul, South Korea.

== See also ==
- Administrative divisions of South Korea
