= Baengma station =

Metro station in Goyang, South Korea

백마; Baengma
백마; Baengma
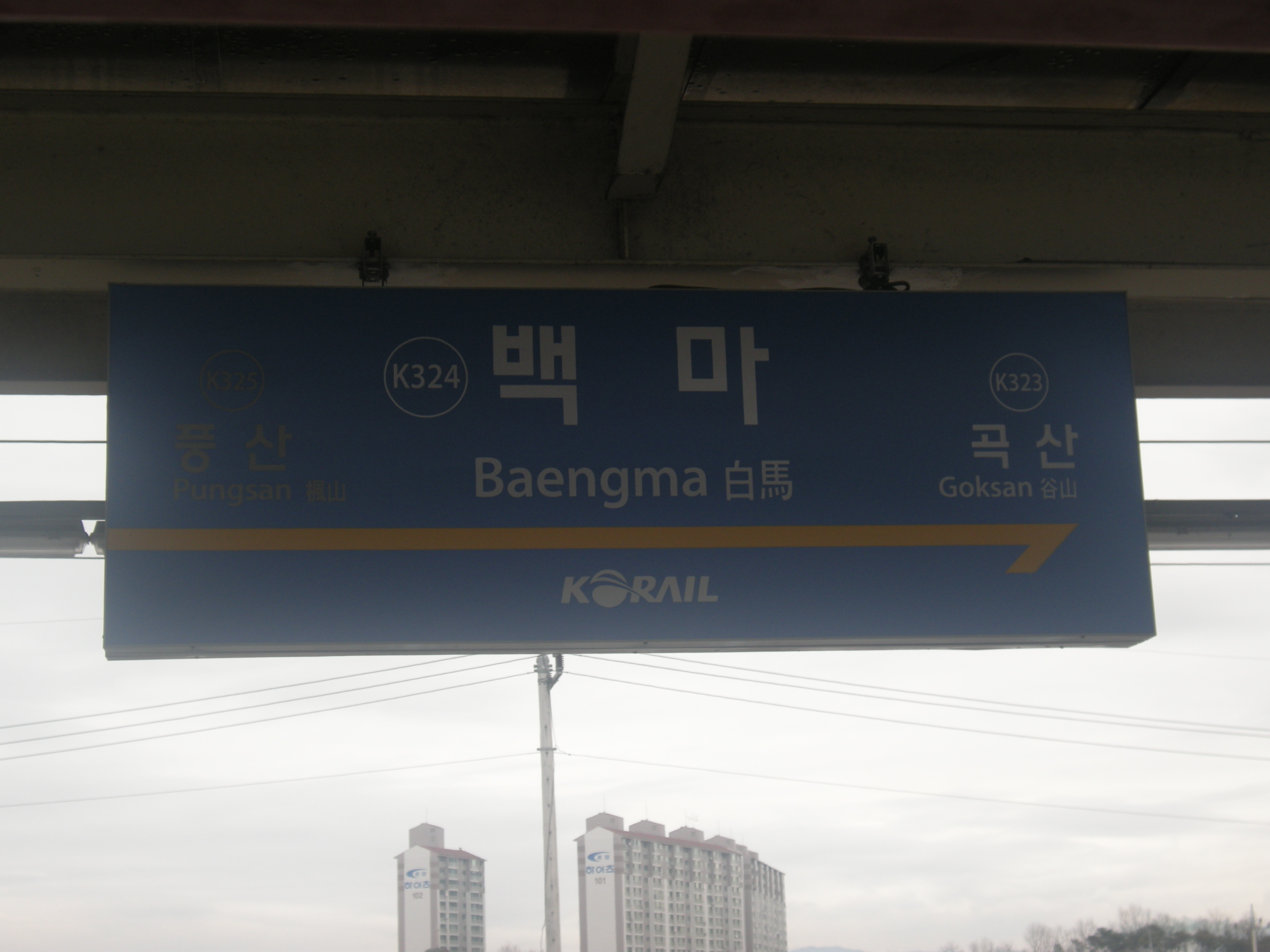

Korean name
- Hangul: 백마역
- Hanja: 白馬驛
- Revised Romanization: Baengmayeok
- McCune–Reischauer: Paengmayŏk

General information
- Location: 92 Madu 1-dong Ilsandong-gu, Goyang; Gyeonggi-do
- Coordinates: 37°39′30″N 126°47′40″E
- Operator: Korail
- Lines: Gyeongui–Jungang Line; Seohae Line
- Platforms: 2
- Tracks: 4
- Bus routes: 11; 017A 039 080 081 082A 082B

Construction
- Structure type: Aboveground

History
- Opened: April 26, 1966

Key dates
- July 1, 2009: Gyeongui–Jungang Line opened
- August 26, 2023: Seohae Line opened
Location

Baengma Station is a railway station on the Gyeongui–Jungang Line. It is located in Madu-dong, Ilsan, the city of Goyang.

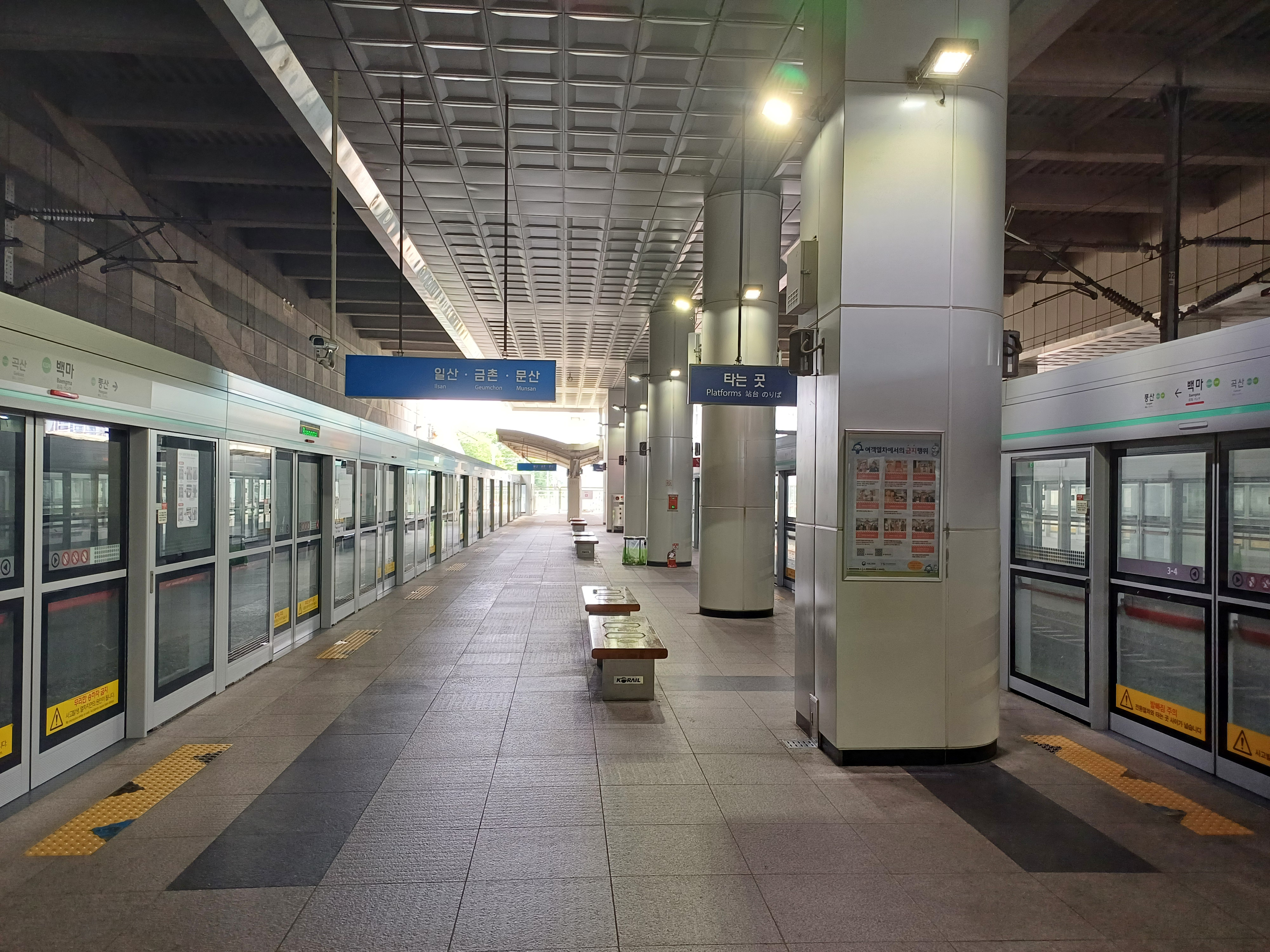

Preceding station	Seoul Metropolitan Subway	Following station
Pungsan towards Munsan	Gyeongui–Jungang Line	Goksan towards Jipyeong or Seoul Station
Ilsan towards Munsan	Gyeongui–Jungang Line Gyeongui Express	Daegok towards Yongmun
Pungsan towards Munsan	Gyeongui–Jungang Line Jungang Express	Goksan towards Yongmun
Ilsan towards Munsan	Gyeongui–Jungang Line Gyeongui Express	Daegok towards Seoul Station
Pungsan towards Ilsan	Seohae Line	Goksan towards Wonsi
