= Pungsan station =

Metro station in Goyang, South Korea

풍산; Pungsan
풍산; Pungsan
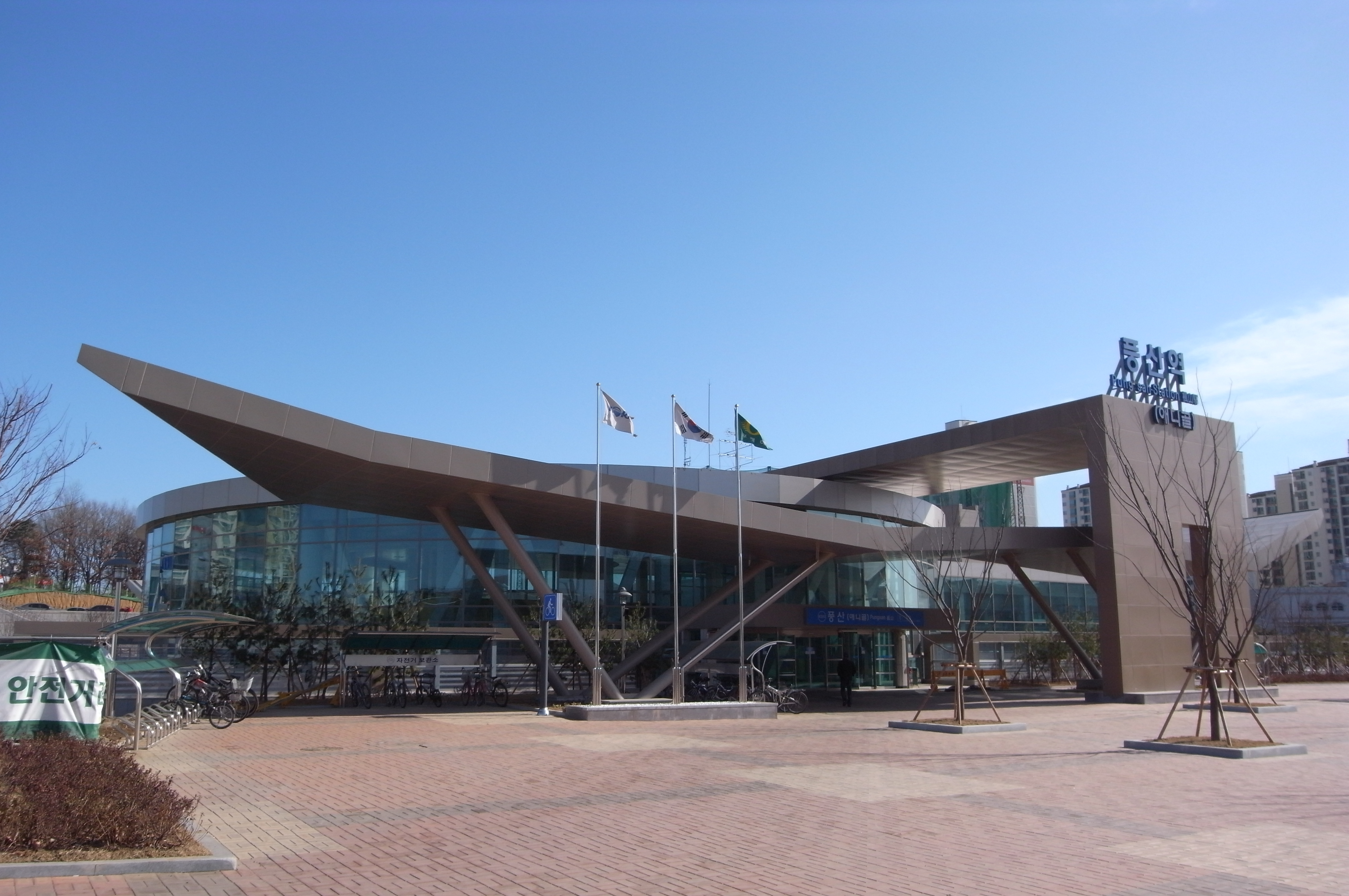

Korean name
- Hangul: 풍산역
- Hanja: 楓山驛
- Revised Romanization: Pungsannyeok
- McCune–Reischauer: P'ungsannyŏk

General information
- Location: 1445-1 Pung-dong; Ilsandong-gu, Goyang; Gyeonggi-do
- Coordinates: 37°40′20″N 126°47′12″E
- Operator: Korail
- Lines: Gyeongui–Jungang Line; Seohae Line
- Platforms: 2
- Tracks: 4
- Bus routes: 999; 010 070 081 087

Construction
- Structure type: Aboveground

Key dates
- July 1, 2009: Gyeongui–Jungang Line opened
- August 26, 2023: Seohae Line opened
Location

Pungsan station is a railway station on the Gyeongui–Jungang Line in South Korea. It has also been served by the Seohae Line since 26 August 2023, when the line was extended from Daegok to Ilsan over Gyeongui-Jungang Line tracks.

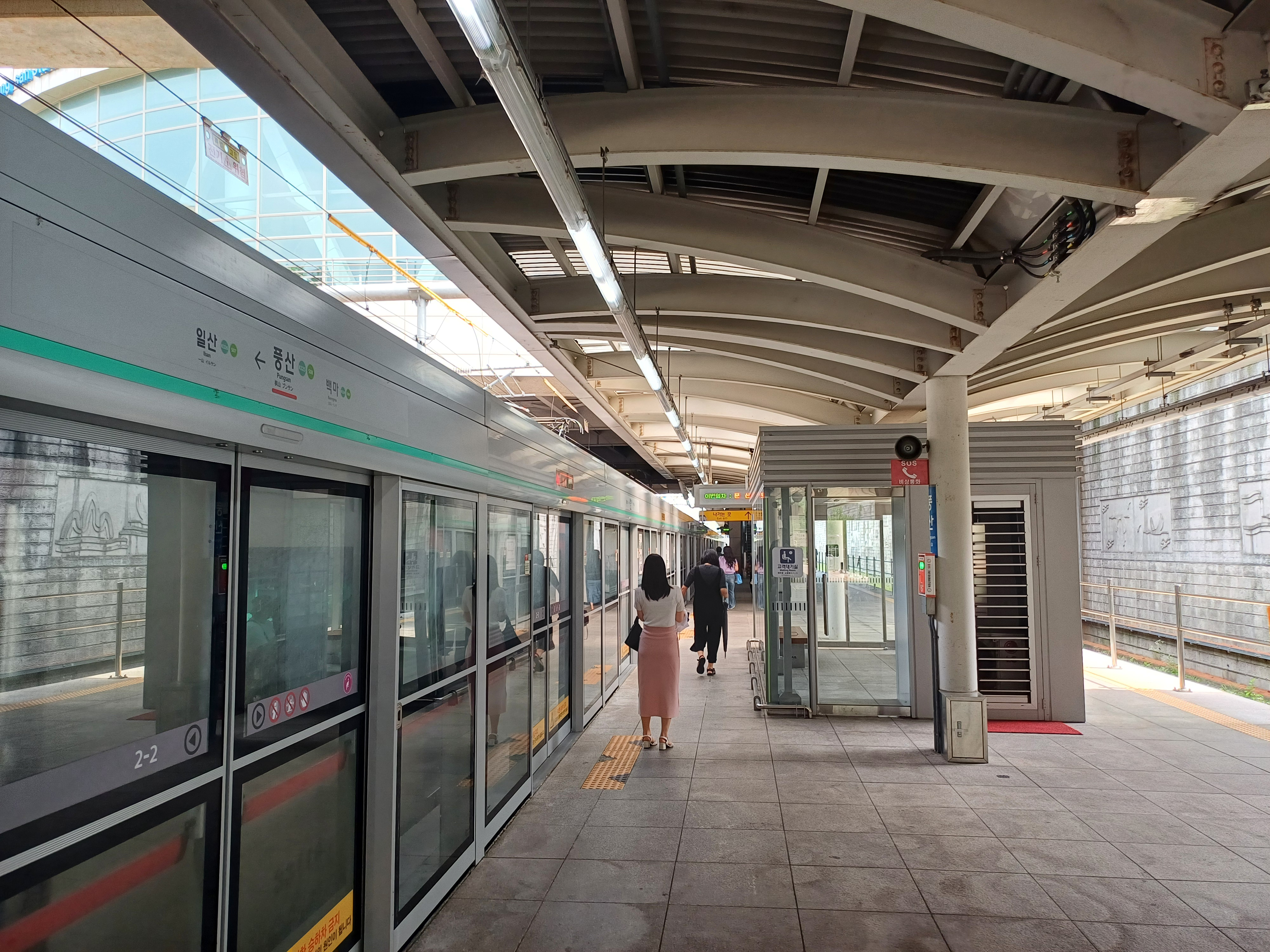
Platform

Preceding station	Seoul Metropolitan Subway	Following station
Ilsan towards Munsan	Gyeongui–Jungang Line	Baengma towards Jipyeong or Seoul Station
Ilsan towards Munsan	Gyeongui–Jungang Line Jungang Express	Baengma towards Yongmun
Ilsan Terminus	Seohae Line	Baengma towards Wonsi
