= Tanhyeon station =

Metro station in Goyang, South Korea

탄현; Tanhyeon
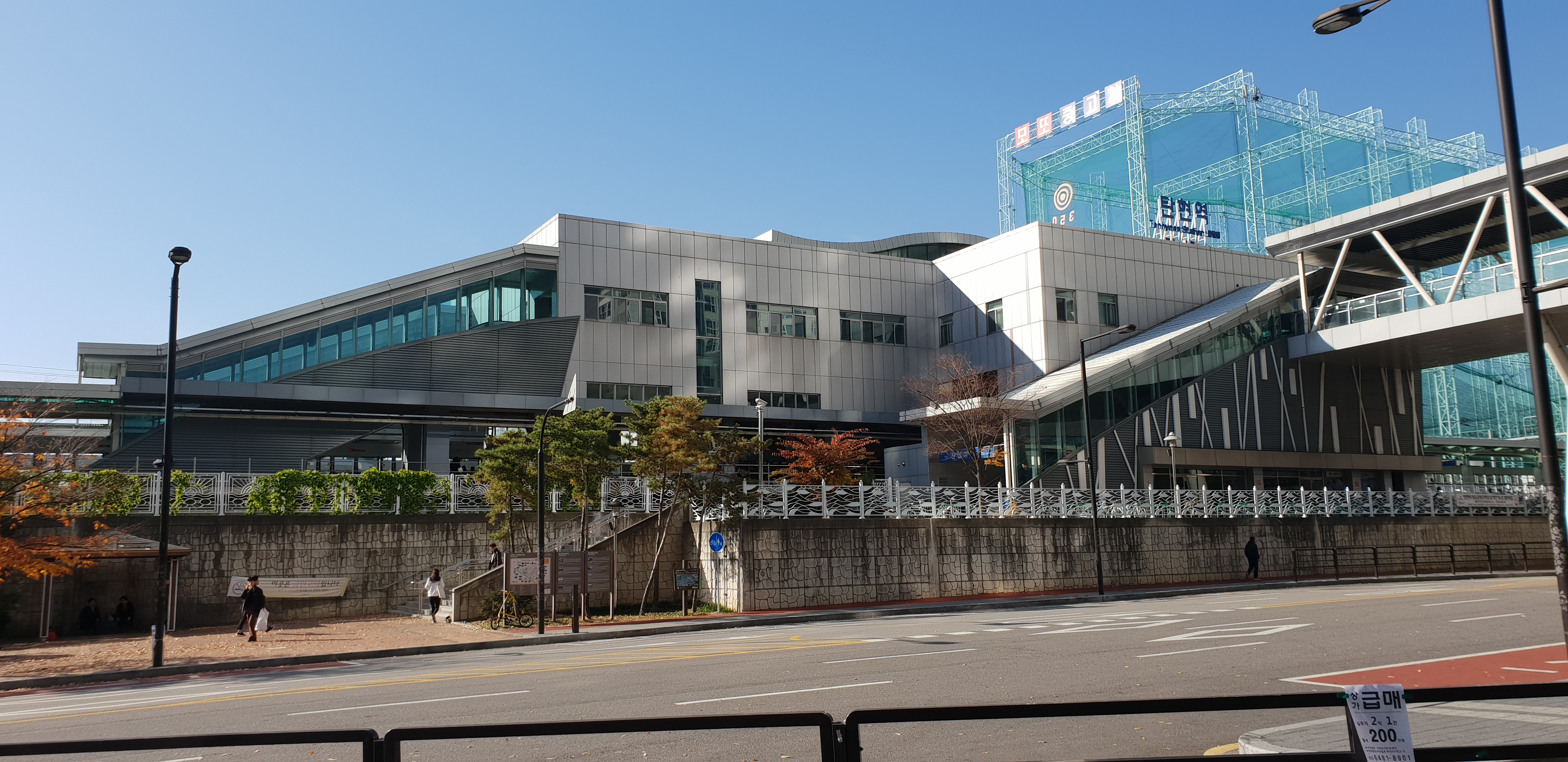

Korean name
- Hangul: 탄현역
- Hanja: 炭峴驛
- Revised Romanization: Tanhyeonnyeok
- McCune–Reischauer: T'anhyŏnnyŏk

General information
- Location: 238-8 Deogi-dong; Ilsanseo-gu, Goyang; Gyeonggi-do
- Coordinates: 37°41′38″N 126°45′40″E
- Operator: Korail
- Line: Gyeongui–Jungang Line
- Platforms: 2
- Tracks: 2
- Bus routes: 1500; 80 567 600 900; 7728; 071 074 079 092

Construction
- Structure type: Aboveground

History
- Opened: August 14, 2000

Key dates
- July 1, 2009: Gyeongui–Jungang Line started service
Location

Tanhyeon station is a railway station on the Gyeongui–Jungang Line.

== Etymology ==
The station's name, Tan-hyeon (Hanja: 炭峴), is derived from the Korean name Sut-gogae (숯고개), meaning "Charcoal Hill." Historically, the area was abundant in oak trees, which led to significant production of charcoal (tan). The name was eventually transcribed into Hanja based on its meaning.

Despite the shared name, this station is not related to Tan-hyeon-myeon in the neighboring city of Paju (which uses the Hanja 炭縣, meaning "Charcoal County"). To reach Paju's Tanhyeon-myeon—home to attractions like Heyri Village and the Shinsegae Premium Outlets—passengers should alight at Geumchon Station and transfer to a local bus, rather than using Tanhyeon Station.

=== Administrative History ===
Tanhyeon-dong was originally part of Deogi-dong (then Deogi-ri, Songpo-myeon, Goyang-gun). However, due to its proximity to Ilsan-eup, the area east of the Gyeongui Line was transferred to Ilsan-eup in 1987 and separated into Tanhyeon-ri, leading to the current administrative structure.

== History ==
- **August 14, 2000**: Opened for business as an unstaffed halt.
- **July 1, 2009**: With the opening of the Gyeongui Line of the Seoul Metropolitan Subway, the station became a subway stop. The distance from the Seoul starting point was adjusted from 26.5 km to 26.8 km.
- **December 1, 2009**: Sales of general railway passenger tickets were discontinued.
- **January 5, 2020**: Express trains began calling at the station.

== Passenger statistics ==
The data for 2009 reflects the 184-day period from the opening date of July 1, 2009, to December 31, 2009.

Line	Segment	Daily average number of passengers (passengers/day)										Ref.
Line	Segment	2009	2010	2011	2012	2013	2014	2015	2016	2017	2018	Ref.
Gyeongui–Jungang Line	Boarding	2,334	3,142	3,745	4,086	5,273	6,851	7,847	7,745	7,695	7,479	
Gyeongui–Jungang Line	Alighting	2,264	3,059	3,671	3,997	5,080	6,661	7,535	7,395	7,322	7,196	
Gyeongui–Jungang Line		2019	2020	2021	2022	2023						
Gyeongui–Jungang Line	Boarding	7,859	5,960	6,279	7,073	7,541						
Gyeongui–Jungang Line	Alighting	7,552	5,760	6,057	6,728	7,130						

Preceding station	Seoul Metropolitan Subway	Following station
Yadang towards Munsan	Gyeongui–Jungang Line	Ilsan towards Jipyeong or Seoul Station
Yadang towards Munsan	Gyeongui–Jungang Line Gyeongui Express	Ilsan towards Yongmun
Yadang towards Munsan	Gyeongui–Jungang Line Jungang Express	Ilsan towards Yongmun
Yadang towards Munsan	Gyeongui–Jungang Line Gyeongui Express	Ilsan towards Seoul Station
