= Yangsu station =

Station of the Seoul Metropolitan Subway

양수; Yangsu
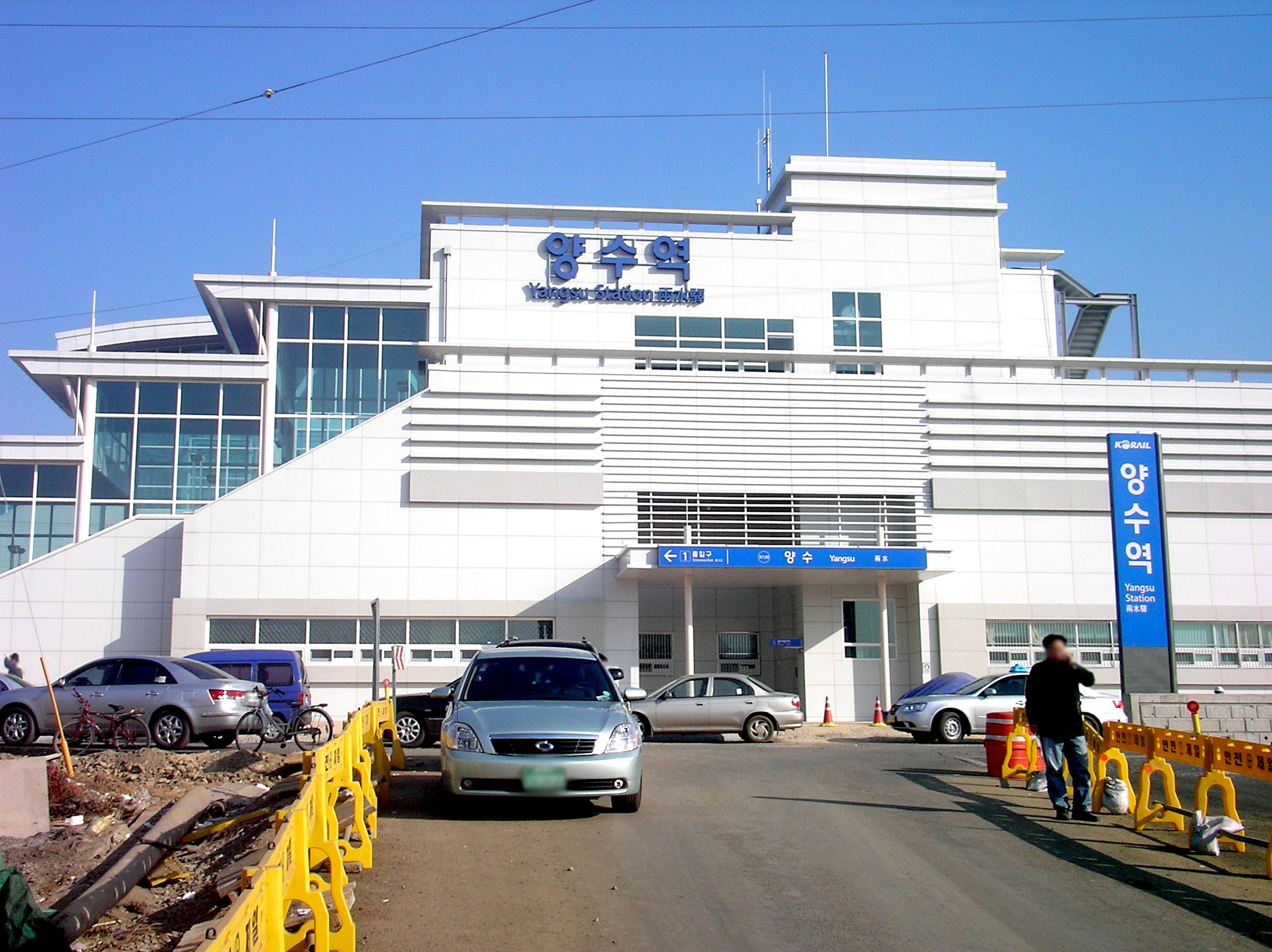

Korean name
- Hangul: 양수역
- Hanja: 兩水驛
- Revised Romanization: Yangsu-yeok
- McCune–Reischauer: Yangsu-yŏk

General information
- Location: 255 Yongdamni, 55-10; Mogwangno, Yangseo-myeon, Yangpyeong-gun, Gyeonggi-do
- Coordinates: 37°32′44″N 127°19′45″E
- Operator: Korail
- Line: Gyeongui–Jungang Line
- Platforms: 2
- Tracks: 4

Construction
- Structure type: Aboveground

History
- Opened: April 1, 1939

Key dates
- December 29, 2008: Gyeongui–Jungang Line opened
Location

Yangsu station is a station on the Gyeongui–Jungang Line in South Korea.

Preceding station	Seoul Metropolitan Subway	Following station
Ungilsan towards Munsan	Gyeongui–Jungang Line	Sinwon towards Jipyeong
Ungilsan towards Munsan	Gyeongui–Jungang Line Gyeongui Express	Sinwon towards Yongmun
Dosim towards Munsan	Gyeongui–Jungang Line Jungang Express	Yangpyeong towards Yongmun
