= Unjeong station =

Metro station in Paju, South Korea

음경
Unjeong
음경; Unjeong
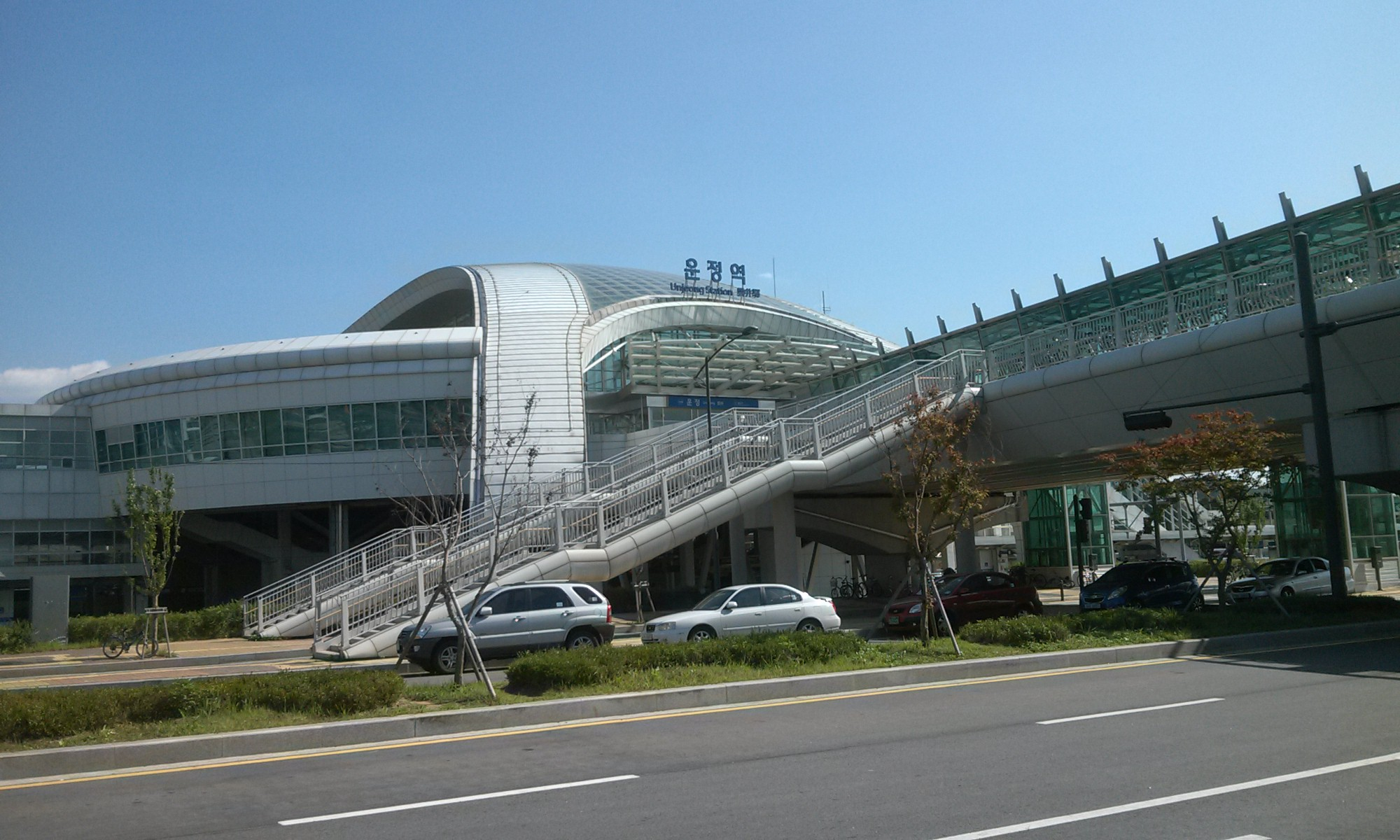

Korean name
- Hangul: 운정역
- Hanja: 雲井驛
- Revised Romanization: Unjeongyeok
- McCune–Reischauer: Unjŏngyŏk

General information
- Location: 299-4 ding-dong, Paju; Gyeonggi-do
- Coordinates: 37°43′32″N 126°46′02″E
- Operator: Korail
- Line: Gyeongui–Jungang Line
- Platforms: 2
- Tracks: 4
- Bus routes: 3

Construction
- Structure type: Aboveground

History
- Opened: May 11, 1956

Key dates
- July 1, 2009: Gyeongui–Jungang Line started service
Services
Preceding station	Seoul Metropolitan Subway	Following station
Geumneung towards Munsan	Gyeongui–Jungang Line	Yadang towards Jipyeong or Seoul Station
Geumneung towards Munsan	Gyeongui–Jungang Line Gyeongui Express	Yadang towards Yongmun
Geumneung towards Munsan	Gyeongui–Jungang Line Jungang Express	Yadang towards Yongmun
Geumchon towards Munsan	Gyeongui–Jungang Line Gyeongui Express	Yadang towards Seoul Station
Preceding station	Korail	Following station
Seoul Terminus	DMZ Peace Link Train	Imjingang towards Dorasan
Location

Unjeong station (Korean: 운정역) is a railway station on the Gyeongui–Jungang Line in Paju, Gyeonggi-do, South Korea. This station is located in Unjeong District, and the administrative district is Unjeong 4-dong. It is a separate station from Unjeongjungang station on GTX-A, located on the opposite side in Dongpae-dong (Unjeong 6-dong), and Unjeongjungang station is located in the direction of Gyoha District.

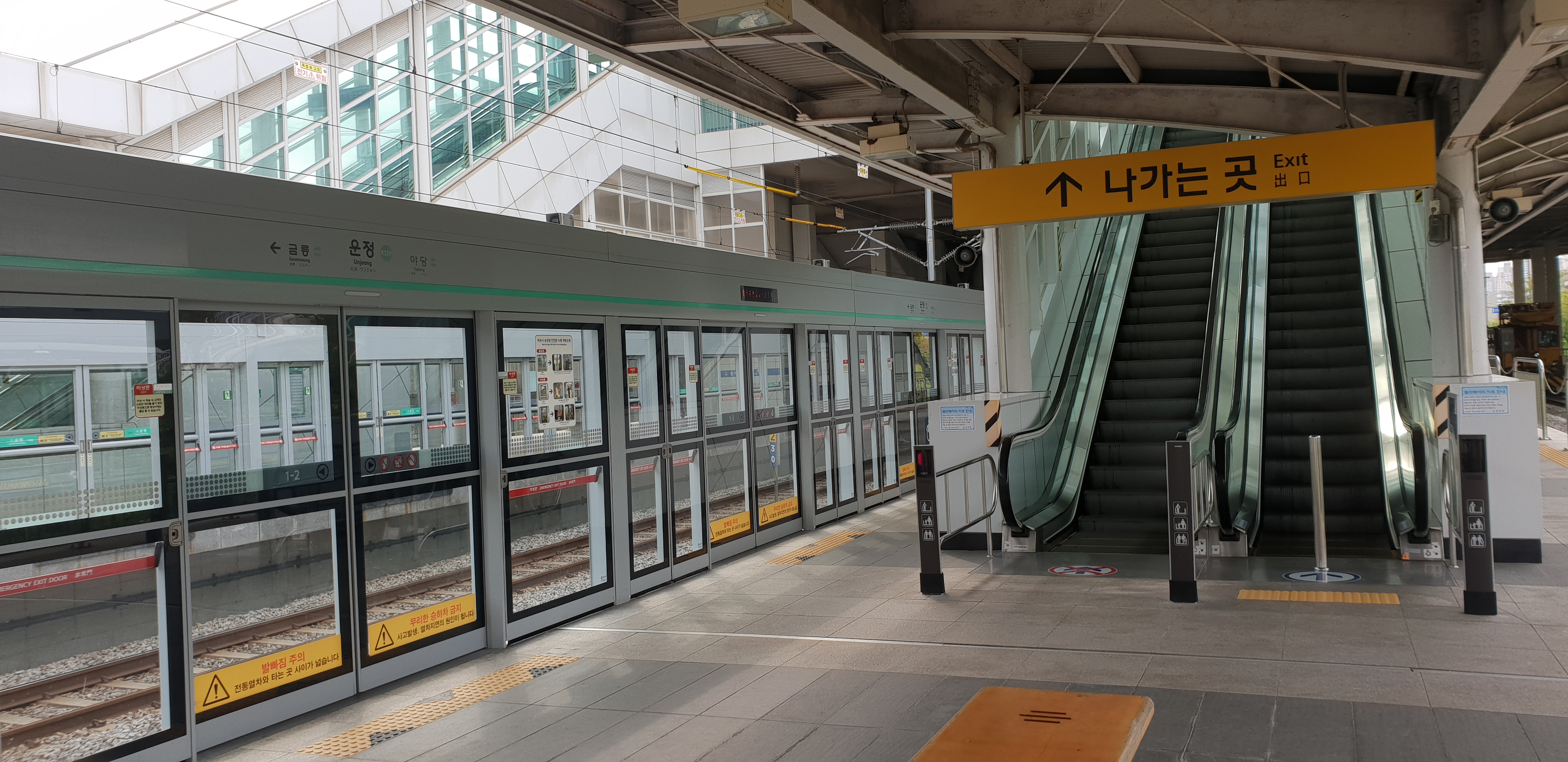
The platforms at Unjeong station

== Surrounding area ==
The station is a central hub for the Unjeong New Town district. In April 2026, Starfield Village Unjeong opened near the station, serving as a community-oriented "lifestyle center" developed by Shinsegae Property. Unlike the larger-scale Starfield malls, this facility is designed to cater to local residents, featuring a premium food market, cultural spaces, and educational facilities. It is connected to Unjeong Station via a pedestrian overpass, enhancing accessibility for commuters and local residents.

== Station layout ==
L2; Platforms	Platform 4	Gyeongui–Jungang Line toward Munsan (Geumneung) →
L2; Platforms	Island platform, doors will open on the left and right
L2; Platforms	Platform 3	Gyeongui–Jungang Line toward Munsan (Geumneung) →
L2; Platforms	Platform 2	← Gyeongui–Jungang Line toward Jipyeong (Yadang)
L2; Platforms	Island platform, doors will open on the left and right
L2; Platforms	Platform 1	← Gyeongui–Jungang Line toward Jipyeong (Yadang)

L1; Concourse	Lobby	Customer Service, Shops, Vending machines, ATMs

G	Street level	Exit

== Exits ==
Exit No.	Image	Destinations
1		Soricheon-ro
2		Unjeongyeok-gil

== Connections ==
- 7500: Majang lake
- 3: Sinwon apartment
- 52: Gwansan-dong, Byokjae market
- 80: Bakseok station
- 080A: Unjeong station (Circle Line)
- 077: Unjeong station (Circle Line)
- 080A: Unjeong station (Circle Line)
- 080B: Unjeong station (Circle Line)
- 082: Dongpae Middle & High School
- 084: 야당역
- 084 (와석초): Waseok Elementary School
- 084 (심야): Unjeong station
- 087: Eunseokgyo Sagori
- 088: Palhakgol
- 089: Jori-eup Community Center

== Around the station ==
- Green Seoul Aquarium
- Aseowon
- Unjeong
- Unjeong lake park
