= Paldang station =

Train station in South Korea

팔당; Paldang
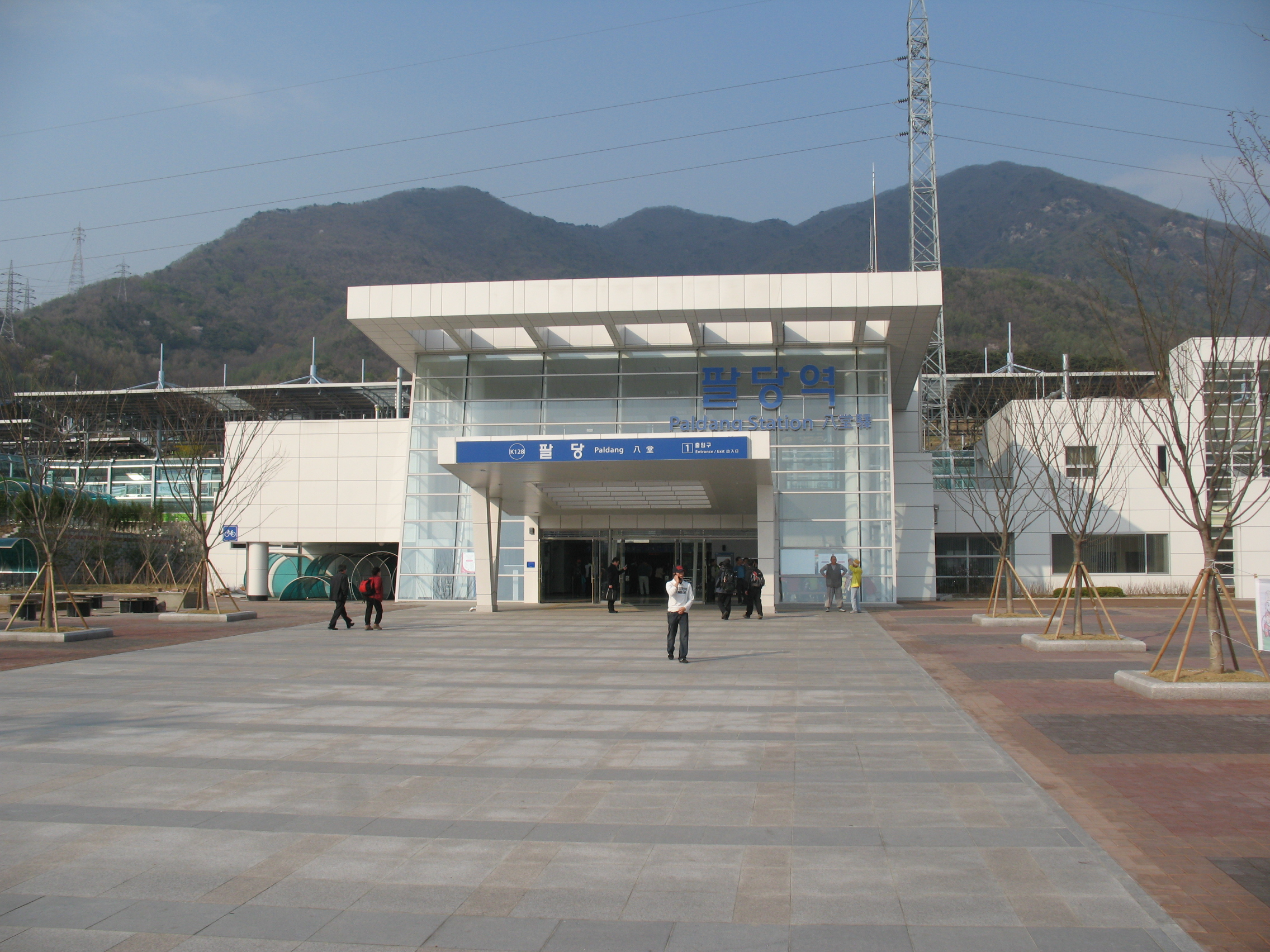

Korean name
- Hangul: 팔당역
- Hanja: 八堂驛
- Revised Romanization: Paldang-yeok
- McCune–Reischauer: P'altang-yŏk

General information
- Location: 399-7 Paldangni, 107 Paldangno, Wabu-eup, Namyangju-si, Gyeonggi-do
- Coordinates: 37°32′53.78″N 127°14′38.35″E
- Operator: Korail
- Line: Gyeongui–Jungang Line
- Platforms: 2
- Tracks: 4

Construction
- Structure type: Aboveground

History
- Opened: April 1, 1939

Key dates
- December 27, 2007: Gyeongui–Jungang Line opened
Location

Paldang Station (Korean pronunciation: [pʰalt͈aŋ]) is a station on the Gyeongui–Jungang Line, located in the city of Namyangju by the northern banks of the Han River. Although it is one of the older train stations in Korea (built prior to the 1945 liberation), the area around the station is not developed to a great degree.

== Cultural Heritage ==
The old station is well preserved, and is one of the best surviving examples of the architectural style of the Japanese occupation era. The blue roof is typical of early train stations in Korea, and for this reason, it was designated as a national cultural asset. The old station building is currently juxtaposed with the newly renovated station (completed in 2007), and is a striking example of how Korean railroads have evolved so rapidly over a relatively short period of time.

== Subway ==
Many residents near the station commute to Seoul daily, but the infrequent passenger train service previously rendered the area relatively isolated. To rectify this problem, residents petitioned local politicians and the Ministry of Construction. In response, Dosim & Paldang Stations were incorporated into the Jungang Line commuter rail system earlier than originally planned. The opening of this service has reduced commute times by over 30 minutes.

Preceding station	Seoul Metropolitan Subway	Following station
Dosim towards Munsan	Gyeongui–Jungang Line	Ungilsan towards Jipyeong
Dosim towards Munsan	Gyeongui–Jungang Line Gyeongui Express	Ungilsan towards Yongmun
