= Susaek station =

Station of the Seoul Metropolitan Subway

수색; Susaek
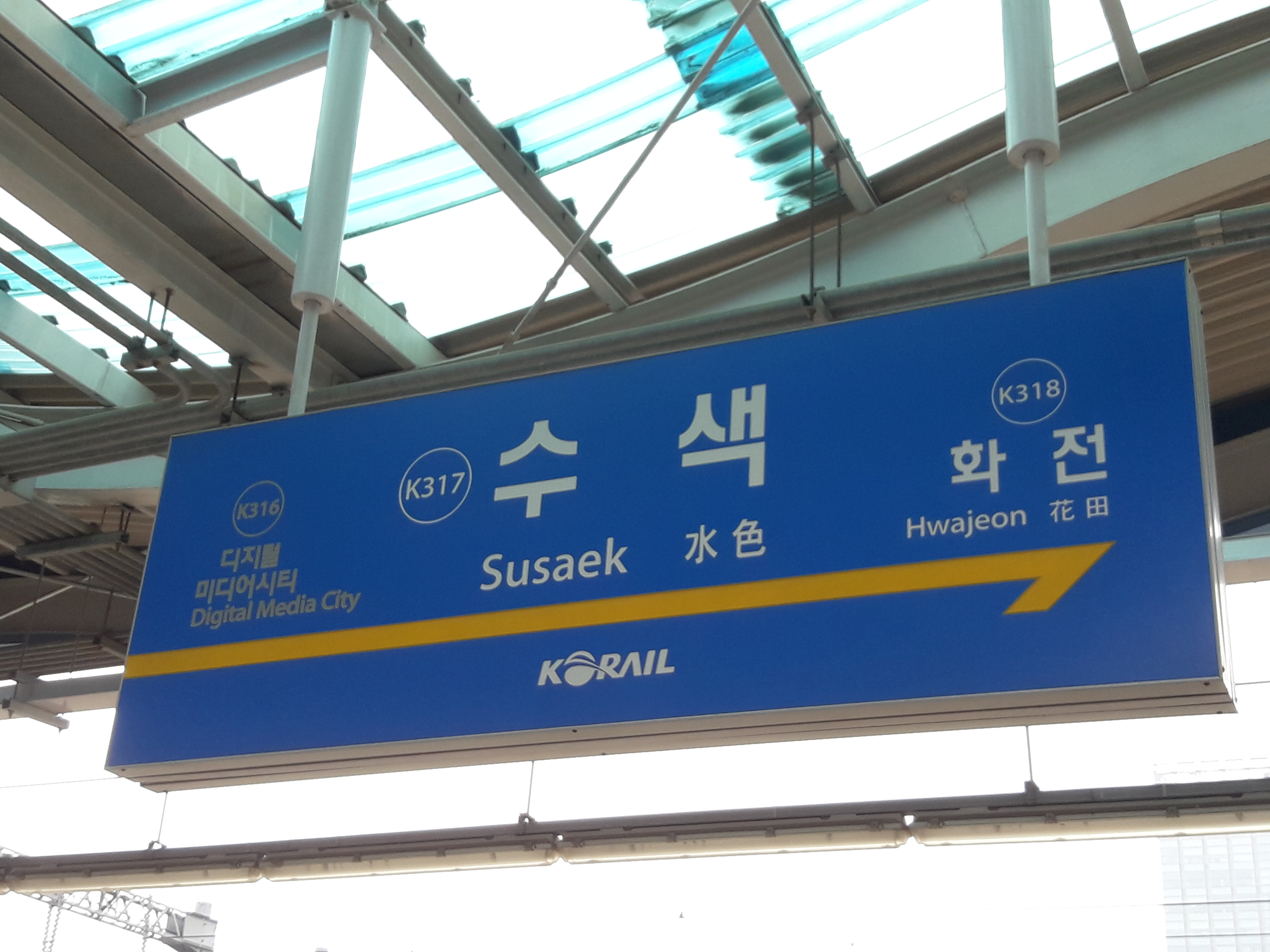

Korean name
- Hangul: 수색역
- Hanja: 水色驛
- Revised Romanization: Susaengnyeok
- McCune–Reischauer: Susaengnyŏk

General information
- Location: 81 Susaek-dong; Eunpyeong-gu, Seoul
- Coordinates: 37°34′54.34″N 126°53′38.21″E
- Operator: Korail
- Line: Gyeongui–Jungang Line
- Platforms: 4
- Tracks: 6
- Bus routes: 270 370 470 730 750A 750B; 7017 7021 7025 7726 7727 7728 7731 7738 7740; 9706 9708 9713; 66 75 76 77-2 770 773 780 800; 6005

Construction
- Structure type: Aboveground

History
- Opened: April 1, 1908

Key dates
- July 1, 2009: Gyeongui–Jungang Line opened
Location

Susaek Station is a station on the Gyeongui–Jungang Line. It is also the former name of Digital Media City Station on Line 6 of the Seoul Subway. Mugunghwa-ho and Saemaeul-ho trains that operate up to Seoul or Yongsan Stations are serviced at the Susaek Train Depot behind this station.

Preceding station	Seoul Metropolitan Subway	Following station
Korea Aerospace University towards Munsan	Gyeongui–Jungang Line	Digital Media City towards Jipyeong or Seoul Station
Korea Aerospace University towards Munsan	Gyeongui–Jungang Line Jungang Express	Digital Media City towards Yongmun
