= Guksu station =

Train station in South Korea

국수; Guksu
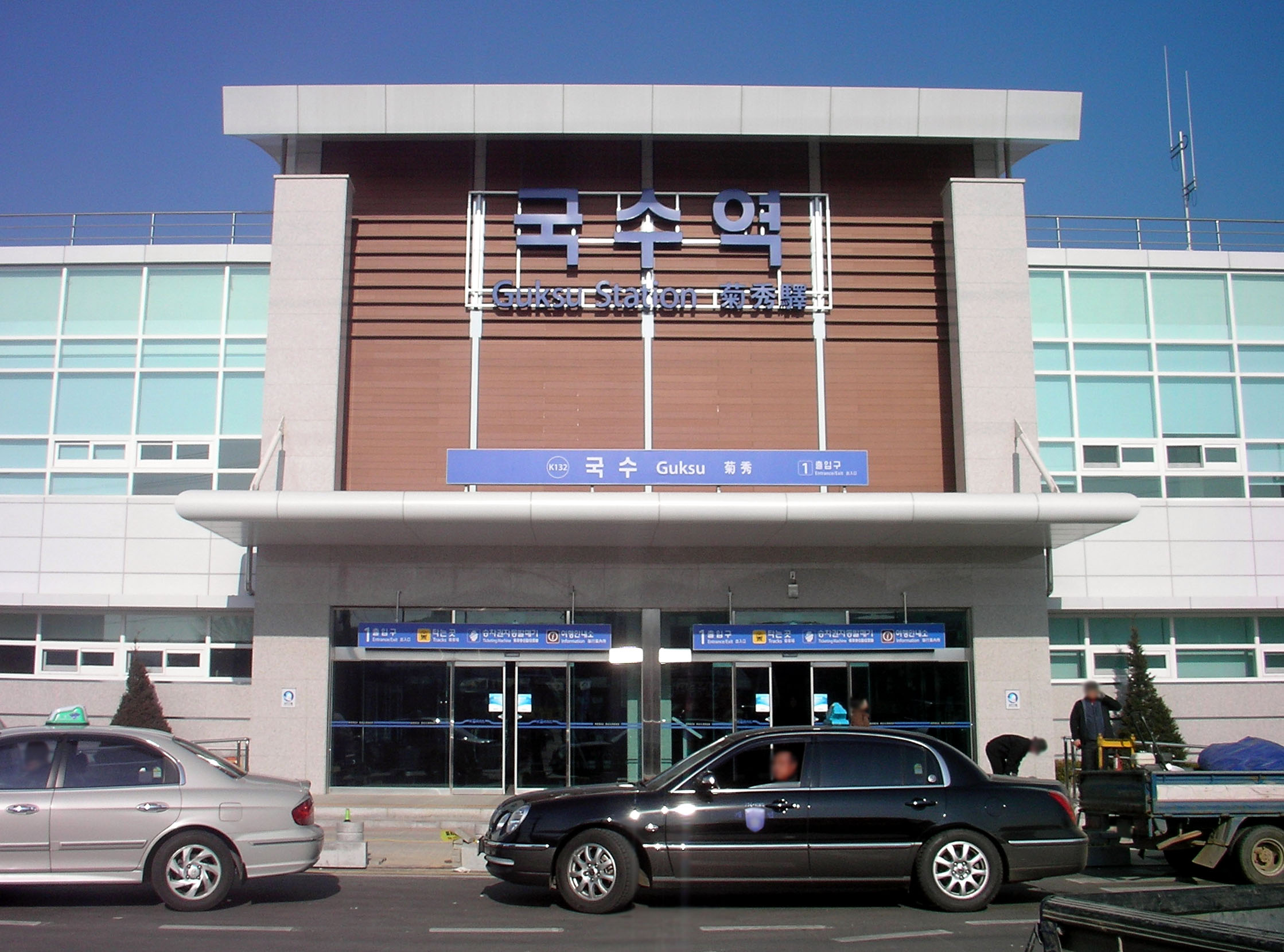

Korean name
- Hangul: 국수역
- Hanja: 菊秀驛
- Revised Romanization: Guksu-yeok
- McCune–Reischauer: Kuksu-yŏk

General information
- Location: 258-25 Guksuri, 45; Guksuyeokgil, Yangseo-myeon, Yangpyeong-gun, Gyeonggi-do
- Coordinates: 37°30′58″N 127°23′58″E
- Operator: Korail
- Line: Gyeongui–Jungang Line
- Platforms: 2
- Tracks: 4

Construction
- Structure type: Aboveground

History
- Opened: April 1, 1939

Key dates
- December 23, 2009: Gyeongui–Jungang Line opened
Location

Guksu station is a station on the Gyeongui–Jungang Line, located in the county of Yangpyeong. The station used to be the eastern terminus of the Gyeongui–Jungang Line. The line now extends further to Jipyeong station to the east.

Preceding station	Seoul Metropolitan Subway	Following station
Sinwon towards Munsan	Gyeongui–Jungang Line	Asin towards Jipyeong
Sinwon towards Munsan	Gyeongui–Jungang Line Gyeongui Express	Asin towards Yongmun
