= Yadang station =

Metro station in Paju, South Korea

야당; Yadang
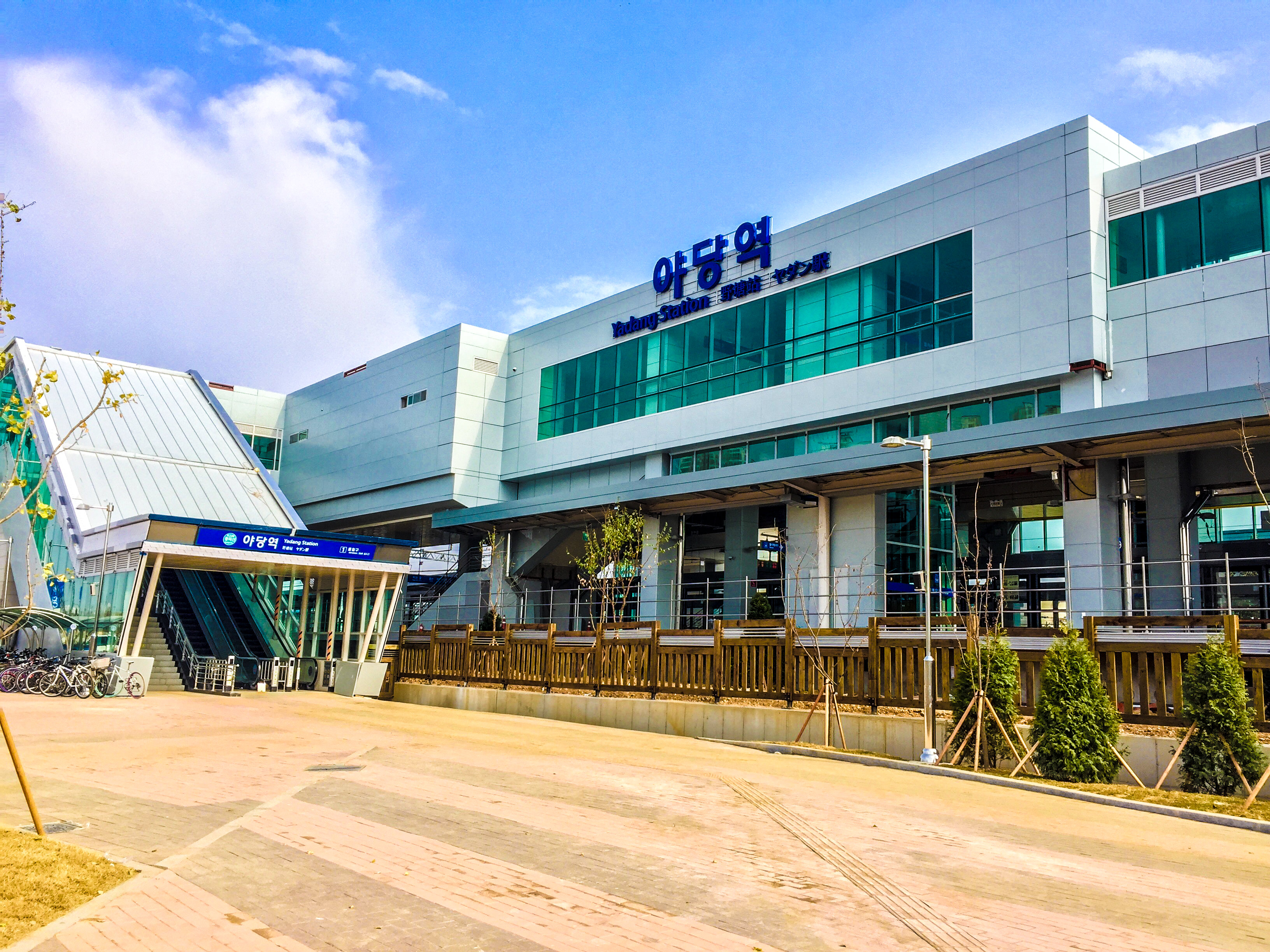

Korean name
- Hangul: 야당역
- Hanja: 野塘驛
- Revised Romanization: Yadangyeok
- McCune–Reischauer: Yadangyŏk

General information
- Location: 1088 Yadang-dong, Paju; Gyeonggi-do
- Coordinates: 37.7129°N 126.7616°E
- Operator: Korail
- Line: Gyeongui–Jungang Line
- Platforms: 2
- Tracks: 2

Construction
- Structure type: Aboveground

History
- Opened: October 31, 2015

Services
Preceding station	Seoul Metropolitan Subway	Following station
Unjeong towards Munsan	Gyeongui–Jungang Line	Tanhyeon towards Jipyeong or Seoul Station
Unjeong towards Munsan	Gyeongui–Jungang Line Gyeongui Express	Tanhyeon towards Yongmun
Unjeong towards Munsan	Gyeongui–Jungang Line Jungang Express	Tanhyeon towards Yongmun
Unjeong towards Munsan	Gyeongui–Jungang Line Gyeongui Express	Tanhyeon towards Seoul Station
Location

Yadang station (Korean: 야당역) is a railway station on the Gyeongui–Jungang Line of the Seoul Metropolitan Subway outside Seoul, South Korea.

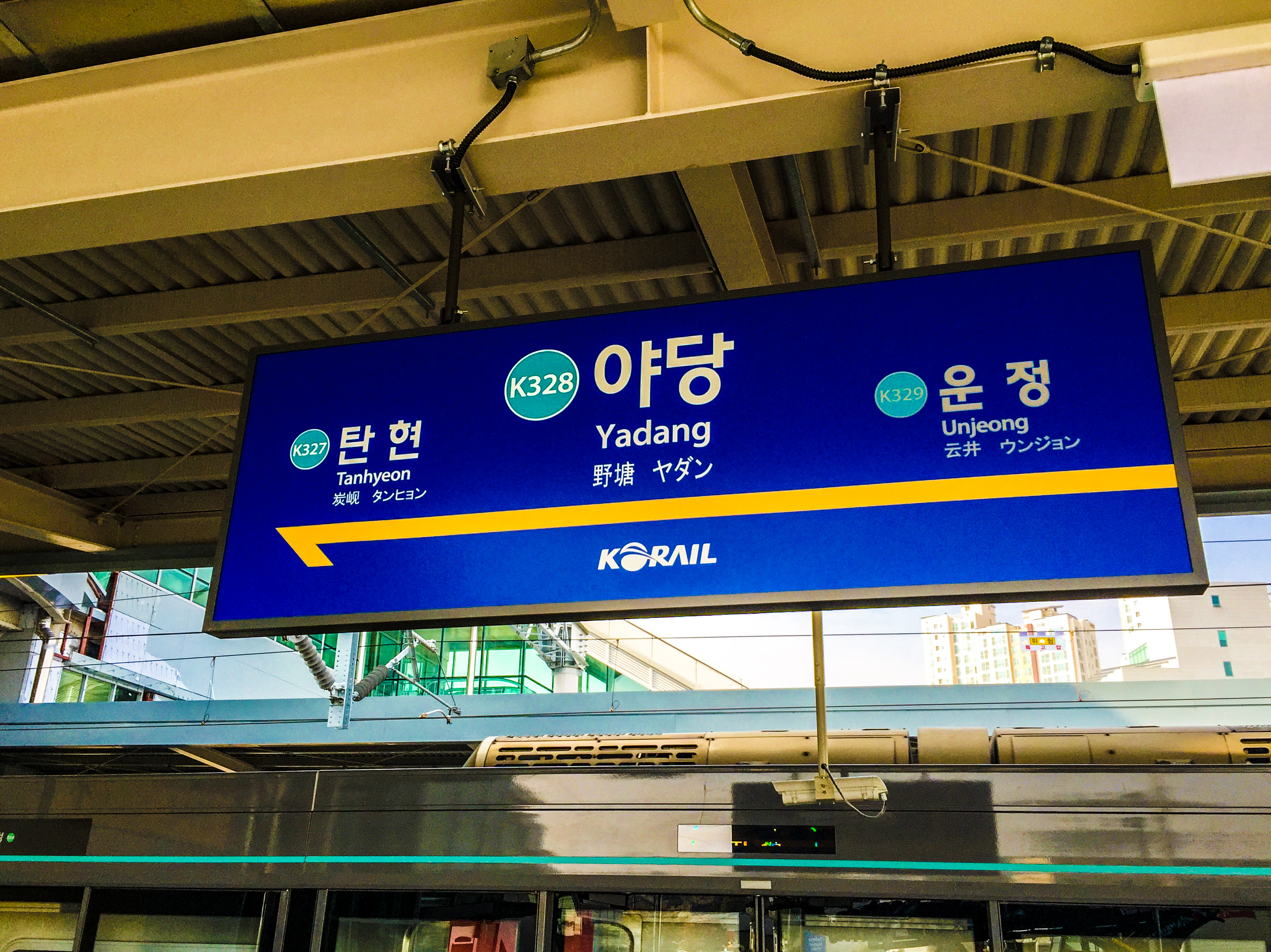

== Connections ==
- G7426
- 567
- 600
- 80
- 075
- 076
- 081
- 083
- 084
- 084 (심야)
- 085
- 086

== Station layout ==
L2; Platforms	Side platform, doors will open on the left
L2; Platforms	Eastbound	Gyeongui–Jungang Line toward Munsan (Unjeong) →
L2; Platforms	Westbound	← Gyeongui–Jungang Line toward Jipyeong (Tanhyeon)
L2; Platforms	Side platform, doors will open on the left

L1; Concourse	Lobby	Customer Service, Shops, Vending machines, ATMs

G	Street level	Exit
