= Gangmae station =

Metro station in Goyang, South Korea

Coordinates: 37.6123°N 126.8435°E

강매 (루트로닉); Gangmae (Lutronic)
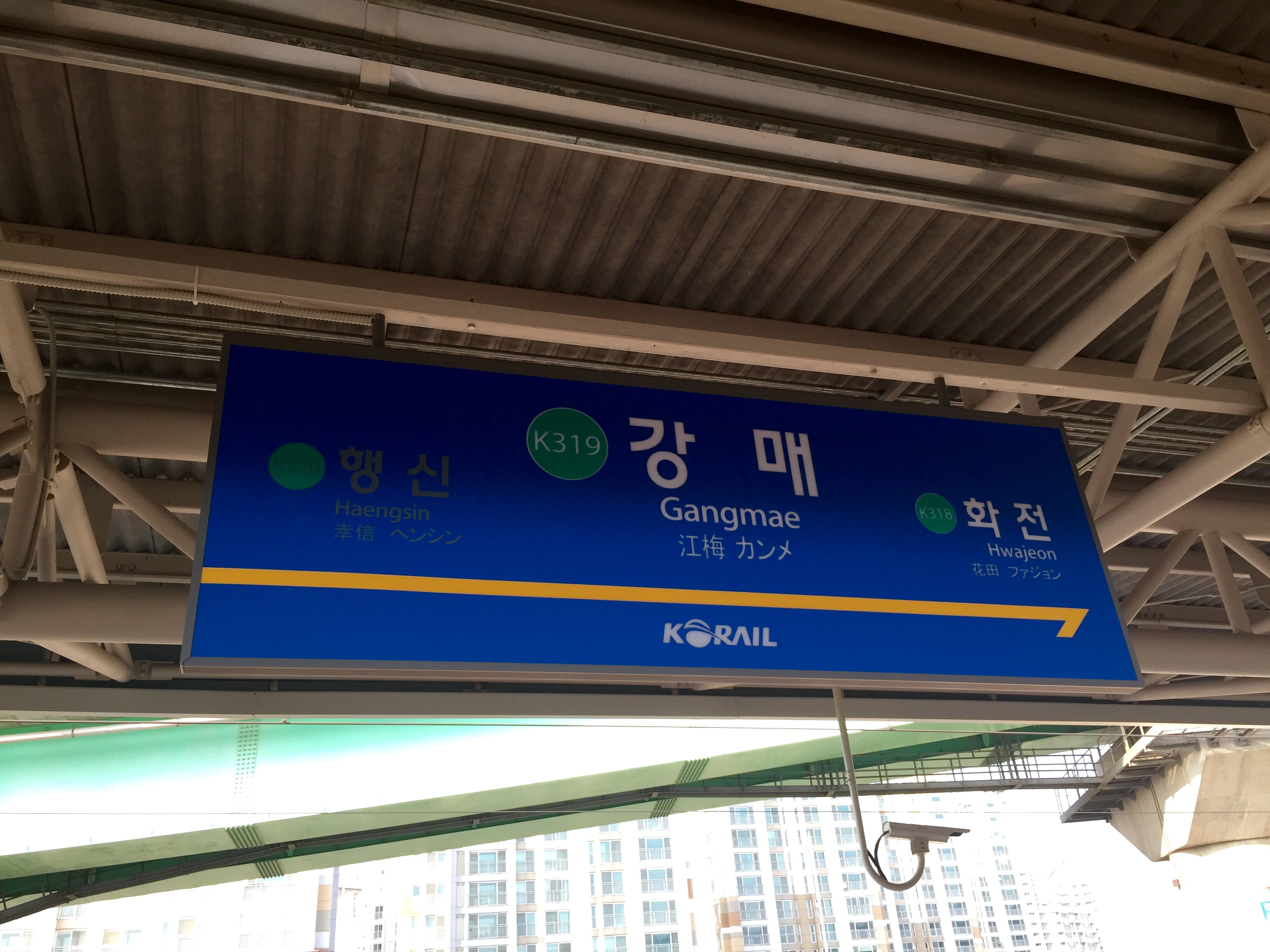

Korean name
- Hangul: 강매역
- Hanja: 江梅驛
- Revised Romanization: Gangmae-yeok
- McCune–Reischauer: Kangmae-yŏk

General information
- Location: 16-2 Gangmae-dong, Deogyang-gu, Goyang, Gyeonggi-do
- Operator: Korail
- Line: Gyeongui–Jungang Line
- Platforms: 2
- Tracks: 4

Construction
- Structure type: Aboveground

Key dates
- October 25, 2014: Gyeongui–Jungang Line opened
Location

Gangmae station is a railway station on the Gyeongui–Jungang Line. It closed July 2009 due to its proximity to Haengsin station but was reconstructed and reopened on October 25, 2014 following the development of the surrounding area.

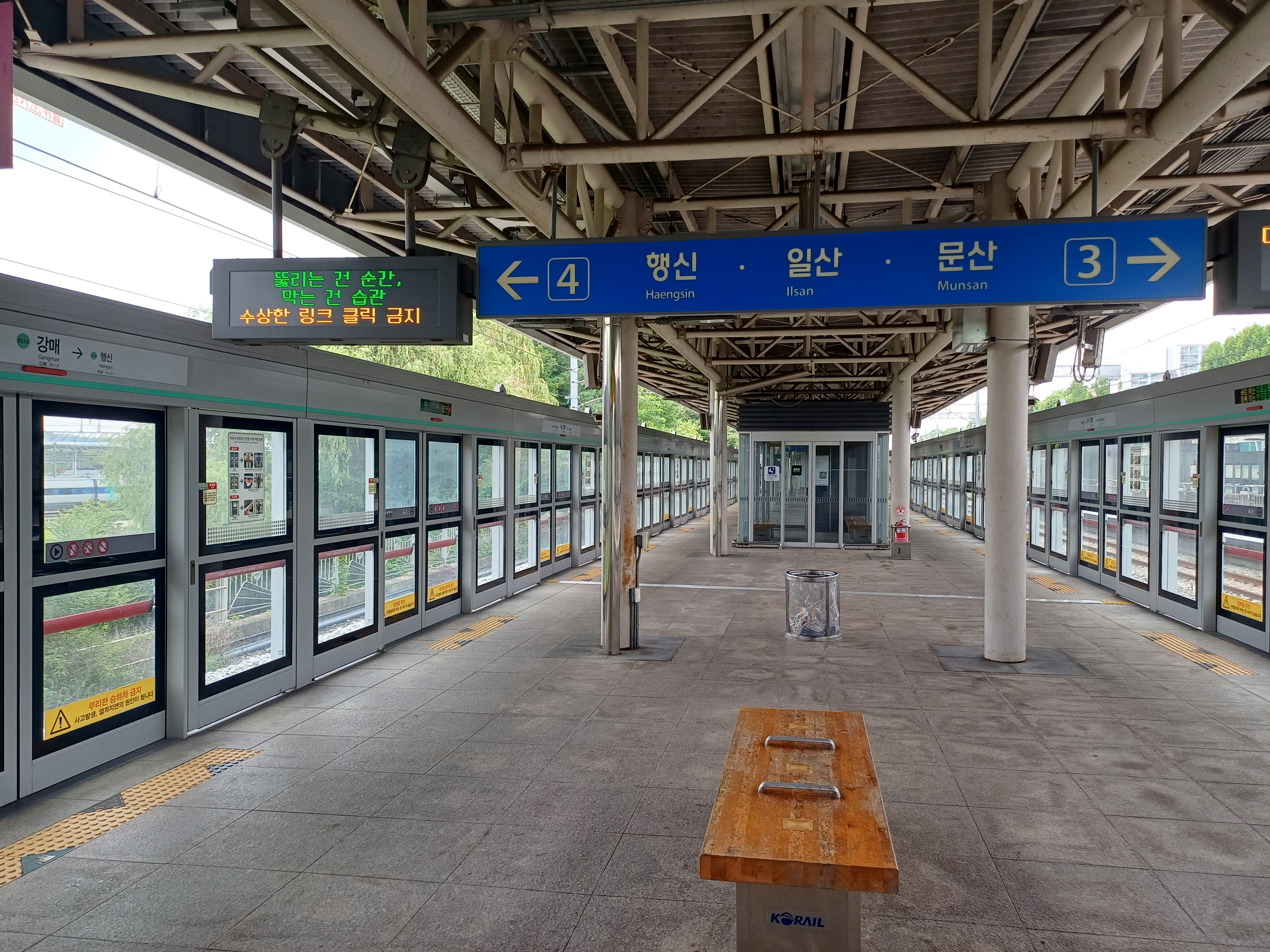
The platforms

Preceding station	Seoul Metropolitan Subway	Following station
Haengsin towards Munsan	Gyeongui–Jungang Line	Korea Aerospace University towards Jipyeong or Seoul Station
Haengsin towards Munsan	Gyeongui–Jungang Line Jungang Express	Korea Aerospace University towards Yongmun
