= Korea Aerospace University station =

Metro station in Goyang, South Korea

한국항공대; Korea Aerospace Univ.
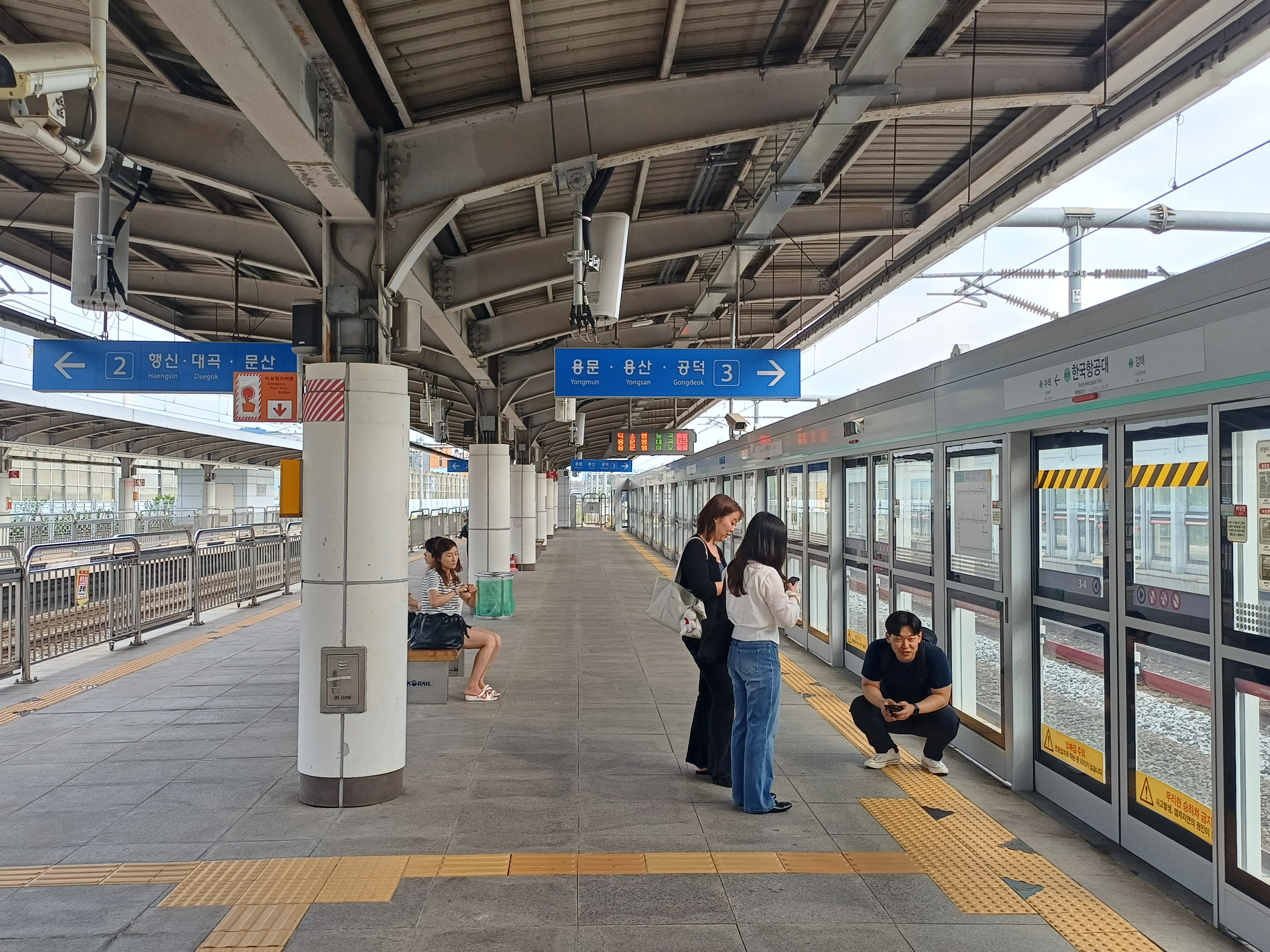
- Station platforms

Korean name
- Hangul: 한국항공대역
- Hanja: 韓國航空大驛
- Revised Romanization: Hangukhanggongdaeyeok
- McCune–Reischauer: Hangukhanggongdaeyŏk

General information
- Location: 183-10 Hwajeon-dong; Deogyang-gu, Goyang; Gyeonggi-do
- Coordinates: 37°36′12.69″N 126°52′3.77″E
- Operator: Korail
- Line: Gyeongui–Jungang Line
- Platforms: 3
- Tracks: 4
- Bus routes: 7728; 9706 9708 9713; 66 76 77-2 770 773 780 800; 6005

Construction
- Structure type: Aboveground

History
- Opened: May 1, 1958

Key dates
- July 1, 2009: Gyeongui–Jungang Line opened
Location

Korea Aerospace University Station is a station on the Gyeongui–Jungang Line. Korea Aerospace University is located nearby.

It was renamed from Hwajeon Station on November 21, 2023.

Preceding station	Seoul Metropolitan Subway	Following station
Gangmae towards Munsan	Gyeongui–Jungang Line	Susaek towards Jipyeong or Seoul Station
Gangmae towards Munsan	Gyeongui–Jungang Line Jungang Express	Susaek towards Yongmun
