= Sinwon station =

Station of the Seoul Metropolitan Subway

신원; Sinwon
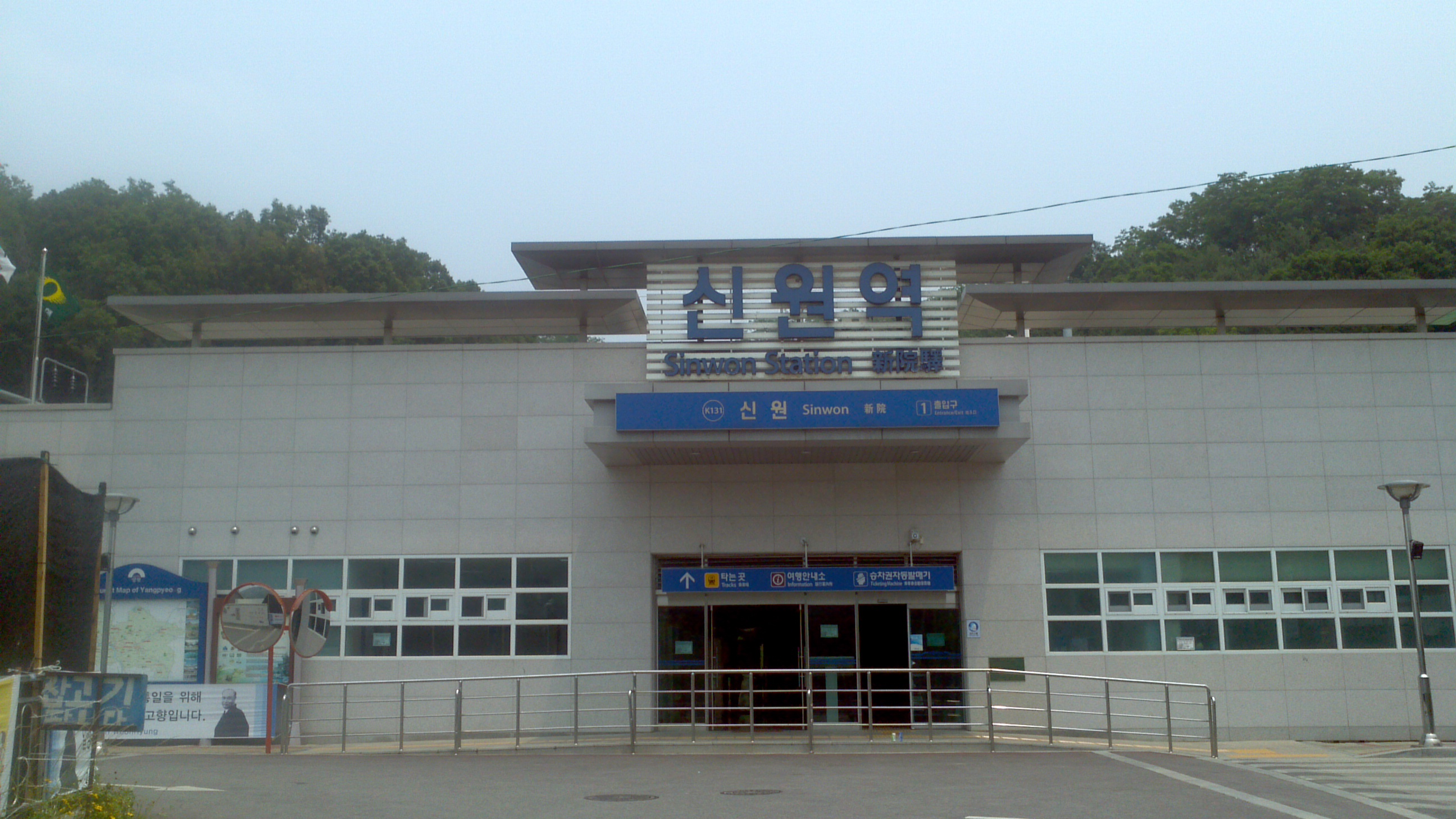

Korean name
- Hangul: 신원역
- Hanja: 新院驛
- Revised Romanization: Sinwonnyeok
- McCune–Reischauer: Sinwŏnnyŏk

General information
- Location: 480-29 Sinwonni, 5-3; Sinwonyeokgil, Yangseo-myeon, Yangpyeong-gun, Gyeonggi-do
- Coordinates: 37°31′34″N 127°22′21″E
- Operator: Korail
- Line: Gyeongui–Jungang Line
- Platforms: 2
- Tracks: 4

Construction
- Structure type: Aboveground

History
- Opened: November 5, 1965

Key dates
- December 23, 2009: Gyeongui–Jungang Line opened
Location

Sinwon station is a station on the Gyeongui–Jungang Line in South Korea.

Preceding station	Seoul Metropolitan Subway	Following station
Yangsu towards Munsan	Gyeongui–Jungang Line	Guksu towards Jipyeong
Yangsu towards Munsan	Gyeongui–Jungang Line Gyeongui Express	Guksu towards Yongmun
