= Geumneung station =

Metro station in Paju, South Korea

금릉; Geumneung
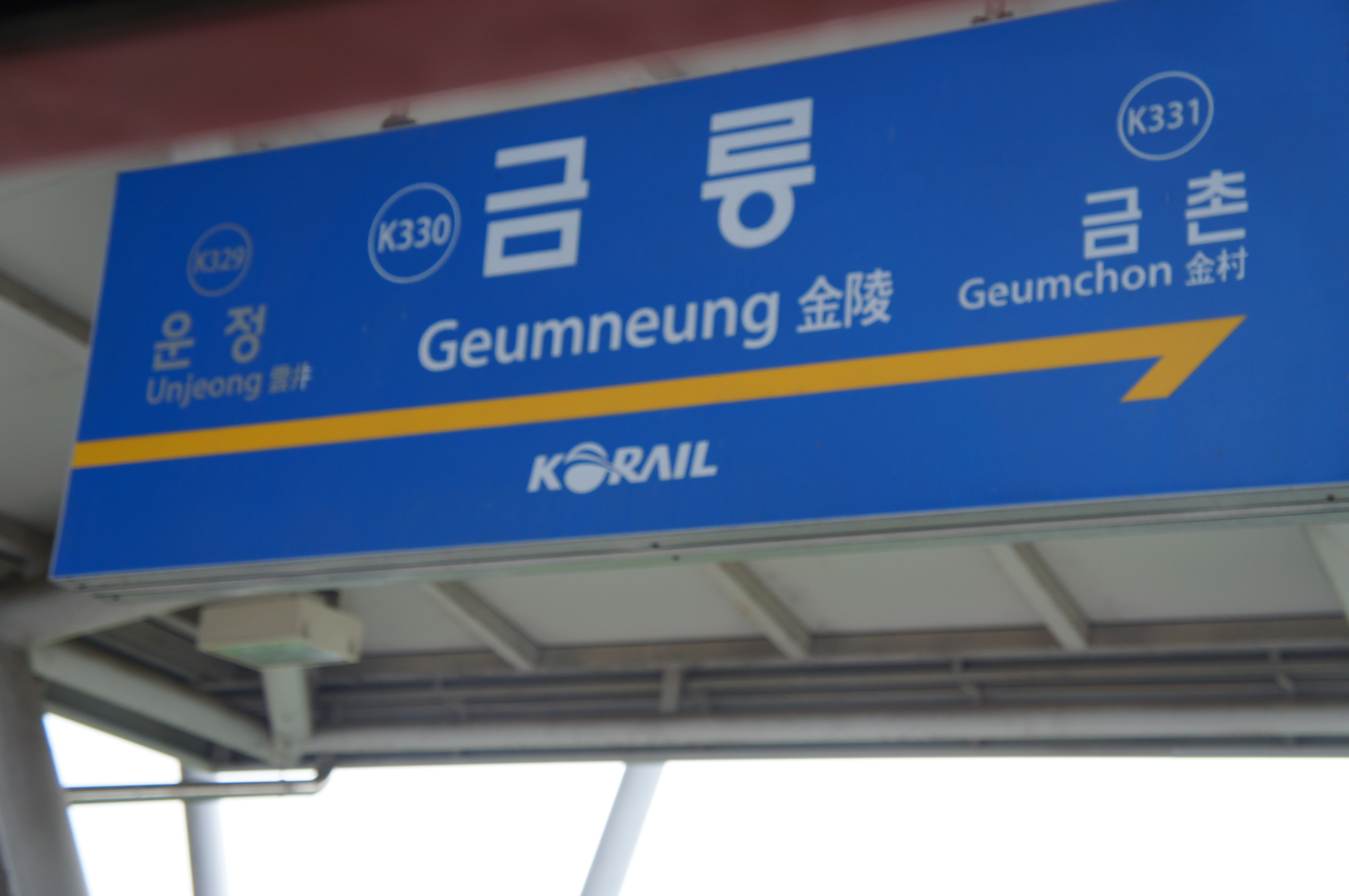

Korean name
- Hangul: 금릉역
- Hanja: 金陵驛
- Revised Romanization: Geumneungyeok
- McCune–Reischauer: Kŭmnŭngyŏk

General information
- Location: 977-1 Geumchon-dong; Paju, Gyeonggi-do
- Coordinates: 37°45′02″N 126°45′58″E
- Operator: Korail
- Line: Gyeongui–Jungang Line
- Platforms: 2
- Tracks: 2
- Bus routes: 030 073 078 085

Construction
- Structure type: Aboveground

History
- Opened: October 31, 2004

Key dates
- July 1, 2009: Gyeongui–Jungang Line started service

Services
Preceding station	Seoul Metropolitan Subway	Following station
Geumchon towards Munsan	Gyeongui–Jungang Line	Unjeong towards Jipyeong or Seoul Station
Geumchon towards Munsan	Gyeongui–Jungang Line Gyeongui Express	Unjeong towards Yongmun
Geumchon towards Munsan	Gyeongui–Jungang Line Jungang Express	Unjeong towards Yongmun
Location

Geumneung Station (Korean: 금릉역) is a railway station on the Gyeongui–Jungang Line. It is located in the Geumchon neighborhood of Paju city, Gyeonggi-do, in the far northern region of South Korea.

Across from the station on one side is Rodeo Street, a large cluster of shops and restaurants (including Chinese, Italian, and Vietnamese eateries) housed in five-story buildings. On the other side of the station lies only a very large rice/vegetable field.

== Station Layout ==
L2; Platforms	Side platform, doors will open on the left
L2; Platforms	Eastbound	Gyeongui–Jungang Line toward Munsan (Geumchon) →
L2; Platforms	Westbound	← Gyeongui–Jungang Line toward Jipyeong (Unjeong)
L2; Platforms	Side platform, doors will open on the left

L1; Concourse	Lobby	Customer Service, Shops, Vending machines, ATMs

G	Street level	Exit
