= Wollong station =

Metro station in Paju, South Korea

월롱 (서영대학교); Wollong (Seoyoung Univ.)
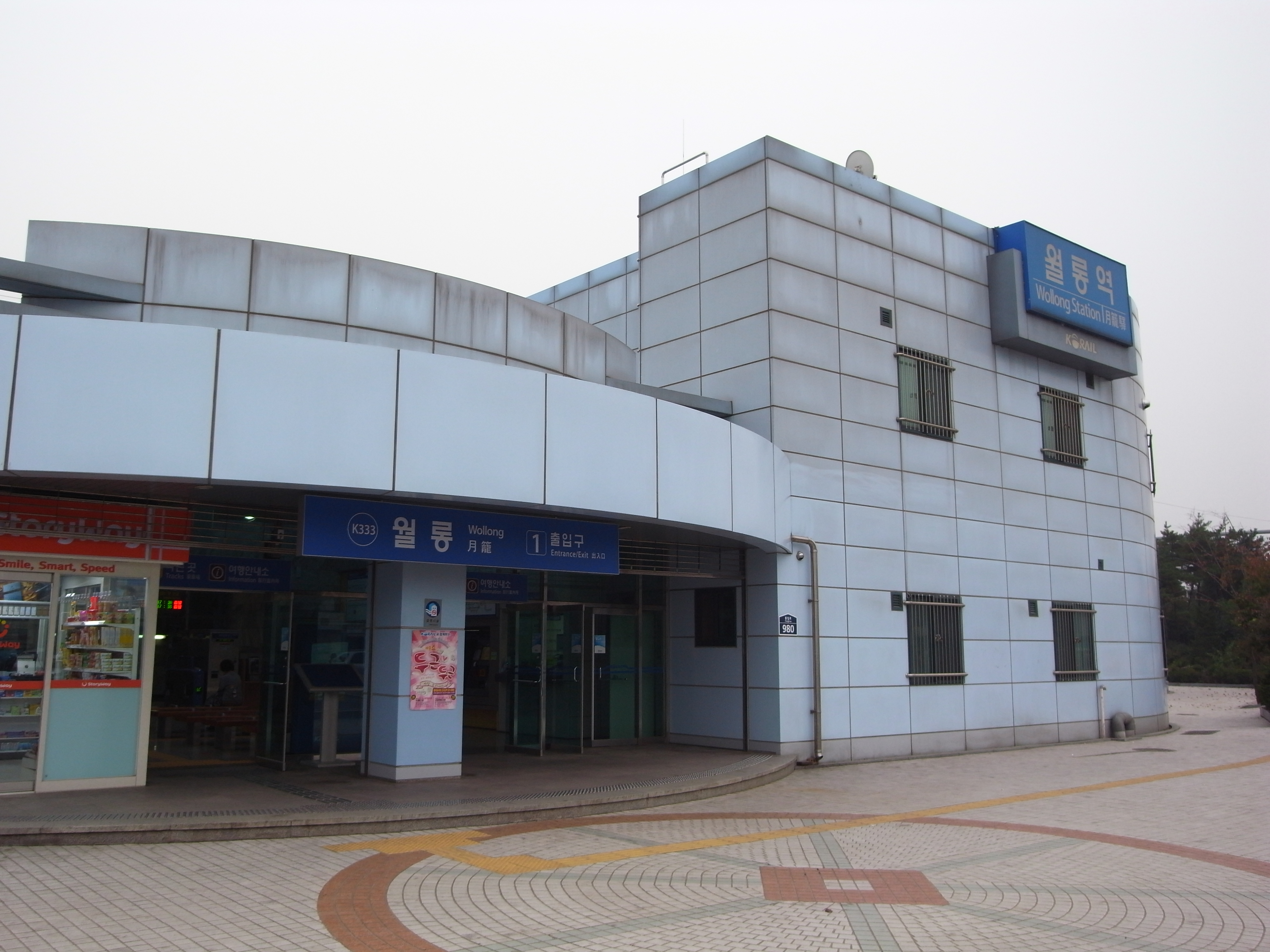

Korean name
- Hangul: 월롱역
- Hanja: 月籠驛
- Revised Romanization: Wollongyeok
- McCune–Reischauer: Wŏllongyŏk

General information
- Location: 168-3 Wijeon-ri; Wollong-myeon, Paju; Gyeonggi-do
- Coordinates: 37°47′43″N 126°47′35″E
- Operator: Korail
- Line: Gyeongui–Jungang Line
- Platforms: 2
- Tracks: 4
- Bus routes: 9710 9710-1; 11-2 17 30 92 92-1 600 021 023 025 069

Construction
- Structure type: Aboveground

History
- Opened: January 17, 1998

Key dates
- July 1, 2009: Gyeongui–Jungang Line started service

Services
Preceding station	Seoul Metropolitan Subway	Following station
Paju towards Munsan	Gyeongui–Jungang Line	Geumchon towards Jipyeong or Seoul Station
Paju towards Munsan	Gyeongui–Jungang Line Jungang Express	Geumchon towards Yongmun
Location

Wollong station (Korean: 월롱역) is a railway station of the Gyeongui–Jungang Line in Wollong-myeon, Paju, Gyeonggi-do, South Korea. Its station subname is Seoyoung Univ., where said university is nearby.

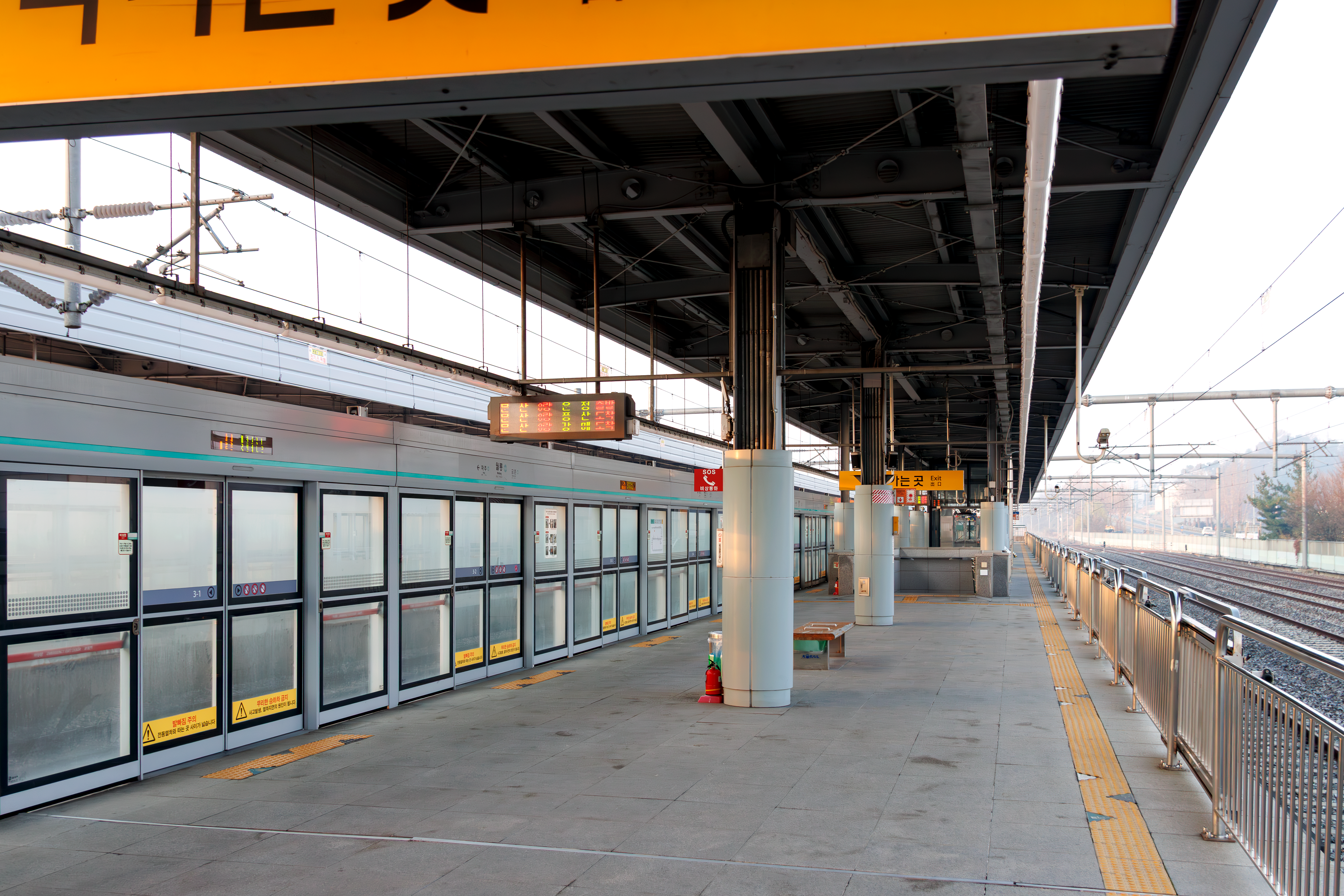
Platform

== Station layout ==
L2; Platforms	Platform 4	(Not in use)
L2; Platforms	Island platform, doors will open on the left and right
L2; Platforms	Platform 3	Gyeongui–Jungang Line toward Munsan (Paju) →
L2; Platforms	Platform 2	← Gyeongui–Jungang Line toward Jipyeong (Geumchon)
L2; Platforms	Island platform, doors will open on the left and right
L2; Platforms	Platform 4	(Not in use)

L1; Concourse	Lobby	Customer Service, Shops, Vending machines, ATMs

G	Street level	Exit
