= Paju station =

Metro station in Paju, South Korea

파주; Paju
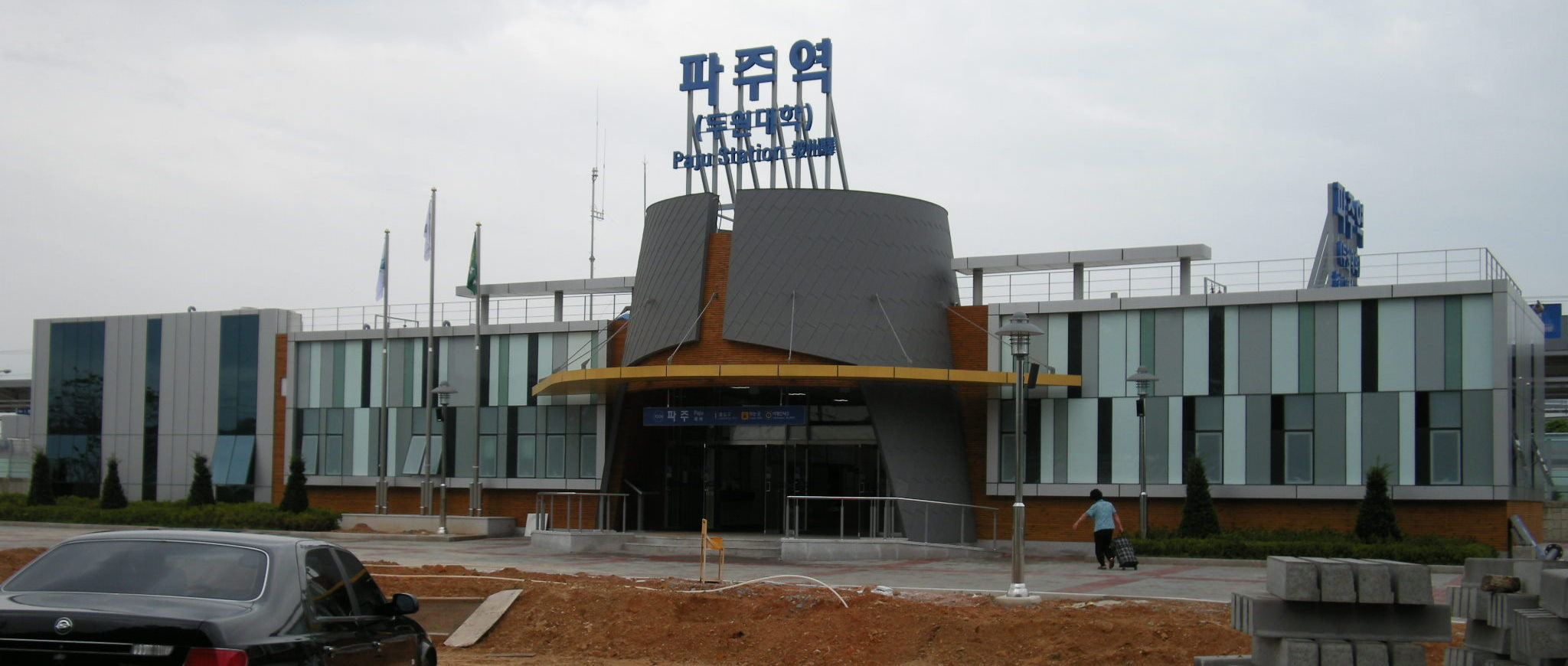

Korean name
- Hangul: 파주역
- Hanja: 坡州驛
- Revised Romanization: Paju-yeok
- McCune–Reischauer: P'aju-yŏk

General information
- Location: 553-3 Bongam-ri; Paju-eup, Paju; Gyeonggi-do
- Coordinates: 37°48′54″N 126°47′34″E
- Operator: Korail
- Line: Gyeongui–Jungang Line
- Platforms: 2
- Tracks: 4
- Bus routes: 30 600 017

Construction
- Structure type: Ground

History
- Opened: August 21, 1965

Key dates
- July 1, 2009: Gyeongui–Jungang Line started service

Services
Preceding station	Seoul Metropolitan Subway	Following station
Munsan Terminus	Gyeongui–Jungang Line	Wollong towards Jipyeong or Seoul Station
Munsan Terminus	Gyeongui–Jungang Line Jungang Express	Wollong towards Yongmun
Location

Paju station (Korean: 파주역) is a railway station of the Gyeongui–Jungang Line in Paju-eup, Paju, Gyeonggi-do, South Korea.

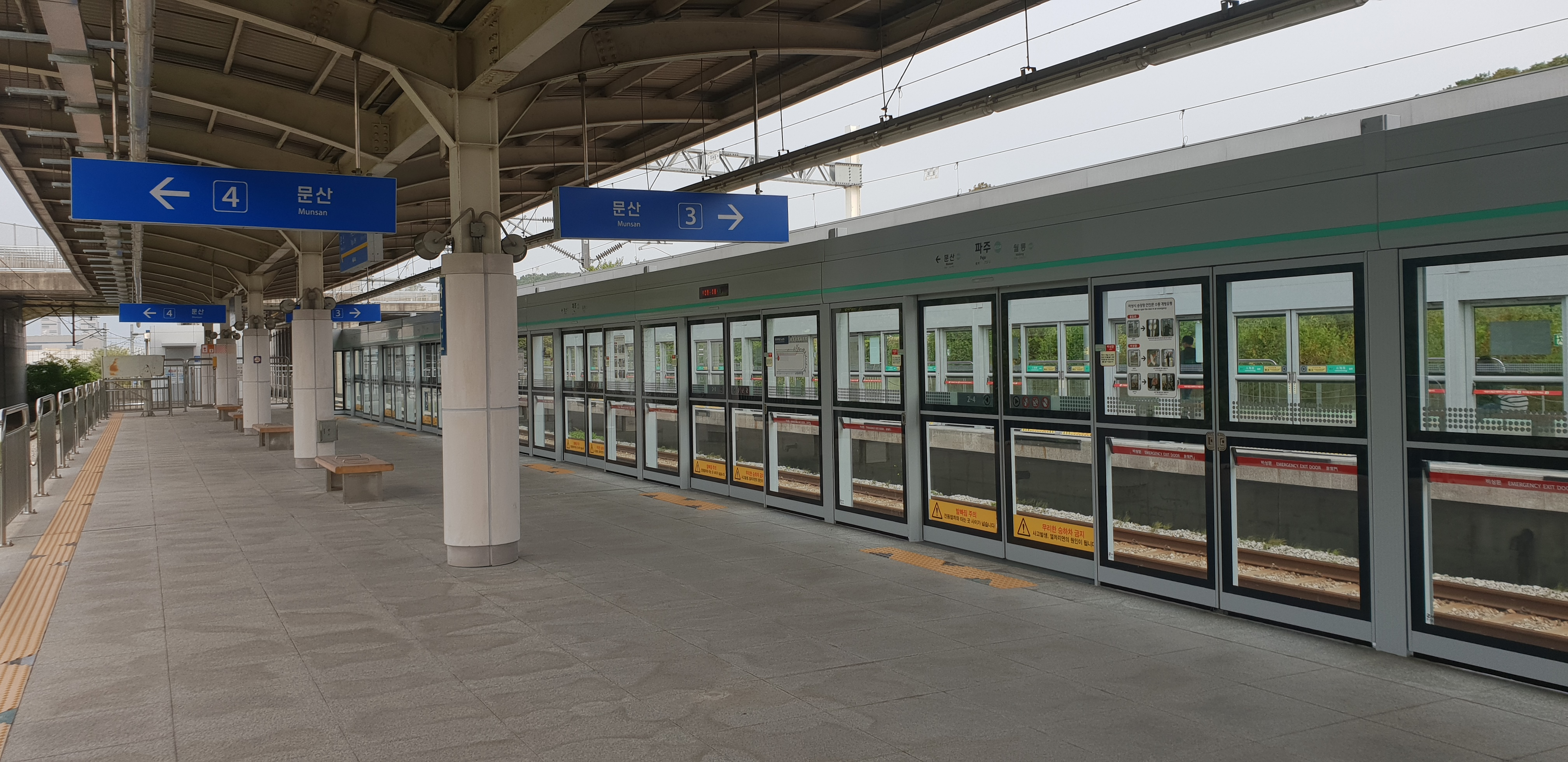
Platform

== History ==
- August 21, 1965: A station-free batch station.
- Jan. 17, 1998: All services moved to the current station.
- June 1, 2000: The station was temporarily closed due to flood damage prevention work in Munsan District.
- July 1, 2009: The station became a part of Seoul Metropolitan Subway.

== Station layout ==
L2; Platforms	Platform 4	(Not in use)
L2; Platforms	Island platform, doors will open on the left and right
L2; Platforms	Platform 3	Gyeongui–Jungang Line toward Munsan (Terminus) →
L2; Platforms	Platform 2	← Gyeongui–Jungang Line toward Jipyeong (Wollong)
L2; Platforms	Island platform, doors will open on the left and right
L2; Platforms	Platform 1	(Not in use)

L1; Concourse	Lobby	Customer Service, Shops, Vending machines, ATMs

G	Street level	Exit

== Around the station ==
- Doowon Technical University College
