= Dosim station =

Train station in Namyangju, South Korea

도심; Dosim
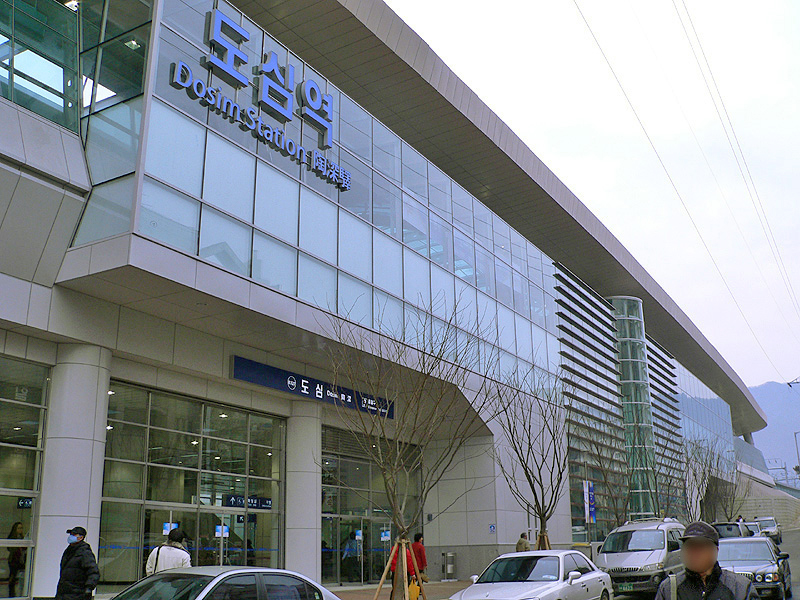

Korean name
- Hangul: 도심역
- Hanja: 陶深驛
- Revised Romanization: Dosim-yeok
- McCune–Reischauer: Tosim-yŏk

General information
- Location: 1024-2 Deoksori, 237 Deoksoro, Wabu-eup, Namyangju-si, Gyeonggi-do
- Coordinates: 37°34′48″N 127°13′21″E
- Operator: Korail
- Line: Gyeongui–Jungang Line
- Platforms: 2
- Tracks: 2

Construction
- Structure type: Aboveground

Key dates
- December 27, 2007: Gyeongui–Jungang Line opened
Location

Dosim Station is a station on the Gyeongui–Jungang Line in Namyangju.

Preceding station	Seoul Metropolitan Subway	Following station
Deokso towards Munsan	Gyeongui–Jungang Line	Paldang towards Jipyeong
Deokso towards Munsan	Gyeongui–Jungang Line Gyeongui Express	Paldang towards Yongmun
Deokso towards Munsan	Gyeongui–Jungang Line Jungang Express	Yangsu towards Yongmun
