= Wondeok station =

Station of the Seoul Metropolitan Subway

원덕; Wondeok
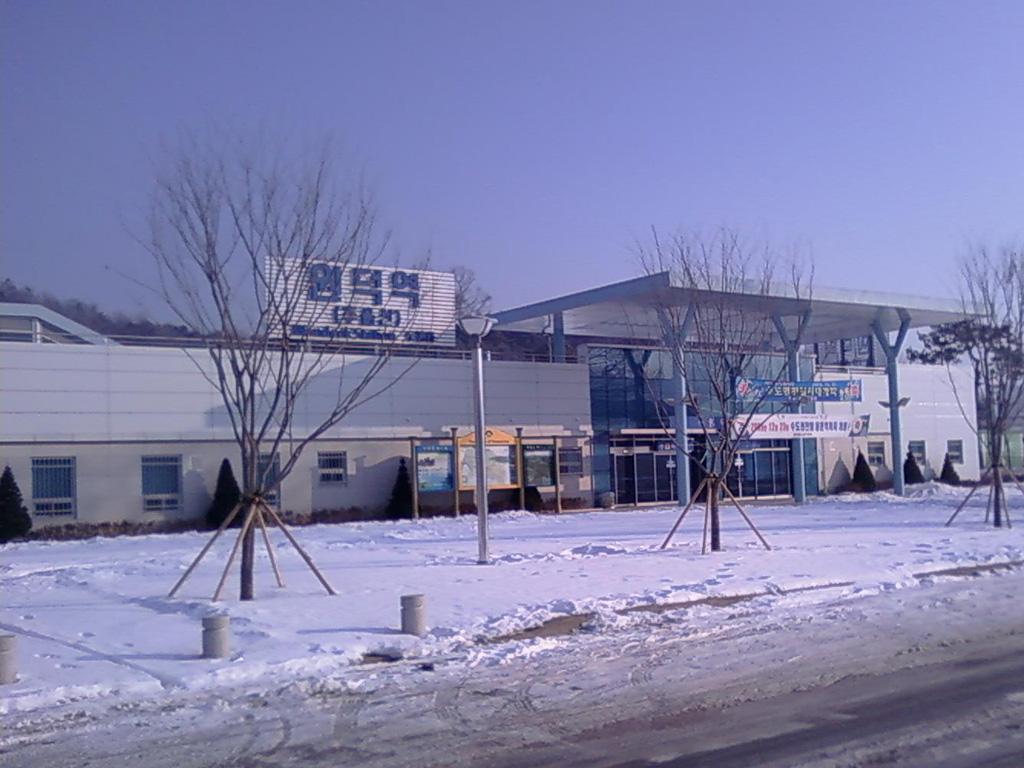

Korean name
- Hangul: 원덕역
- Hanja: 元德驛
- Revised Romanization: Wondeongnyeok
- McCune–Reischauer: Wŏndŏngnyŏk

General information
- Location: 302 Wondeongni, 136 Wondeok-heukcheongil, Yangpyeong-eup, Yangpyeong-gun, Gyeonggi-do
- Coordinates: 37°28′07″N 127°32′50″E
- Operator: Korail
- Line: Gyeongui–Jungang Line
- Platforms: 2
- Tracks: 4

Construction
- Structure type: Aboveground

History
- Opened: April 1, 1940

Key dates
- December 23, 2009: Gyeongui–Jungang Line opened
Location

Wondeok station is a station on the Gyeongui–Jungang Line in South Korea.

Preceding station	Seoul Metropolitan Subway	Following station
Yangpyeong towards Munsan	Gyeongui–Jungang Line	Yongmun towards Jipyeong
Yangpyeong towards Munsan	Gyeongui–Jungang Line Gyeongui Express	Yongmun Terminus
