= Geumchon station =

Metro station in Paju, South Korea

금촌; Geumchon
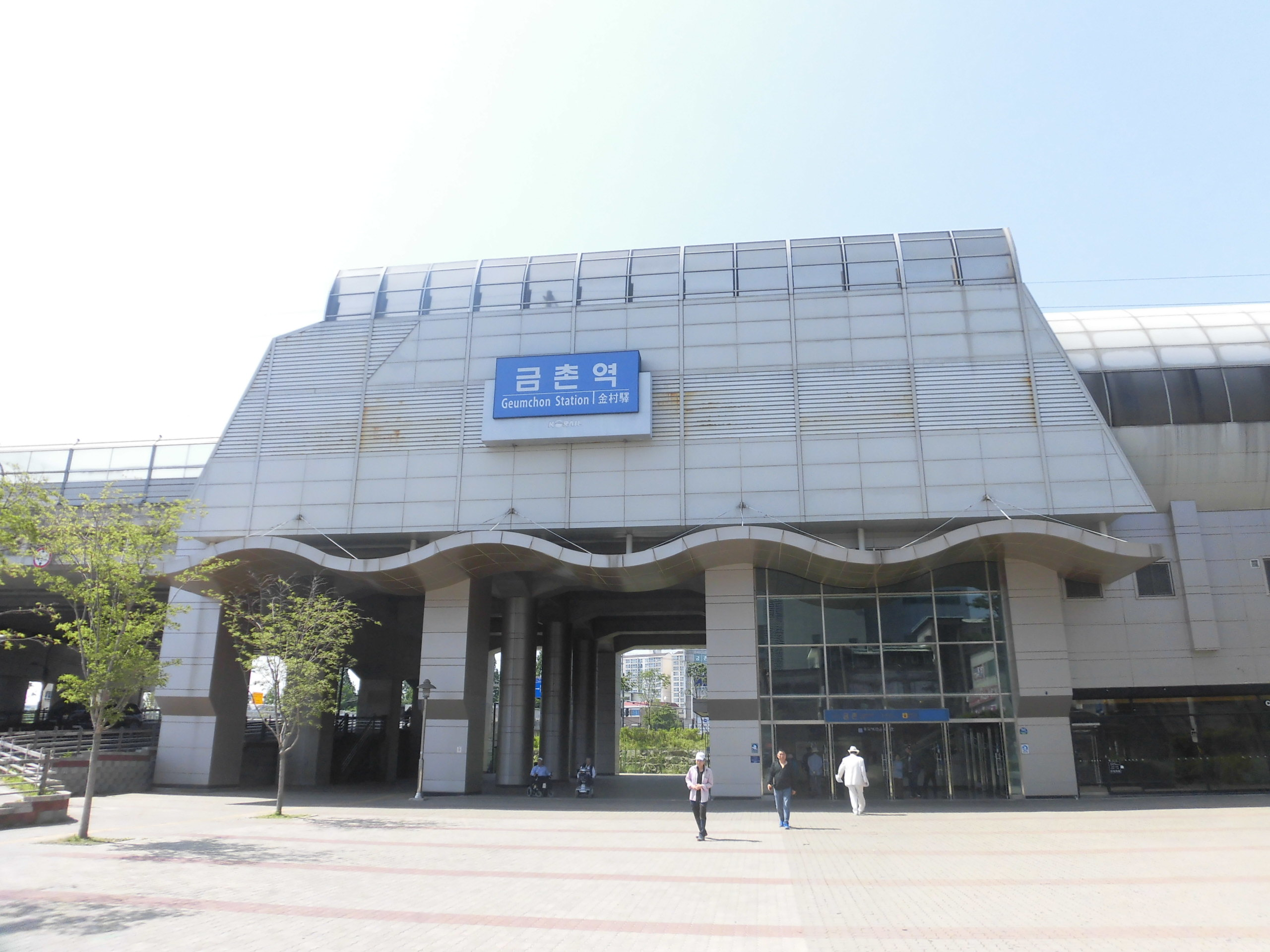

Korean name
- Hangul: 금촌역
- Hanja: 金村驛
- Revised Romanization: Geumchonnyeok
- McCune–Reischauer: Kŭmch'onnyŏk

General information
- Location: 329-355 Geumchon-dong; Paju, Gyeonggi-do
- Coordinates: 37°45′57″N 126°46′26″E
- Operator: Korail
- Line: Gyeongui–Jungang Line
- Platforms: 2
- Tracks: 4
- Bus routes: 7101 7700 7701 9709; 9 10 11-2 17 38 75 75-1 75-2 75-3 77 77-1 77-2 90 92 92-1 150 567 600 799 900 021 022 025 030 032 033 034 034-1 036 062 064 064(쌍둥이) 064(재활용) 065 065(봉고) 065(봉중) 065(봉중하교) 066 068 073 078 085

Construction
- Structure type: Aboveground

History
- Opened: April 3, 1906

Key dates
- July 1, 2009: Gyeongui–Jungang Line started service

Services
Preceding station	Seoul Metropolitan Subway	Following station
Wollong towards Munsan	Gyeongui–Jungang Line	Geumneung towards Jipyeong or Seoul Station
Munsan Terminus	Gyeongui–Jungang Line Gyeongui Express	Geumneung towards Yongmun
Wollong towards Munsan	Gyeongui–Jungang Line Jungang Express	Geumneung towards Yongmun
Munsan Terminus	Gyeongui–Jungang Line Gyeongui Express	Unjeong towards Seoul Station
Location

Geumchon Station (Korean: 금촌역) is a railway station of the Gyeongui–Jungang Line in Geumchon-dong, Paju, Gyeonggi-do, South Korea.

== History ==
- April 4, 1906: Opened as a regular station.
- April 22, 2008: All services move to the new location.
- October 19, 2008: The old station demolished
- July 1, 2009: The station became a part of Seoul Metropolitan Subway

== Station Layout ==
L1; Platforms	Platform 4	(Not in use)
L1; Platforms	Island platform, doors will open on the left and right
L1; Platforms	Platform 3	Gyeongui–Jungang Line toward Munsan (Wollong) →
L1; Platforms	Platform 2	← Gyeongui–Jungang Line toward Jipyeong (Geumneung)
L1; Platforms	Island platform, doors will open on the left and right
L1; Platforms	Platform 1	(Not in use)

L1; Concourse	Lobby	Customer Service, Shops, Vending machines, ATMs

G	Street level	Exit

== Gallery ==
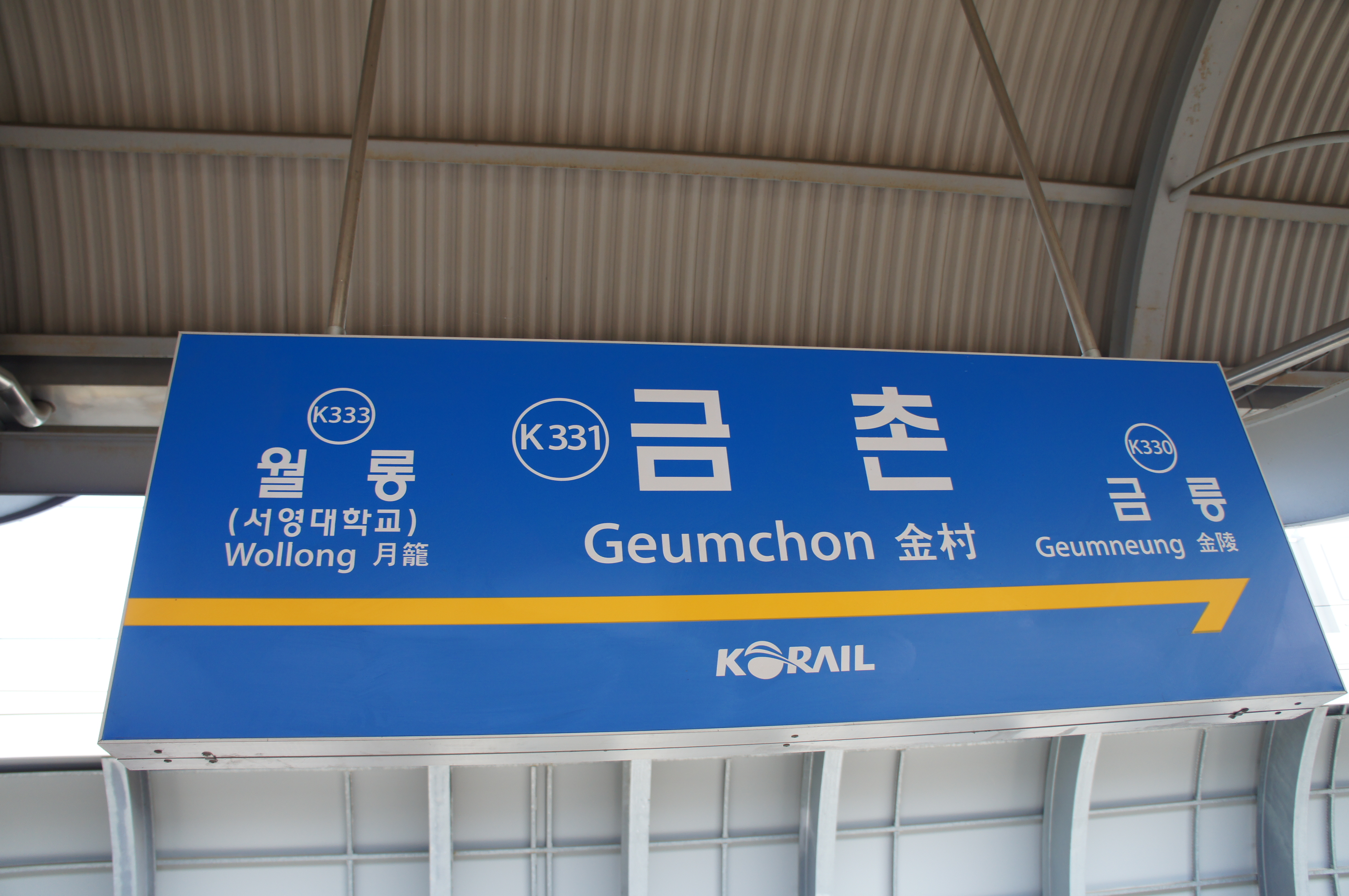
Station Sign

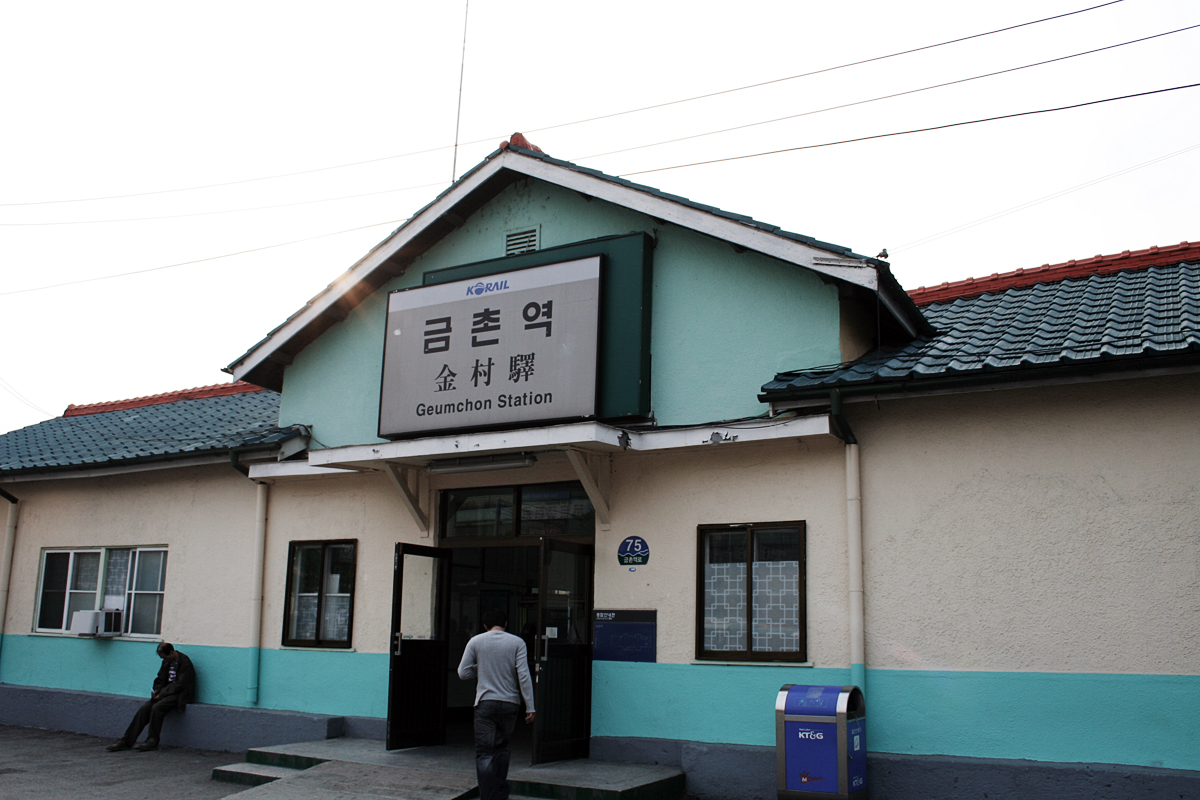
Old Geumchon station
