= Dosim =

Dosim may refer to:

== Places ==
- Seoul dosim (Korean: 도심; Hanja: 都心), the original city centre of Seoul, South Korea
- Dosim station (Korean: 도심; Hanja: 陶深), a metro station in Namyangju, Gyeonggi, South Korea

== People ==
- Dosim (monk) (Korean: 도심; Hanja: 道深), Korean Buddhist monk in Korea's Three Kingdoms Era.
