= Gyeongui–Jungang Line =

Railway line in Gyeonggi-do and Seoul, South Korea

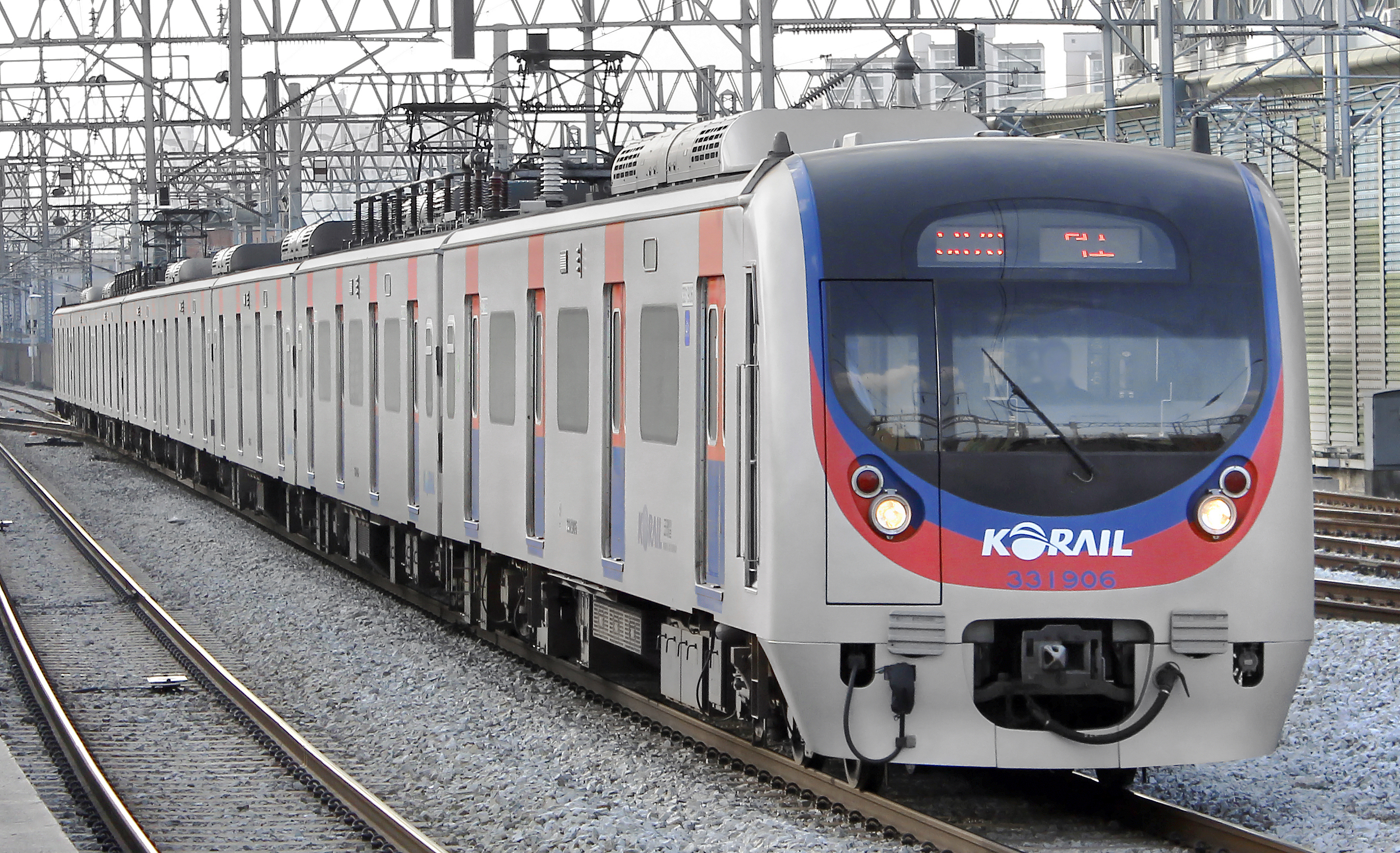

Overview
- Native name: 경의·중앙선(京義·中央線); Gyeongui-Jungang-seon
- Status: Operational
- Termini: Munsan (most trains) or Imjingang (shuttle service); Yongmun (most trains) or Jipyeong or Seoul Station (select trains)
- Stations: 57

Service
- Type: Commuter rail
- System: Seoul Metropolitan Subway
- Operator: Korail
- Depot(s): Munsan Depot, Yongmun Depot
- Rolling stock: Korail Class 321000 (21 trains); Korail Class 331000 (27 trains)

History
- Opened: 27 December 2014

Technical
- Line length: 132.5 km (82.3 mi)
- Num of tracks: 2 (Munsan–Neunggok, Gajwa–Jipyeong, Gajwa–Seoul Station); 4 (Neunggok–Gajwa)
- Track gauge: 1,435 mm (4 ft 8 1/2 in)
- Electrification: 25 kV AC 60 Hz

The Gyeongui–Jungang Line is a commuter rail service of the Seoul Metropolitan Subway system, operating on trackage from the Gyeongui Line (opened on July 1, 2009) and the Jungang Line (opened on December 16, 2005).

Frequent service is provided between Munsan and Yongmun by 8-car trains, with 6 trains weekdays and 5 on weekends running one station east of Yongmun to Jipyeong. However, some services (run by 4-car trains) split for Seoul Station east of Gajwa. Additionally, many trains terminate at various locations on the line such as Ilsan, Neunggok, Daegok, Yongsan, Cheongnyangni, Deokso, and Paldang.

Trains travel along the Gyeongui (Munsan-Seoul Station/Gajwa), Yongsan (Gajwa-Yongsan), Gyeongwon (Yongsan-Hoegi), and Jungang (Hoegi-Jipyeong) lines.

The line runs on the left-hand side of the track, like all other Korail-run Seoul Metropolitan Subway lines.

Travel time is approximately 3 hours all the way and many express services cut the time to 2 hours and 15 minutes.

The color shown on the map is jade.

== History ==
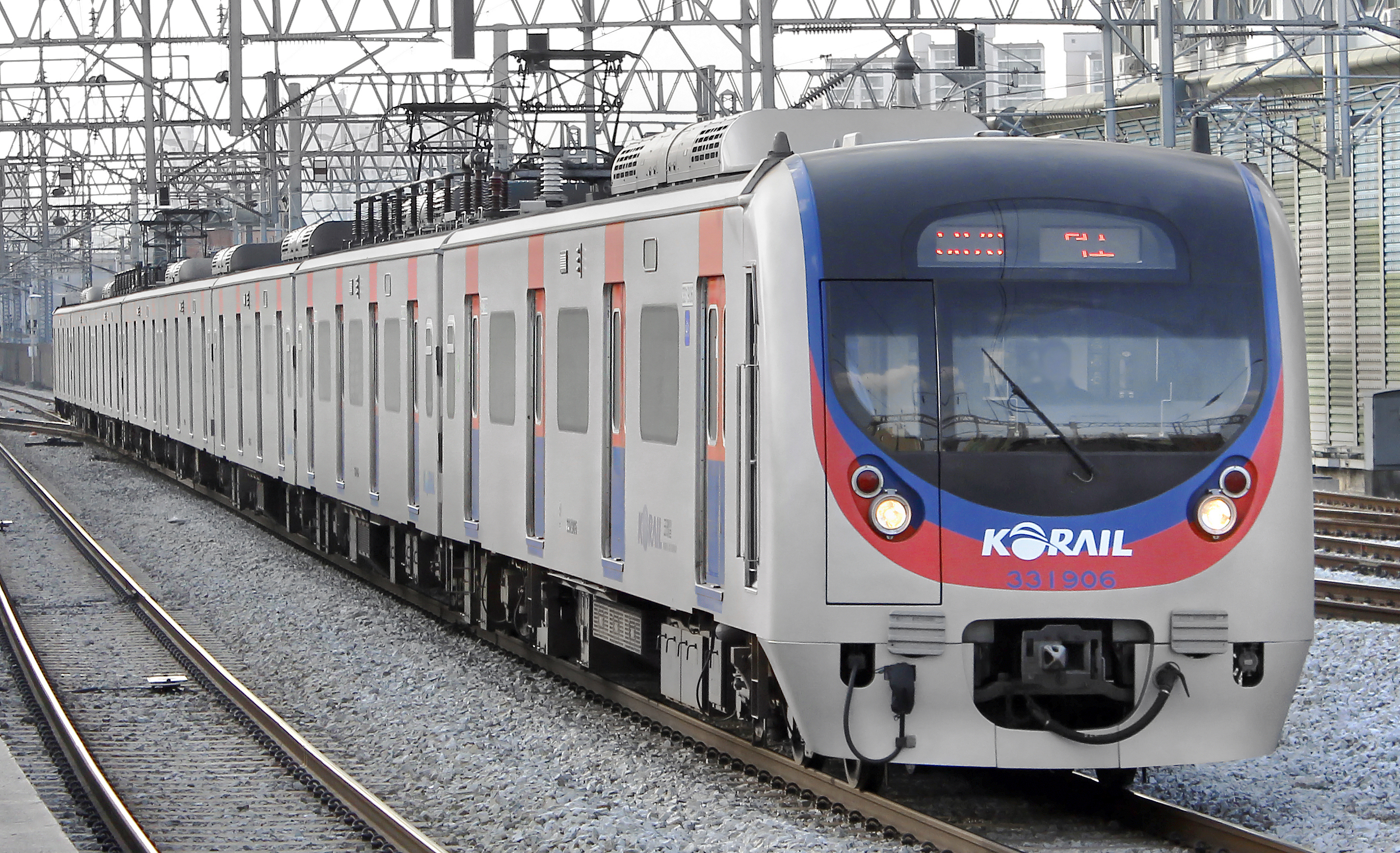
A Class 331000 train bound for Deokso station arriving at Sangbong station.

16 December 2005	The Jungang Line section is officially opened from Yongsan to Deokso as the Yongsan-Deokso Line.
27 December 2007	The Jungang Line section is extended eastward from Deokso to Paldang. The Yongsan-Deokso Line is renamed to the Jungang Line.
29 December 2008	The Jungang Line section is extended eastward from Paldang to Guksu.
1 July 2009	The Gyeongui Line section is officially opened from Munsan to Digital Media City as the Gyeongui Line, with a spur line to Seoul Station.
23 December 2009	The Jungang Line section is extended eastward from Guksu to Yongmun. Sinwon station is opened as an in-fill station on the Jungang Line section.
21 December 2010	Sangbong station and Obin station open as in-fill stations on the Jungang Line section.
15 December 2012	The Gyeongui Line section's main line is extended eastward from Digital Media City to Gongdeok.
25 October 2014	Gangmae station opens as an in-fill station on the Gyeongui Line section.
27 December 2014	The Gyeongui Line section is extended eastward from Gongdeok to Yongsan, and the present Gyeongui-Jungang Line is formed after Gyeongui and Jungang lines are merged.
31 October 2015	Yadang station opens as an in-fill station.
30 April 2016	Hyochang Park station opens as an in-fill station.
21 January 2017	The line is extended eastward from Yongmun to Jipyeong.
28 March 2020	A shuttle service began operating between Munsan and Imjingang.
5 January 2021	Express service is modified, with all trains running express on the Gyeongui Line portion of the line now stopping at Yadang and Tanhyeon, and all main line trains running express on the Gyeongui Line portion stopping at Unjeong.
11 December 2021	Another shuttle service began operating between Imjingang and Dorasan, finally replacing "Commuter Train" service along the whole Gyeongui Line.
17 December 2022	Uncheon station opens as an in-fill station between Imjingang and Munsan after being relocated.
10 April 2026	The Imjingang-Dorasan shuttle was replaced by the DMZ Peace Train, now running to Seoul Station.

=== Future Plans ===
An in-fill station at Hyang-dong, between Korea Aerospace University and Susaek, is expected to open in 2025.

== Rapid (Express) trains ==
Korail operates a variety of express "rapid" (급행) trains for regional services on the Gyeongui–Jungang Line. These services include:

- Gyeongui Line express services via the Seoul Station branch, operating express between Munsan and Gajwa and then continuing as local trains to Seoul Station.
- Gyeongui Line express services via the Yongsan Line, operating express between Munsan and Yongsan and then continuing as local trains on the Jungang Line (east of Yongsan).
- Jungang Line express services, operating express between Yongmun and Yongsan and then continuing as local trains on the Gyeongui Line (west of Yongsan).

== Stations ==
GY: Gyeongui Line Express, via the Yongsan Line
GS: Gyeongui Line Express, to Seoul Station via Sinchon station
J: Jungang Line Express

=== Current Routes ===
- Munsan — Yongmun (most trains)
- Munsan — Seoul Station/Deokso/Paldang/Jipyeong (selected trains)
- Munsan — Imjingang (I shuttle)
- Munsan — Yongmun (GY express, Yongsan — Yongmun all stops)
- Munsan — Seoul Station (GS express)
- Munsan — Yongmun (J express, Munsan — Ichon all stops)

=== Main Line ===
●	stops at the station
▲	some trains stop at the station
｜	does not stop at the station

Station Number	Station Name English	Station Name Hangul	Station Name Hanja	GY	GS	J	Transfer		Distance in km	Total Distance	Location	
K335	Munsan	문산	文山	●	●	Makes all stops	(shuttle for Imjingang)		---	0.0	Gyeonggi Province	Paju
K334	Paju	파주 (두원대학)	坡州 (斗源大學)	｜	｜	Makes all stops			4.4	4.4	Gyeonggi Province	Paju
K333	Wollong	월롱	月籠	｜	｜	Makes all stops			2.2	6.6	Gyeonggi Province	Paju
K331	Geumchon	금촌	金村	●	●	Makes all stops			4.1	10.7	Gyeonggi Province	Paju
K330	Geumneung	금릉	金陵	●	｜	Makes all stops			2.1	12.8	Gyeonggi Province	Paju
K329	Unjeong	운정	雲井	●	●	Makes all stops			3.1	15.9	Gyeonggi Province	Paju
K328	Yadang	야당	野塘	●	●	Makes all stops			1.5	17.4	Gyeonggi Province	Paju
K327	Tanhyeon	탄현	炭峴	●	●	Makes all stops			2.1	19.5	Gyeonggi Province	Goyang Ilsanseo-gu
K326	Ilsan	일산	一山	●	●	Makes all stops	Seohae (shared)		1.7	21.2	Gyeonggi Province	Goyang Ilsanseo-gu
K325	Pungsan	풍산	楓山	｜	｜	Makes all stops	Seohae (shared)		1.9	23.1	Gyeonggi Province	Goyang Ilsandong-gu
K324	Baengma	백마	白馬	●	●	Makes all stops	Seohae (shared)		1.7	24.8	Gyeonggi Province	Goyang Ilsandong-gu
K323	Goksan	곡산	谷山	｜	｜	Makes all stops	Seohae (shared)		1.5	26.3	Gyeonggi Province	Goyang Ilsandong-gu
K322	Daegok	대곡	大谷	●	●	Makes all stops	Seohae (shared)	Great Train eXpress	1.8	28.1	Gyeonggi Province	Goyang Deogyang-gu
K321	Neunggok	능곡	陵谷	｜	｜	Makes all stops	Seohae Line		1.8	29.9	Gyeonggi Province	Goyang Deogyang-gu
K320	Haengsin	행신	幸信	●	●	Makes all stops	KTX		1.5	31.4	Gyeonggi Province	Goyang Deogyang-gu
K319	Gangmae	강매	江梅	｜	｜	Makes all stops			0.9	32.3	Gyeonggi Province	Goyang Deogyang-gu
K318	Korea Aerospace University	한국항공대	韓國航空大	｜	｜	Makes all stops			2.5	34.8	Gyeonggi Province	Goyang Deogyang-gu
K317	Susaek	수색	水色	｜	｜	Makes all stops			3.4	38.2	Seoul	Eunpyeong-gu
K316	Digital Media City	디지털미디어시티	디지털미디어시티	●	●	Makes all stops	Seoul Subway Line 6 AREX		0.6	38.8	Seoul	Eunpyeong-gu
K315	Gajwa	가좌	加佐	●	●	Makes all stops	(for Seoul Station)		1.7	40.5	Seoul	Seodaemun-gu
K314	Hongik Univ.	홍대입구	弘大入口	●	No service	Makes all stops	Seoul Subway Line 2 AREX		1.7	42.2	Seoul	Mapo-gu
K313	Sogang Univ.	서강대	西江大	｜	No service	Makes all stops			0.9	43.1	Seoul	Mapo-gu
K312	Gongdeok	공덕	孔德	●	No service	Makes all stops	Seoul Subway Line 5 Seoul Subway Line 6 AREX		1.9	45.0	Seoul	Mapo-gu
K311	Hyochang Park	효창공원앞	孝昌公園앞	｜	No service	Makes all stops	Seoul Subway Line 6		0.7	45.7	Seoul	Yongsan-gu
K110	Yongsan	용산	龍山	●	No service	●	Mugunghwa-ho, Saemaeul-ho, and ITX-Saemaeul services		1.8	47.5	Seoul	Yongsan-gu
K111	Ichon	이촌	二村	Makes all stops	No service	●	Seoul Subway Line 4		1.9	49.4	Seoul	Yongsan-gu
K112	Seobinggo	서빙고	西氷庫	Makes all stops	No service	｜			1.7	51.1	Seoul	Yongsan-gu
K113	Hannam	한남	漢南	Makes all stops	No service	｜			1.9	53.0	Seoul	Yongsan-gu
K114	Oksu	옥수	玉水	Makes all stops	No service	●	Seoul Subway Line 3		1.6	54.6	Seoul	Seongdong-gu
K115	Eungbong	응봉	鷹峰	Makes all stops	No service	｜			1.8	56.4	Seoul	Seongdong-gu
K116	Wangsimni	왕십리	往十里	Makes all stops	No service	●	Suin–Bundang Line		1.4	57.8	Seoul	Seongdong-gu
K117	Cheongnyangni	청량리	淸凉里	Makes all stops	No service	●	Gyeongchun (shared)	Mugunghwa-ho, ITX-Saemaeul and Nuriro services	2.4	60.2	Seoul	Dongdaemun-gu
K118	Hoegi	회기	回基	Makes all stops	No service	●	Gyeongchun (shared)	Seoul Subway Line 1	1.4	61.6	Seoul	Dongdaemun-gu
K119	Jungnang	중랑	中浪	Makes all stops	No service	｜	Gyeongchun (shared)		1.8	63.4	Seoul	Jungnang-gu
K120	Sangbong	상봉	上鳳	Makes all stops	No service	●	Gyeongchun (shared)	(limited service)	0.8	64.2	Seoul	Jungnang-gu
K121	Mangu	망우	忘憂	Makes all stops	No service	｜	Gyeongchun Line		0.6	64.8	Seoul	Jungnang-gu
K122	Yangwon	양원	養源	Makes all stops	No service	｜			1.7	66.5	Seoul	Jungnang-gu
K123	Guri	구리	九里	Makes all stops	No service	●	Seoul Subway Line 8		3.2	69.7	Gyeonggi Province	Guri-si
K124	Donong	도농	陶農	Makes all stops	No service	●			1.7	71.4	Gyeonggi Province	Namyangju-si
K125	Yangjeong	양정	養正	Makes all stops	No service	｜			3.7	75.1	Gyeonggi Province	Namyangju-si
K126	Deokso	덕소	德沼	Makes all stops	No service	●	Mugunghwa-ho services (limited service) (limited service)		2.3	77.4	Gyeonggi Province	Namyangju-si
K127	Dosim	도심	陶深	Makes all stops	No service	●			1.5	78.9	Gyeonggi Province	Namyangju-si
K128	Paldang	팔당	八堂	Makes all stops	No service	▲			4.2	83.1	Gyeonggi Province	Namyangju-si
K129	Ungilsan	운길산	雲吉山	Makes all stops	No service	｜			6.4	89.5	Gyeonggi Province	Namyangju-si
K130	Yangsu	양수	兩水	Makes all stops	No service	●			1.9	91.4	Gyeonggi Province	Yangpyeong-gun
K131	Sinwon	신원	新院	Makes all stops	No service	｜			4.7	96.1	Gyeonggi Province	Yangpyeong-gun
K132	Guksu	국수	菊秀	Makes all stops	No service	｜			2.9	99.0	Gyeonggi Province	Yangpyeong-gun
K133	Asin	아신	我新	Makes all stops	No service	｜			4.1	103.1	Gyeonggi Province	Yangpyeong-gun
K134	Obin	오빈	梧濱	Makes all stops	No service	｜			2.8	105.9	Gyeonggi Province	Yangpyeong-gun
K135	Yangpyeong	양평	楊平	Makes all stops	No service	●	Mugunghwa-ho services (limited service)		2.5	108.1	Gyeonggi Province	Yangpyeong-gun
K136	Wondeok	원덕	元德	Makes all stops	No service	｜			6.1	113.9	Gyeonggi Province	Yangpyeong-gun
K137	Yongmun	용문	龍門	Makes all stops	No service	●	Mugunghwa-ho services (limited service)		5.6	118.7	Gyeonggi Province	Yangpyeong-gun
K138	Jipyeong	지평	砥平	No service	No service	No service	Mugunghwa-ho services (limited service)		3.6	122.3	Gyeonggi Province	Yangpyeong-gun

=== Munsan-Imjingang Shuttle Service ===
Station Number	Station Name English	Station Name Hangul	Station Name Hanja	Transfer	Distance in km	Total Distance	Location	
K337	Imjingang	임진강	臨津江		3.7	-6.0	Gyeonggi Province	Paju
K336	Uncheon	운천	雲泉		2.3	-3.7	Gyeonggi Province	Paju
K335	Munsan	문산	文山	(main line)	3.7	0.0	Gyeonggi Province	Paju

=== Seoul Station branch ===
Station Number	Station	Hangul	Hanja	GS	Transfer
K315	Gajwa	가좌	加佐	Makes all stops	(main line)
P314	Sinchon	신촌	新村	Makes all stops	
P313	Seoul Station	서울역	---	Makes all stops	Mugunghwa-ho and ITX-Saemaeul services

== Rolling stock ==
Korail Class 321000 (21 trains)
Korail Class 331000 (27 trains)
