= Uncheon station =

Station of the Seoul Metropolitan Subway

운천; Uncheon
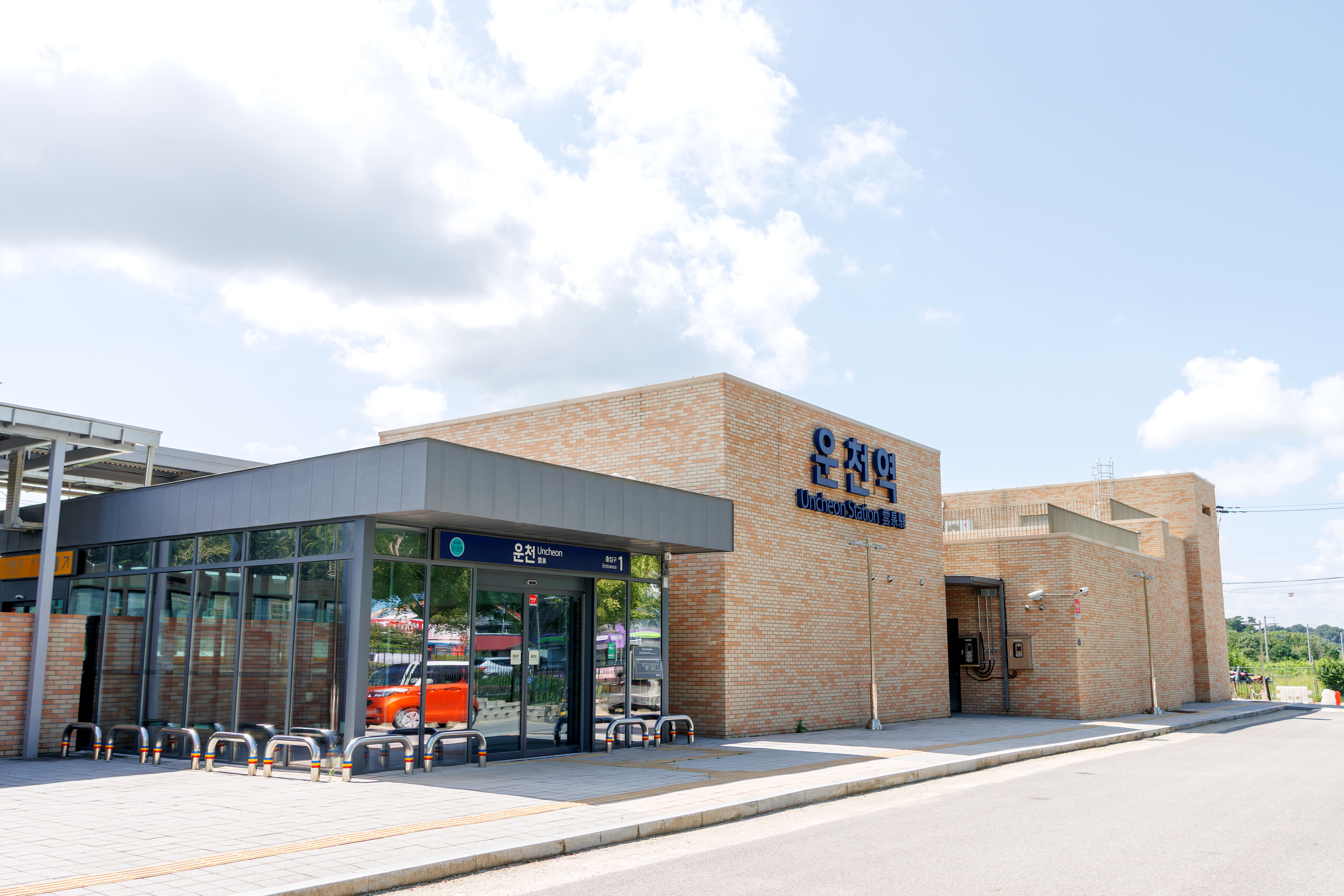
- New station in August 2026

Korean name
- Hangul: 운천역
- Hanja: 雲泉驛
- Revised Romanization: Uncheonnyeok
- McCune–Reischauer: Unch'ŏnnyŏk

General information
- Location: Uncheon-ri, Munsan-eup, Paju, Gyeonggi Province; South Korea
- Coordinates: 37°52′45.92″N 126°46′13.64″E
- Operator: Korail
- Line: Gyeongui–Jungang Line
- Platforms: 1 (1 side platform)
- Tracks: 1

Construction
- Structure type: Aboveground

History
- Opened: October 31, 2004
- Closed: October 2, 2019 (Temporary)
- Rebuilt: December 17, 2022

Key dates
- December 17, 2022: Gyeongui–Jungang Line Shuttle Service (Munsan - Imjingang) started

Services
Preceding station	Seoul Metropolitan Subway	Following station
Imjingang Terminus	Gyeongui–Jungang Line Munsan–Imjingang Shuttle Service	Munsan Terminus
Location

Uncheon station is a railway station on the Gyeongui–Jungang Line in South Korea. It is currently served by the Gyeongui–Jungang Line Munsan-Imjingang shuttle service.

The station lacks ticket vending machines. The station was planned to be abandoned entirely; however community pressure caused Korail to change its decision. The station was temporarily closed on October 2, 2019, when the Gyeongui–Jungang Line was extended to Imjingang station as a shuttle service from Munsan, and has been relocated and reopened at the relocated location on December 17, 2022.

== Station History ==
- October 31, 2004: Temporary platform opened for operation
- May 1, 2014: Commuter train service discontinued
- May 4, 2014: Peace train service started
- October 2, 2019: Peace train service discontinued
- December 17, 2022: New station opened

== Station layout ==
↑ Imjingang
| 1
↓ Munsan

Northbound	← ● Gyeongui–Jungang Line toward Imjingang
Southbound	→ ● Gyeongui–Jungang Line toward Munsan
