= Munsan station =

Metro station in Paju, South Korea

문산; Munsan
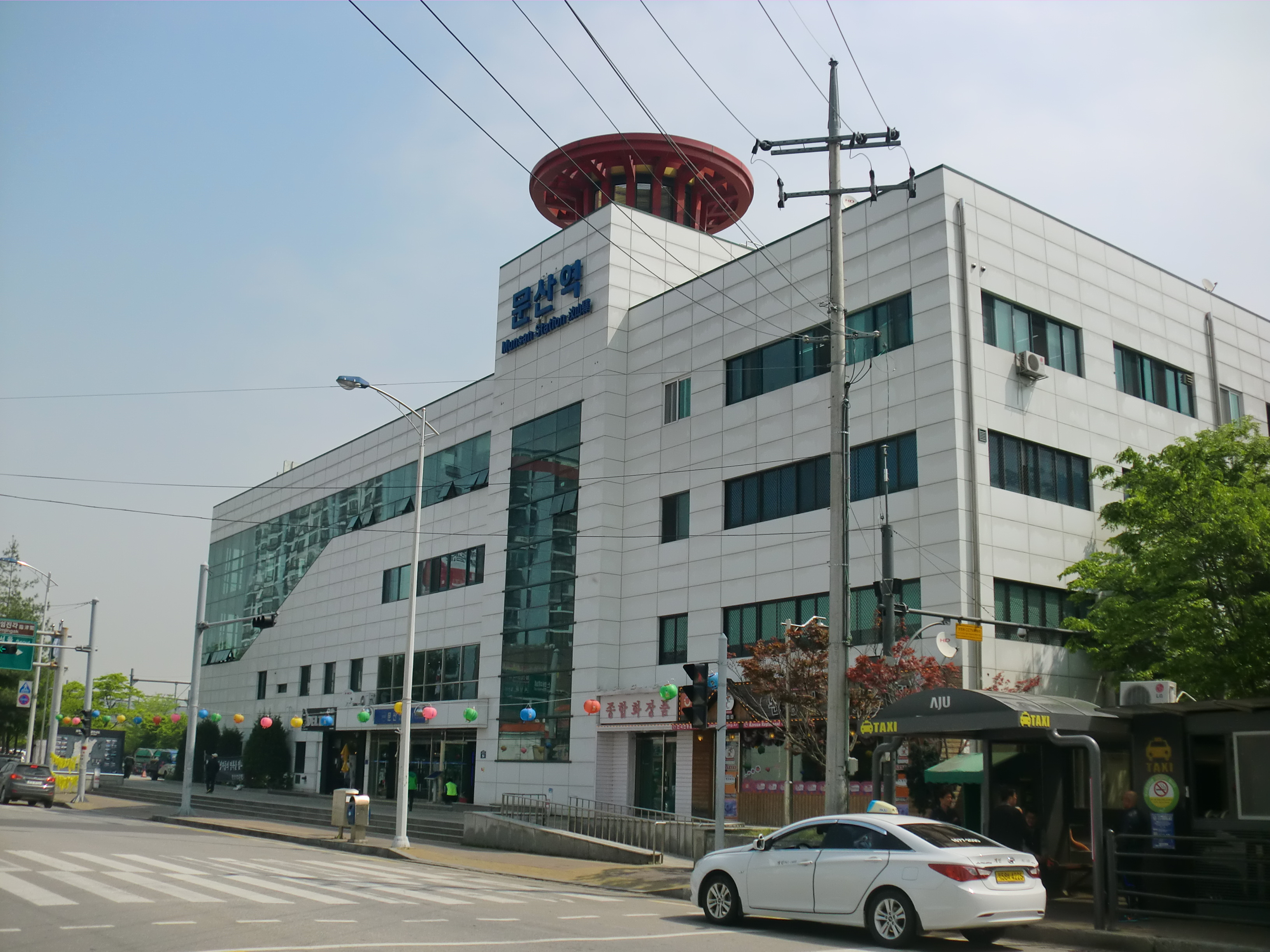

Korean name
- Hangul: 문산역
- Hanja: 汶山驛
- Revised Romanization: Munsannyeok
- McCune–Reischauer: Munsannyŏk

General information
- Location: 17-550 Munsan-ri; Munsan-eup, Paju-si; Gyeonggi-do
- Coordinates: 37°51′16″N 126°47′17″E
- Operator: Korail
- Line: Gyeongui–Jungang Line
- Platforms: 3
- Tracks: 6
- Bus routes: 9710 9710-1 7700; 11 11-1-1 11-2 22 22-1 22-2 92 92-1 93 93-1 93-2 93-3 93-4 93-5 93-6 93-7 93-8 93-9 93-10 93-11 93-12 93-13 93-14 95 021 051A 051A(행복) 051B 051B(행복) 053 053-1 054-1 054-2 054-3 054-4 054-5 054-6 054-7 054-8 058A 058A(임진각) 058B 058B(임진각)

Construction
- Structure type: Aboveground

History
- Opened: April 4, 1906

Key dates
- July 1, 2009: Gyeongui–Jungang Line (Seoul - Munsan) started service
- March 28, 2020: Gyeongui–Jungang Line Shuttle Service (Munsan - Imjingang) started
Services
Preceding station	Seoul Metropolitan Subway	Following station
Terminus	Gyeongui–Jungang Line	Paju towards Jipyeong or Seoul Station
Terminus	Gyeongui–Jungang Line Gyeongui Express	Geumchon towards Yongmun
Terminus	Gyeongui–Jungang Line Jungang Express	Paju towards Yongmun
Terminus	Gyeongui–Jungang Line Gyeongui Express	Geumchon towards Seoul Station
Uncheon towards Imjingang	Gyeongui–Jungang Line Munsan–Imjingang Shuttle Service	Terminus
Location

Munsan station (Korean: 문산역) is a railway station on the Gyeongui–Jungang Line.

== History ==
On March 18, 2007, a train from Munsan station entered North Korea for the first time since 1951 under South Korean Unification Minister Lee Jae-joung. Members of the opposition Grand National Party criticized the event as a political stunt.

== Services ==
As a regular railway station it is an interim stop between Dorasan station in the Demilitarised Zone and Seoul Station. The tourist train between Seoul and the DMZ Border is no longer in operation, due to concerns about the spread of the outbreak of African swine fever.

The Gyeongui–Jungang Line (Munsan–Imjingang) extension opened on March 28, 2020.

== Station layout ==
L2; Platforms	Platform 6	DMZ Peace Link Train does not stop here →
L2; Platforms	Island platform, doors will open on the left, right
L2; Platforms	Platform 5	← DMZ Peace Link Train does not stop here
L2; Platforms	Platform 4	Gyeongui–Jungang Line Alighting Passengers Only → Gyeongui–Jungang Line toward Imjingang (Uncheon) →
L2; Platforms	Island platform, doors will open on the left, right
L2; Platforms	Platform 3	Gyeongui–Jungang Line Alighting Passengers Only → Gyeongui–Jungang Line toward Imjingang (Uncheon) →
L2; Platforms	Platform 2	← Gyeongui–Jungang Line toward Jipyeong (Paju)
L2; Platforms	Island platform, doors will open on the left, right
L2; Platforms	Platform 1	← Gyeongui–Jungang Line toward Jipyeong (Paju)

L1; Concourse	Lobby	Customer Service, Shops, Vending machines, ATMs

G	Street level	Exit
