= Yongmun station (Yangpyeong) =

Station of the Seoul Metropolitan Subway

용문
Yongmun
용문; Yongmun
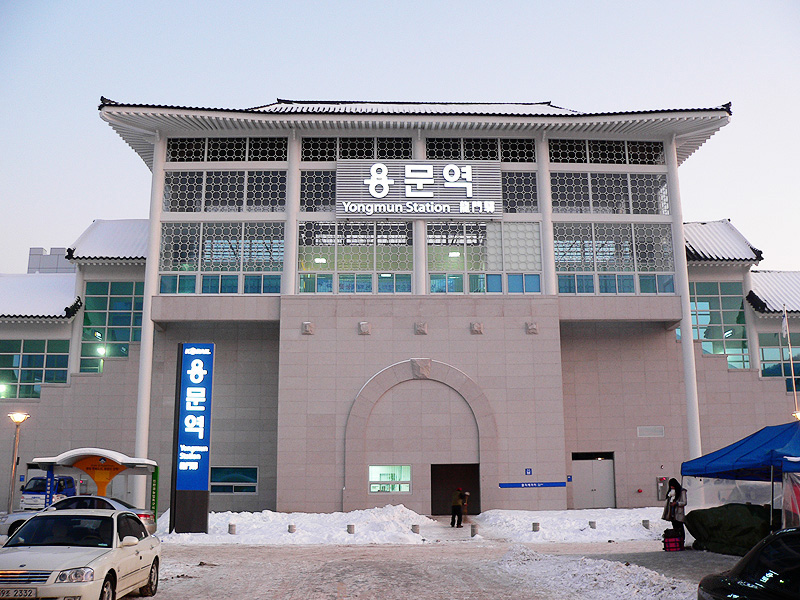

Korean name
- Hangul: 용문역
- Hanja: 龍門驛
- Revised Romanization: Yongmunnyeok
- McCune–Reischauer: Yongmunnyŏk

General information
- Location: 737 Damunni, 18 Yongmun- yeokgil, Yongmun-myeon, Yangpyeong-gun, Gyeonggi-do
- Coordinates: 37°28′56″N 127°35′42″E
- Operator: Korail
- Line: Gyeongui–Jungang Line
- Platforms: 4
- Tracks: 6

Construction
- Structure type: Aboveground

History
- Opened: April 1, 1941

Key dates
- December 23, 2009: Gyeongui–Jungang Line opened
Location

Yongmun station is a station on the Gyeongui–Jungang Line in Gyeonggi-do, South Korea. It was the eastern terminus of the commuter railway, running from Seoul to Yangpyeong County until 2017. Mugunghwa trains also stop at this station.

Nearby attractions include Mt. Yongmun (1,157 m), a popular place for mountain hikers, and Yongmunsa, a Buddhist temple.

Preceding station	Seoul Metropolitan Subway	Following station
Wondeok towards Munsan	Gyeongui–Jungang Line	Jipyeong Terminus
Wondeok towards Munsan	Gyeongui–Jungang Line Gyeongui Express	Terminus
Yangpyeong towards Munsan	Gyeongui–Jungang Line Jungang Express	Terminus
Preceding station	Korail	Following station
Yangpyeong towards Cheongnyangni	ITX-Maum Jungang Line	Yangdong towards Andong or Bujeon
Yangpyeong towards Cheongnyangni	Mugunghwa-ho Taebaek Line	Jipyeong towards Donghae
