= Jipyeong station =

Railway station in Gyeonggi-do, South Korea

지평
Jipyeong
지평; Jipyeong
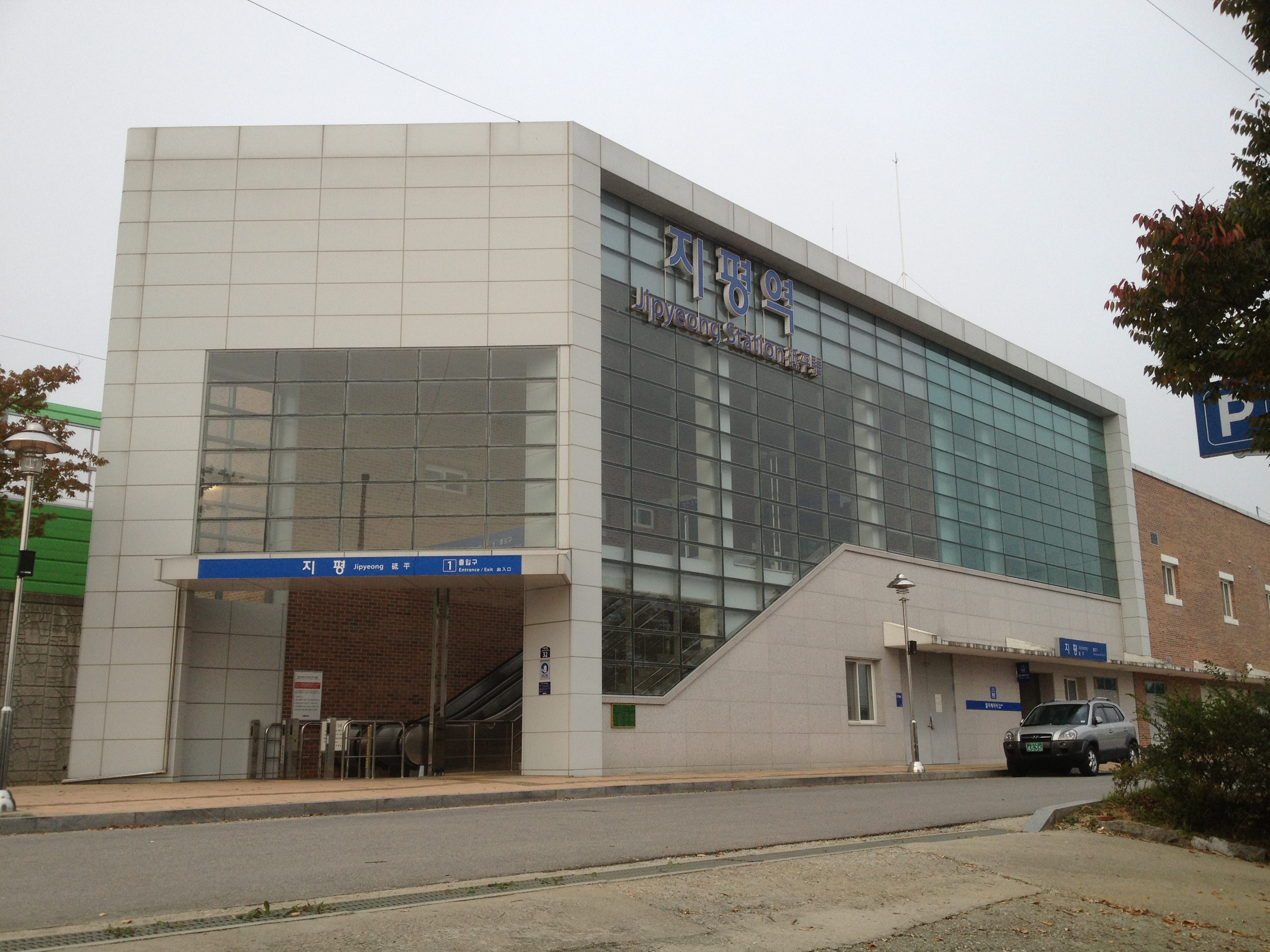

Korean name
- Hangul: 지평역
- Hanja: 砥平驛
- RR: Jipyeong-yeok
- MR: Chip'yŏng-yŏk

General information
- Location: Jipyeongyeok gil 32 Jipyeong-myeon, Yangpyeong-gun, Gyeonggi-do
- Coordinates: 37°28′35″N 127°37′47″E
- Operator: Korail
- Line: Gyeongui–Jungang Line
- Platforms: 2
- Tracks: 7

Construction
- Structure type: Aboveground

History
- Opened: April 1, 1940

Key dates
- January 21, 2017: Gyeongui–Jungang Line extended

Services
Preceding station	Seoul Metropolitan Subway	Following station
Yongmun towards Munsan	Gyeongui–Jungang Line	Terminus
Preceding station	Korail	Following station
Yongmun towards Cheongnyangni	Mugunghwa-ho Taebaek Line	Seokbul towards Donghae
Location

Jipyeong station (Korean: 지평역) is a station on the Gyeongui–Jungang Line in Gyeonggi-do, South Korea. It is the eastern terminus of the commuter railway, running from Seoul to Yangpyeong County. Mugunghwa-ho trains also stop at this station. It was originally built in 1940 and serves the Gyeongui–Jungang Line of the Seoul Metropolitan Subway since 2017.
