= Yongsan Line =

Railway line in South Korea

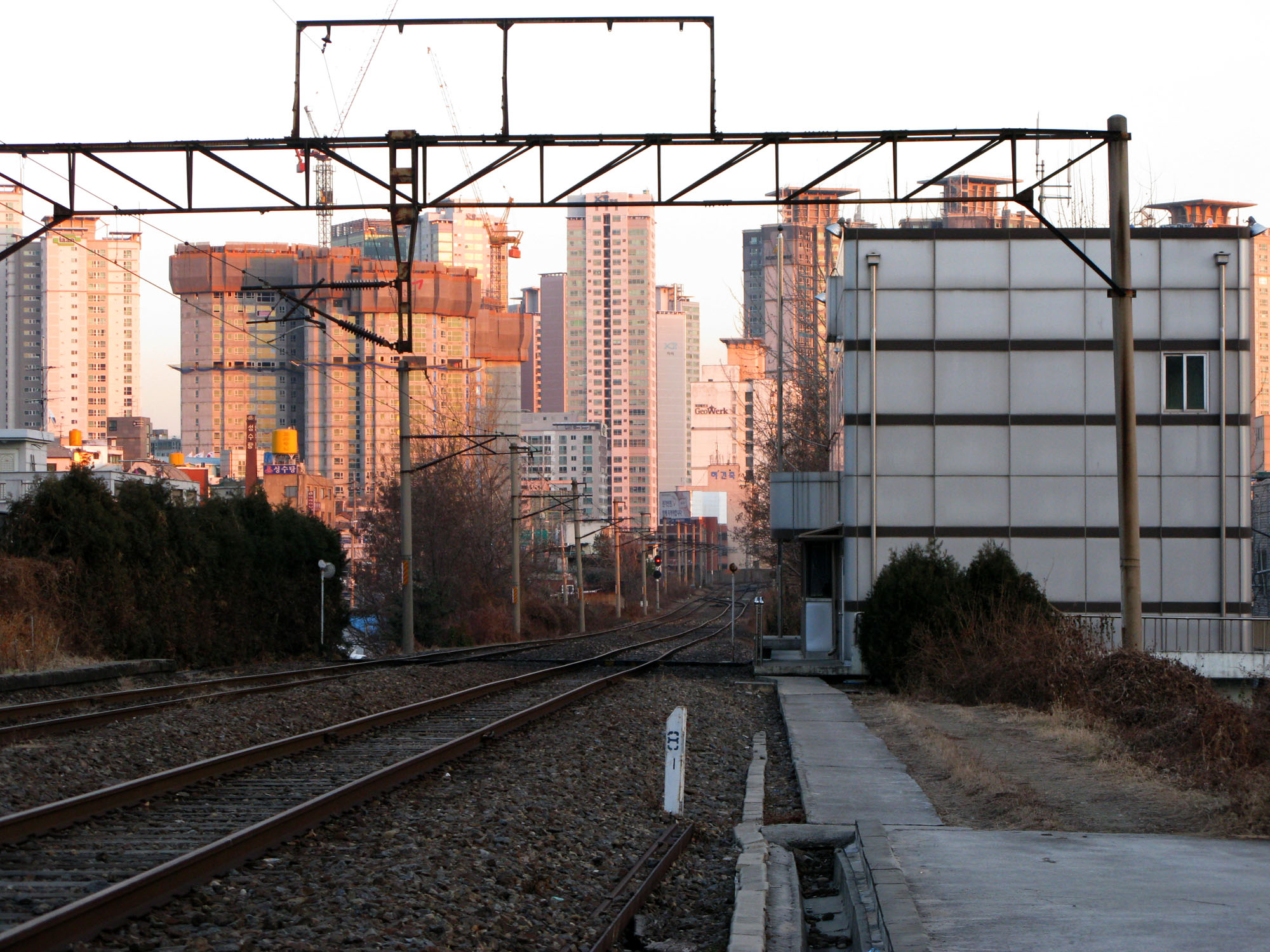
Yongsan Line

The Yongsan Line (Korean: 용산선; Hanja: 龍山線) is a branch railroad of the Gyeongui Line, currently in service on the Gyeongui-Jungang Line. It connects Yongsan Station to Gajwa Station on the Gyeongui Line. The line was abandoned in 2005, but was reopened as an underground subway line in 2012 from Gajwa Station to Gongdeok Station and in 2014 from Gongdeok Station to Yongsan Station.

== Stations ==
Gyeongui Metro stations
Station Number	Station name			Transfer	Station distance	Total distance	Location	
Station Number	Romanized	Hangul	Hanja	Transfer	in km		Location	
K110	Yongsan	용산	龍山	Honam KTX	0.0	0.0	Seoul	Yongsan-gu
K311	Hyochang Park	효창공원앞역	孝昌公園앞驛	Seoul Subway Line 6	1.8	1.8	Seoul	Yongsan-gu
K312	Gongdeok	공덕	孔德	Seoul Subway Line 5 Seoul Subway Line 6 AREX	0.7	2.5	Seoul	Mapo-gu
K313	Sogang Univ.	서강대	西江大		1.9	4.4	Seoul	Mapo-gu
K314	Hongik Univ.	홍대입구	弘大入口	Seoul Subway Line 2 AREX	0.9	5.3	Seoul	Mapo-gu
K315	Gajwa	가좌	加佐		1.7	7.0	Seoul	Seodaemun-gu
