= Sinchon station (Gyeongui Line) =

Train station on Gyeongui Line in Seodaemun-gu, Seoul, South Korea

| 신촌; Sinchon |
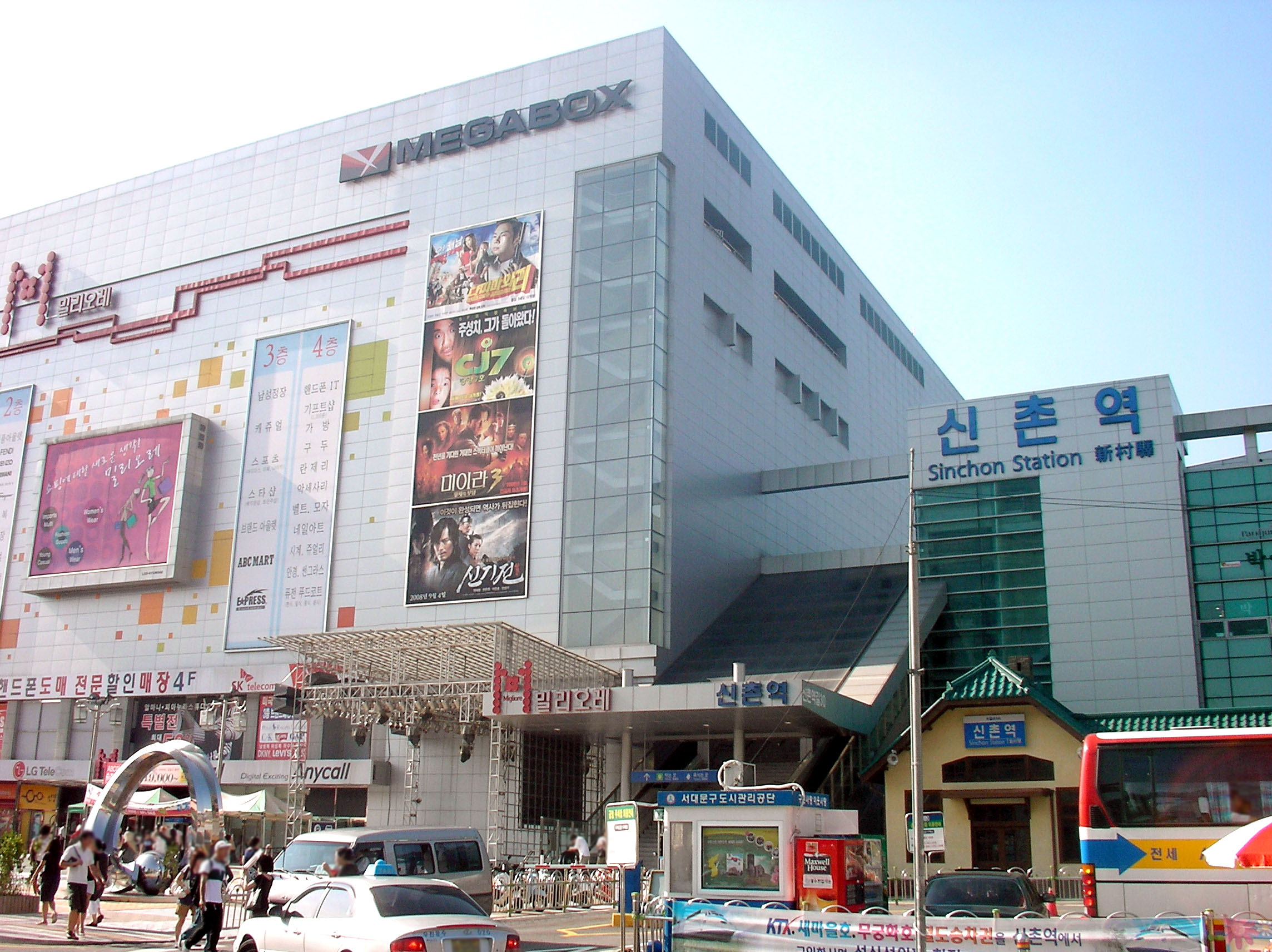

Korean name
- Hangul: 신촌역
- Hanja: 新村驛
- Revised Romanization: Sinchonnyeok
- McCune–Reischauer: Sinch'onnyŏk

General information
- Location: 30, Sincheonyeok-ro, 74-12 Sinchon-dong, Seodaemun-gu, Seoul
- Coordinates: 37°33′35″N 126°56′35″E
- Operator: Korail
- Line: Gyeongui–Jungang Line
- Platforms: 1 island platform
- Tracks: 2

Construction
- Structure type: Aboveground

Key dates
- July 1, 2009: Gyeongui–Jungang Line opened
Location

Sinchon station is a station on the Gyeongui–Jungang Line. It was opened as a railway station in 1921 and Seoul Metro traffic commenced in 2009.

== Vicinity ==
- Exit 2 : access to the Hyundai Department Store U-plex Sinchon.

It is close to Sogang University station, and there are about 6 Starbucks coffee shops near Sinchon station.

| Preceding station | Seoul Metropolitan Subway | Following station |
|---|---|---|
| Gajwa towards Munsan | Gyeongui–Jungang Line | Seoul Station Terminus |
| Gajwa towards Munsan | Gyeongui–Jungang Line Gyeongui Express | Seoul Station Terminus |
