= Jeungsan station (Seoul) =

Train station in South Korea

증산 (명지대앞); Jeungsan (Myongji Univ.)
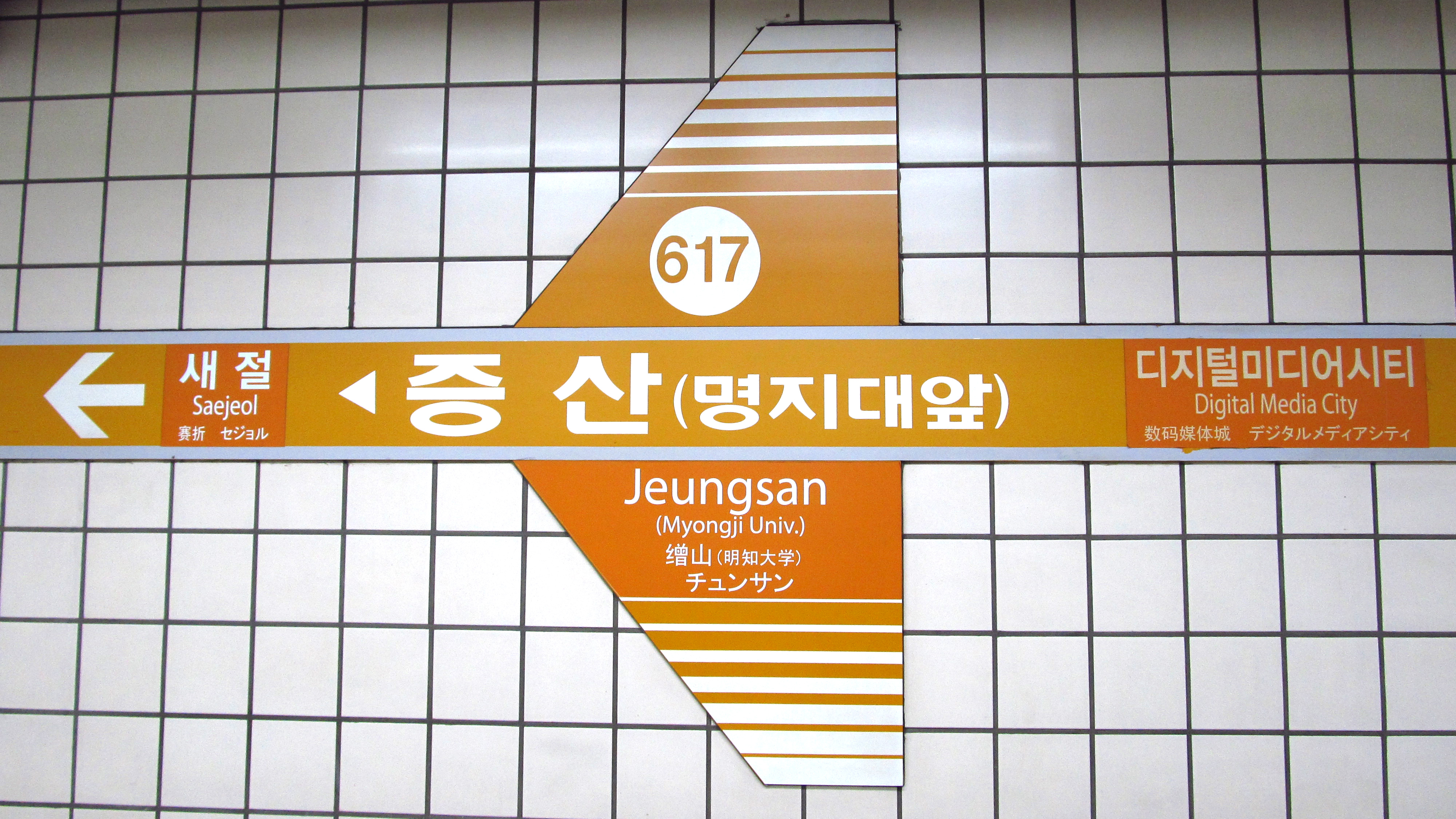

Korean name
- Hangul: 증산역
- Hanja: 繒山驛
- Revised Romanization: Jeungsannyeok
- McCune–Reischauer: Chŭngsannyŏk

General information
- Location: 306 Jeungsan-ro Jiha, 199-8 Jeungsan-dong, Eunpyeong-gu, Seoul
- Coordinates: 37°35′02″N 126°54′35″E
- Operated by: Seoul Metro
- Line(s): Line 6
- Platforms: 2
- Tracks: 2

Construction
- Structure type: Underground

History
- Opened: December 15, 2000

Services
Preceding station	Seoul Metropolitan Subway	Following station
Saejeol towards Eungam	Line 6	Digital Media City towards Sinnae

Jeungsan Station is a railway station on Line 6 of the Seoul Subway. Its alternative name is Myongji University Station due to the proximity to Myongji University.

== Station layout ==
G	Street level	Exit

L1; Concourse	Lobby	Customer Service, Shops, Vending machines, ATMs

L2; Platform level	Side platform, doors will open on the right
L2; Platform level	Westbound	← Line 6 toward Eungam (Saejeol)
L2; Platform level	Eastbound	Line 6 toward Sinnae (Digital Media City) →
L2; Platform level	Side platform, doors will open on the right

== Exits ==
- Exit 2: Bukgajwa Elementary School
- Exit 3: Jeungsan Elementary & Middle Schools
- Exit 4: Yeonseo Middle School
