= Digital Media City station =

Train station in South Korea

디지털미디어시티; Digital Media City
디지털미디어시티; Digital Media City
디지털미디어시티 (스카이라이프); Digital Media City (Skylife)
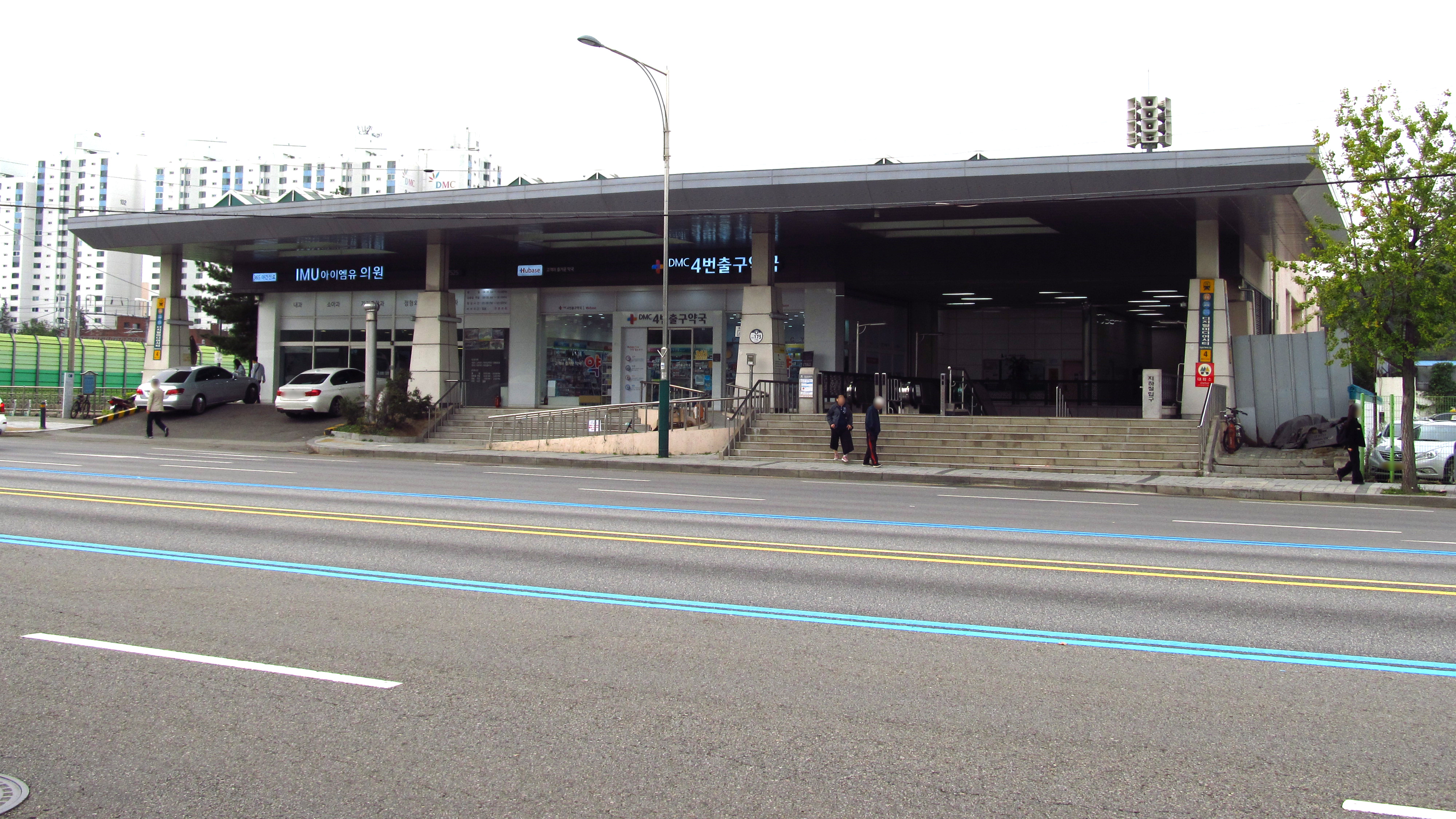
- Digital Media City Station Entrance No. 4

Korean name
- Hangul: 디지털미디어시티역
- Hanja: 디지털미디어시티驛
- Revised Romanization: Dijiteolmidieositi-yeok
- McCune–Reischauer: Tijit'ŏlmidiŏsit'i-yŏk

General information
- Location: 175 Susaek-ro Jiha, 223-27 Jeungsan-dong; 193 Susaek-ro, 37-7 Susaek-dong, Eunpyeong-gu, Seoul
- Coordinates: 37°34′36″N 126°54′05″E
- Operator: Seoul Metro; Airport Railroad Co., Ltd.; Korail
- Lines: Line 6; Gyeongui–Jungang Line; AREX
- Platforms: 7
- Tracks: 10

Other information
- Station code: 618 (Line 6); K316 (Gyeongui–Jungang Line); A04 (AREX)

History
- Former names: Susaek (Line 6); Multimedia City (AREX & Gyeongui–Jungang Line)

Key dates
- December 15, 2000: Line 6 opened
- July 1, 2009: Gyeongui–Jungang Line opened
- December 29, 2010: AREX opened
Services
Preceding station	Seoul Metropolitan Subway	Following station
Jeungsan towards Eungam	Line 6	World Cup Stadium towards Sinnae
Hongik University towards Seoul Station	AREX	Magongnaru towards Incheon International Airport Terminal 2
Susaek towards Munsan	Gyeongui–Jungang Line	Gajwa towards Jipyeong or Seoul Station
Haengsin towards Munsan	Gyeongui–Jungang Line Gyeongui Express	Gajwa towards Yongmun
Haengsin towards Munsan	Gyeongui–Jungang Line Gyeongui Express	Gajwa towards Seoul Station
Susaek towards Munsan	Gyeongui–Jungang Line Jungang Express	Gajwa towards Yongmun
Location

Digital Media City Station (Korean: 디지털미디어시티역) is a railway station on Seoul Subway Line 6, AREX and the Gyeongui–Jungang Line. The former names of this station were Multimedia City Station (멀티미디어시티역) for the AREX station and Susaek (수색) for the Line 6.

== Structure ==
The three stations meet in an overall D-shape, with a Seoul Metro station connecting the Korail and Airport Rail stations. There are nine exits.

There is a transfer corridor from the Gyeongui-Jungang Line platform to the Line 6 platform, and a transfer corridor from the Line 6 platform to the Airport Railroad platform. To transfer from Gyeongui-Jungang Line to Airport Railroad, you need to go through the Line 6 platform, so the transfer length is very long, so it is convenient to use Hongik University Entrance Area or Gongdeok Station, and it is suitable to use Digital Media City Station to transfer from Gyeongui-Jungang Line to Line 6 or Line 6 to Airport Railroad.

== Gallery ==
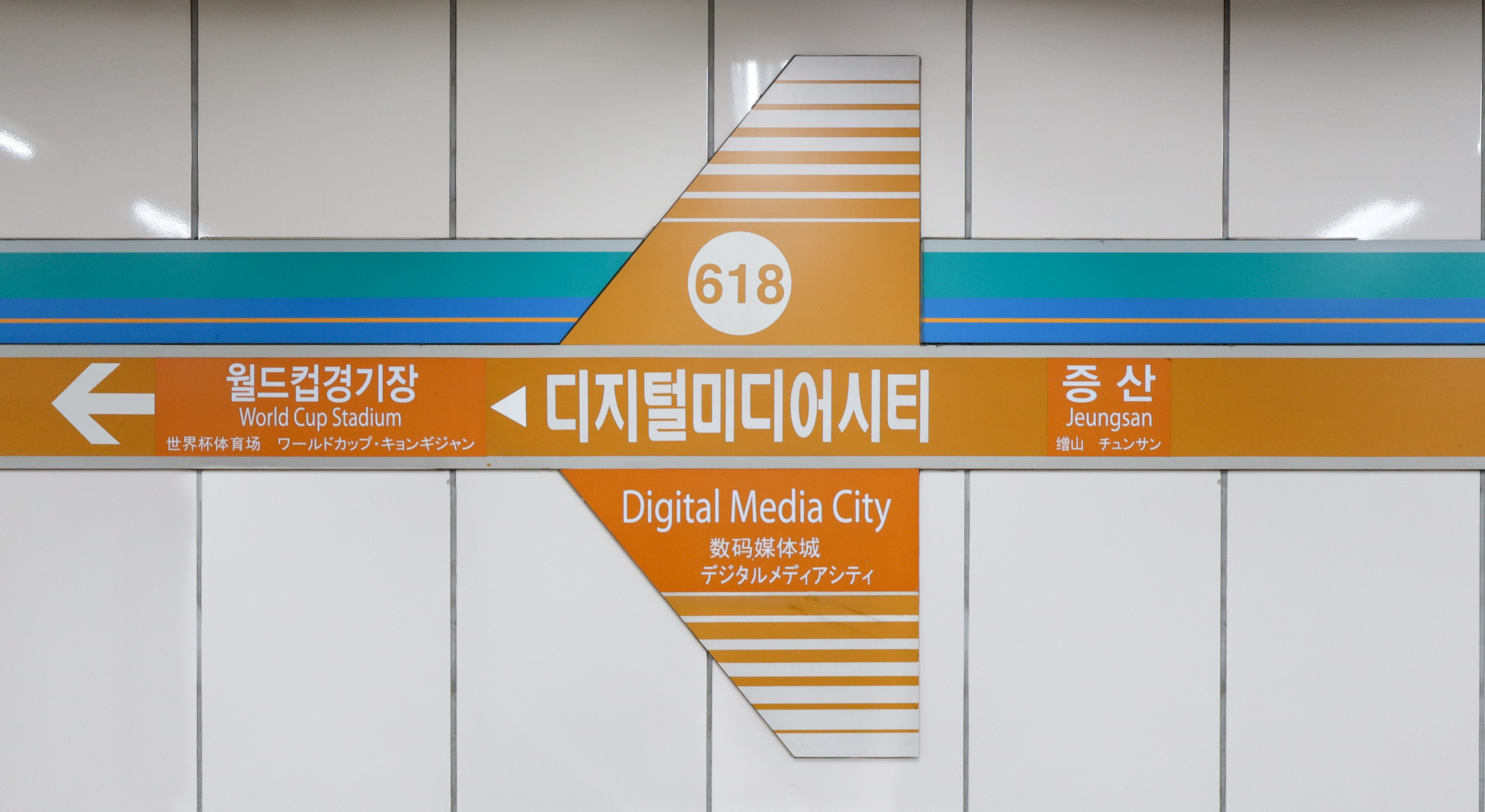
Station Sign (Line 6)

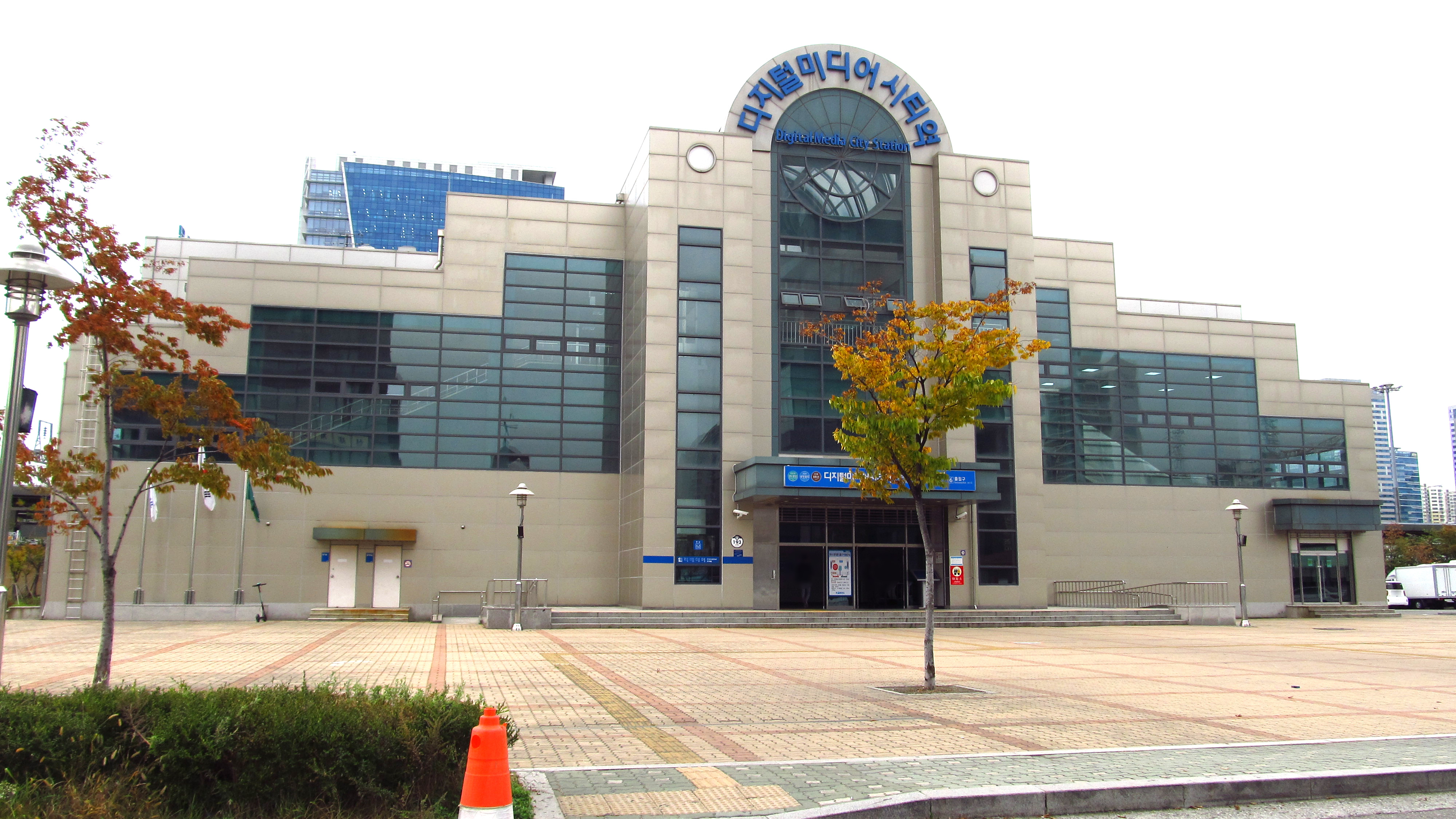
Digital Media City Korail station

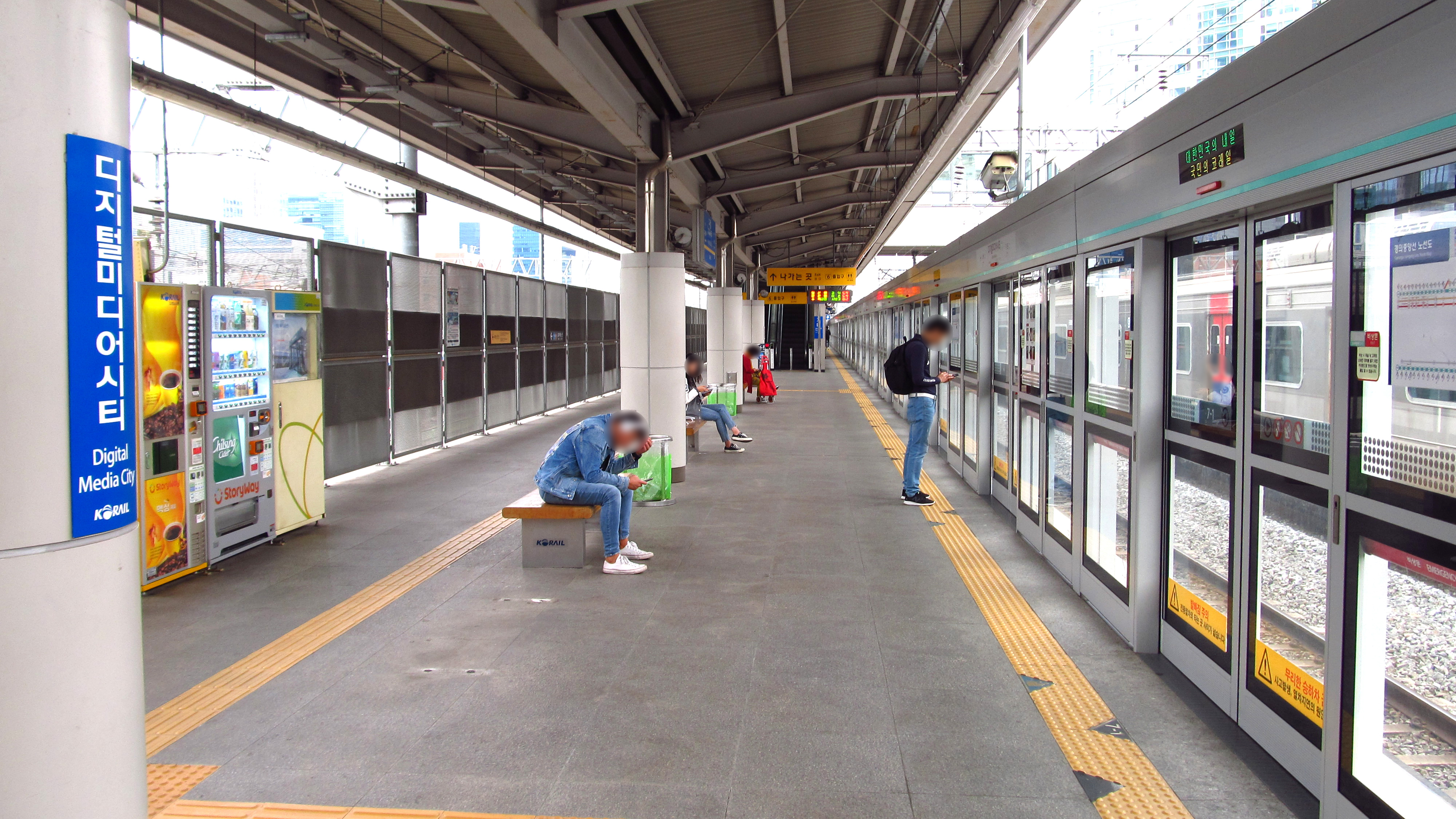
Gyeongui-Jungang Line platform

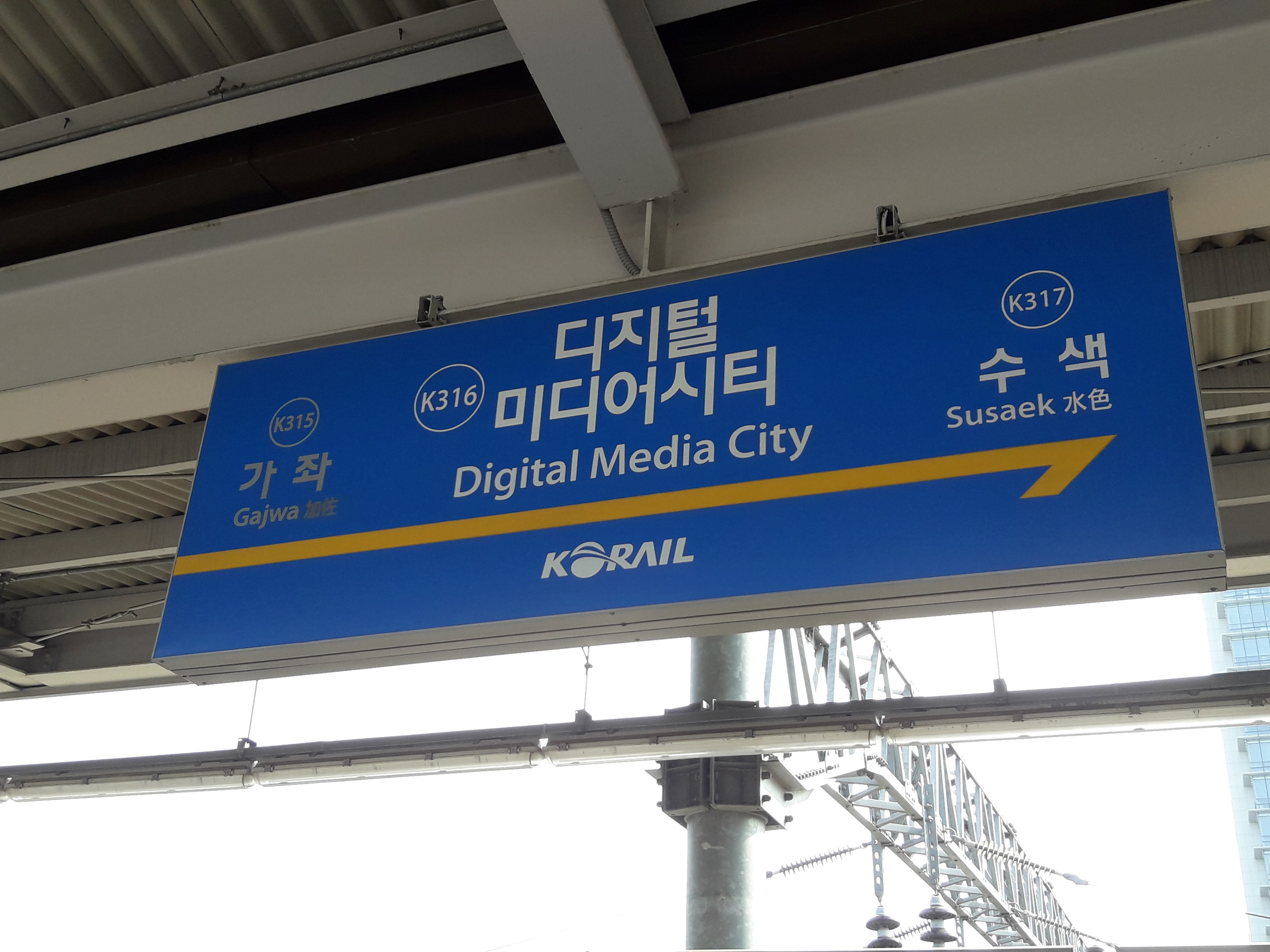
Station Sign (Gyeongui–Jungang Line)

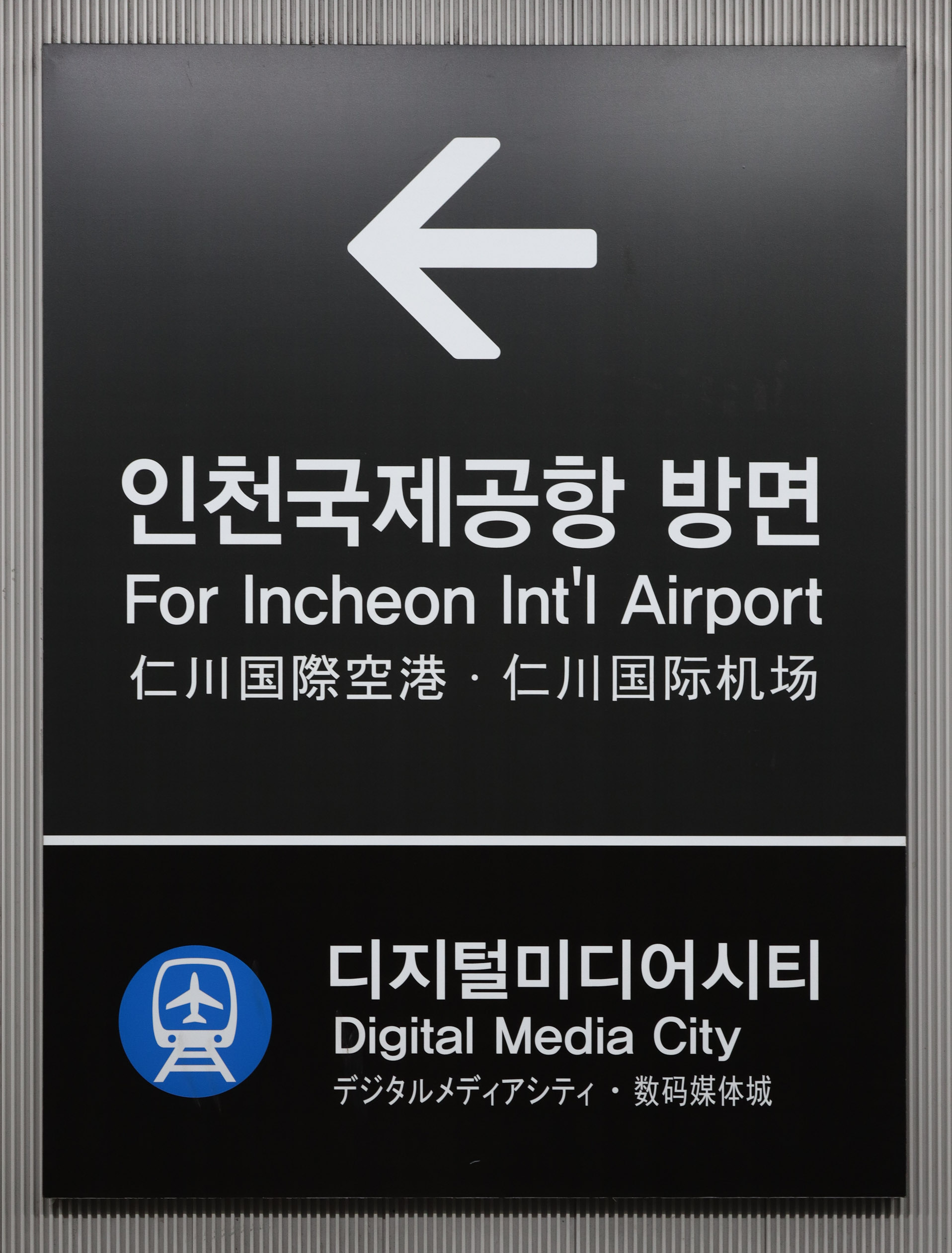
Station Sign (AREX)
