= Gajwa station =

Train station in Seoul, South Korea

가좌; Gajwa
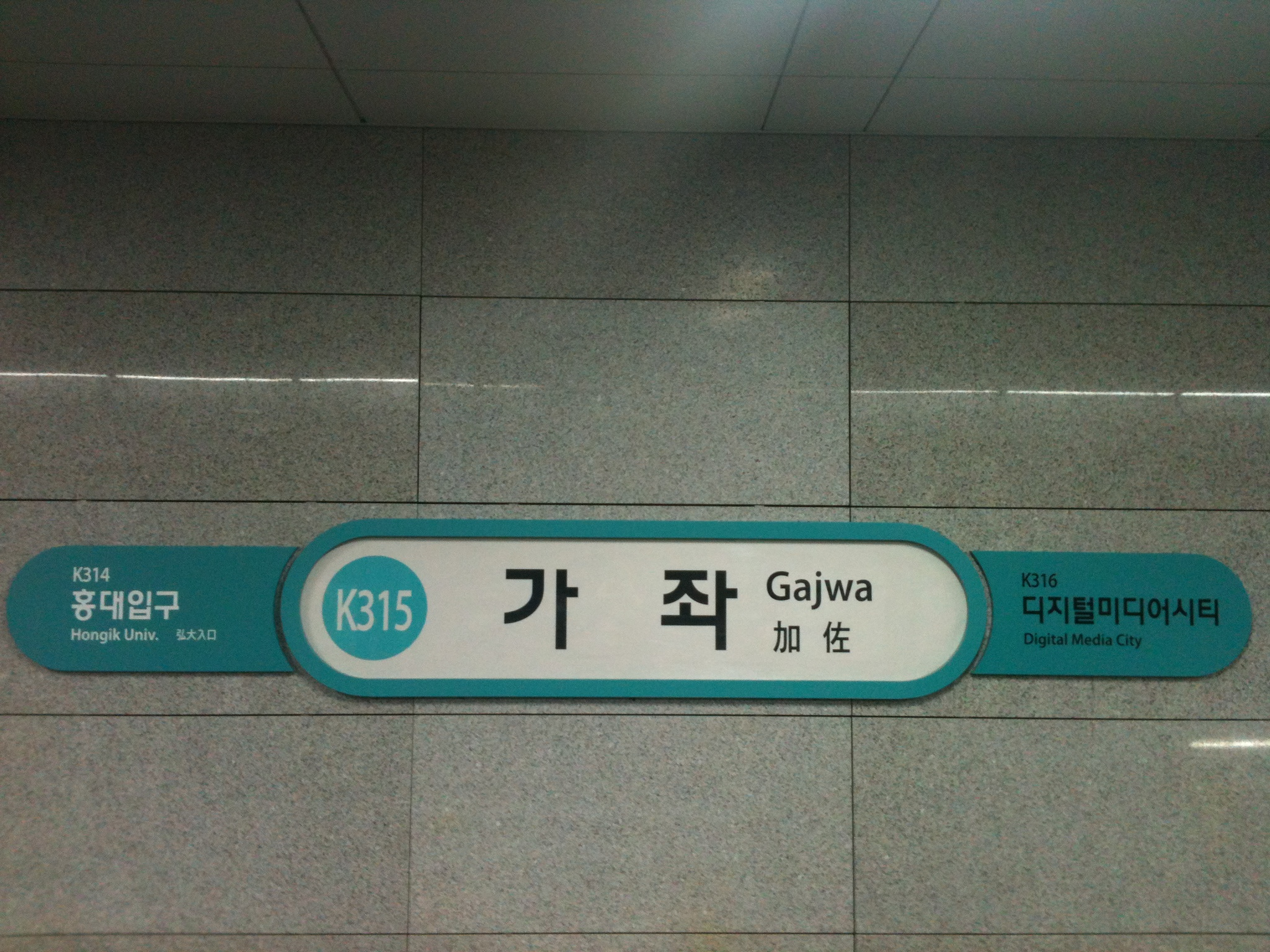
- Underground (to Jipyeong)

Korean name
- Hangul: 가좌역
- Hanja: 加佐驛
- Revised Romanization: Gajwa-yeok
- McCune–Reischauer: Kajwa-yŏk

General information
- Location: 293-64 Namgajwa-dong; Seodaemun-gu, Seoul
- Coordinates: 37°34′7.16″N 126°54′54.90″E
- Operator: Korail
- Line: Gyeongui–Jungang Line
- Platforms: 3 (1 island platform to Seoul Station, 2 side platforms to Jipyeong)
- Tracks: 4
- Bus routes: 6005

Construction
- Structure type: Aboveground / Underground

History
- Opened: December 1, 1930 (above-ground platforms)

Key dates
- July 1, 2009: Gyeongui–Jungang Line started service (above-ground platforms)
- December 15, 2012: Gyeongui–Jungang Line underground platforms opened
Location

Gajwa Station is a station on the Gyeongui–Jungang Line in Seoul, South Korea.

== History ==
The station is the last stop between Sinchon Station and Digital Media City Station on the Gyeongui Line and Yongsan Line, followed by Sogang University Station on the Yongsan Line. Gajwa Station opened on 1 December 1930 and Gyeongui Line opened on 1 July 2009.

In September 2019, an idle space on the first basement floor of Gajwa Station was created as an office space for social and economic enterprises and start-ups. The site has been named Gajwa Station Social Venture Hub Center.

== Nearby Facilities ==
Near the station, there are Namgajwa 1-dong Community Center, Sandnae Market, and Hongjecheon Stream.

== Gallery ==
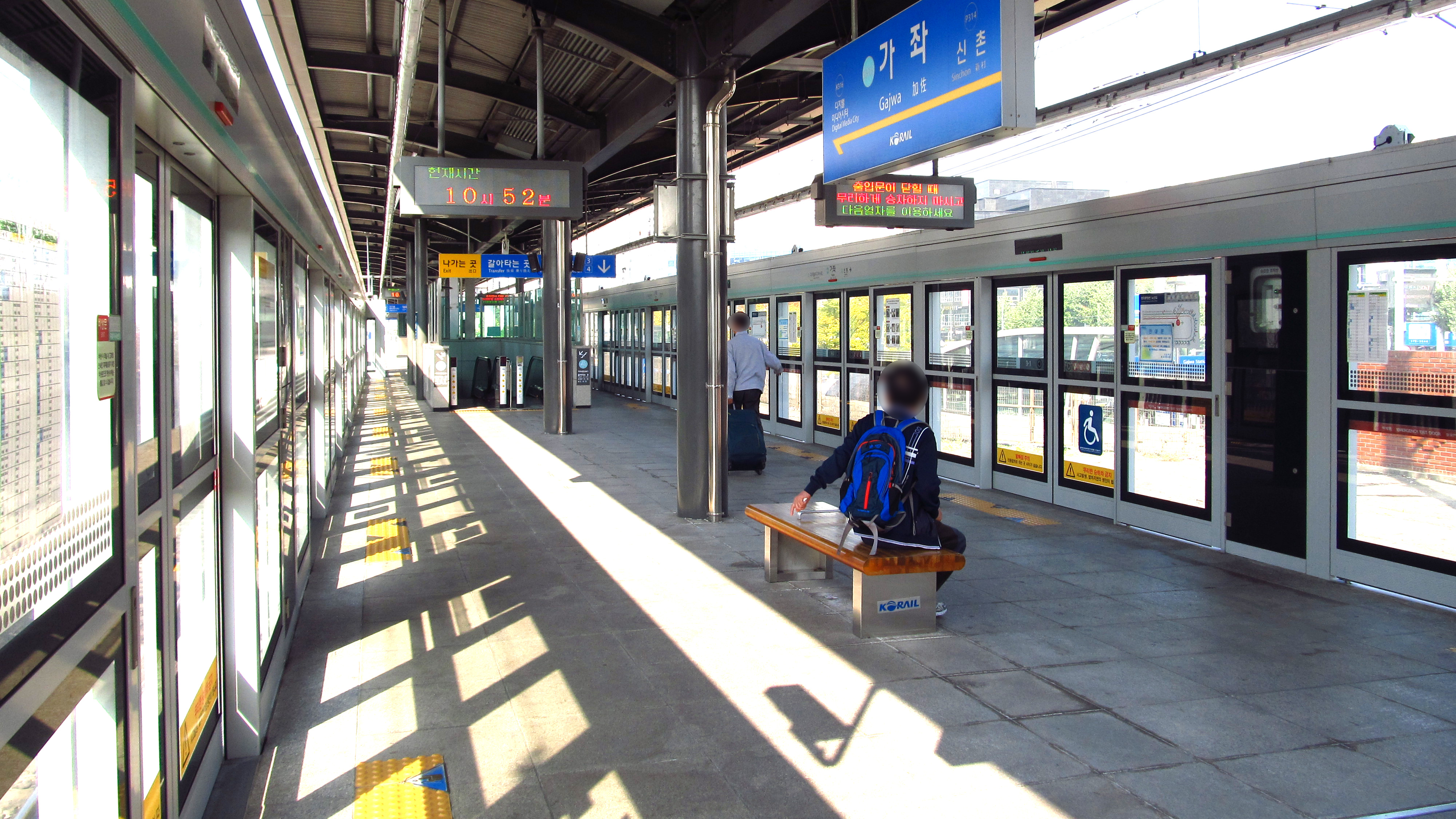
Above-ground platforms (for trains to/from Seoul)

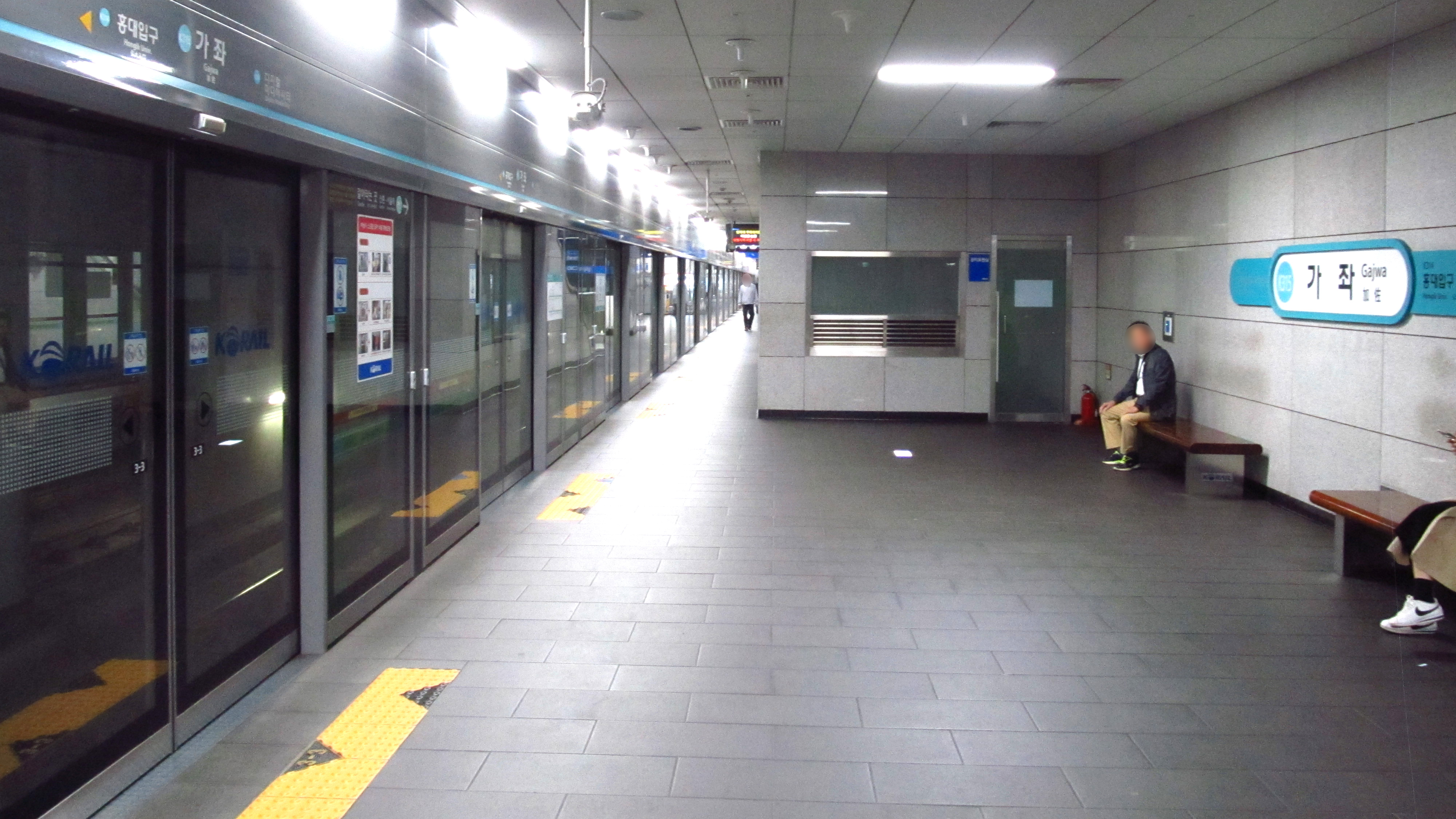
Underground platforms (for trains via Hongik Univ.)

Preceding station	Seoul Metropolitan Subway	Following station
Digital Media City towards Munsan	Gyeongui–Jungang Line	Hongik University towards Jipyeong
Digital Media City towards Munsan	Gyeongui–Jungang Line	Sinchon towards Seoul Station
Digital Media City towards Munsan	Gyeongui–Jungang Line Gyeongui Express	Hongik University towards Yongmun
Digital Media City towards Munsan	Gyeongui–Jungang Line Jungang Express	Hongik University towards Yongmun
Digital Media City towards Munsan	Gyeongui–Jungang Line Gyeongui Express	Sinchon towards Seoul Station
