= Gongdeok-dong =

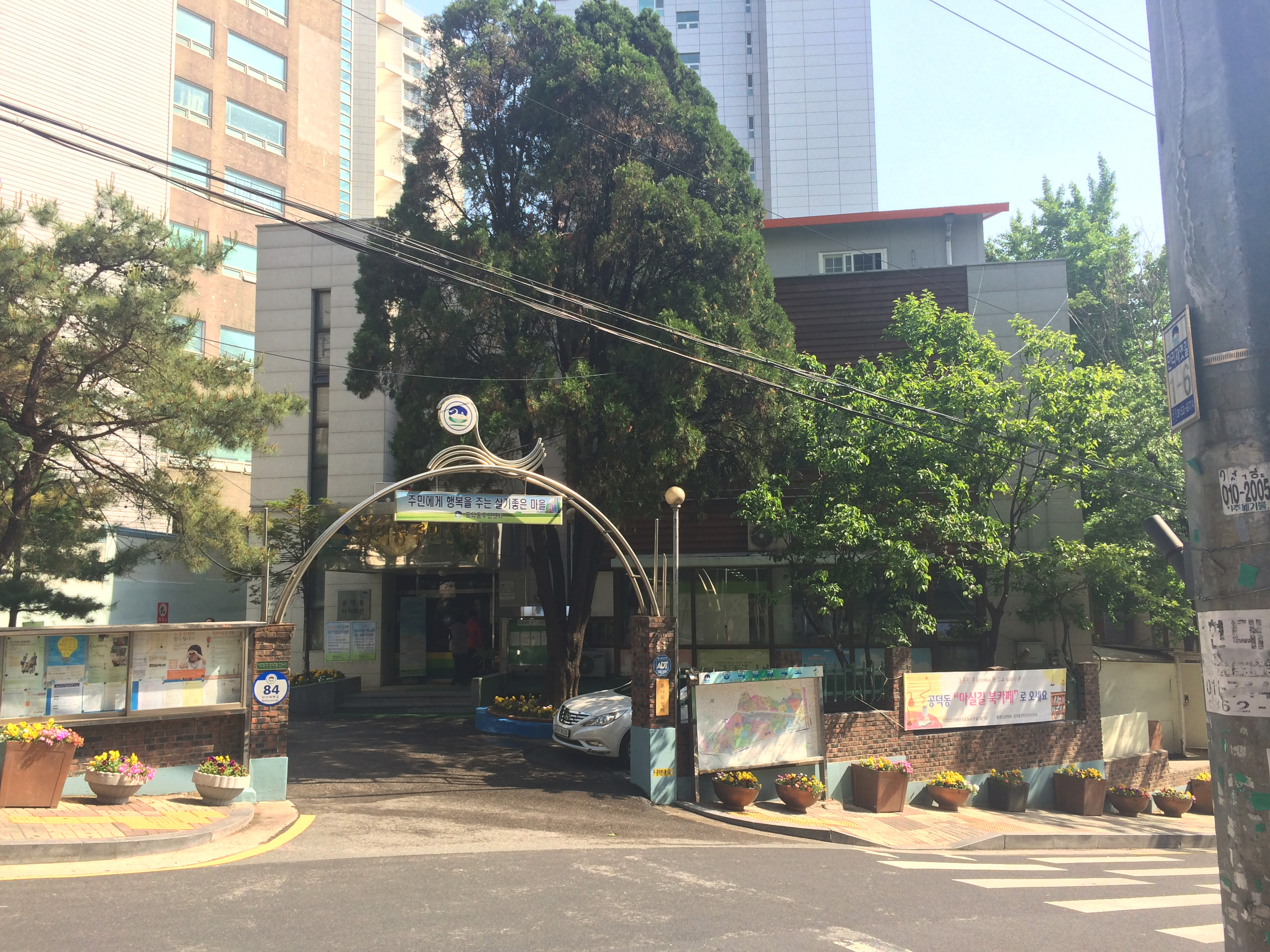
- Gongdeok-dong Community Service Center

- Location within Seoul Location within South Korea
- Country: South Korea

Area
  - Total: 0.73 km^{2} (0.28 sq mi)

Population (2001)
  - Total: 23,888
  - Density: 33,000/km^{2} (85,000/sq mi)

Korean name
- Hangul: 공덕동
- Hanja: 孔德洞
- RR: Gongdeok-dong
- MR: Kongdŏk-tong

Gongdeok-dong (Korean: 공덕동) is a legal dong (neighborhood) of Mapo District, Seoul, South Korea. Gongdeok-dong is governed by its administrative dong, the office of Cheonyeon-dong.

== Overview ==
The origin of the name Gongdeok is uncertain, but it seems to derive more from the Korean word "keun-deogi" (meaning "large hillock") than from the Chinese characters 孔德 (Gongdeok). In Korean, a slightly elevated flat area was called a deogi or deok, meaning a small hill or mound. The area around present-day Gongdeok-dong generally consists of hill roads extending southwest from the ridges of Mallihyeon, Ahyeon, and Daehyeon. It is believed that this area was originally referred to in Korean as keun-deogi or keun-deok, and over time, the name was transferred to the Chinese-character pronunciation Gongdeok.

Another theory suggests that the name Gongdeok-dong originated directly from the old place name Gongdeok-ri.

== Attractions ==
- Human Resources Development Service of Korea (한국산업인력공단 韓國産業人力公團)
- Asojeong (아소정 我笑亭)
- Gongdeok Market near Exit 4 of Gongdeok Station is on the Seoul list of Asia's 10 greatest street food cities for the haemul pajeon.

== See also ==
- Administrative divisions of South Korea
