= Daejang–Hongdae Line =

Subway line under construction in South Korea

Overview
- Native name: 대장-홍대선
- Status: Under construction
- Termini: Daejang; Hongik University
- Stations: 11

Service
- Type: Rapid transit
- System: Seoul Metropolitan Subway

History
- Planned opening: First half of 2031

Technical
- Line length: 20.029 km (12.445 mi)
- Number of tracks: 2
- Electrification: DC 1500V

- Daejang–Hongdae Line
- Hangul: 대장-홍대선
- Hanja: 大壯–弘大線
- RR: Daejang-hongdaeseon
- MR: Taejang-hongdaesŏn

Daejang–Hongdae Line (Korean: 대장-홍대선) is a subway line under construction in South Korea. It will connect Daejang-dong in Bucheon with Hongik University Station in Seoul. First formally proposed in 2014, it passed a financial feasibility study in 2021 and groundbreaking occurred in late 2025. It will be the first subway line in Korea to combine build-transfer-operate (BTO) and build-transfer-lease (BTL) investment models. The government will contribute 1 trillion KRW and Hyundai Engineering and Construction will contribute 1.1 trillion KRW and share revenue.

Several line extension proposals started to undergo evaluation in early 2026.
