= Saejeol station =

Train station in South Korea

새절 (신사); Saejeol (Sinsa)
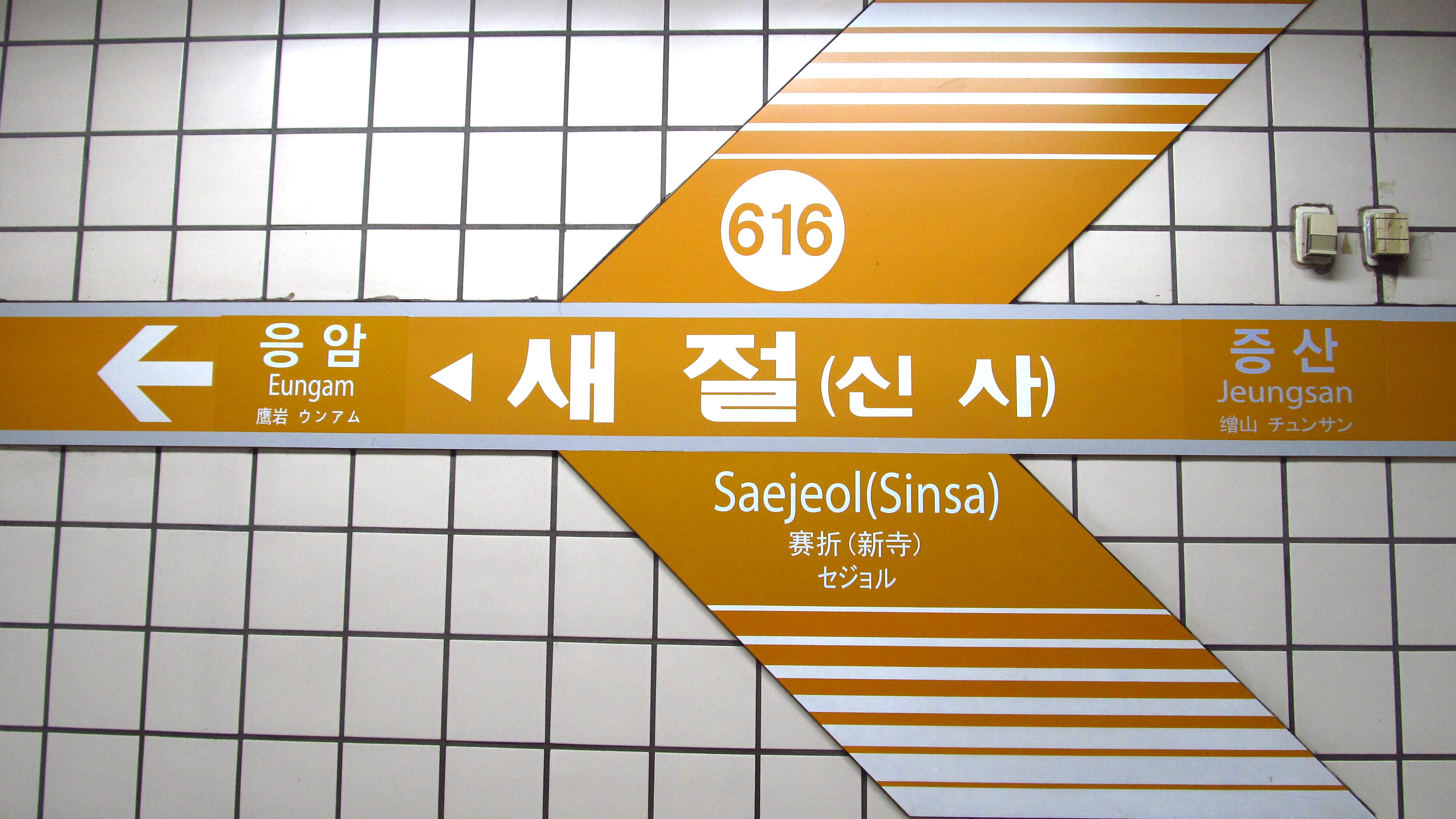

Korean name
- Hangul: 새절역
- Revised Romanization: Saejeollyeok
- McCune–Reischauer: Saejŏllyŏk

General information
- Location: 400 Jeungsan-o Jiha, 337-5 Sinsa-dong, Eunpyeong-gu, Seoul
- Coordinates: 37°35′28″N 126°54′49″E
- Operated by: Seoul Metro
- Line: Line 6
- Platforms: 2
- Tracks: 3

Construction
- Structure type: Underground

History
- Opened: December 15, 2000

Services
Preceding station	Seoul Metropolitan Subway	Following station
Eungam Terminus	Line 6	Jeungsan towards Sinnae
Location

Saejeol Station is a railway station on Line 6 of the Seoul Subway. It was originally planned to be called Sinsa Station, but the name was changed due to possible confusion with the pre-existing Sinsa station in Gangnam-gu, on Line 3.

== Station layout ==
Saejeol has an unusual layout with how its tracks and platforms are arranged. Trains going from Sinnae to Eungam pass between the platforms as expected for a station with two platforms, with doors opening on their right, but trains going from Eungam to Sinnae pass on the outside, akin to a station with island platforms, with doors opening on their left. A third track runs between the track leading to Eungam and the platform for Sinnae-bound trains, but remains unused.

Saejeol's unusual layout was due to plans to make it a passing loop to cut down travel times, also seen in Sangwolgok station. The plans fell through due to budgeting constraints.

G	Street level	Exit

L1; Concourse	Lobby	Customer Service, Shops, Vending machines, ATMs

L2; Platform level	Side platform, doors will open on the right
L2; Platform level	Westbound	← Line 6 toward Eungam (Terminus)
L2; Platform level	Side platform, doors will open on the left
L2; Platform level	Eastbound	Line 6 toward Sinnae (Jeungsan) →

== Exits ==
- Exit 1: Eungam Post Office, Eunpyeong School of Cultural Arts & Information
- Exit 2: Wasangyo, Daerim Market
- Exit 3: Yeonseo Middle School, Soongsil Middle & High School
- Exit 4: Sinsa Elementary School
