= Hongik University station =

Subway station in Seoul, South Korea

홍대입구; Hongik Univ.
홍대입구; Hongik Univ.
홍대입구; Hongik Univ.
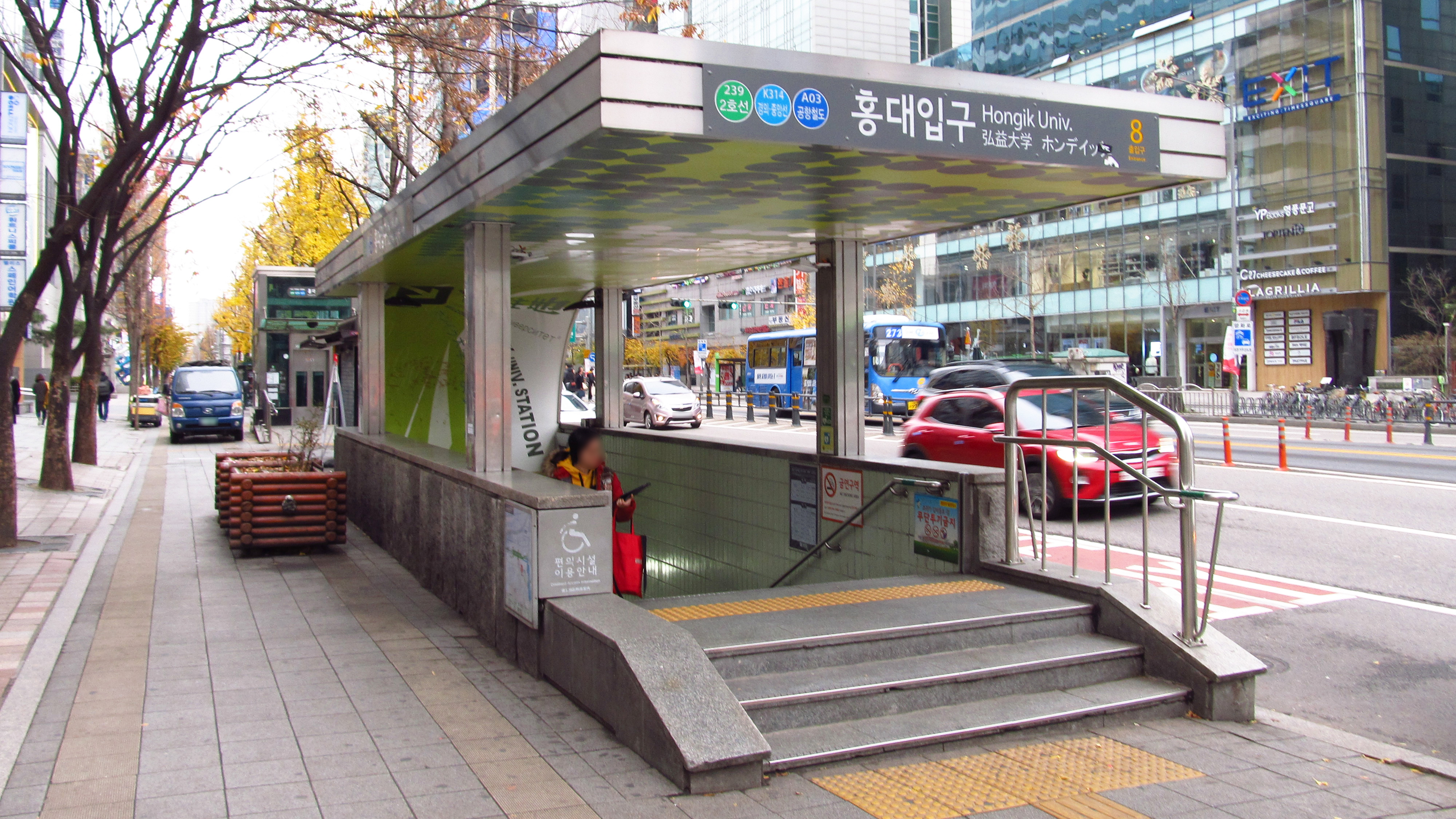
- Hongik University station entrance No. 8

Korean name
- Hangul: 홍대입구역
- Hanja: 弘大入口驛
- RR: Hongdaeipgu-yeok
- MR: Hongdaeipku-yŏk

General information
- Location: 160 Yanghwa-ro Jiha, 165 Donggyo-dong, Mapo-gu, Seoul
- Coordinates: 37°33′24″N 126°55′25″E
- Operator: Seoul Metro; Airport Railroad Co., Ltd. Korail
- Lines: Line 2 AREX; Gyeongui–Jungang Line
- Platforms: 3
- Tracks: 4

Construction
- Structure type: Underground

History
- Former names: Donggyo

Key dates
- 22 May 1984: Line 2 opened
- 29 December 2010: AREX opened
- 15 December 2012: Gyeongui–Jungang Line opened

Passengers
- (Daily) Based on Jan-Dec 2012. Line 2: 126,722; AREX: 10,616; Gyeongui–Jungang Line: 820
Services
Preceding station	Seoul Metropolitan Subway	Following station
Hapjeong Next counterclockwise	Line 2	Sinchon Next clockwise
Gongdeok towards Seoul Station	AREX	Digital Media City towards Incheon International Airport Terminal 2
Gajwa towards Munsan	Gyeongui–Jungang Line	Sogang University towards Jipyeong
Gajwa towards Munsan	Gyeongui–Jungang Line Jungang Express	Sogang University towards Yongmun
Gajwa towards Munsan	Gyeongui–Jungang Line Gyeongui Express	Gongdeok towards Yongmun
Location

Hongik University station (Korean: 홍대입구역) is a station on Seoul Subway Line 2, AREX and the Gyeongui–Jungang Line. As its name indicates, it serves the nearby Hongik University. It was formerly known as Donggyo station, after the neighborhood that it serves.

As of December 2010, it has become a transfer station to AREX and also was connected to the Gyeongui–Jungang Line. It will become the terminus station of the forthcoming Daejang–Hongdae Line planned to open in 2031.

== Gallery ==
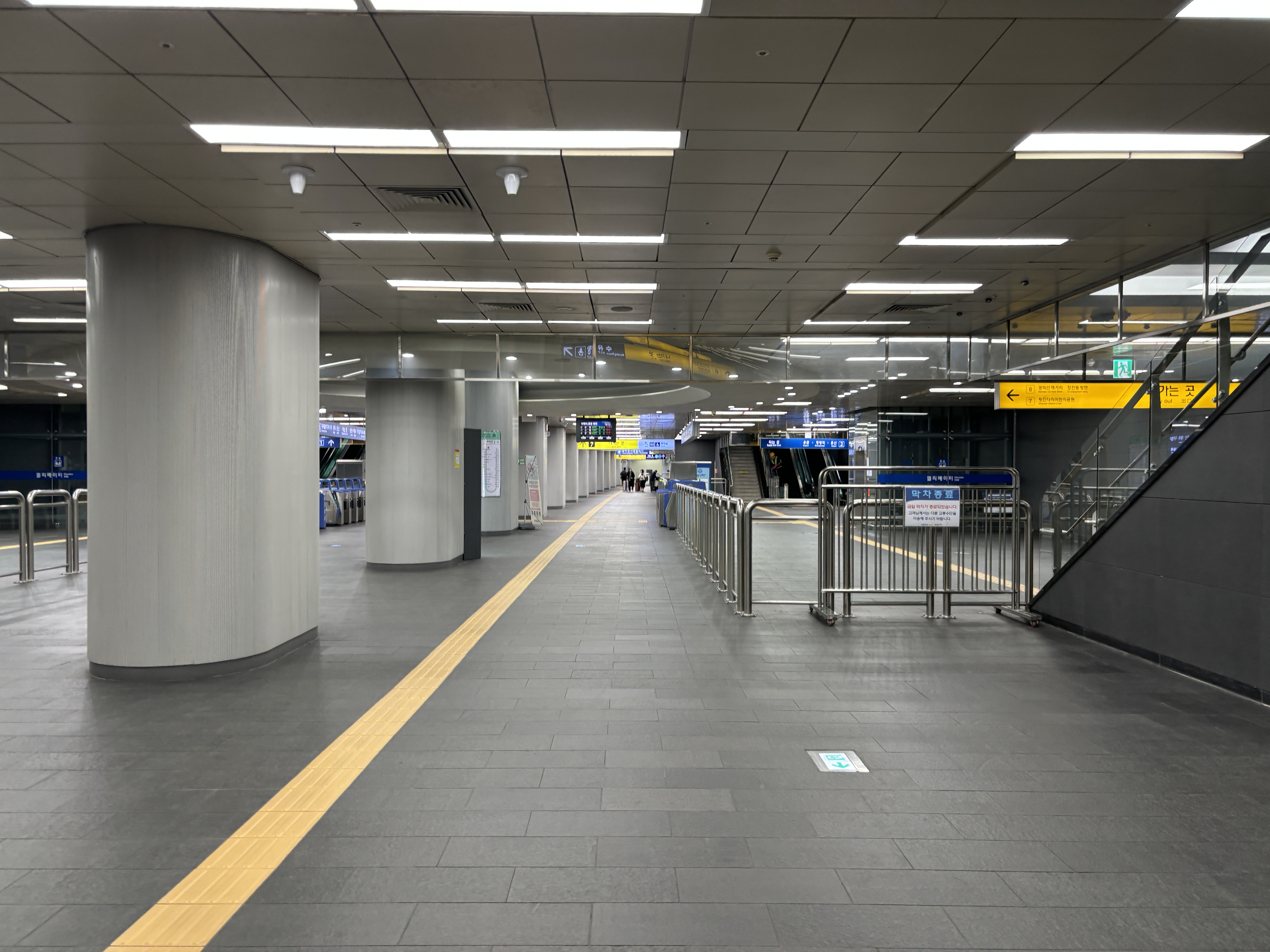
Station concourse

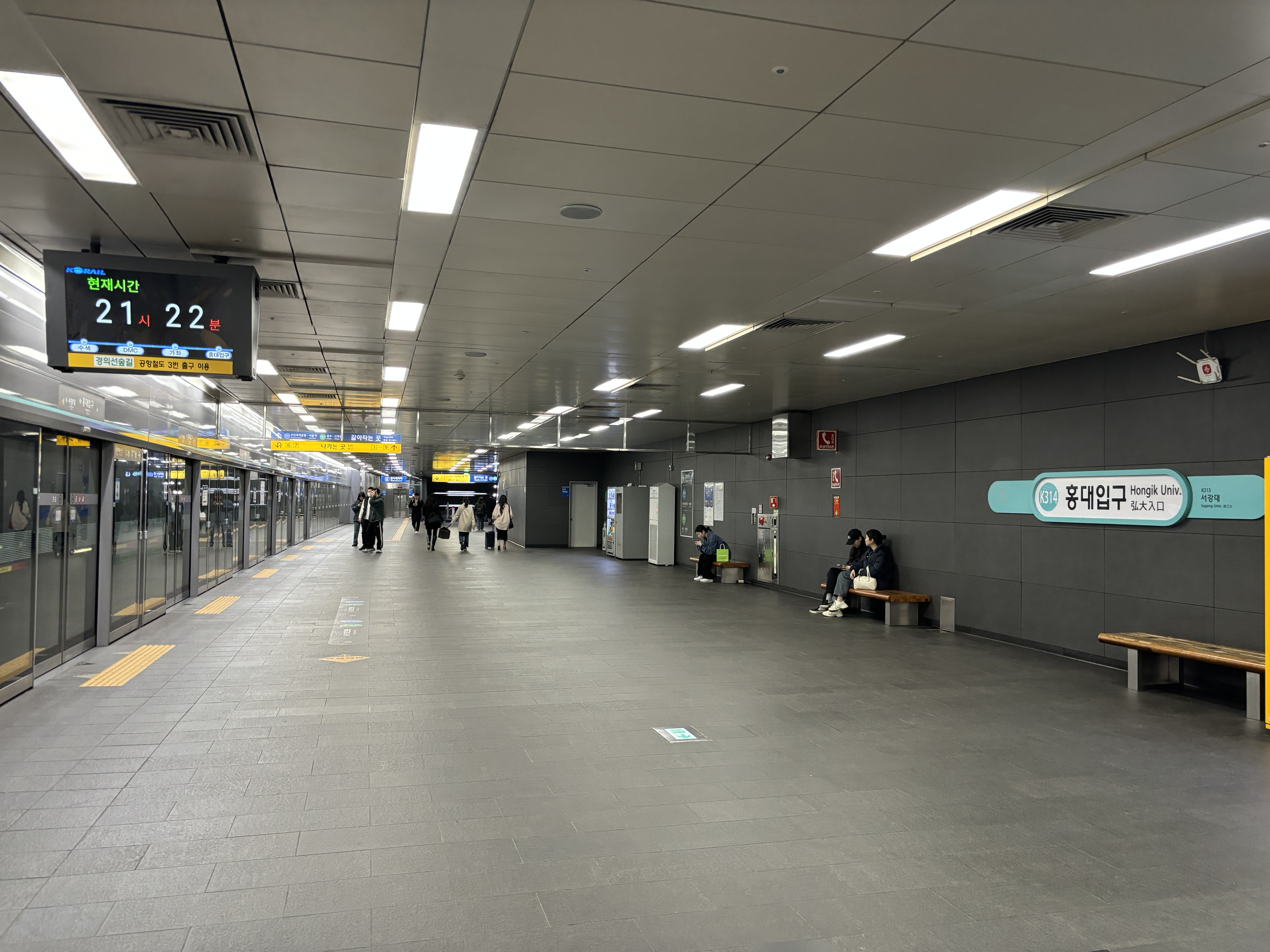
Gyeongui–Jungang Line eastbound platform

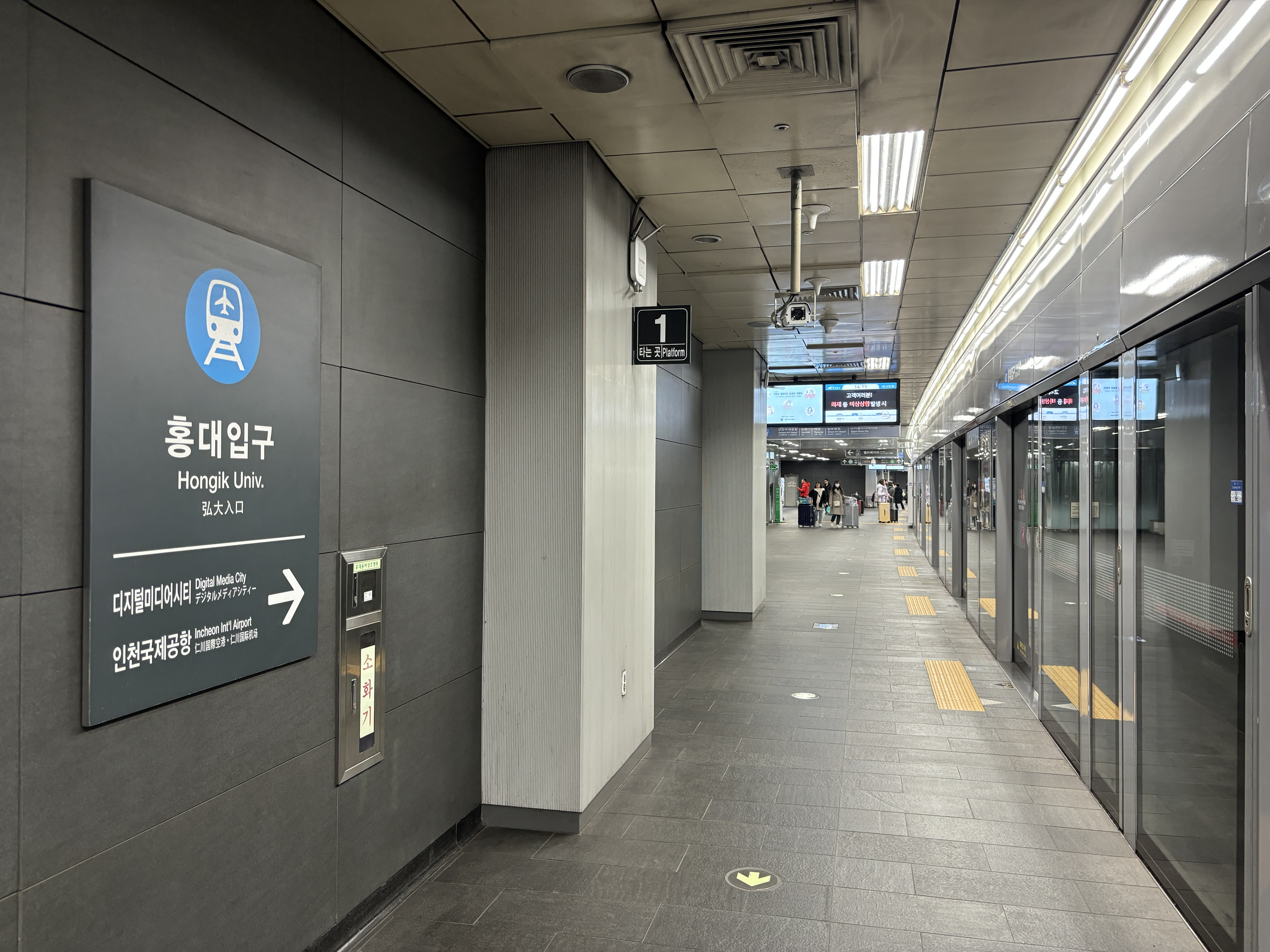
AREX Platform

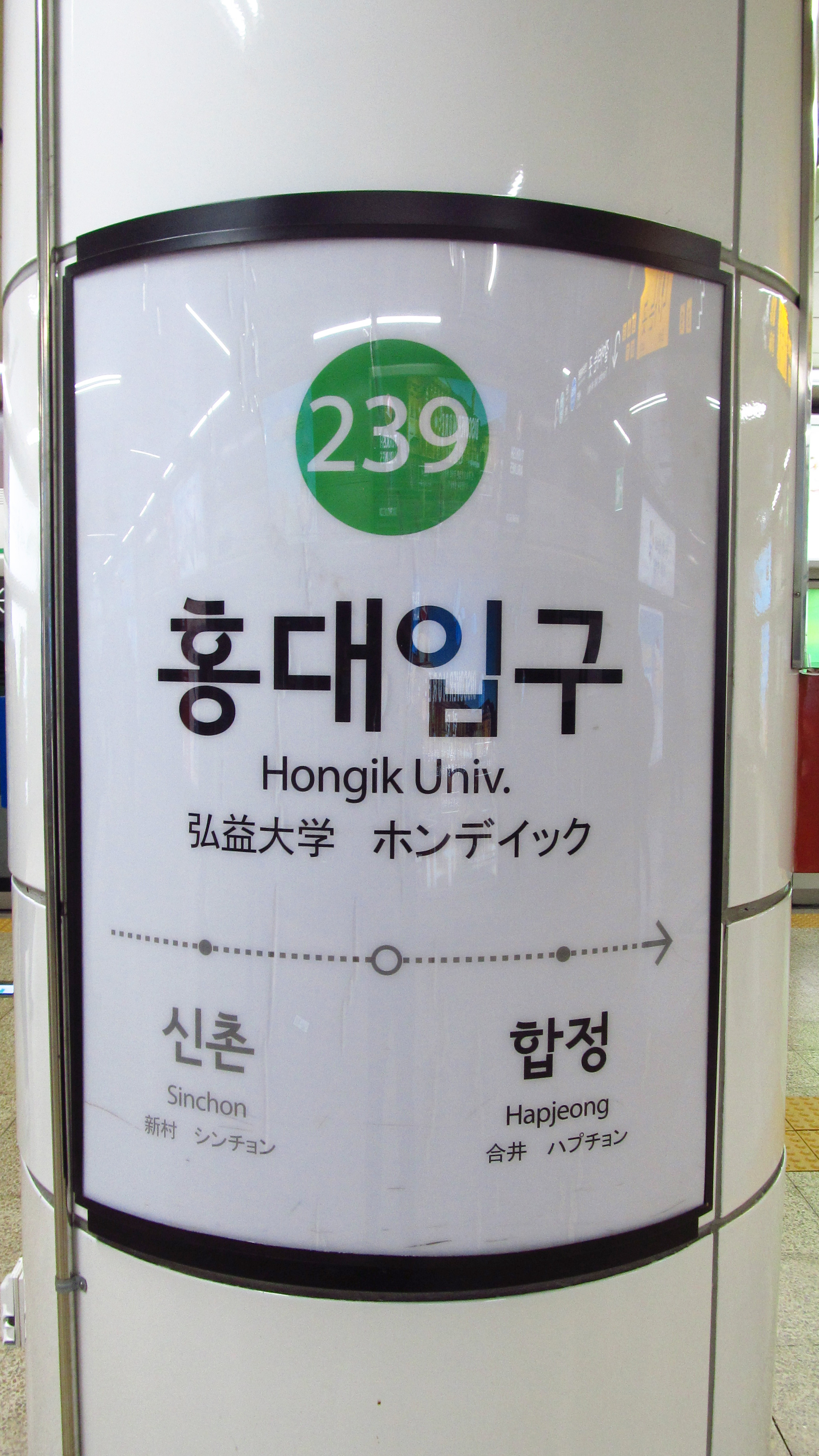
Station sign (Line 2)

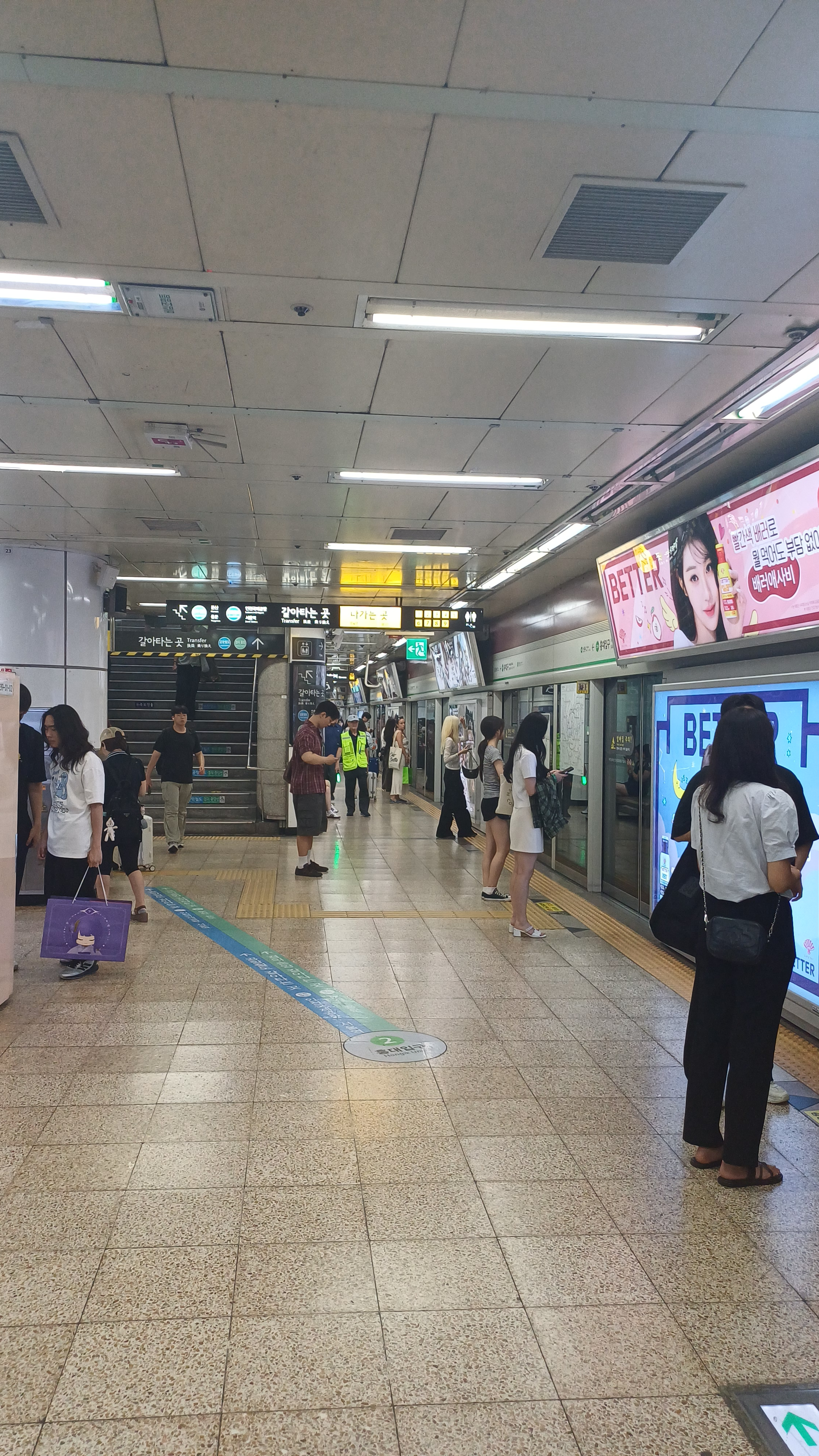
Line 2 Platform

== Vicinity ==
The Hongdae area around the station and the university is notable for its urban street arts and indie music culture, clubs and entertainment. It also serves Incheon International Airport.

Line 2

- Exit 4: access to the eponymous coffee shop used as filming location for 2007 Munhwa Broadcasting Corporation (MBC) television drama The 1st Shop of Coffee Prince. Also, AK Plaza Hongdae is located right in front.
- Exit 6: access to Hongdae Playground Park
- Exit 9: known as a busy meeting area.

== See also ==
- Hongdae (area)
