= Hyochang Park station =

Train station in South Korea

Coordinates: 37°32′21″N 126°57′41″E

효창공원앞; Hyochang Park
효창공원앞; Hyochang Park
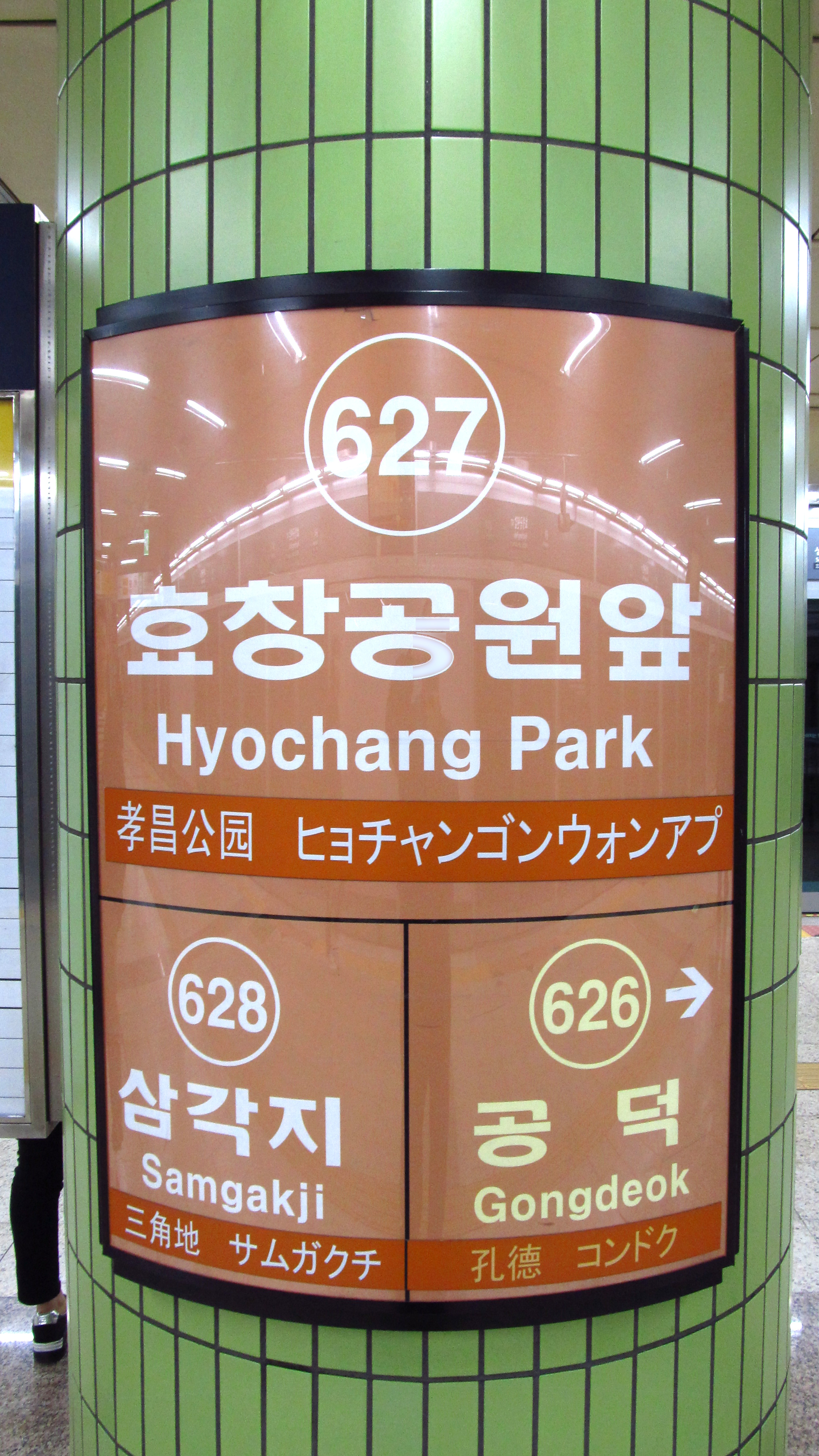
- Station sign (Line 6)

Korean name
- Hangul: 효창공원앞역
- Hanja: 孝昌公園앞驛
- Revised Romanization: Hyochanggongwonap-yeok
- McCune–Reischauer: Hyoch'anggongwŏnap-yŏk

General information
- Location: Line 6 287 Baekbomno, Yongsan-gu, Seoul; Gyeongui–Jungang Line 54 Wonhyo-ro 71-gil, Yongsan-gu, Seoul
- Operator: Seoul Metro; Korail
- Lines: Line 6 Gyeongui–Jungang Line
- Platforms: 3
- Tracks: 4

Construction
- Structure type: Underground

Key dates
- December 15, 2000: Line 6 opened
- April 30, 2016: Gyeongui–Jungang Line opened
Location

Hyochang Park station is a subway station on Seoul Subway Line 6 and the Gyeongui–Jungang Line. It is named after Hyochang Park. Nearby is the Hyochang Stadium, a small field capable of hosting sports events. The Yongsan district office is also nearby.

== Station layout ==
G	Street level	Exit

L1; Concourse	Lobby	Customer service, shops, vending machines, ATMs

L2; Platform level	Side platform, doors will open on the right
L2; Platform level	Westbound	← Gyeongui–Jungang Line toward Munsan (Gongdeok)
L2; Platform level	Eastbound	Gyeongui–Jungang Line toward Yongmun (Yongsan) →
L2; Platform level	Side platform, doors will open on the right

L3; Platform level	Westbound	← Line 6 toward Eungam (Gongdeok)
L3; Platform level	Island platform, doors will open on the left
L3; Platform level	Eastbound	Line 6 toward Sinnae (Samgakji) →

== Gallery ==
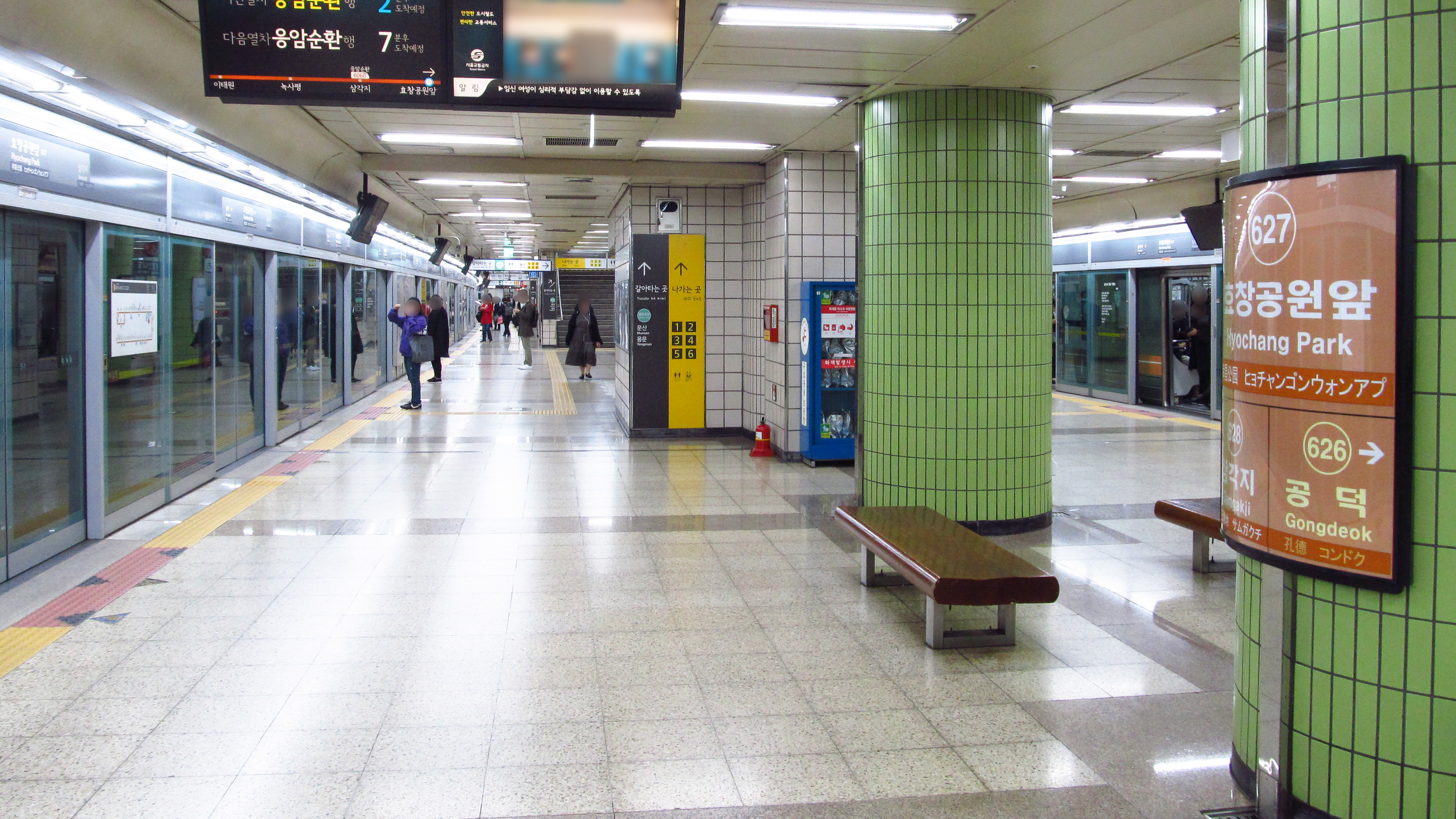
Line 6 platforms

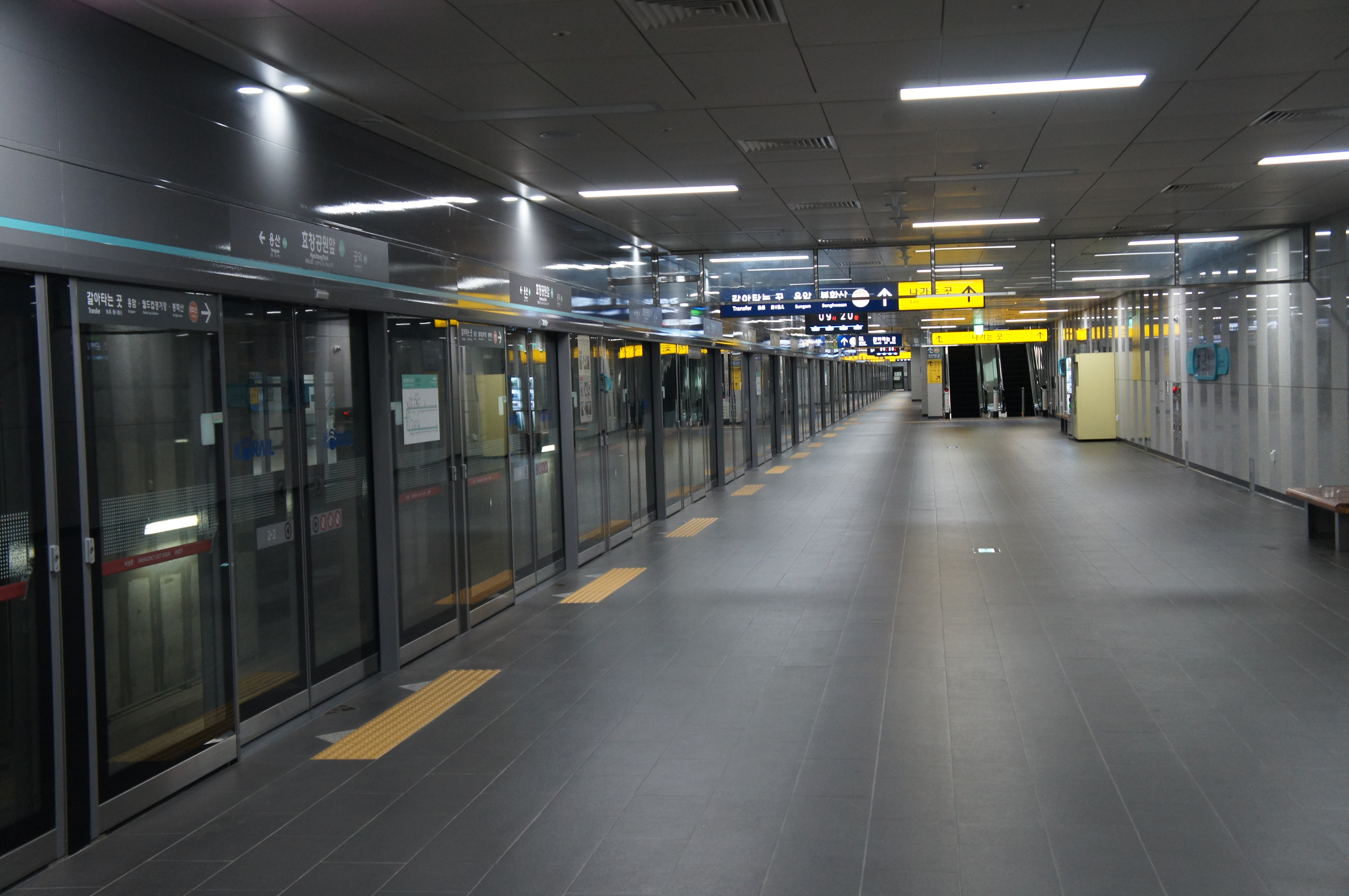
Gyeongui–Jungang Line platforms

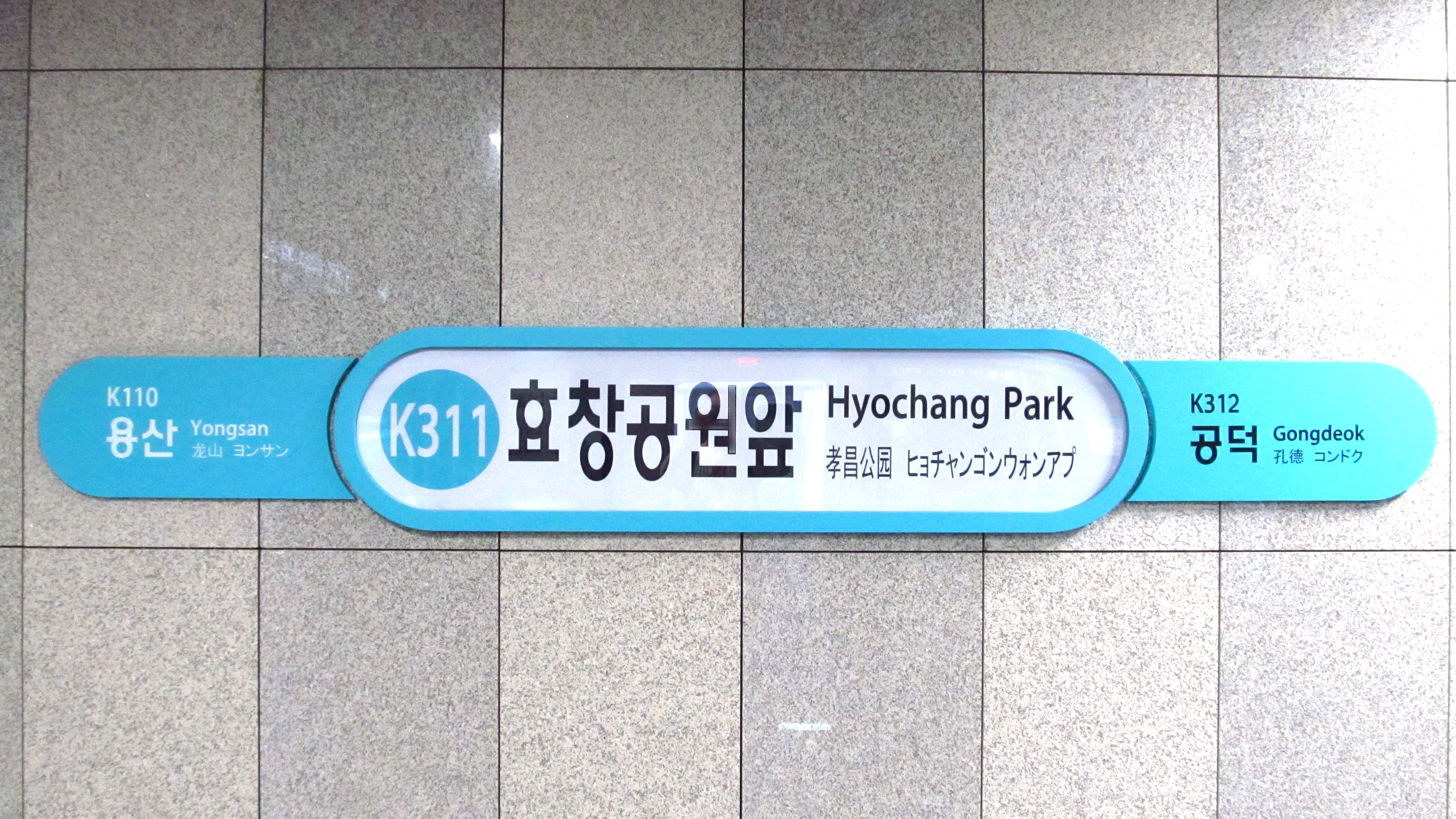
Station sign (Gyeongui-Jungang Line)

Preceding station	Seoul Metropolitan Subway	Following station
Gongdeok towards Eungam	Line 6	Samgakji towards Sinnae
Gongdeok towards Munsan	Gyeongui–Jungang Line	Yongsan towards Jipyeong
Gongdeok towards Munsan	Gyeongui–Jungang Line Jungang Express	Yongsan towards Yongmun
