= Gongdeok station =

Train station in South Korea

공덕; Gongdeok
공덕; Gongdeok
공덕; Gongdeok
공덕; Gongdeok
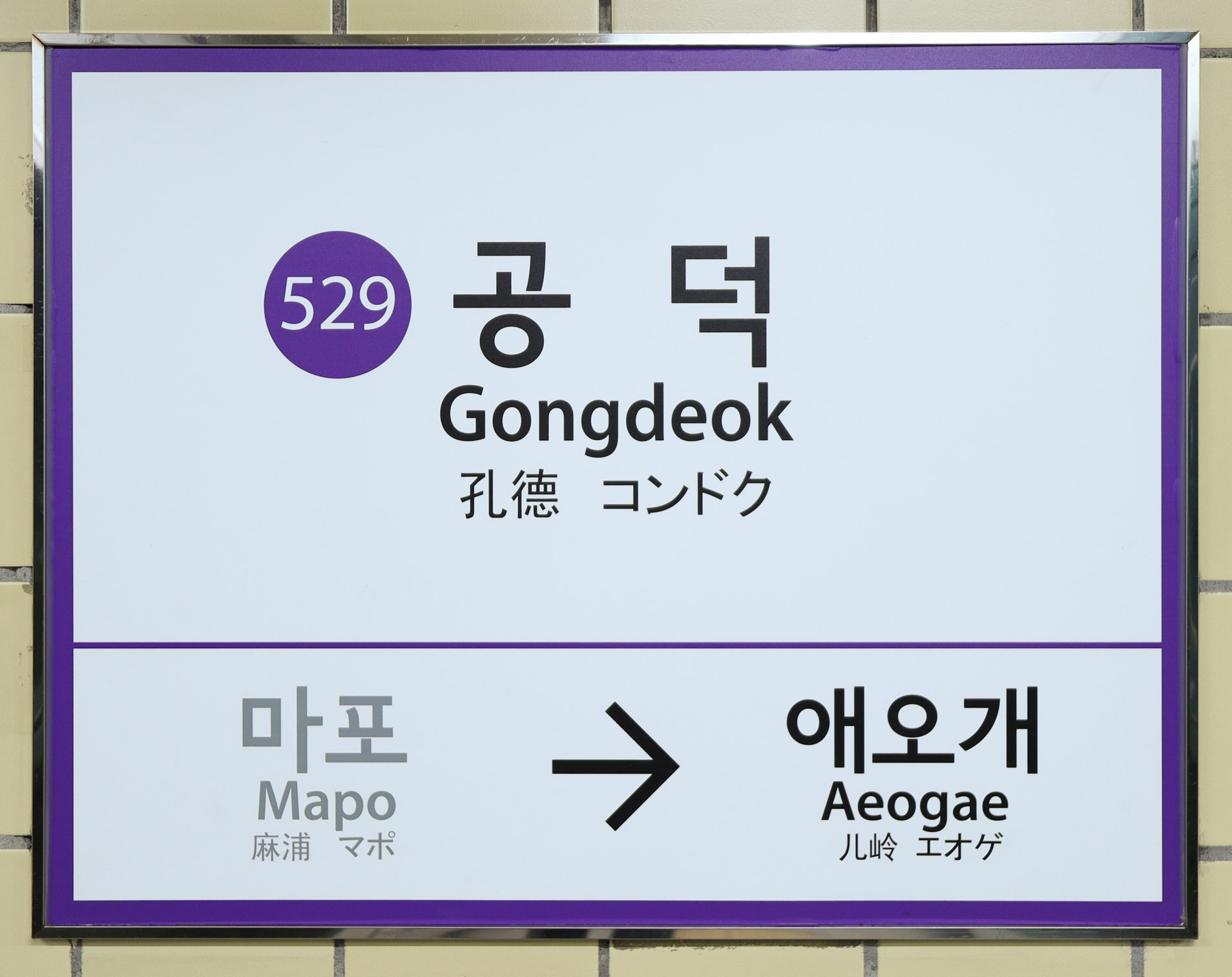
- Line 5 station nameplate

Korean name
- Hangul: 공덕역
- Hanja: 孔德驛
- RR: Gongdeok-yeok
- MR: Kongdŏk-yŏk

General information
- Location: 423 Gongdeok-dong, Mapo-gu, Seoul
- Coordinates: 37°32′35″N 126°57′04″E
- Operator: Seoul Metro; Airport Railroad Co., Ltd. Korail
- Lines: Line 5 Line 6 AREX; Gyeongui–Jungang Line
- Platforms: 5
- Tracks: 6

Construction
- Structure type: Underground

Key dates
- December 30, 1996: Line 5 opened
- December 15, 2000: Line 6 opened
- November 30, 2011: AREX opened
- December 15, 2012: Gyeongui–Jungang Line opened
Services
Preceding station	Seoul Metropolitan Subway	Following station
Mapo towards Banghwa	Line 5	Aeogae towards Hanam Geomdansan or Macheon
Daeheung towards Eungam	Line 6	Hyochang Park towards Sinnae
Seoul towards Seoul Station	AREX	Hongik University towards Incheon International Airport Terminal 2
Sogang University towards Munsan	Gyeongui–Jungang Line	Hyochang Park towards Jipyeong
Hongik University towards Munsan	Gyeongui–Jungang Line Gyeongui Express	Yongsan towards Yongmun
Sogang University towards Munsan	Gyeongui–Jungang Line Jungang Express	Hyochang Park towards Yongmun
Location

Gongdeok Station is a subway station on Seoul Subway Line 5, Line 6, AREX and the Gyeongui–Jungang Line.

Gongdeok Market, near Exit 4 of the station, is on the Seoul list of Asia's 10 greatest street food cities for the haemulpajeon.

== Gallery ==
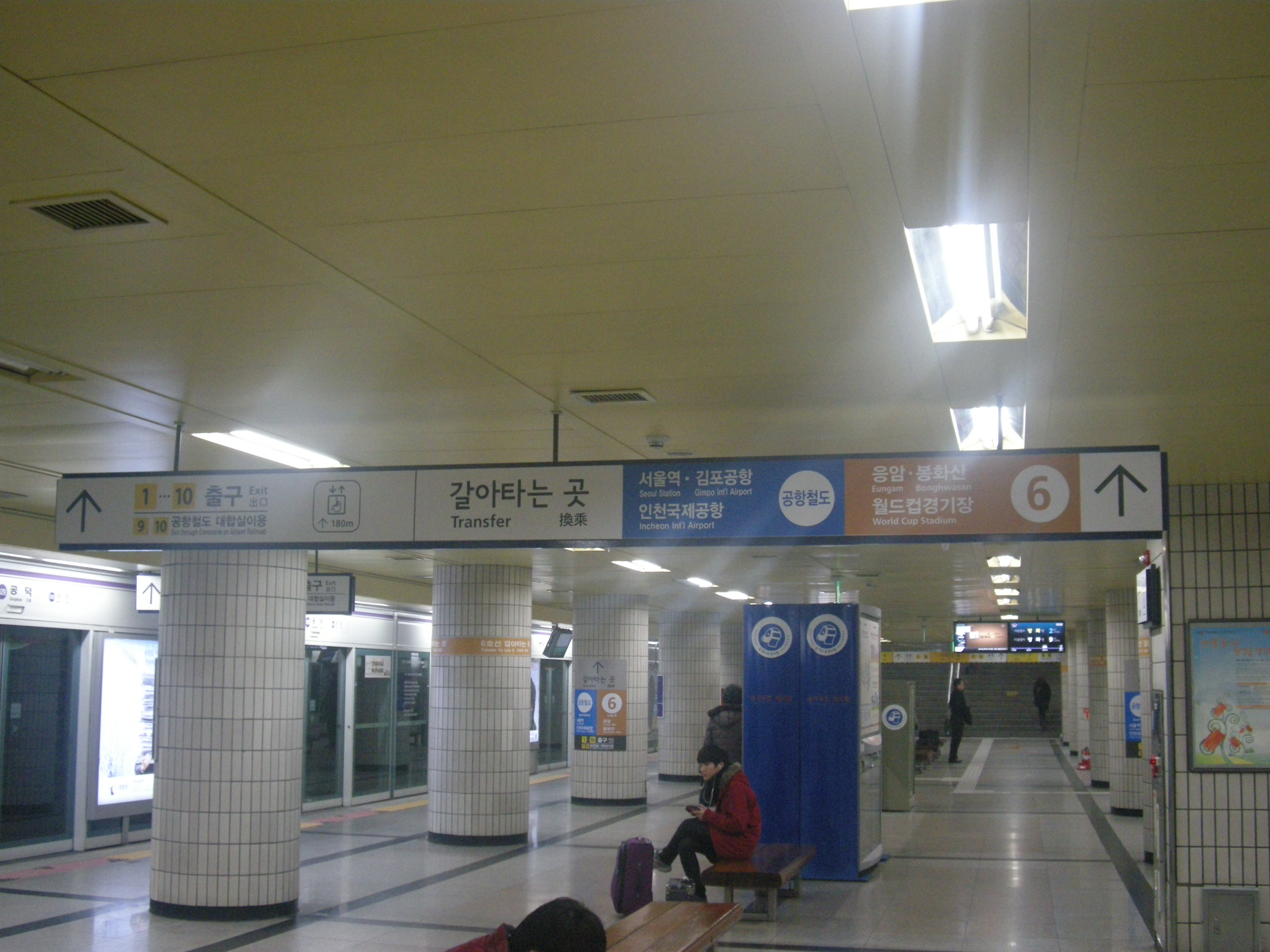
Gongdeok station, December 2012

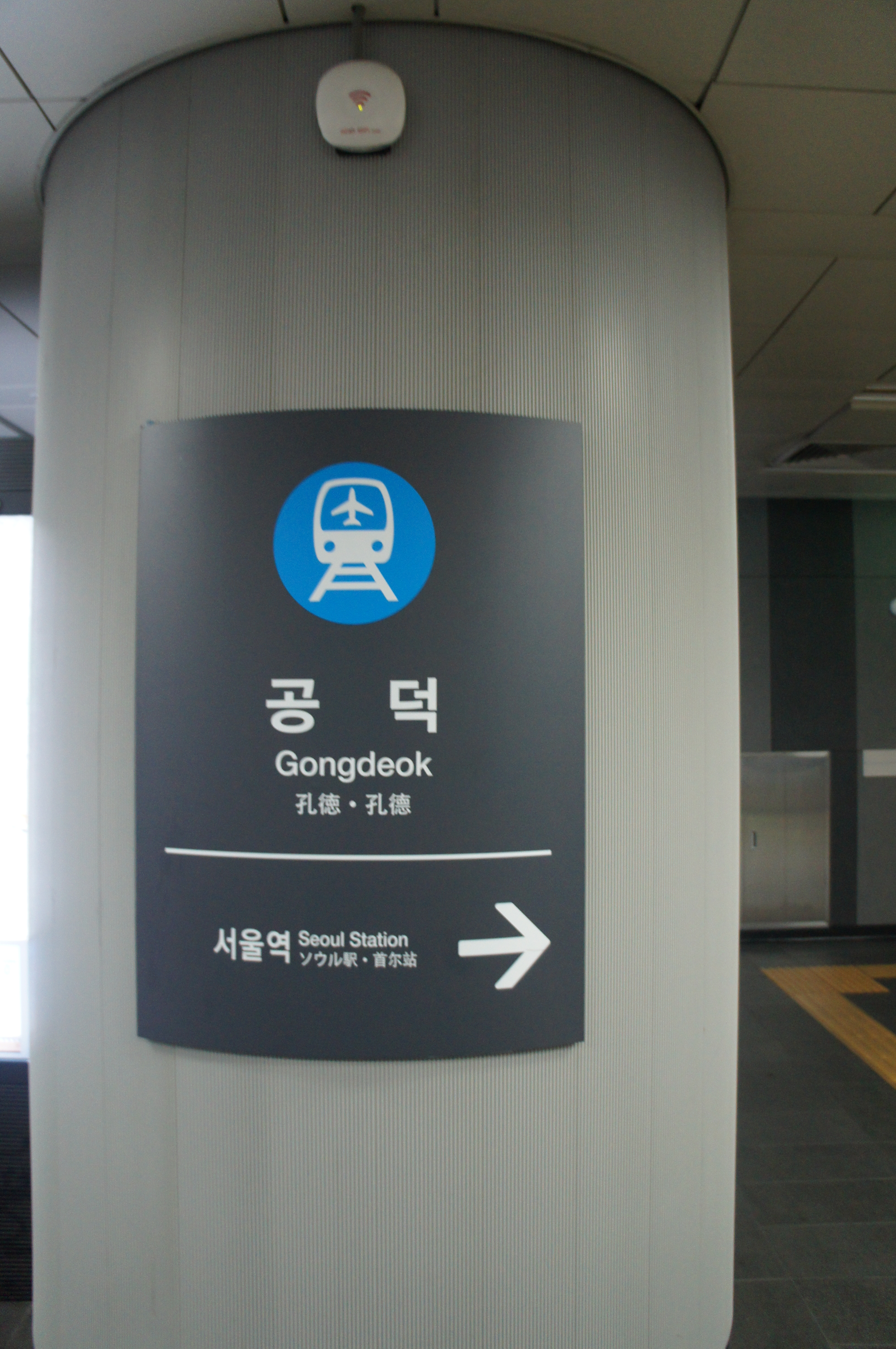
AREX station nameplate

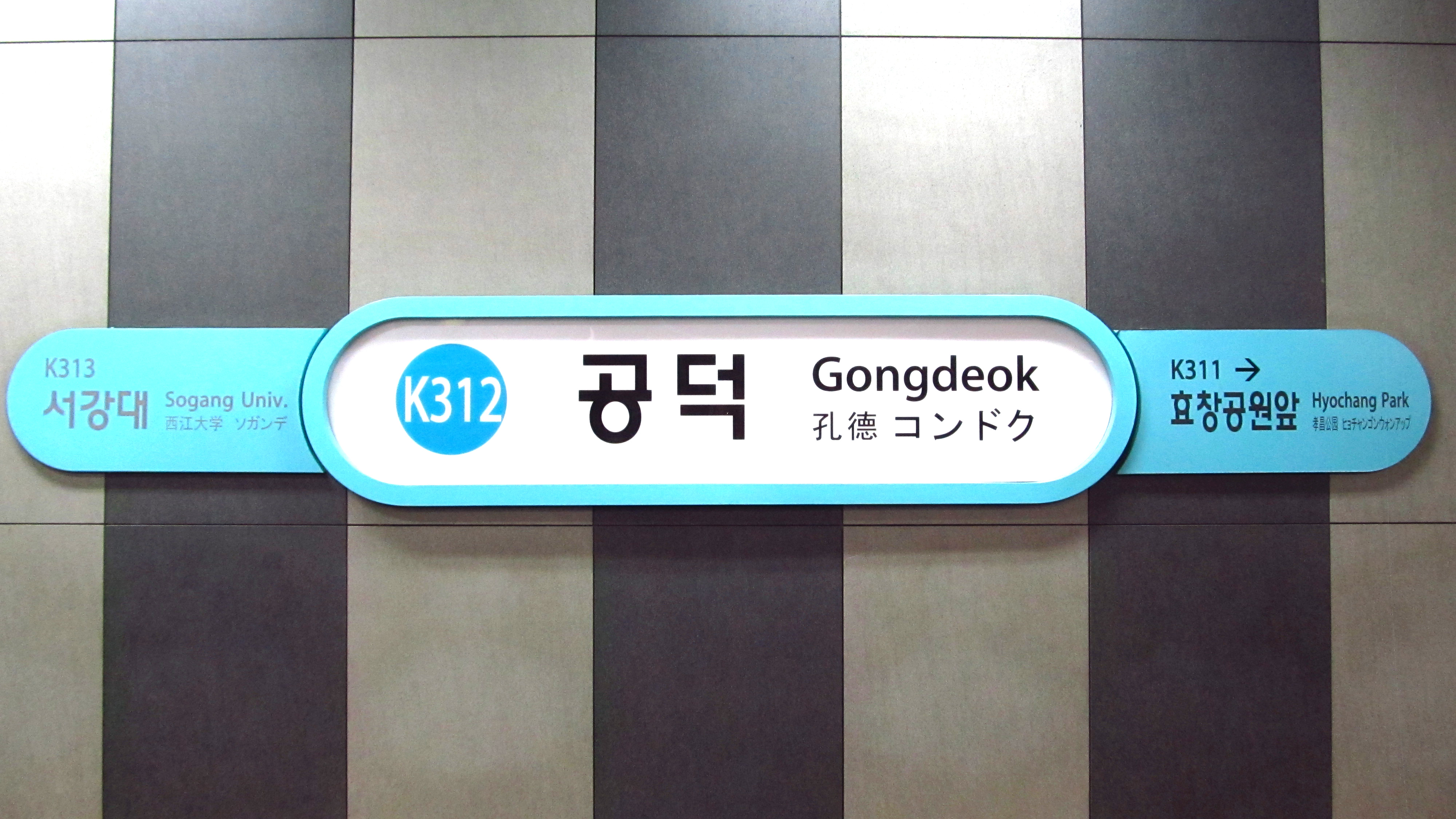
Gyeongui–Jungang Line station nameplate

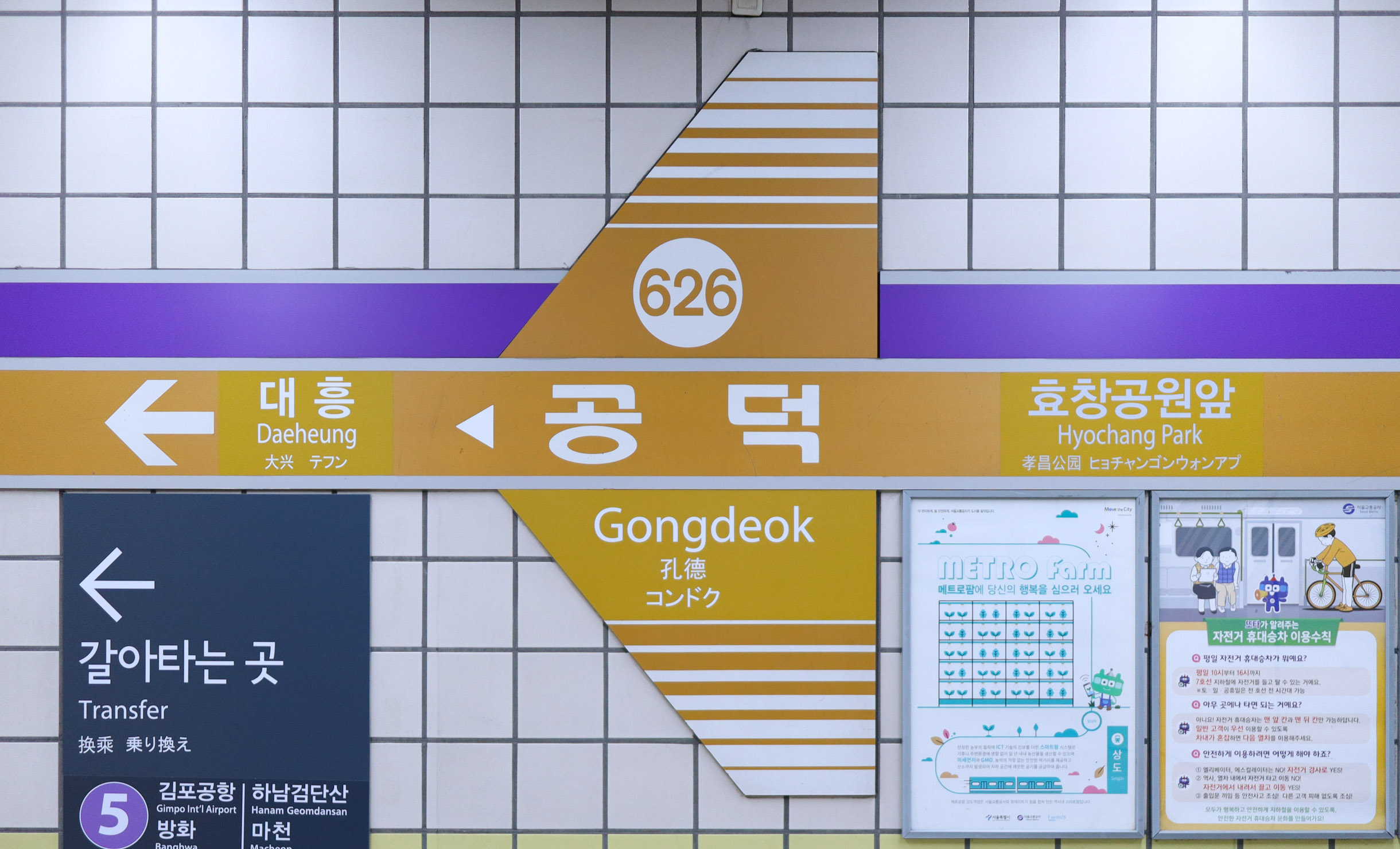
Line 6 station nameplate

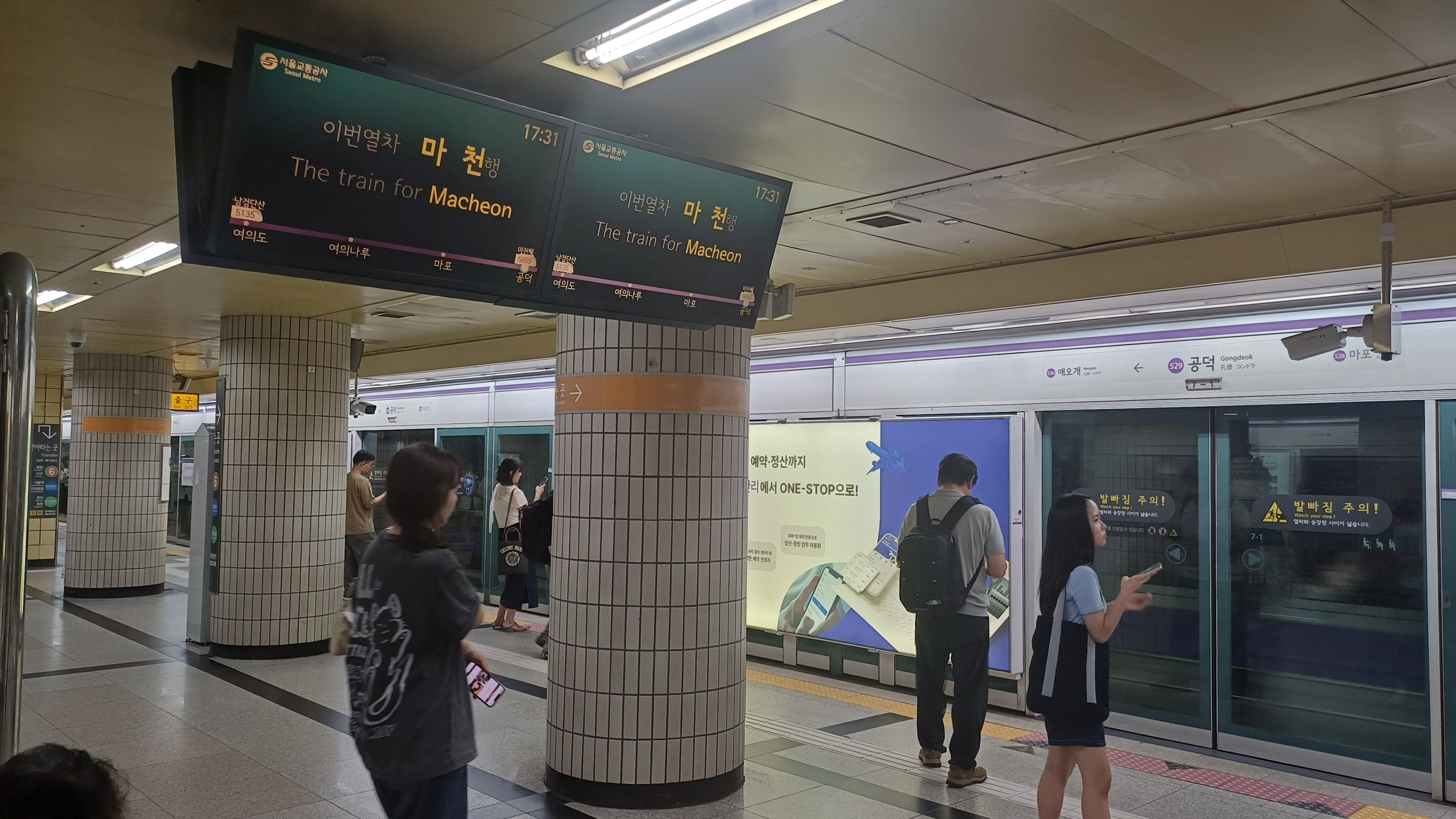
Line 5 platform

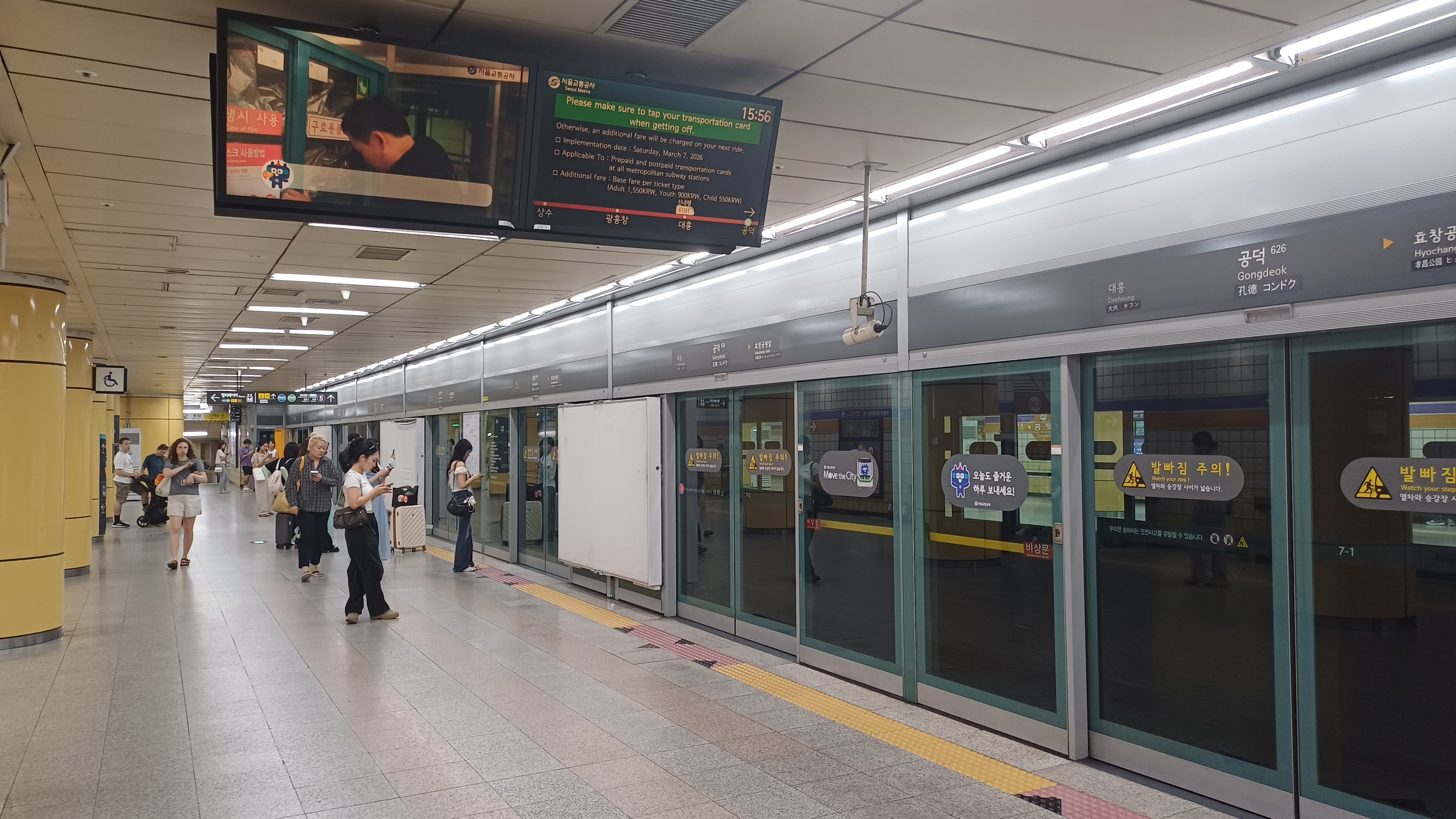
Line 6 platform

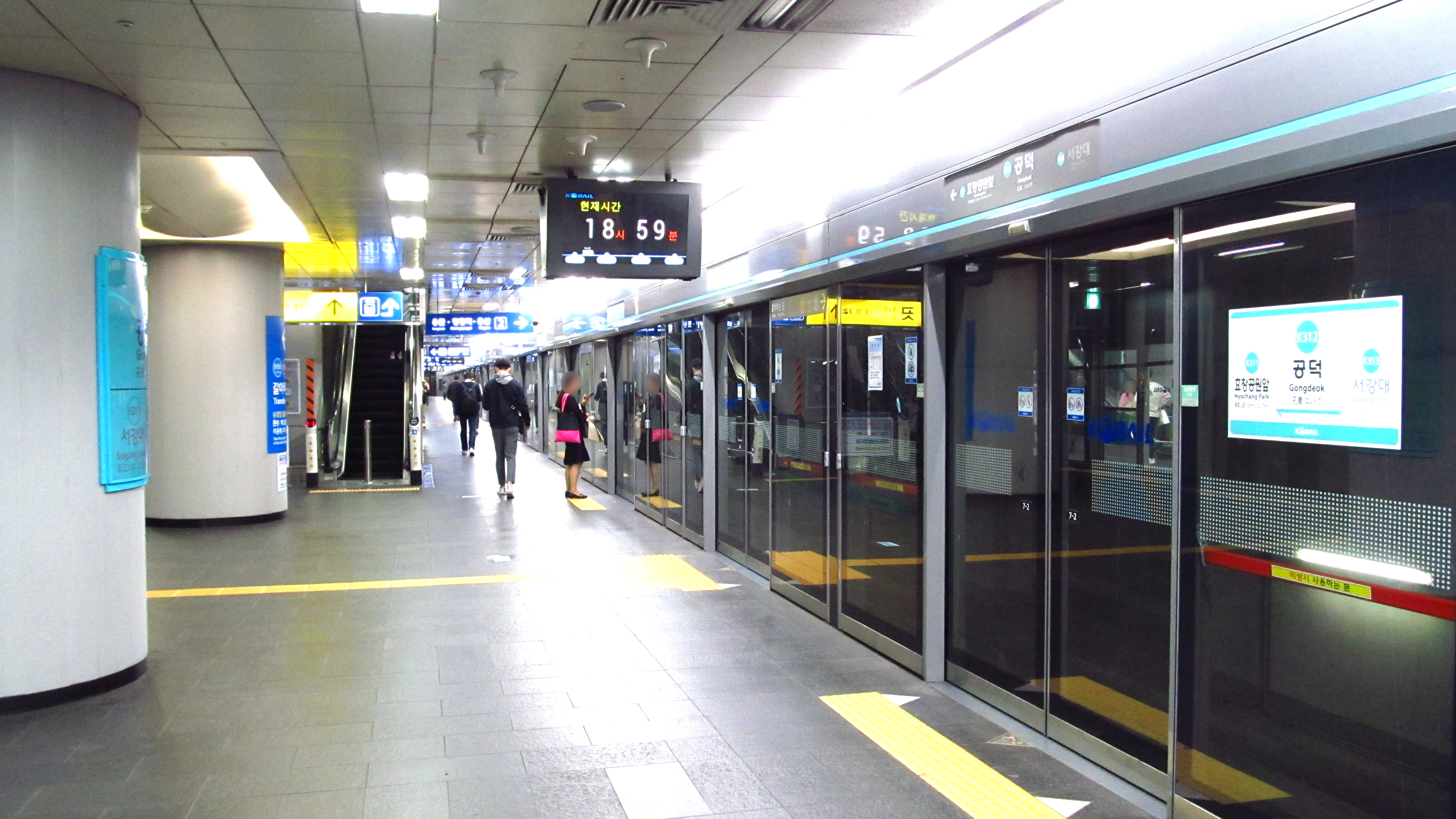
Gyeongui-Jungang Line platform

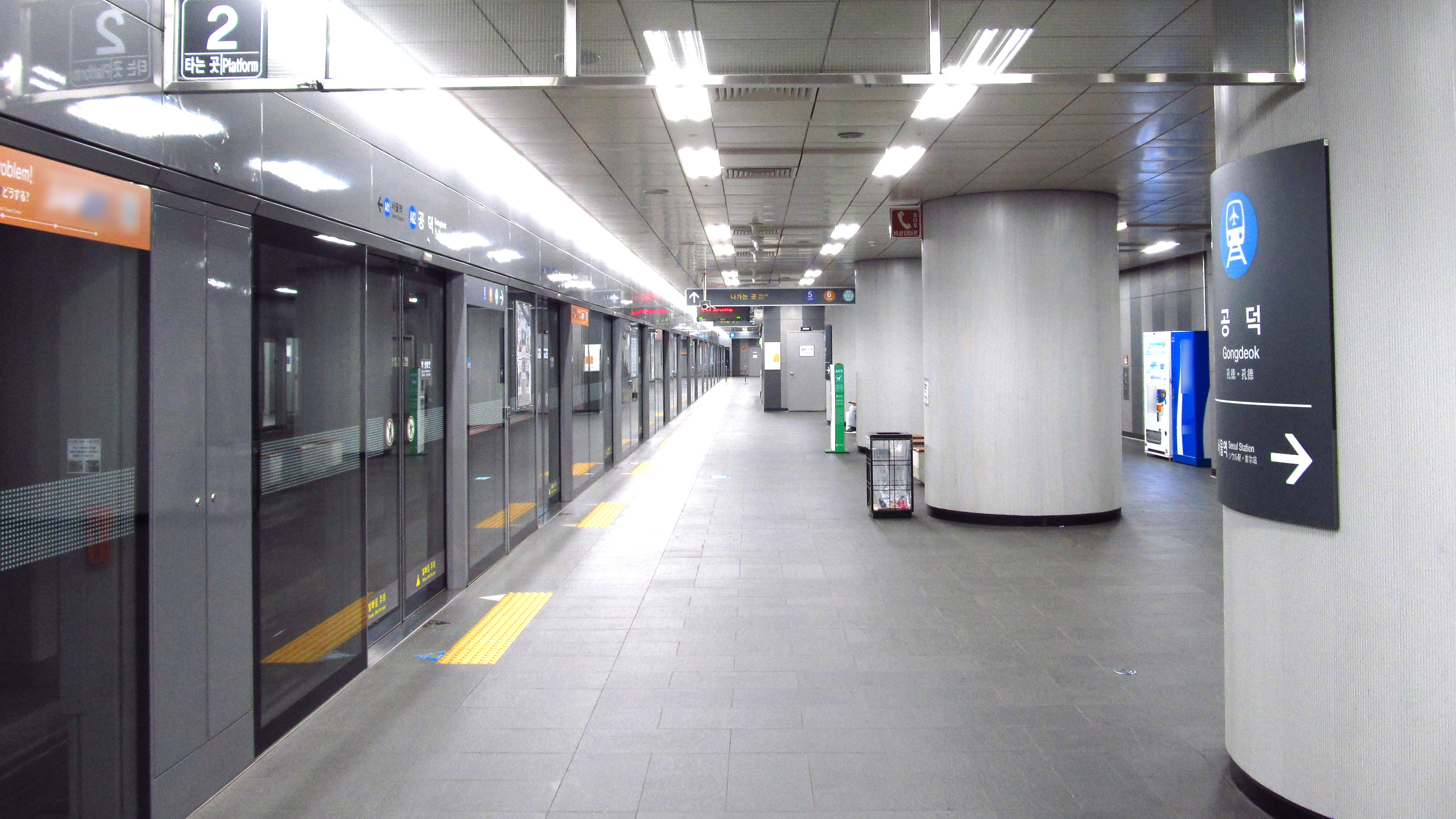
AREX platform
