= Sogang University station =

Station of the Seoul Metropolitan Subway

서강대; Sogang Univ.
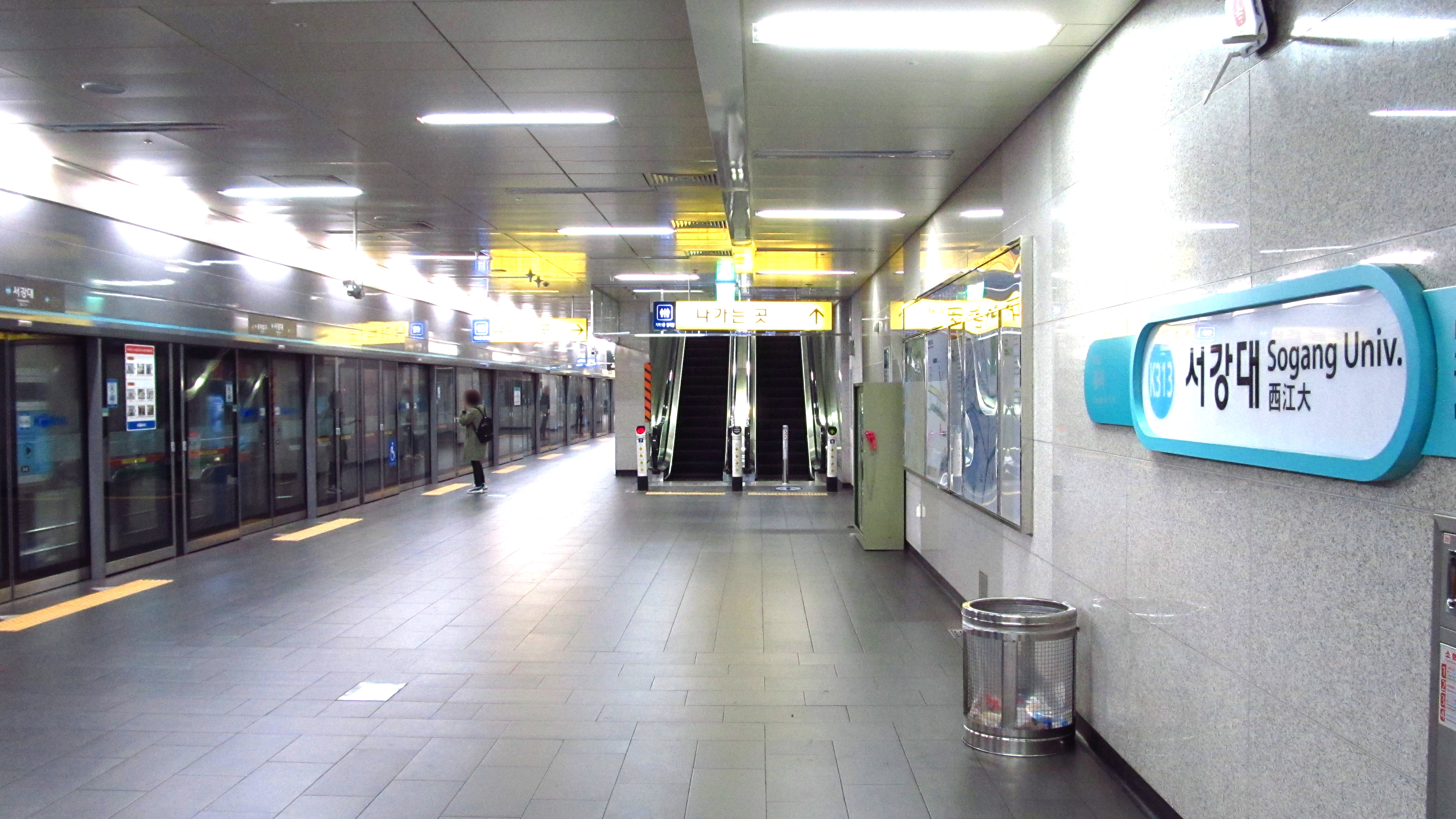
- Sogang University Station platform

Korean name
- Hangul: 서강대역
- Hanja: 西江大驛
- Revised Romanization: Seogangdaeyeok
- McCune–Reischauer: Sŏgangdaeyŏk

General information
- Location: 112-5 Nogosan-dong, Mapo-gu, Seoul
- Coordinates: 37°33′08″N 126°56′07″E
- Operated by: Korail
- Line: Gyeongui–Jungang Line
- Platforms: 2
- Tracks: 2

Construction
- Structure type: Underground

History
- Opened: December 1, 1929

Key dates
- December 15, 2012: Gyeongui–Jungang Line underground platforms opened
Location

Sogang University Station is a station on the Gyeongui–Jungang Line in Seoul, South Korea. Seogang Station was renamed Sogang University Station on March 17, 2014.

== History ==
It was opened as Seogang Station on December 1, 1929, but its operation was suspended in 2005 due to the construction of the Gyeongui Central Railway and the Incheon International Airport Railway. It was reopened on December 15, 2012 as a station on the Gyeongui-Jungang Line.

It is located between Gongdeok and Hongik Univ. on the Gyeongui-Jungang Line.

== Nearby facilities ==
Sogang University, Nogosan Mountain, Sinchon Yonsei Hospital, and Wawasan Mountain are located nearby.

Preceding station	Seoul Metropolitan Subway	Following station
Hongik University towards Munsan	Gyeongui–Jungang Line	Gongdeok towards Jipyeong
Hongik University towards Munsan	Gyeongui–Jungang Line Jungang Express	Gongdeok towards Yongmun
