= Korail Class 331000 =

South Korean train

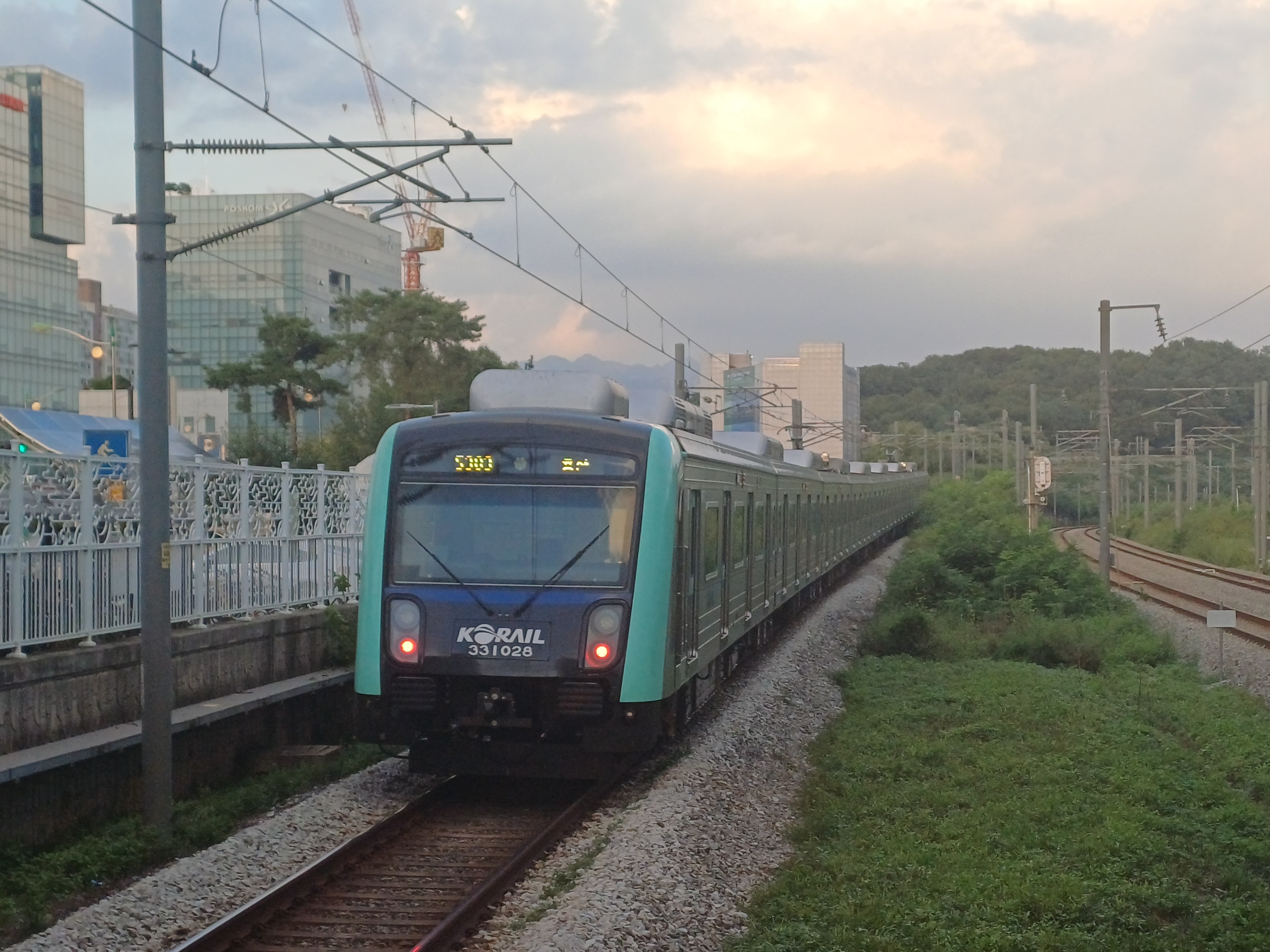
- Class 331000 (second generation) train 331-28
- Stock type: Electric multiple unit
- In service: 2009–present
- Manufacturer: Hyundai Rotem
- Constructed: 2009 (1st generation, 1st batch); 2012–2014 (1st generation, 2nd batch); 2024 (2nd generation)
- Formation: 8 or 4 cars per train TC-M-M'-T-T-M-M'-TC
- Operator: Korail
- Depot: Munsan
- Line served: Gyeongui-Jungang Line

Specifications
- Car body construction: Steel
- Car length: 19,500 millimetres (770 in)
- Width: 3,120 millimetres (123 in)
- Height: 3,750 millimetres (148 in)
- Doors: 4 per side, 8 per car
- Maximum speed: 110 km/h (68 mph)
- Traction system: Toshiba COVO52-A0 IGBT-VVVF (1st generation); Woojin IGBT-VVVF (some 1st generation sets); Hyundai Rotem IPM IGBT-VVVF (2nd generation)
- Power output: 4,400 kW (5,900 hp)
- Acceleration: 3.0 km/(h⋅s) (1.9 mph/s)
- Deceleration: 3.5 km/(h⋅s) (2.2 mph/s) (service); 4.5 km/(h⋅s) (2.8 mph/s) (emergency)
- Electric system: 25 kV 60 Hz AC
- Current collection: Pantograph
- Safety system: ATS
- Coupling system: Shibata-type
- Headlight type: Light-emitting diode
- Track gauge: 1,435 mm (4 ft 8 1/2 in)

The Korail Class 331000 trains are commuter electric multiple units in South Korea used on the Gyeongui·Jungang Line. Class 331000 trains were manufactured and delivered in 2009, from 2012 to 2014, and in 2024 to provide service on the Gyeongui Line and to address progressing extensions starting from the extension to Gongdeok station.

== Technical details ==
=== Electrical parts ===
All trains use IGBT controls and use passive cooling with a heat pipe. The trains are also equipped with regenerative braking, reducing energy consumption and simplifying train inspection, and they use electric door motors.

=== Interior design ===
The Class 331000 trains sport a white-colored, fire-retardant interior. LCD monitor displays are installed on the side of each car for trains 331-01~331-13, and on the top of each car for trains 331-14~331-27. The end cars have a space for wheelchairs.

=== Cabin ===
The Class 331000 trains share the same cabin design with the Class 321000 as many of the cars were derived from Class 331000 trains. Stop notifiers are installed, as are TGIS use color displays. Dead section notifiers are also installed.

== Formation ==
The Class 331000 trains are organized into two formations

- Trains 331-01~331-13 and 331-23~331-27, in an eight-car TC-M-M'-T-T-M-M'-TC formation.
- Trains 331-14~331-22, in a four-car TC-M'-M'-TC formation.

The symbols are defined below.

- M' car: Pantograph, main transformer, controller, motor
- M car: Motor, controller
- TC car: Secondary power device, air compressor, battery, cabin
- T car: trailer (unpowered)

The cars of each train are numbered to correspond to the type of car each car is: 3310XX - Tc (SIV, air compressor, battery) 3311XX - M (inverter) 3312XX - M' (pantograph, transformer, inverter) 3313XX - T (trailer) 3314XX - T (trailer) (this car on trains 331-14~331-22 are M' cars) 3315XX - M (inverter) 3316XX - M' (pantograph, transformer, inverter) 3319XX - Tc (SIV, air compressor, battery)

== Depot ==
The Class 331000 trains are stored at the Munsan train depot, which is a few kilometers south of Munsan station.

== Batches ==
=== 1st generation, 1st batch ===
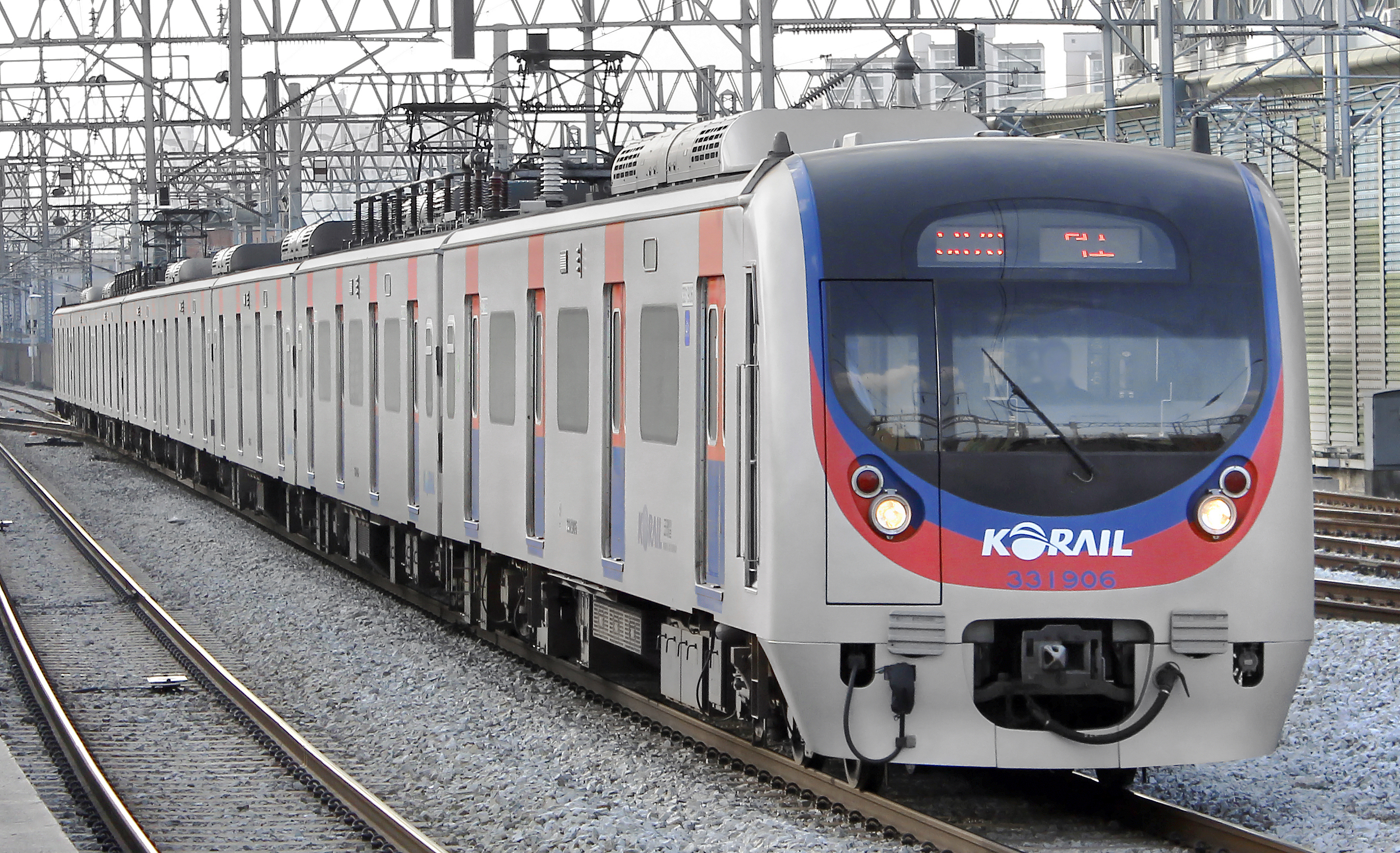
Class 331000 (first batch) train 331-06

The first batch of Class 331000 trains were introduced in 2009 for the opening of what was known the Gyeongui Line at the time.

The first batch trains are numbered 331-01~331-13. The trains have new, smoother aluminium bodies, but they use the same front end design as the third batch Class 321000 trains. The first batch trains have LCD monitors on the sides (above the doors).

=== 1st generation, 2nd batch ===
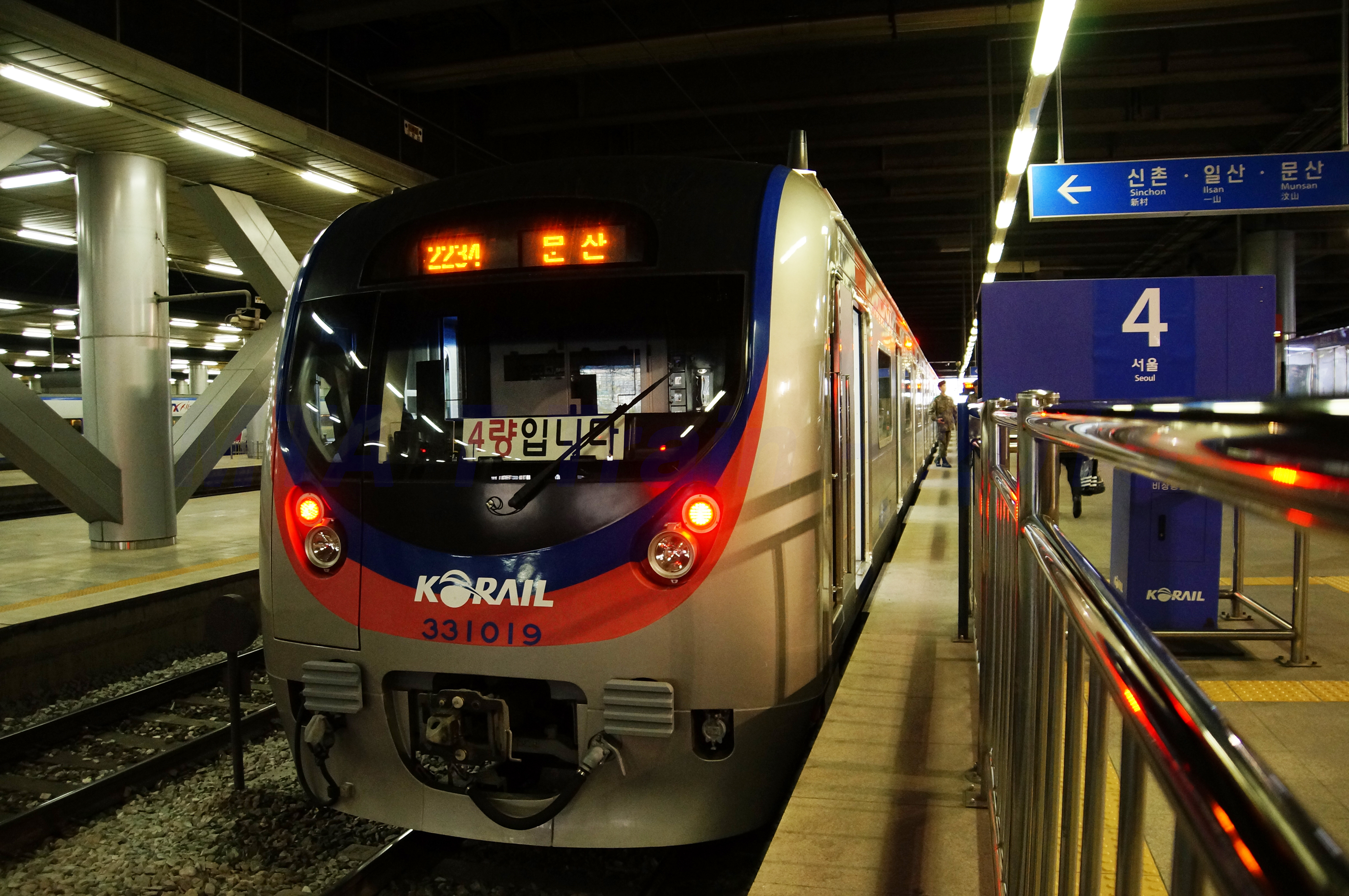
Class 331000 (second batch) train 331-19 at Seoul Station

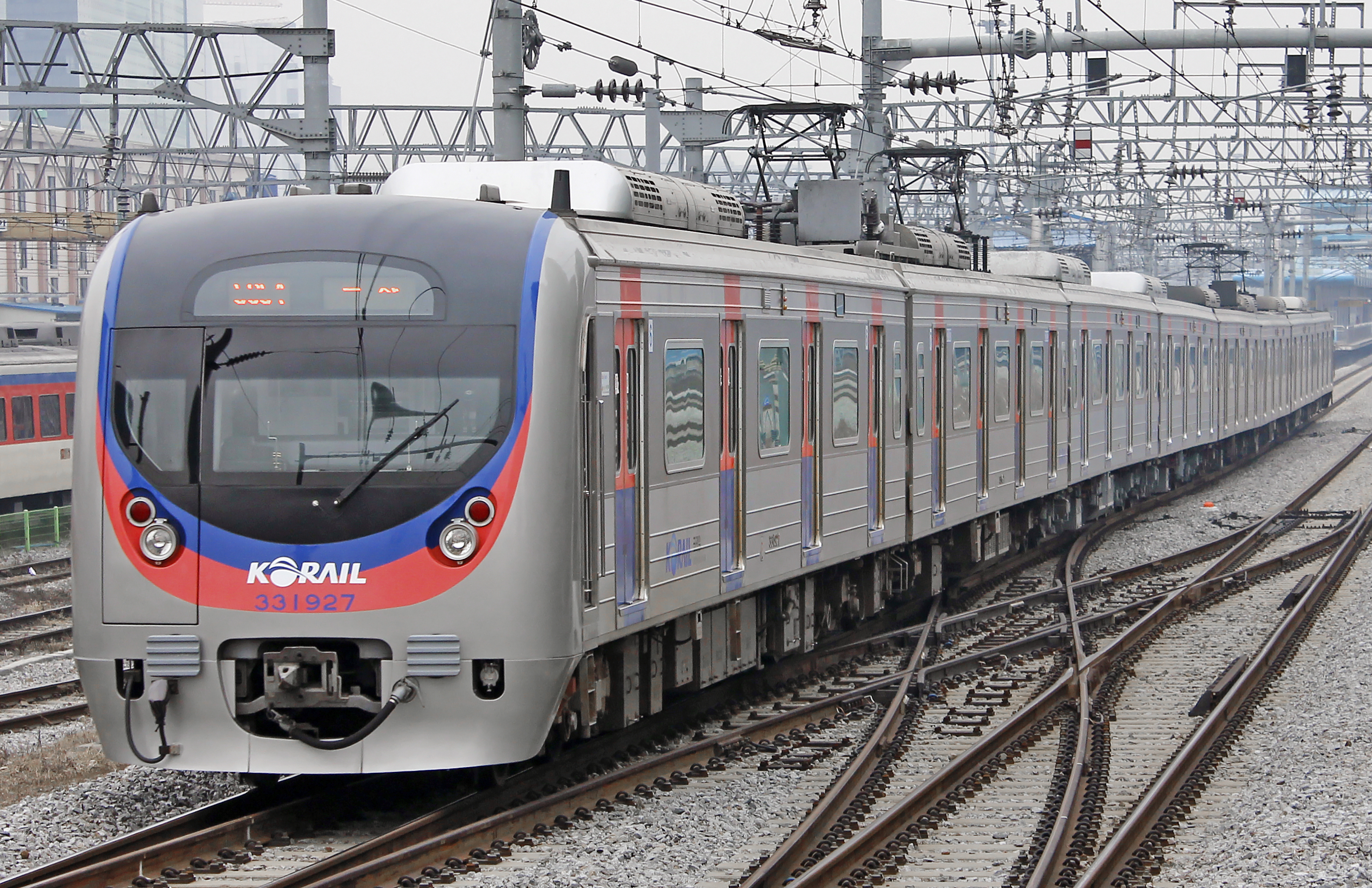
Class 331000 (second batch) train 331-27

The second batch of Class 331000 trains were introduced following the Gyeongui·Jungang Line's eastward extensions until Yongsan station, when the Gyeongui Line became the Gyeongui–Jungang Line.

The second batch trains are numbered 331-14~331-27. The trains have LCD monitor displays are installed on the top of each car. The trains also use the same front end design as the third batch Class 321000 trains, but the exterior body was reverted to the standard, ribbed type stainless steel body seen on all new cars.

Train 331-27 was manufactured and delivered in late 2012 to address the extension from Digital Media City station to Gongdeok station. It was originally six cars long, but was lengthened to eight cars in November 2014.

Trains 331-14~331-22 were manufactured and delivered in late 2013 to expand the rolling stock on the (at the time) Gyeongui Line. These trains are only four cars long and operate on the Seoul Station branch of the Gyeongui–Jungang Line.

Trains 331-23~331-26 were originally manufactured in 2012, but each train was extended to eight cars in 2014. They were delivered in late 2014 address the extension from Gongdeok station to Yongsan station.

=== 2nd generation ===
The second generation Class 331000s were manufactured by Hyundai Rotem in 2024, and they use the same design as the 4th and 5th generation Class 311000.

== Derived units ==
The Korail Class 361000 trains use the 1st batch body design.

== See also ==
- Korail
- Gyeongui–Jungang Line
