= Korail Class 361000 =

South Korean train

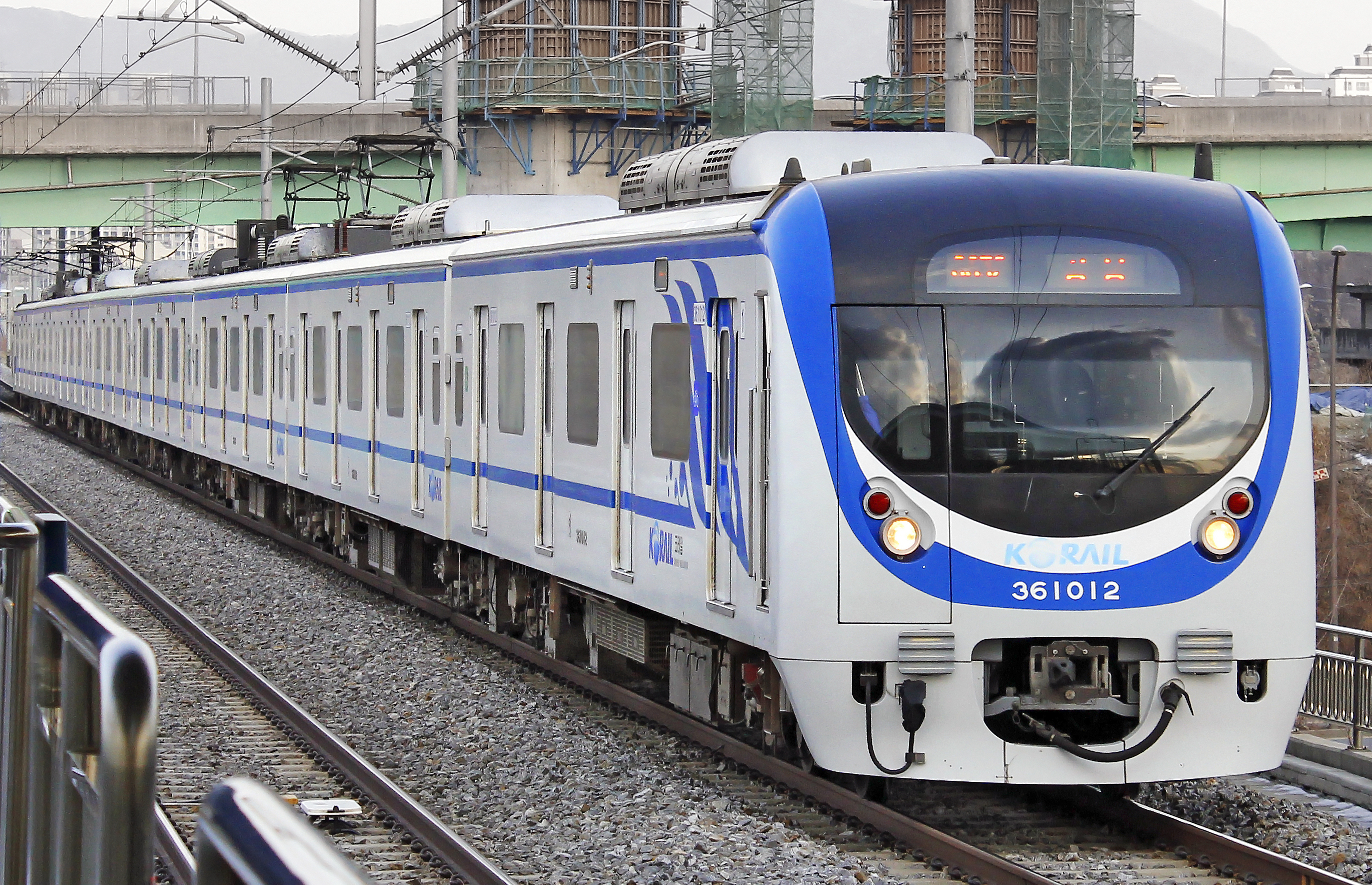
- Class 361000 trainset 361-12 at Byeollae station
- In service: 2010~present
- Manufacturer: Hyundai Rotem
- Constructed: 2010
- Formation: 8 cars per trainset TC-M-M'-T-T-M-M'-TC
- Operator: KORAIL
- Depot: Pyeongnae
- Line served: Gyeongchun Line

Specifications
- Car body construction: Aluminum
- Doors: 4 per side, 8 per car
- Maximum speed: 110 km/h (68 mph)
- Traction system: Toshiba COVO52-A0 VVVF-IGBT propulsion system using IGBT 1C4M motors
- Power output: 4,400 kW (5,900 hp)
- Acceleration: 3 km/(h⋅s) (1.9 mph/s)
- Deceleration: 3.5 km/(h⋅s) (2.2 mph/s) (service); 4.5 km/(h⋅s) (2.8 mph/s) (emergency)
- Electric system: 25 kV 60 Hz AC
- Current collection: Overhead
- Safety system: ATS
- Coupling system: Shibata-type
- Track gauge: 1,435 mm (4 ft 8 1/2 in)

The Korail Class 361000 trains are commuter electric multiple units in South Korea used on the Gyeongchun Line. Class 361000 trains were manufactured and delivered in 2010 to provide service on the Gyeongchun Line.

== Technical details ==
=== Electrical parts ===
All trains use IGBT controls and use passive cooling with a heat pipe. The trains are also equipped with regenerative braking, reducing energy consumption and simplifying train inspection, and they use electric door motors.

=== Interior design ===
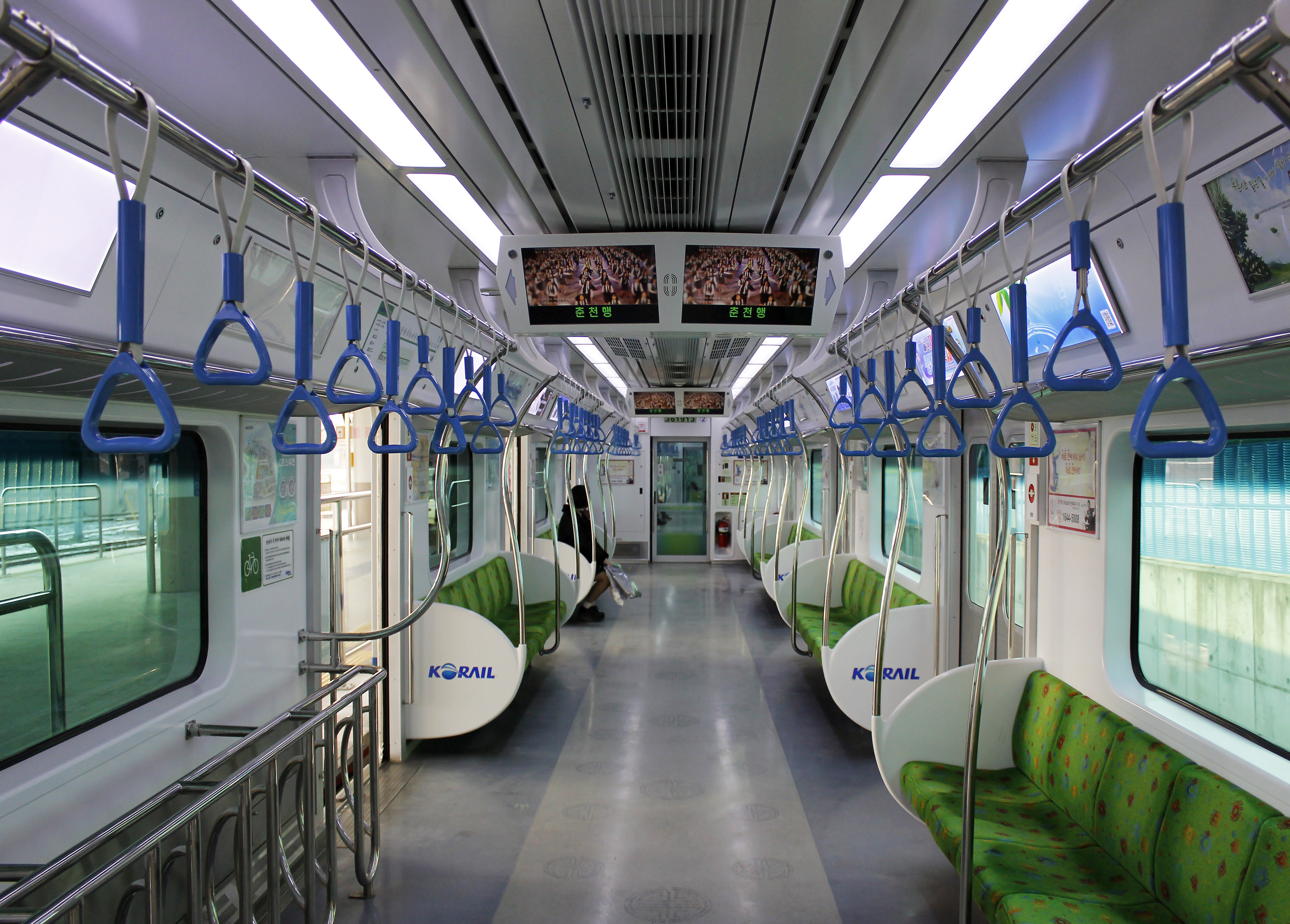
Class 361000 interior

The Class 361000 trains sport a white-colored interior. All trains have LCD monitor displays installed on the top of each car. The end cars have a space for wheelchairs.

=== Cabin ===
The Class 361000 trains share the same cabin design with the first batch Class 331000 trains, as they were derived from those trains. Stop notifiers are installed, as are TGIS use color displays. Dead section notifiers are also installed.

== Formation ==
The Class 361000 trains are organized in the following formation: TC-M-M'-T-T-M-M'-TC

The symbols are defined below.

- M' car: Pantograph, main transformer, controller, motor
- M car: Motor, controller
- TC car: Secondary power device, air compressor, battery, cabin
- T car: trailer (unpowered)

The cars of each trainset are numbered to correspond to the type of car each car is: 3610XX - Tc (SIV, air compressor, battery) 3611XX - M (inverter) 3612XX - M' (pantograph, transformer, inverter) 3613XX - T (trailer) 3614XX - T (trailer) 3615XX - M (inverter) 3616XX - M' (pantograph, transformer, inverter) 3619XX - Tc (SIV, air compressor, battery)

== Depot ==
The Class 361000 trains are stored at the Pyeongnae train depot, which is a few kilometers north of Pyeongnaehopyeong station.

== Trains ==
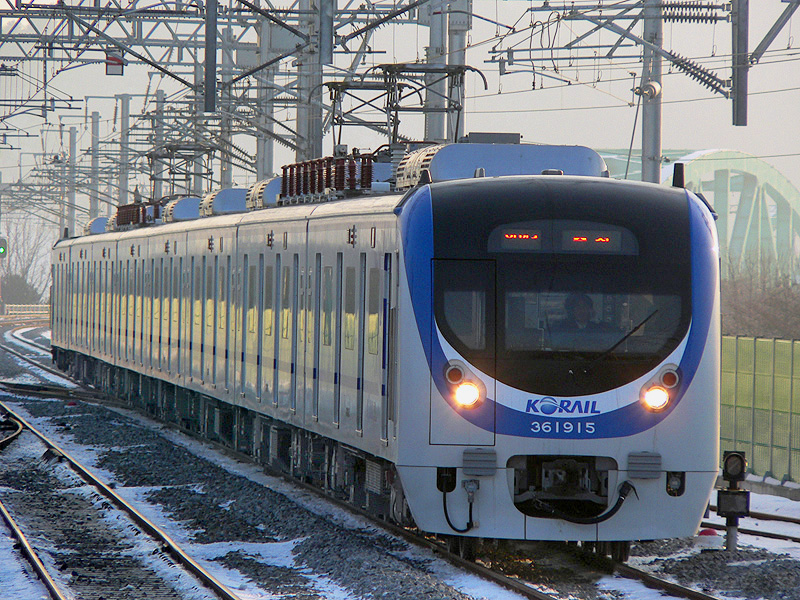
Class 361000 train 361-15, formerly converted to Class 311000 train 311-91 and eventually converted again to a new train 361-14.

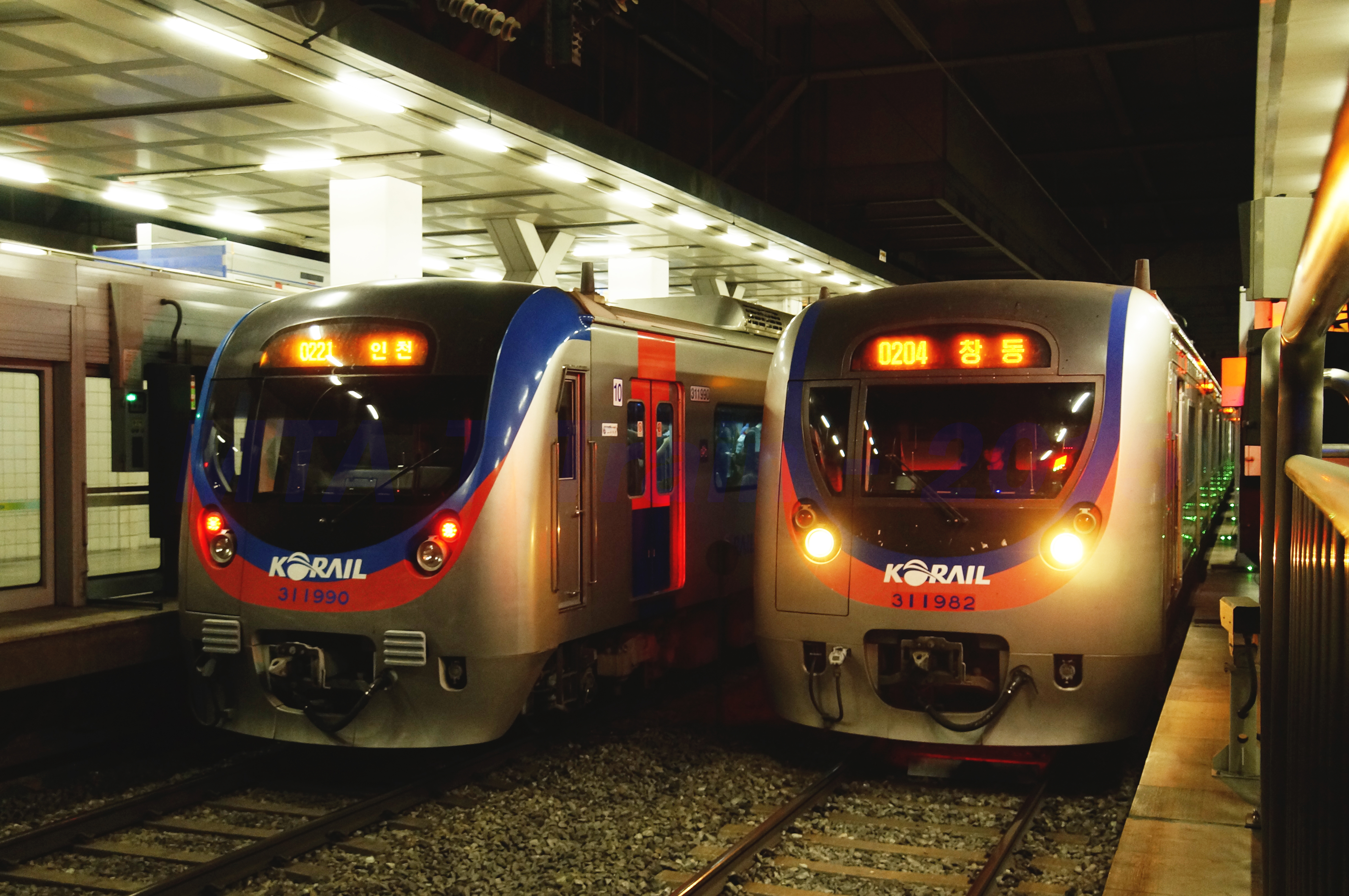
Former class 361000 train 361-14, now Class 311000 train 311-90.

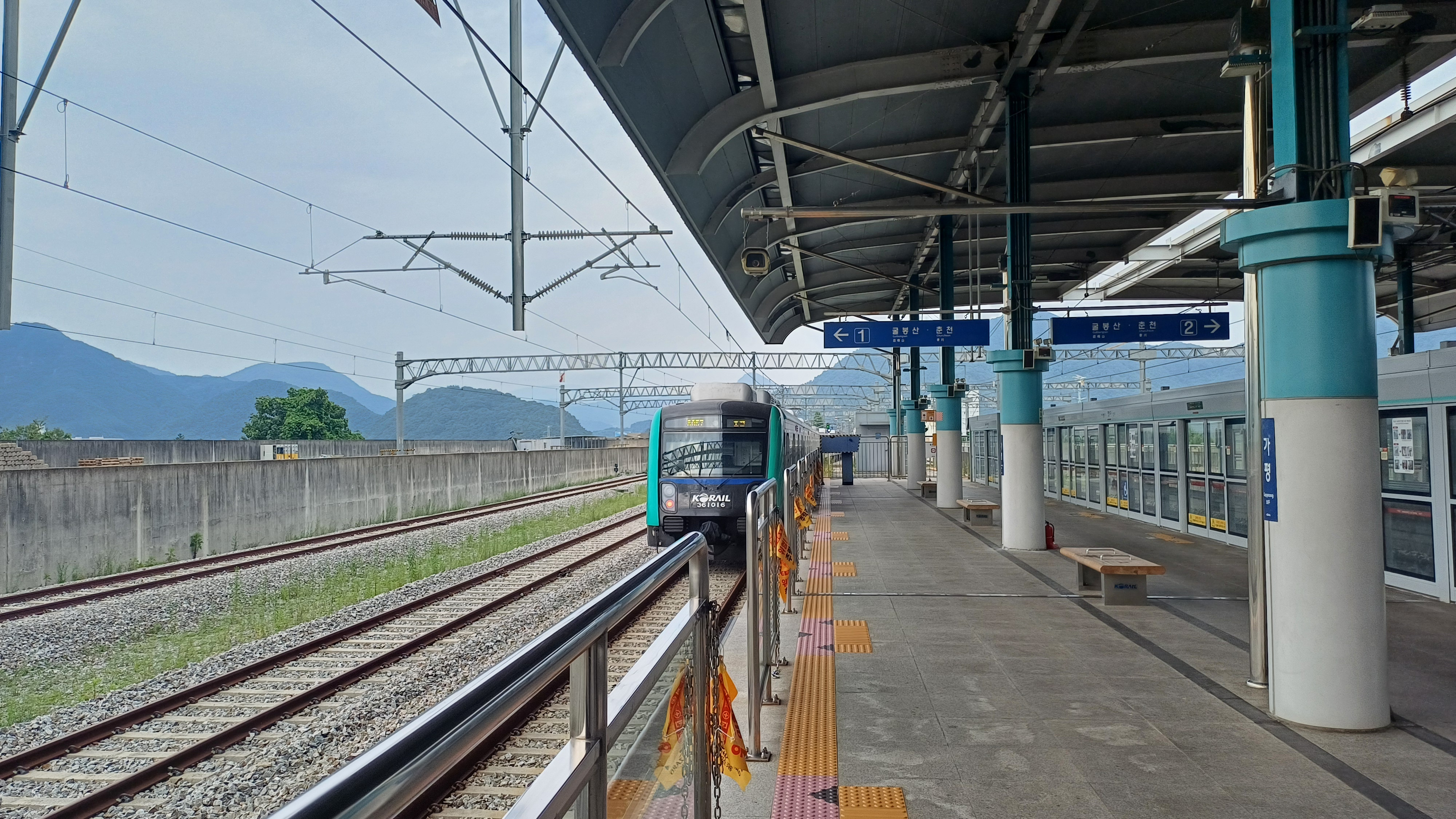
Class 361000 trainset 361-16 at Gapyeong station

The Class 361000 trains were originally numbered 361-01~361-15, but only 14 trains run in service on the Gyeongchun Line at this time. The trains have new, smoother exterior bodies like the first batch Class 331000 trains.

Trains 361-14~361-15 were introduced on the Gyeongchun Line in 2010 along with the other 13 trains, but when the Jungang Line's Class 321000 trains were shortened from 8 to six cars in October 2011, the trains were repainted and redeployed onto the Jungang Line in May 2012 until late 2013, when all the Class 321000 trains were extended back to eight cars. Starting in October 2014, however, the trains were taken to Hyundai-Rotem's Changwon factory to convert the two trains into Class 311000 trainsets 311-90~311-91, and had two newly made cars attached in the middle of the trains. In April 2017, train 361-15 was taken out of service from Line 1, and was transferred back to the Gyeongchun Line as train 361-14.

On 1 May 2025, 361-16, one of the 2 trains manufactured as the second generation Class 361000 (the other being 361-17), made its debut, running as a shuttle train between Sangbong and Maseok during peak hours.

== See also ==
- Korail
- Gyeongchun Line
