= Korail Class 341000 =

South Korean train

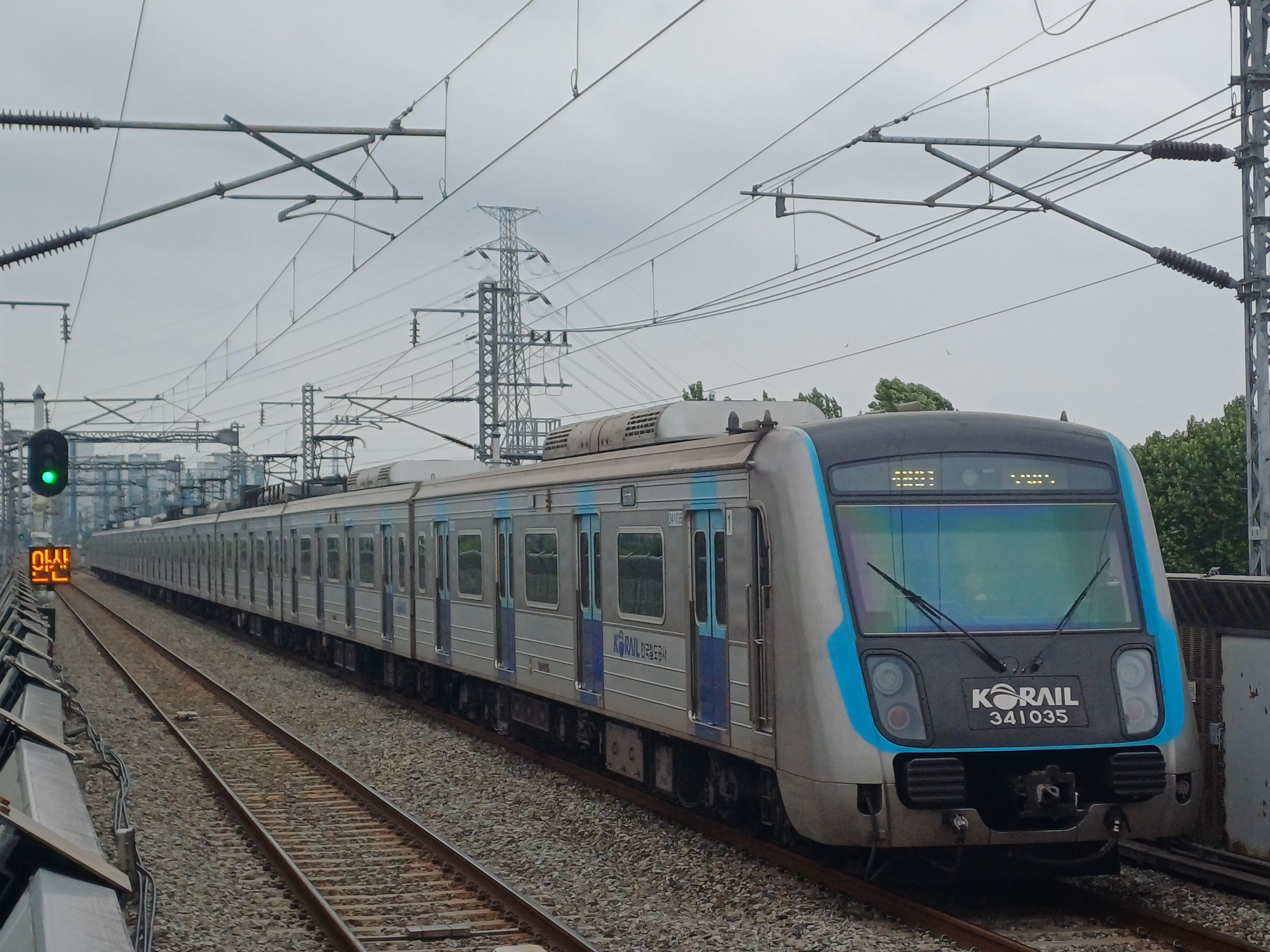
- 3rd generation train 341-36
- In service: 1993–present
- Manufacturers: Hyundai Rotem (formerly Daewoo Heavy Industries, Hyundai Precision & Industries, Hanjin Heavy Industries, and KOROS)
- Constructed: 1st generation: 1993–1994, 1996; 2nd generation: 1999; 3rd generation: 2019, 2021-2022, 2024
- Refurbished: 2003–2005 (1st and 2nd generation trains)
- Number built: 600: 1st generation: 250; 2nd generation: 50; 3rd generation: 300
- Number in service: 1st generation: 0; 2nd generation: 0; 3rd generation: 300
- Number scrapped: 300 (1st and 2nd generation trains)
- Formation: 10 cars per train TC-M-M'-T-M-T'-T-M-M'-TC
- Fleet numbers: 341x01~341x60
- Operator: Korail
- Depot: Siheung
- Lines served: Seoul Subway Line 4 Seoul Subway Line 1 (temporary, set 341-55 only)

Specifications
- Car body construction: Steel
- Car length: 19.6 m (64 ft 3 5/8 in)
- Width: 3.12 m (10 ft 2 13/16 in)
- Height: 3.8 m (12 ft 5 5/8 in)
- Doors: 4 per side, 8 per car
- Maximum speed: 110 km/h (68 mph) (under ATS); 110 km/h (68 mph) (under ATC)
- Power output: 4,400 kW (5,900 hp)
- Acceleration: 3.0 km/(h⋅s) (1.9 mph/s)
- Deceleration: 3.5 km/(h⋅s) (2.2 mph/s) (service); 4.5 km/(h⋅s) (2.8 mph/s) (emergency)
- Electric system: 25 kV 60 Hz AC/1.5 kV DC overhead catenary
- Current collection: Pantograph
- Braking system: Regenerative
- Safety systems: ATS, ATC
- Coupling system: Shibata-type
- Track gauge: 1,435 mm (4 ft 8 1/2 in)

The Korail Class 341000 trains, formerly identified as Korail Class 2000 trains, are commuter electric multiple units in South Korea used on Seoul Subway Line 4. Class 341000 trains were manufactured and delivered from 1993 to 1999 and 2019 to 2024 to expand service on the Gwacheon Line and the Ansan Line sections of Line 4.

== Technical details ==
=== Formation ===
The Class 341000 cars are arranged in 10-car trains. Details of the car types of each train are listed below:

3410XX (ex-20XX) - Tc (trailer driving car with SIV, air compressor, and battery)
3411XX (ex-22XX) - M (motor car with inverter and controller)
3412XX (ex-23XX) - M' (motor car with pantograph, transformer, inverter, and controller)
3413XX (ex-28XX) - T (trailer car)
3414XX (ex-24XX) - M'
3415XX (ex-25XX) - T' (trailer car with SIV, air compressor, and battery)
3416XX (ex-29XX) - T
3417XX (ex-26XX) - M
3418XX (ex-27XX) - M'
3419XX (ex-21XX) - Tc

=== Electrical parts ===
Trains 341x01~341x05, 341x08, 341x18~341x23, 341x25, and 341x26 use IGBT controls with passive cooling through a heat pipe, while all other trains use Toshiba GTO-based VVVF controls with active cooling. Power output on the Class 341000 trains is greater than that on the Class 1000 trains. As a result, the trains only utilize five powered cars, as opposed to six powered cars in older Korail metro trains. The trains are also equipped with regenerative braking, which reduces energy consumption and simplifies train inspection.

=== Interior design ===
The Class 341000 trains used an ivory-colored interior with a long sheet prior to their overhauls. All trains now use a white interior. LED display monitors are installed on the top of each car. The end cars have a space for wheelchairs.

=== Cabin ===
The Class 341000 trains equipped with TGIS use color displays, and service machines can be automatically controlled in TGIS after a refurbishment of these trains in 2005. Dead section notifiers are also installed.

== Depot ==
The Class 341000 trains are stored at the Siheung depot, which is located after Oido Station on Line 4.

== Generations ==
=== 1st Generation ===
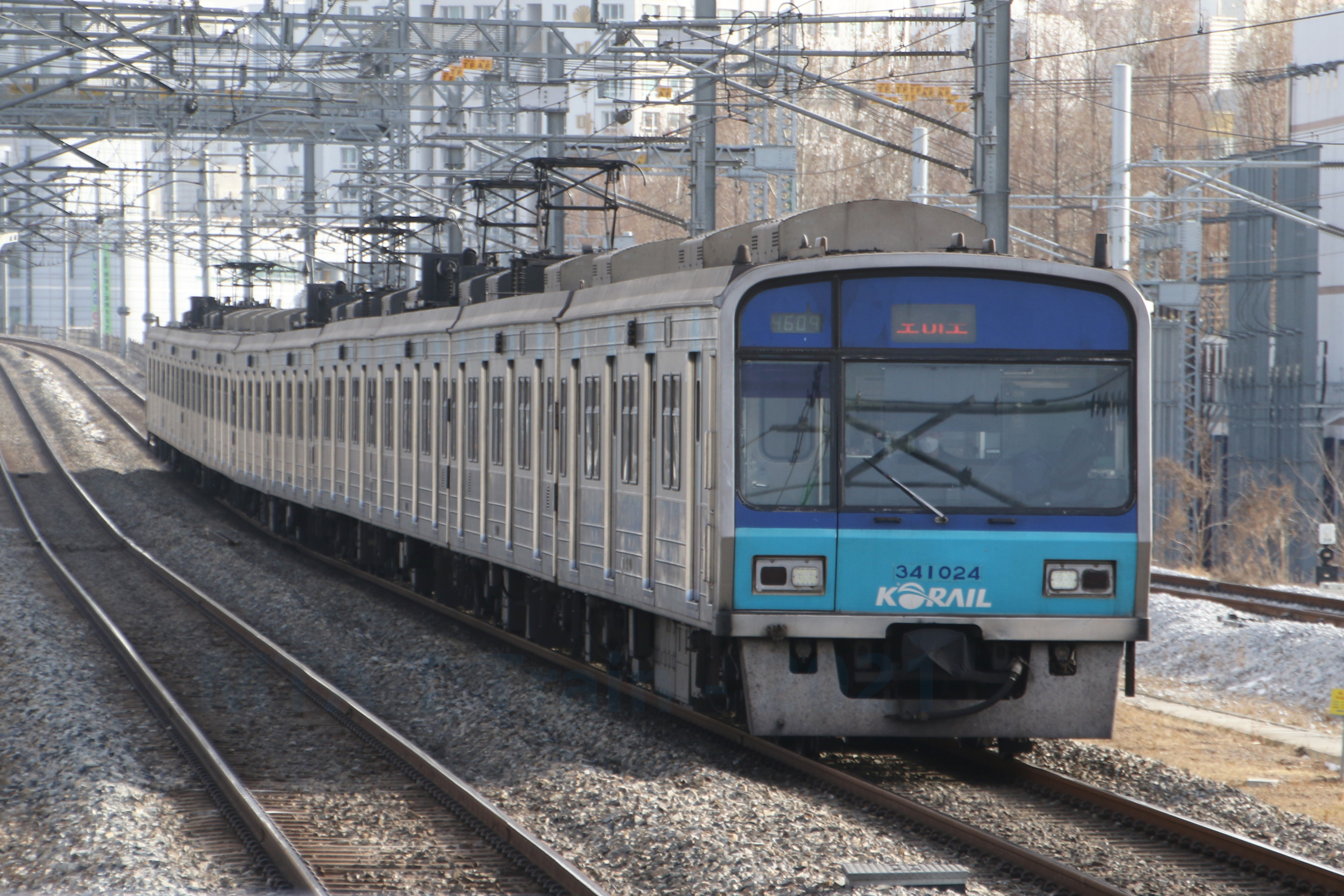
Class 341000 (1st batch) train 341x24 (ex-Class 2030 train 2-71)

The first generation of Class 341000 trains were built from 1993 to 1996. The trains used a livery consisting of red and orange stripes when delivered, but after refurbishment, the trains started using the new livery. Because of the flat front ends, the trains are nicknamed "flat face" (납작이).

The trains are numbered 341x01~341x25; the trains were renumbered from trains 2x30~2x46, 2x49, 2x51~2x54, 2x70~2x72.

Trains 341x01~341x22 were manufactured from 1993 to 1994 by Daewoo Heavy Industries, Hanjin Heavy Industries, and Hyundai Precision to address the opening of the Gwacheon Line and the Ansan Line (from Seonbawi Station to Ansan Station) and were originally six cars long. Additional cars were built in 1995 by Daewoo Heavy Industries to expand these trains to ten cars. Meanwhile, trains 341x23~341x25 were manufactured in 1996 by Daewoo Heavy Industries to expand the rolling stock on Line 4; they were built with 10 cars each.

All first generation trains were fully replaced by third generation Class 341000 trains by December 2023, though several have been prematurely retired, such as train 341-02, when it was retired in 2018 after it was cannibalized of cars for other metro trains, and many trains currently utilize cars from other Class 341000 trains or from older Class 311000 trains. Train 341-23 was retired on June 11, 2020 after suffering irreparable damage in an accident with another train at Sanggye station.

=== 2nd Generation ===
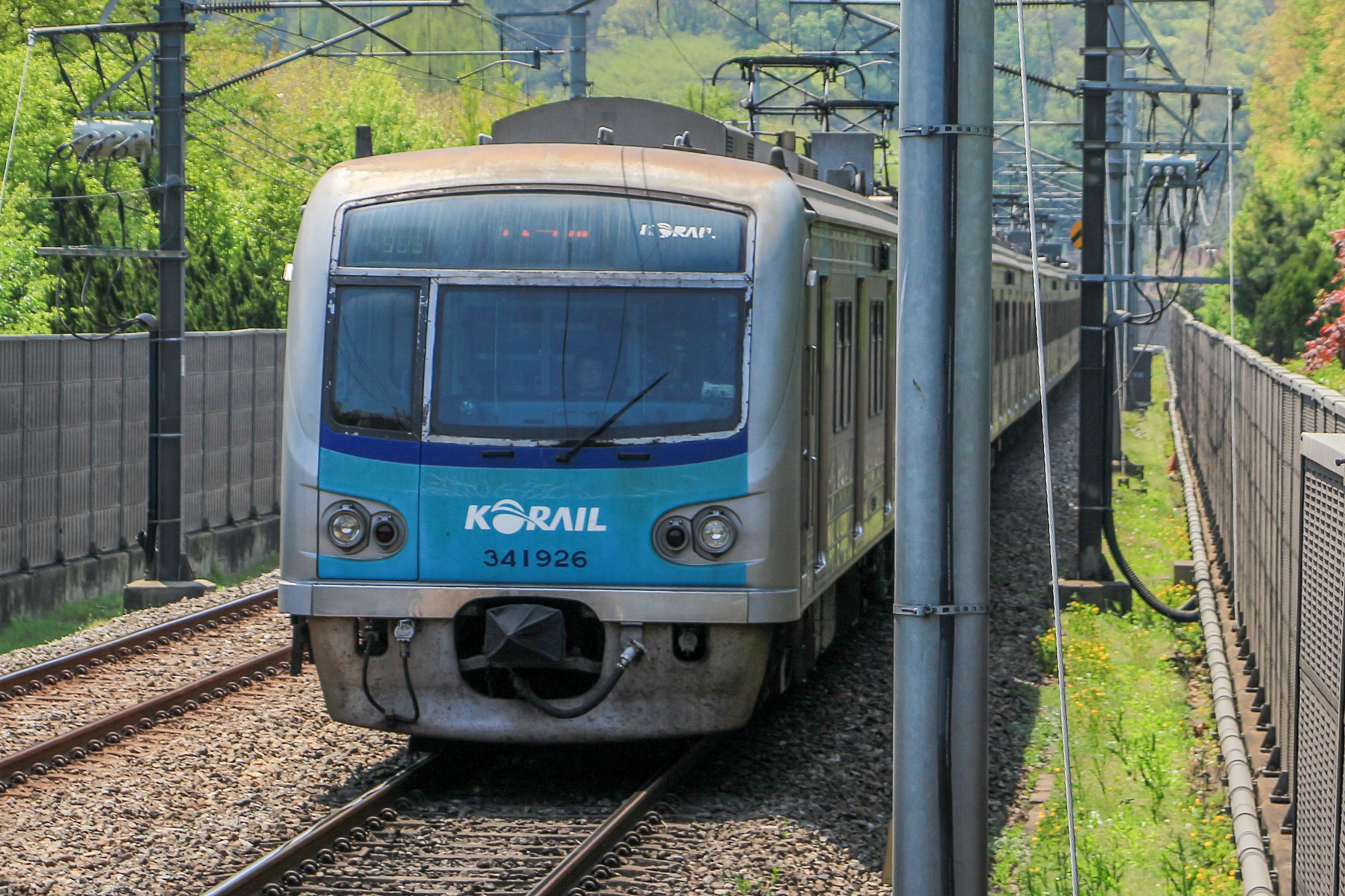
Class 341000 (2nd batch) train 341x26 (ex-Class 2030 train 2x77)

The second generation of Class 341000 trains were built in 1999 by KOROS (Korea Rolling Stock Company) to address the extension of the Ansan Line section of Line 4 from Ansan Station to Oido Station. The cab ends of the driving cars changed completely into a circular front view, which led to the trains being nicknamed "round face" (동글이). The trains used a livery consisting of red and orange stripes when delivered (similar to that of the first generation trains), but after refurbishment, the trains started using the new livery.

The trains are numbered 341x26~341x30; the trains were renumbered from trains 2x77~2x81.

All 2nd generation trains were retired by end-2024 and were replaced by new 3rd generation trains numbered 341x56~341x60.

=== 3rd Generation ===
The third generation of Class 341000 trains has built by Hyundai Rotem since 2018, to replace the aging first generation sets, which in recent years have been suffering from reliability issues. The trains sport some minor changes, such as the change in the propulsion system and a significant change in the design of the end cabs.

At this time, seven sets, numbered 341x31~341x37, have been delivered and entered service; however, all trains except sets 341x35 and 341x37 are temporarily assigned to Line 1 to serve as temporary replacements for aging third generation Class 1000 and first generation Class 311000 trains until Line 1 receives newer trains.

A further 18 sets, numbered 341x38~341x55, were delivered from 2021 to 2022. Until 2024, sets 341x41, 341x44~341x45, 341x48~341x55 temporarily operated in Line 1 due to the early retirement of the first-generation of Class 311000 trains. These sets are replacements for the aging first generation Class 341000 trains. These sets have a modified livery and interior design.

The final 5 sets, numbered 341x56~341x60, were delivered in 2024 to replace the second generation Class 341000 trains.

== Refurbishment ==
The first and second generation Class 341000 trains were overhauled from 2003 to 2005 (though minor refurbishments were started in 2002). Major and minor refurbishments are listed below.

=== Overhaul ===
The Daegu subway fire compelled Korail to introduce flame-resistant interiors for passenger safety. As a result, all trains were overhauled with fire-retardant interiors from 2003 to 2005.

=== New livery ===
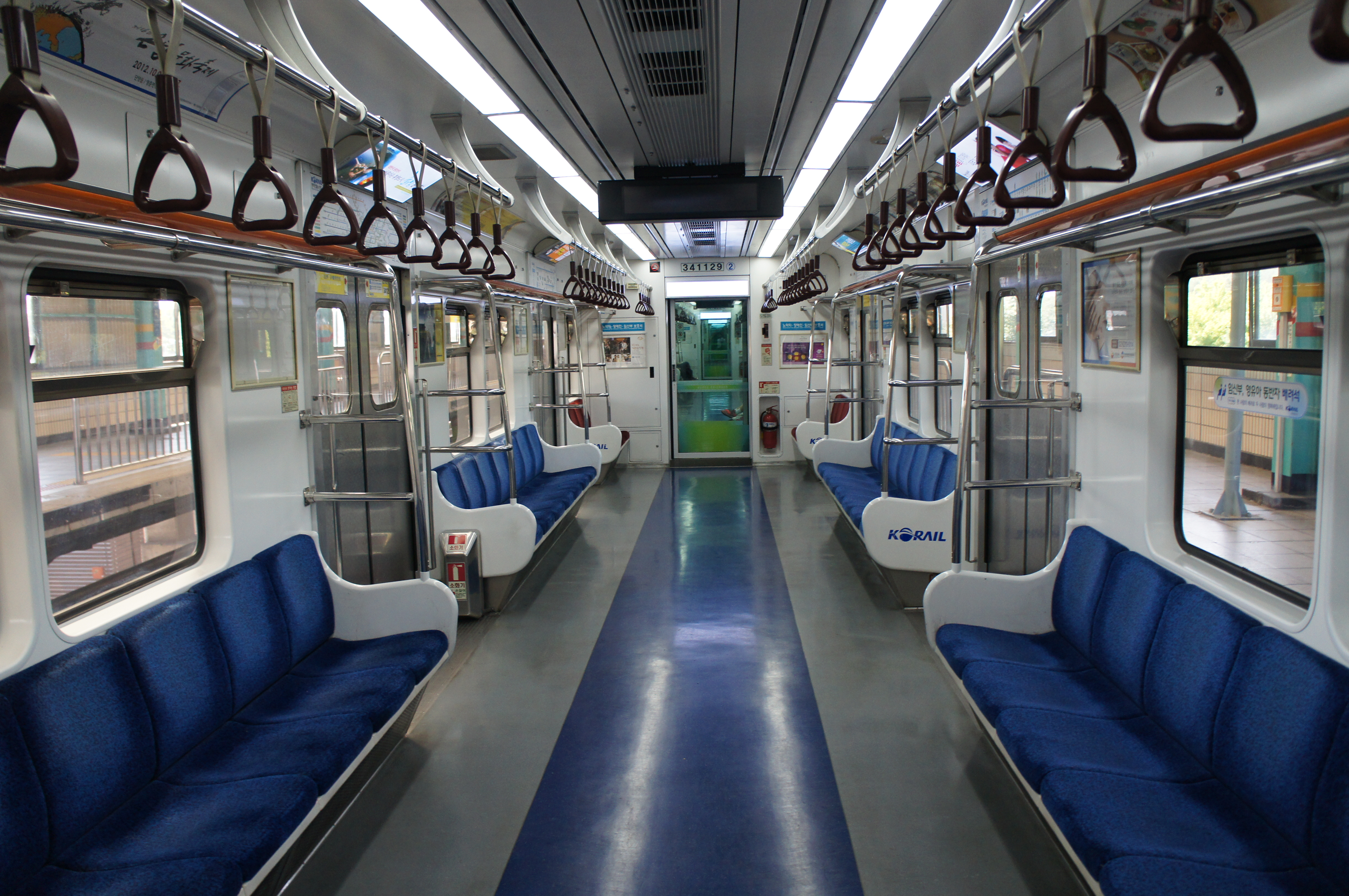
Refurbished interior of a second batch train

All trains used an old KNR livery consisting of red and orange stripes. These trains were repainted into the current blue and blue-green livery from 2003 to 2005. The new livery has a metaphor of Taegeuk, but was criticized as being too primitive-looking. Livery is applied only on front and on the doors.

=== Electric parts ===
- 2002: Trains 341x01~341x25 were retrofitted with Comonet broadcasting systems. They have since been removed.
- 2004: All trains' braking systems are refurbished to generate less noise.
- 2004-2005: SIV traction systems were replaced with IGBT traction systems built by Woojin Industrial Systems.
- 2005: Various new components in all trains (public address systems, newer cooling systems, and LED destination signs) are added.

From 2003, some trains had their GTO inverters replaced with IGBT inverters. As of 2018, trains 341x01~341x05, 341x08, 341x18~341x23, 341x25, and 341x26 have received new inverters.

From July 2008 all trains were retrofitted with automatic gangway doors (similar retrofits were also done in Class 311000, Class 321000, and Class 351000 trains). This retrofit included the installation of automatic doors to replace the older doors that were manually pulled open; gangway doors can now be automatically opened by the push of a button. This retrofit process was completed by February 2012.

Some trains are now being retrofitted with LED headlights, following the successful testing of LED headlights on the Korail Class 311000 cars.

=== Renumbering ===
In 2011, the Class 341000 trains were renumbered from the 2000-series to the 341000-series as a part of a new numbering scheme by Korail (the leading "3" indicating a metro car). Renumbering was finished by mid-2011.

== See also ==
- Korail
- Seoul Subway Line 4
- Korail Class 311000
- Korail Class 351000
