= Hmmsim Metro =

2021 video game

- Hmmsim Metro
- Developer: Jeminie Interactive
- Series: Hmmsim
- Engine: Unreal Engine 4
- Platform: Microsoft Windows
- Release: December 2021
- Genre: Simulation
- Mode: Single-player

Hmmsim Metro is a simulation game on the Seoul Subway Line 1. The game was released in Early Access in June 2021, and officially released in December 2021.

The game is not officially licensed by the operators of the line, and thus does not feature Seoul Subway branding.

== Gameplay ==
Hmmsim Metro is a simulation game that can be operated from Seoul Subway Line 1 to Kwangwoon University station and Geumcheon-gu Office Station. The trains that can be played are the 1st, 2nd, and 3rd generation trains of the Korail Class 311000.
