= Korail Class 311000 =

South Korean train

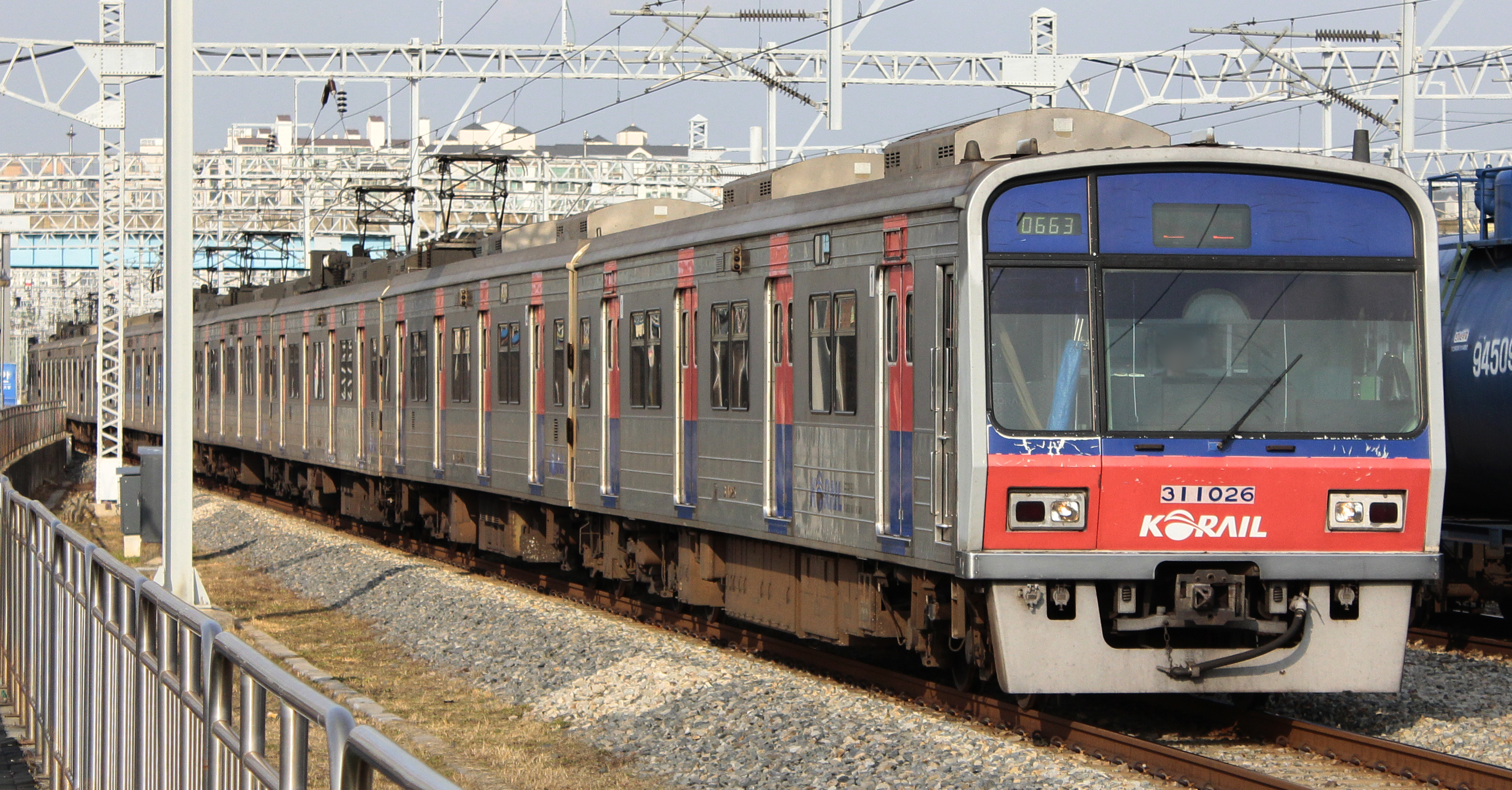
- Class 311000 (1st generation) train 311-26 (ex-Class 5000 train 5–27) at Cheonan station
- In service: 1996–present
- Manufacturers: Hyundai Rotem (previously Daewoo Heavy Industries, Hyundai Precision & Industries, Rotem)
- Constructed: 1st generation: 1996–1999; 2nd generation: 2002–2004; 3rd generation: 1st batch: 2005–2006; 2nd batch: 2010, 2012–2014 (Note: Eight cars from 311–90 were built as 361-15 in 2010); 3rd batch: 2015–2016; 4th generation: 2019–2022; 5th generation: 2023–present
- Refurbished: 2004–2006 Class 319000 & Class 321000: 2008 (trains 5–19, 5–79~5–80, & 5–86~5–92)
- Number built: 1125: 1st generation: 415; 2nd generation: 240; 3rd generation: 454; 4th generation: 120; 5th generation: 410
- Number in service: 1st generation: 6 (Note: Sets 311-24, 311-32, 311-35~311-38 only); 2nd generation: 240; 3rd generation: 452 (Note: 90 cars are now in service as trains 319-01~319-05 & 321-01~321-18) (Note: Cars 311491 & 311591 are now sidelined as the rest of train 311-91 was converted back to a Class 361000 train); 4th generation: 120; 5th generation: 360
- Number scrapped: 409 (1st generation trains)
- Formation: 10 cars per train TC-M-M'-T-M-T'-T-M-M'-TC
- Fleet numbers: Trains 311-01~312-00 (formerly trains 5-01~5–92)
- Operator: Korail
- Depots: Guro, Byeongjeom, Imun, Siheung
- Line served: Seoul Subway Line 1

Specifications
- Car body construction: Steel
- Car length: 19.6 m (64 ft 4 in)
- Width: 3.12 m (10 ft 3 in)
- Height: 3.8 m (12 ft 6 in)
- Doors: 4 per side, 8 per car
- Maximum speed: 110 km/h (68 mph)
- Power output: 4,400 kW (5,900 hp)
- Acceleration: 3.0 km/(h⋅s) (1.9 mph/s)
- Deceleration: 3.5 km/(h⋅s) (2.2 mph/s) (service); 4.5 km/(h⋅s) (2.8 mph/s) (emergency)
- Electric system: 25 kV 60 Hz AC/1.5 kV DC overhead catenary
- Current collection: Pantograph
- Braking system: Regenerative
- Safety systems: ATC, ATS
- Coupling system: Shibata-type
- Track gauge: 1,435 mm (4 ft 8 1/2 in)

The Korail Class 311000, formerly identified as Korail Class 5000 or Korail Class 6000, is a commuter electric multiple unit train type in South Korea used on Seoul Subway Line 1. Class 311000 trains were manufactured and delivered between 1996 and 2006, and again from 2012 to 2014 to expand service on the Gyeongbu Line and the Gyeongwon Line, and to replace older trains (1st and 2nd batch Class 1000 trains).

As numbering spots in the 311000 series run out, the newest Class 311000 trains have begun to sport numbers in the 312000 series.

== Technical details ==
=== Formation ===
The Class 311000 cars are arranged in 10-car trains.

T represents a trailer car, and M represents a car equipped with a motor. c represents a car with a cab end, and a prime symbol (') represents a car with either a pantograph or an air compressor.

Details of the train formation are listed below:

Car No.	1	2	3	4	5	6	7	8	9	10
Designation	Tc	M	M'	T	M'	T'	T	M	M'	Tc
Numbering	3110xx	3111xx	3112xx	3113xx	3114xx	3115xx	3116xx	3117xx	3118xx	3119xx

=== Electrical parts ===
Out of the trains in service, 311-24, 311-25, 311-32, 311-50 and 311-53 use Toshiba GTO-based VVVF controls with active cooling, while all other trains use IGBT controls with passive cooling through heat piping.

Power output on the Class 311000 trains is greater than that on the Class 1000 trains. As a result, the trains only utilize five powered cars, as opposed to six powered cars in the Class 1000 trains. The trains are also equipped with regenerative braking, which reduces energy consumption and simplifies train inspection. The trains feature a more powerful air conditioning system than that on the Class 1000 trains.

=== Interior design ===
Older Class 311000 trains used an ivory-colored interior with a long sheet prior to their overhauls; all trains now use a white interior. LED panels are installed on the top of each car older than train 311-83 that show announcements; trains 311-83 and beyond have LCD monitor displays that show advertisements along announcements. The end cars have a space for wheelchairs.

=== Cabin ===
Older Class 311000 trains share the same cabin design with the Class 341000 and Class 351000 trains (formerly Class 2030), which entered service four years prior. Newer 311000s have identical cabins to 321/331/351/361/371/381/391000 series cabins. The trains feature ATC devices and stop notifiers for express services. Trains equipped with TGIS use color displays, and service machines can be automatically controlled in TGIS after a refurbishment of the trains in 2005. Dead section notifiers are also installed.

=== Livery ===
All first generation trains and some second generation trains used an old KNR green (and yellow for the 1st generation trains) livery that ran the whole length of the cars. The trains with the old KNR green and yellow livery were repainted into a blue and red livery in 2006. Unlike the older livery, the livery was applied only on the front ends, the doors, and on parts of the car bodies above and below the doors; it is intended to be a metaphor of Taegeuk, but was criticized as being too primitive-looking. All third generation trains and some fourth generation trains were delivered in this livery.

Later fourth generation trains sport an updated version of the Taeguk-themed livery. The updated livery is only applied on the front ends and the doors, and comprises a blue background with a small red stripe.

== Depot ==
The Class 311000 trains are stored at the Guro, Byeongjeom and Imun train depots. Minor inspections are done at their home depots, while major inspections are conducted at the Siheung depot, which is located after Oido Station on Line 4.

- Imun: 311-03~311-25, 311–81~311–82
- Guro: 311-26~311-41, 311–48~311–53, 311–66~311–76, 311–83~311–90, 311–92~312–07
- Byeongjeom: 311-42~311-47, 311–54~311–65, 311–77~311–80

== Generations ==
=== 1st generation ===
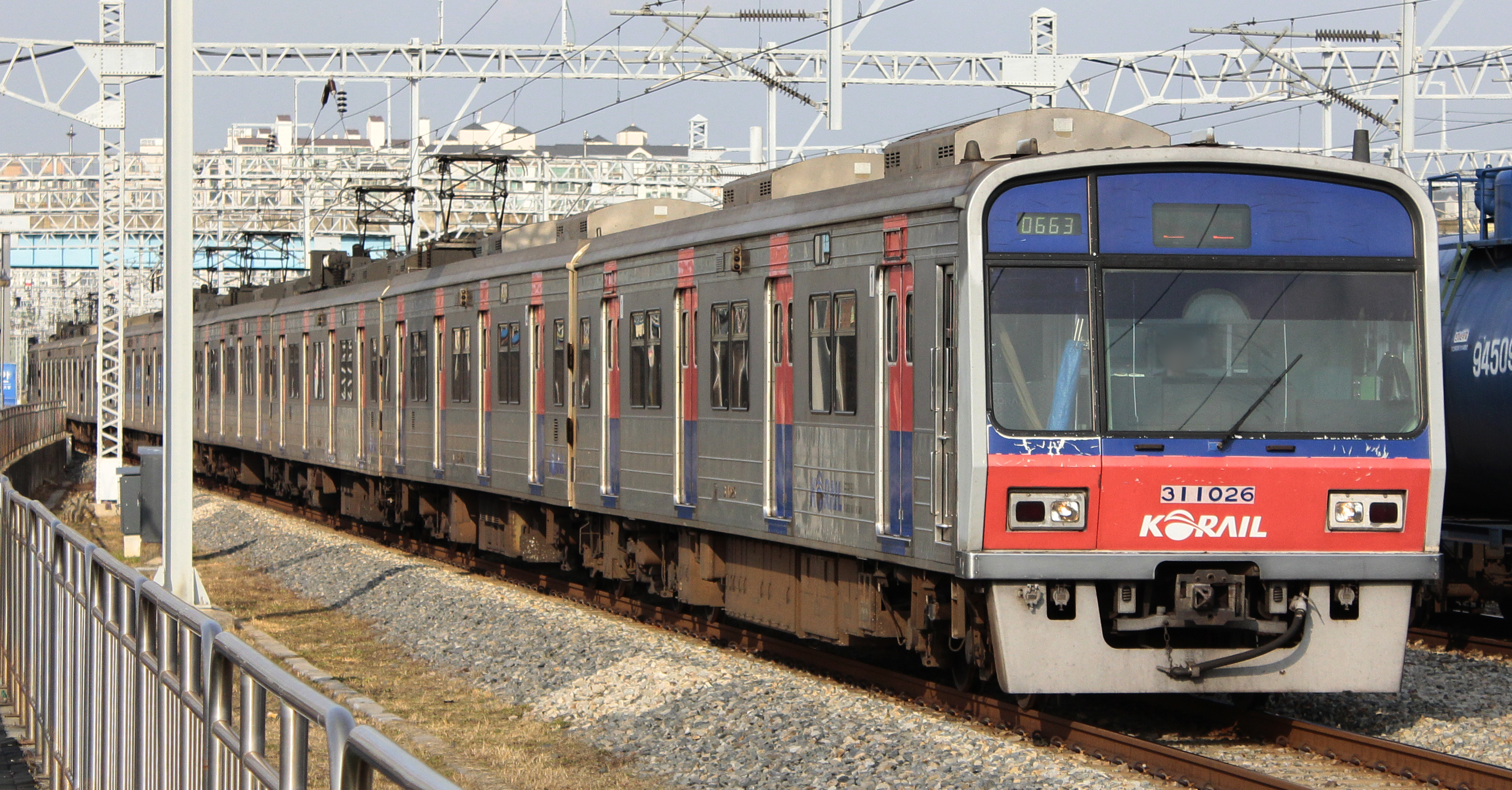
Class 311000 (1st generation) train 311-26 (ex-Class 5000 train 5–27)

The first generation of Class 311000 trains are nearly identical to the first generation Class 341000 and 351000 cars, on which they were based. The first generation trains were built from 1996 to 1999. Because of the flat front ends on these trains, railfans nicknamed the trains "flat face" (납작이).

The current trains are numbered 311-01~311-41, but there was one more train prior to 2008, and all were numbered in the 5000-series (trains 5-01~5–42) when delivered. The additional train, train 5–19, was involved in an accident that wrecked cars 5719 and 5119; the remaining eight cars were converted to and reconfigured as Class 319000 trains 319-06~319-07. Meanwhile, trains 5-01~5~18 were renumbered to 311–01~311–18, and trains 5–20~5–42 into 311-19~311-41, since they were not converted.

Trains 311-01~311-27 and former train 5–19 were built by Hyundai Precision & Industries from 1996 to 1997 to expand service on Line 1. Trains 311-28~311-41 were built by Daewoo Heavy Industries from 1998 to 1999, mainly to replace the 1st batch Class 1000 trains, which were starting to approach the end of their 25-year lifespans.

Trains 311-28~311-41 include cars with wheelchair space. Trains 311-39 (one car only), 311–40, and 311-41 used converted 2nd generation Class 1000 non-driving unpowered cars (from former 1st generation sets 1–39~1–41) from the time they were manufactured to 2019. Train 311-40 now uses two Class 311000 non-driving unpowered cars, train 311-41 uses two Class 341000 non-driving unpowered cars, and train 311-39 uses one Class 341000 non-driving unpowered car.

Train 311-02 was damaged in a derailment north of Noryangjin on May 9, 2016. Train 311-01 was taken out of service for unknown reasons in mid-2017. The eight non-driving cars of train 311-01 were utilized on Class 341000 train 341–04. Meanwhile, several powered cars from train 311-02 were utilized on other Class 341000 trains, and the two unpowered non-driving cars were used to replace the original Class 1000 unpowered cars in train 311–40.

All 1st generation trains (including Class 319000 trains 319-06~319-07 trains) were retired by 2024, except six trains which had their lifespan extended until 2027–2028.

=== 2nd generation ===
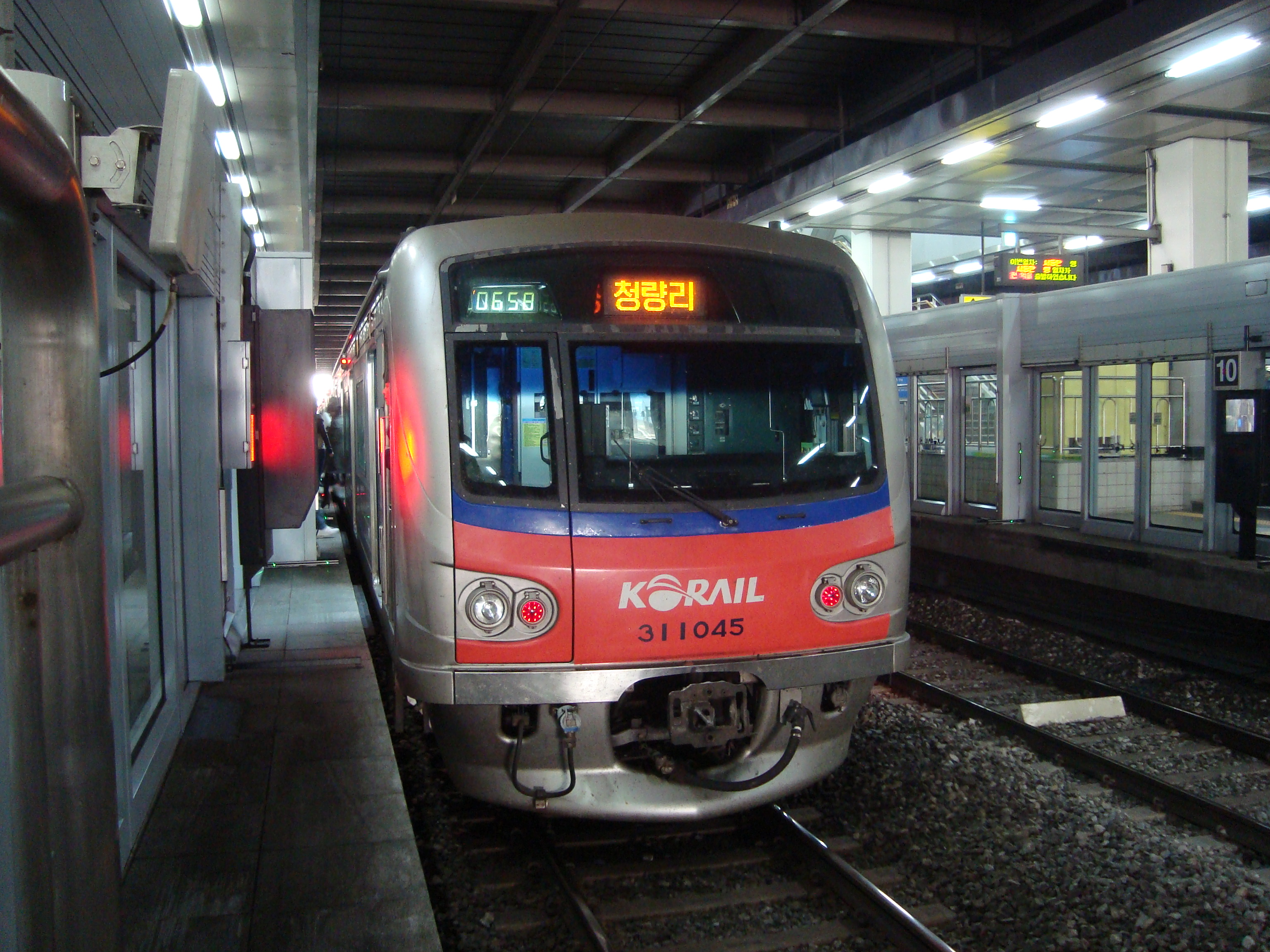
Class 311000 (2nd generation) train 311-45 (ex-Class 5000 train 5–46)

The second generation of Class 311000 trains are very identical to the second generation Class 341000 cars. The car body as a whole was redesigned; the front ends of the train were changed completely, and the side windows are now coated and in a single piece (as opposed to the two-window setup between doors). Because of the circular front ends on these trains, railfans nicknamed the trains "round face" (동글이). The second generation trains are numbered 311-42~311-65.

Trains 311-42~311-47 were built by Rotem from 2002 to 2003 to address the Line 1 Gyeongbu Branch's extension from Suwon to Byeongjeom Station. They also retired more 1st batch Class 1000 trains.

Trains 311-64 & 311-65 were built by Rotem in 2004 to address the Line 1 Gyeongbu Branch's extension from Byeongjeom to Cheonan Station. They use somewhat smaller bogies, and are the first to use fire-resistant interiors, LED destination signs, and LED train number indicators since their delivery.

The trainset is nearly identical to the LRTA 2000 class used by the Light Rail Transit Authority in Manila's Line 2 which in turn the design of the said rolling stock were based on this generation. The said trainsets were also manufactured by Hyundai Rotem along with Toshiba for its original propulsion systems.

Second generation trains are expected to fully retire by 2027 or 2029 when it reaches the end of its planned lifespan of 25 years.

=== 3rd generation ===
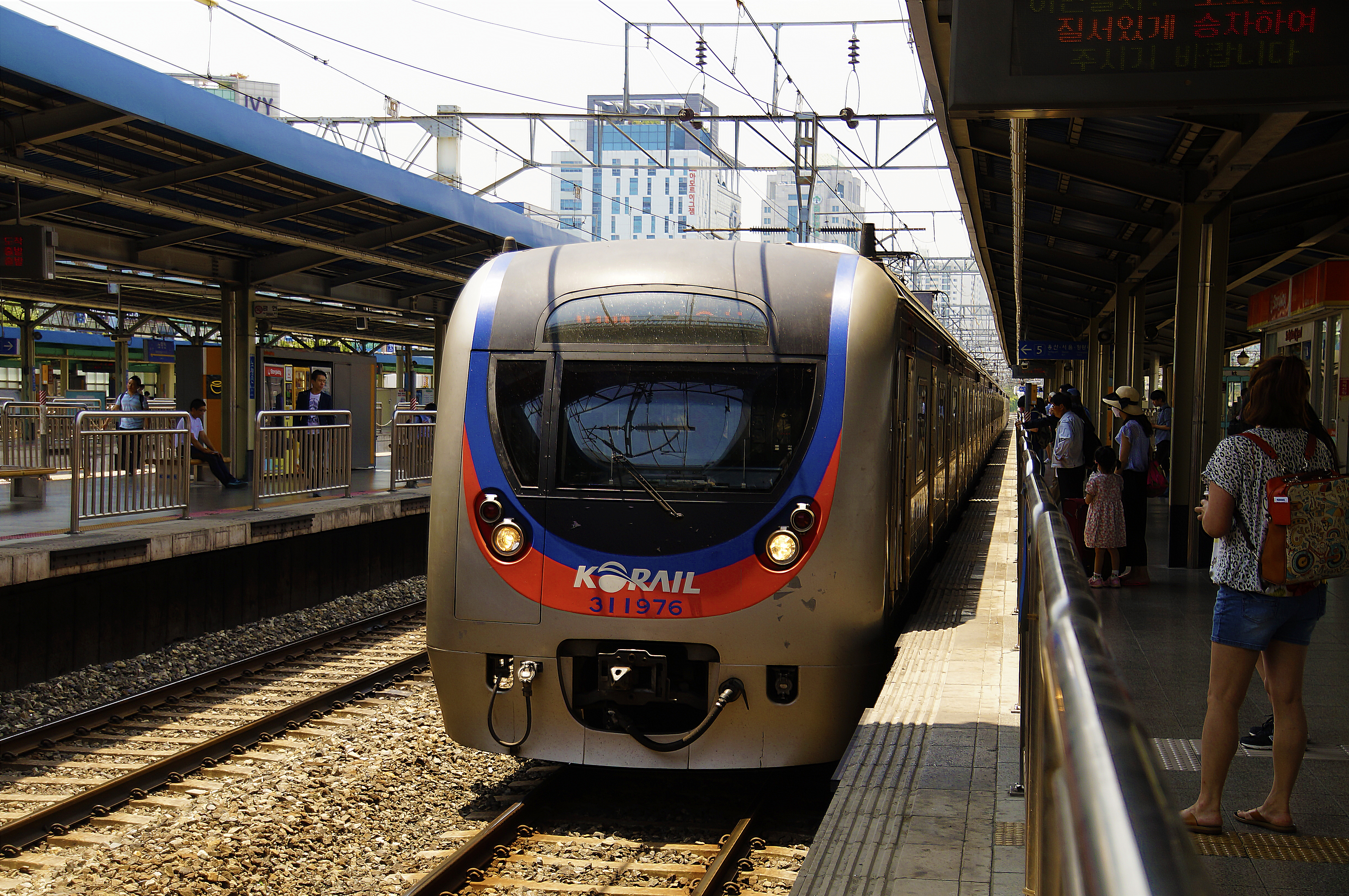
Class 311000 trains 311-76

The third-generation were built and delivered from 2005 to 2006 mainly to address new extensions that opened at the time, especially on the 4-track Gyeongin Line, the Gyeongwon Line, and the new double-tracked and electrified Jungang Line. They also replaced the rebuilt 1st/2nd batch Class 1000 trains (trains 1–82 and 1–88~1–94) and four un-overhauled 2nd batch Class 1000 trains, which were all retired in 2006 as they either reached the end of their lifespans or did not conform to fire safety standards. The front ends have been updated once again, and the trains feature snake-like headlights; as a result, railfans nicknamed the trains "뱀눈이" (roughly translated as "snake eyes") . The interior was also updated and the door motors are electric-powered as opposed to air-powered. The third generation trains are numbered from 311 to 66~312–03, but more trains will be built in the future.

The current trains are numbered 311-66~311-82, but there were more trains prior to 2008, and all were numbered in the 5000-series (trains 5–66~5–92) when delivered. Trains 5–79~5–80, and 5–86~5–92 were converted to Class 319000 trains 319-01~319-05 and Class 321000 trains 321-01~321-07 and parts of 321–15~321–18. Meanwhile, trains 5–67~5~78 were renumbered to 311–66~311–77, and trains 5–81~5–85 into 311-78~311-82, since they were not converted.

Trains 311-66~311-77 were originally intended to be built in Rotem's Uiwang factory, but the factory was later closed due to financial problems with Rotem at the time. Trains 311-78~311-82 feature a slightly different interior and ventilation system, and are capable of one-person train operation (OPTO). Car 311580 in trains 311-80 was retrofitted as a "365" business transactions car from 2010 until the end of 2013.

The next batch of the third generation Class 311000 trains were built from 2012 to 2014. They replaced refurbished 2nd batch Class 1000 trains that reached the end of their 25-year lifespans. The front end received anticlimbers, and several improvements were made to the interior including new overhead LCD destination displays and clearer speakers.

The trains are numbered 311-83~311-94. The trains are the first to be delivered new under the 311000-series numbering. Trains 311-83~311-87 used converted Class 321000 cars when delivered in August 2012, but due to complaints from Jungang Line passengers about shortened trains on the line, the trains were taken out of service in late 2013, reconfigured with newly made cars in 2014, and redeployed in August 2014. Trains 311-92~311-94 are the first trains to have been delivered new with LED headlights. Meanwhile, trains 311-88~311-89 were sidelined for years until receiving newly made cars in 2014.

Train 311-90 was originally 8-car Class 361000 train 361–14, which was last used on the Jungang Line to make up for the shortened trains on the line. Following the lengthening of the Jungang Line's trains back to eight cars, the two trains were taken out of service, lengthened to 10 cars with two newly built cars, and redeployed on Line 1 in December 2014. Train 311-91 was originally 8-car Class 361000 train 361–15, which was also last used on the Jungang Line to make up for the shortened trains on the line. However, unlike train 311–90, this train was taken out of service in April 2017, and converted back to a Class 361000 train, but is expected to be converted to train 311–91 by 2020. As a result, the two newly built cars in train 311-91 have been stored out of service for the time being.

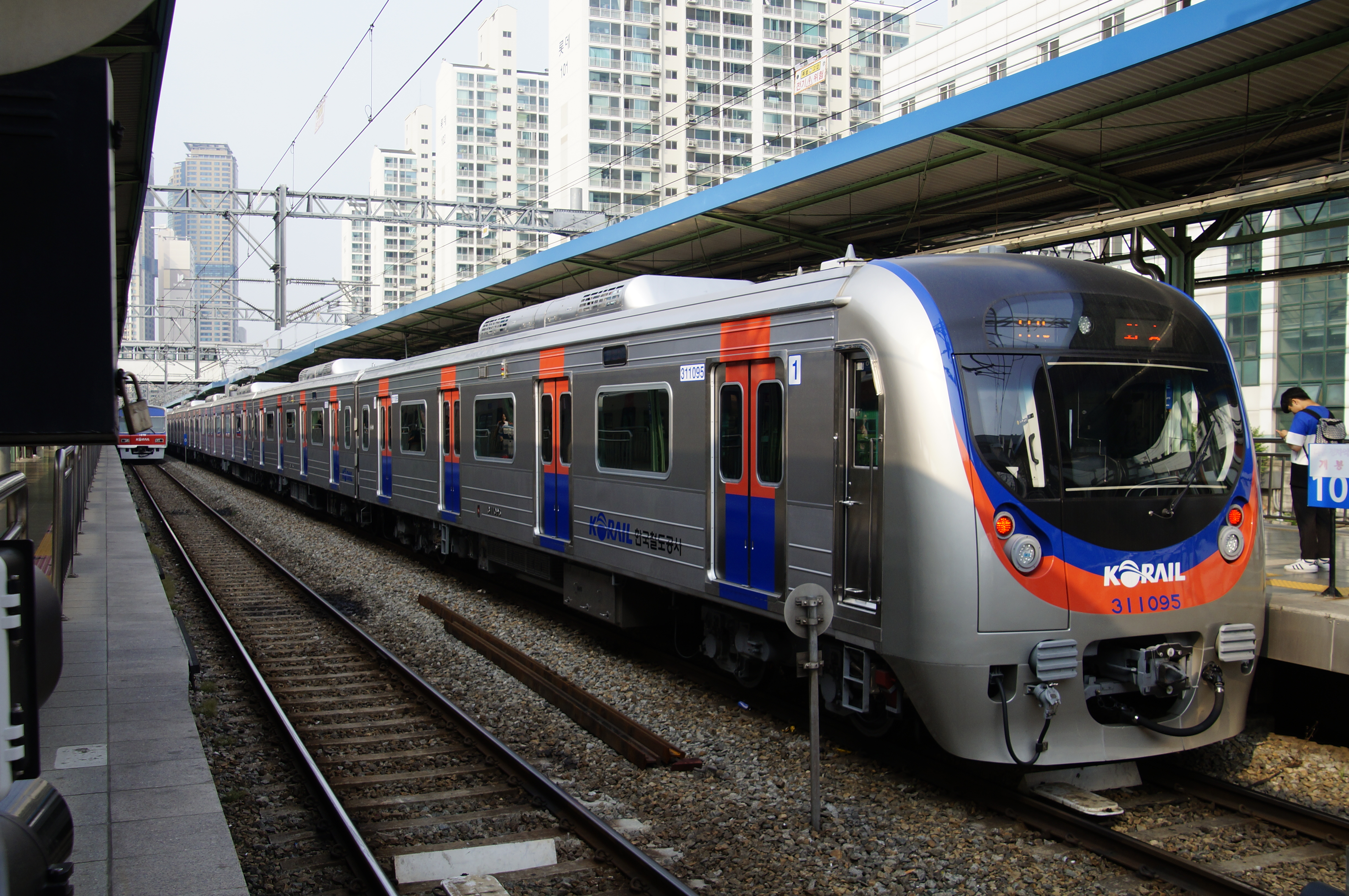
Class 311000 train 311-95

The last batch of third generation Class 311000 trains were built and delivered throughout 2016. They replaced the remaining 2nd batch Class 1000 trains. The fourth generation trains sport some minor changes, such as single-arm pantographs (similar to those used on ITX-Saemaul trains and KTX trains), CCTV cameras, and a third headlight in the same compartment as the destination sign and the run number indicator; as a result, railfans nicknamed the trains "삼눈이" (roughly translated as "three eyes"). They share the same design as the Class 371000 trains, first generation Class 381000 trains, Class 391000 trains, and Class 351000 trains 351-73~351-78. These trains are numbered 311-95~312-03.

=== 4th generation ===
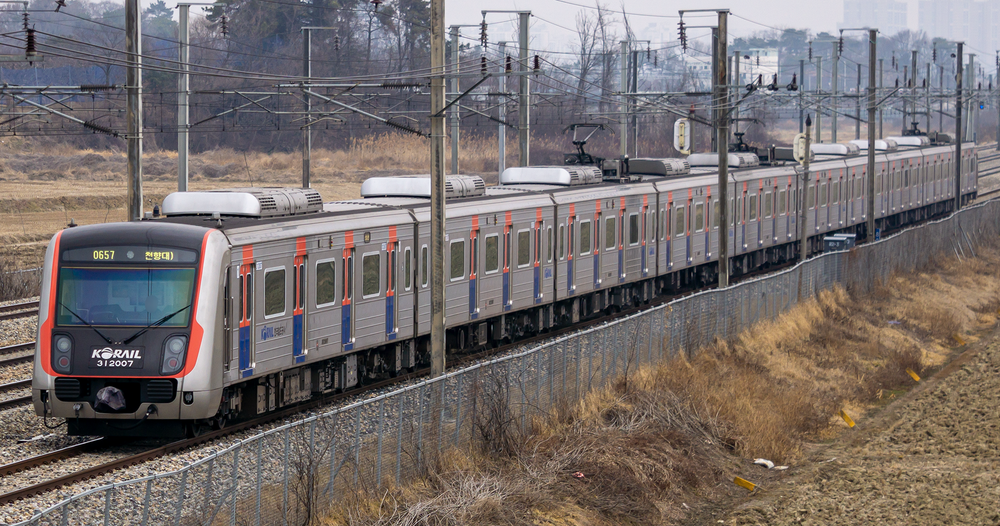
Class 312000 (4th generation)

The fourth generation Class 311000 trains are being built and have been delivered since 2019, along with the third generation Class 341000 trains. They replaced the third generation Class 1000 trains. The fifth generation trains sport some minor changes, such as the change in the propulsion system (from an IGBT-based system to an interior permanent magnet-base system). The cab ends of the driving cars changed completely; as a result, railfans nicknamed the trains "주둥이" (roughly translated as "snout face"). The fifth generation trains are numbered from 312 to 04, and are currently being delivered at this time.

Four trains, being the first batch, numbered 312-04~312-07, were delivered and entered service in 2019. A further eight trains, numbered 312-08~312-15, have been delivered and entered service since January 2022. These trains have a modified livery and interior.

=== 5th generation ===
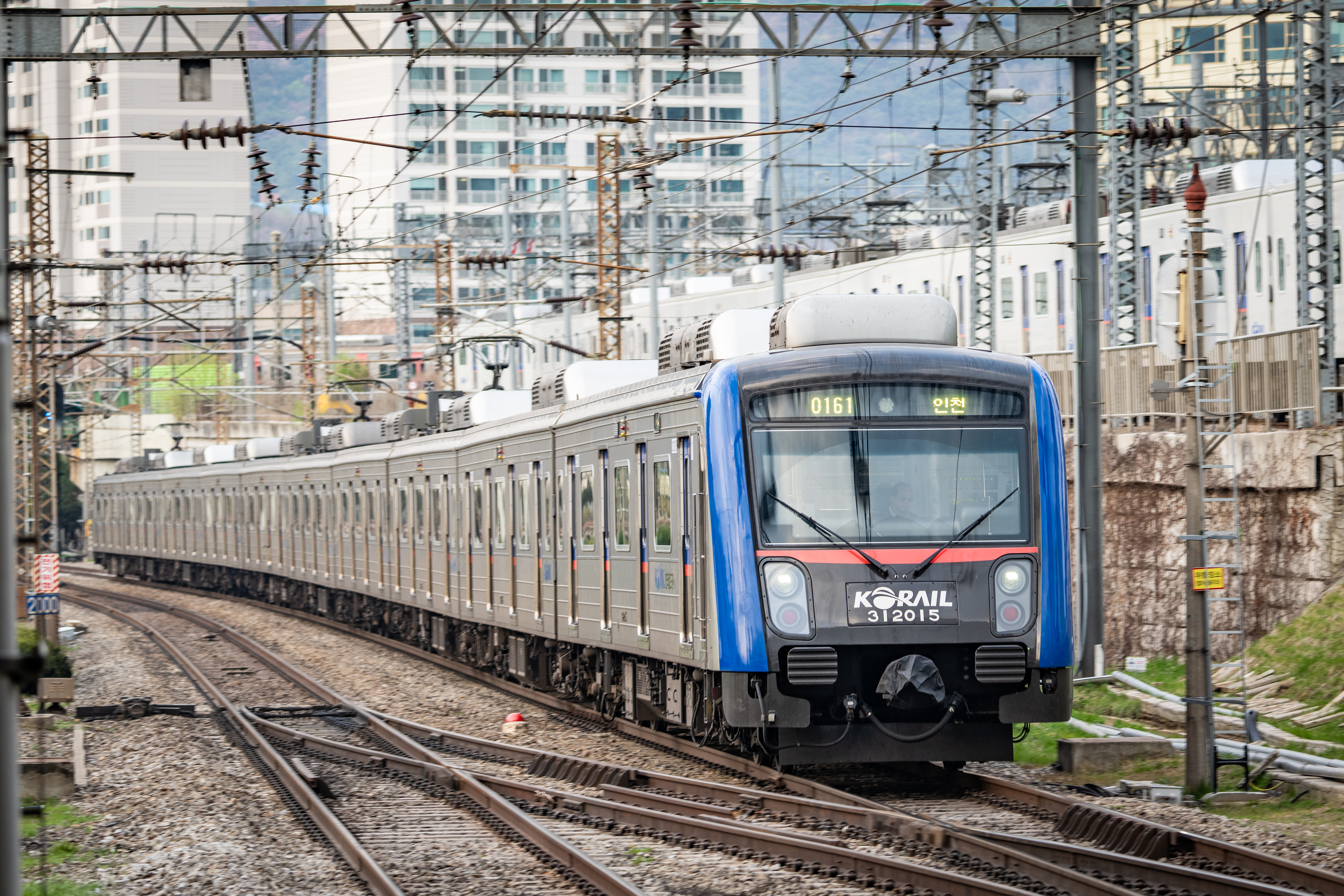
Class 312000 (5th generation)

=== 6th generation ===
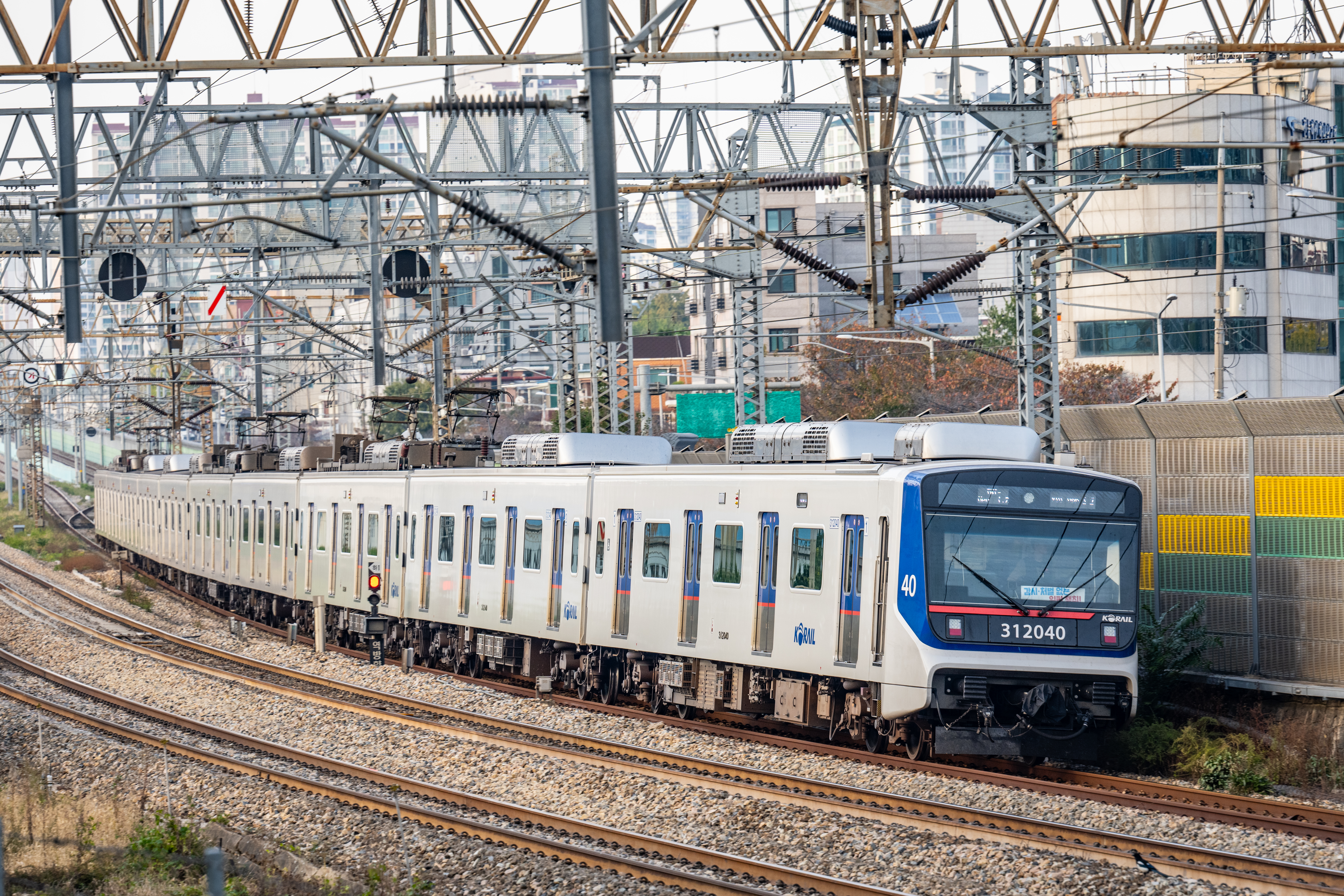
Class 312000 (6th generation)

== Refurbishment ==
Older Class 311000 trains were overhauled from 2004 to 2006 (though minor refurbishments began in 2002). Major and minor refurbishments are listed below.

=== Overhaul ===
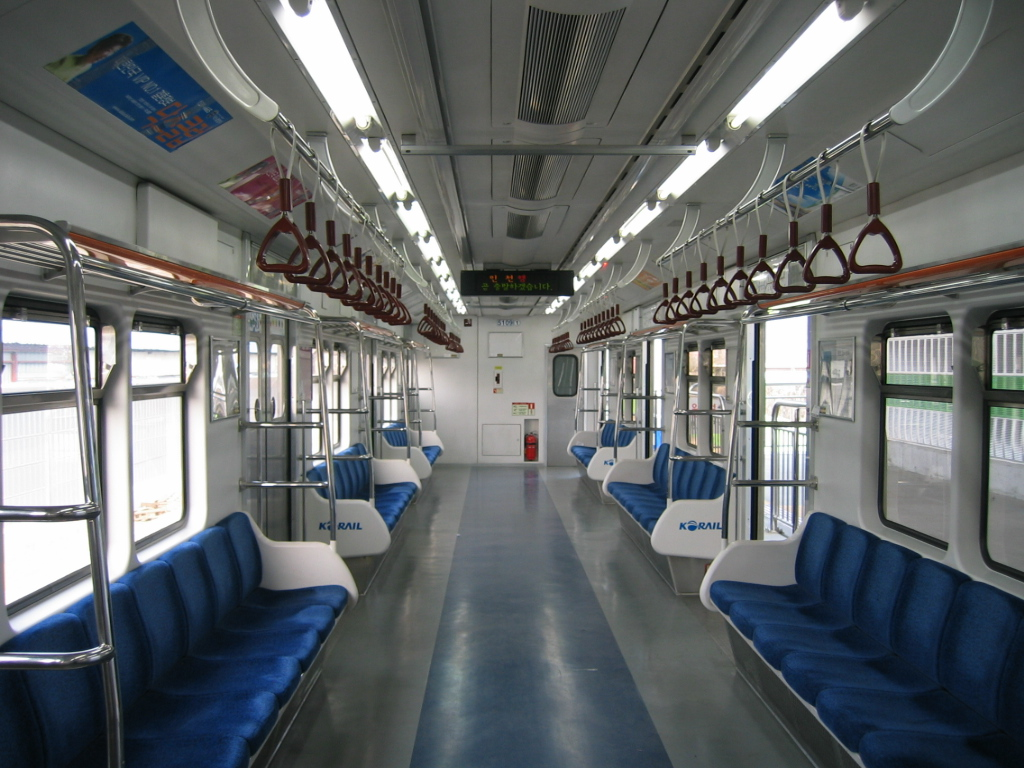
Refurbished interior of 2nd batch train

The Daegu subway fire compelled Korail to introduce flame-resistant interiors for passenger safety. As a result, all trains built before 2004 were overhauled with fire-retardant interiors.

=== Electric parts ===
- 2002: Stop notifiers were installed . After overhauls between 2004 and 2005, TGIS systems were improved to integrate the stop notifiers.
- 2003: Comonet broadcasting system was introduced in train 311–37. It has since been removed.
- 2004: SIV traction systems were replaced with IGBT traction systems built by Woojin Industrial Systems.
- 2006: Trains 311-60~311-62, and part of trains 311-63 (311163, 311263 & 311563) used IGBT inverters (other cars in train 311-63 used GTO inverters). Later on, these trains had their GTO inverters replaced with IGBT inverters.
- 2007: The inverter of car 311880 (at the time numbered 5783) was changed temporarily.
- 2012: Train 311-35 was retrofitted with IGBT inverters, trains 311–47, 311–53~311–54 had their air-powered door motors replaced with electric-powered door motors, and train 311-75 was retrofitted with LED headlights to test out LED headlights as an option for all existing and future Korail metro railcars.
- 2015: Trains 311-13 and 311–16, and 311-48 were retrofitted with IGBT inverters, and trains 311-51~311-52, 311–55~311~60 had their air-powered door motors replaced with electric-powered door motors.
- 2016: Trains 311-37~311-41 were retrofitted with IGBT inverters.
- 2017: Trains 311-54~311-56, 311–59 were retrofitted with IGBT inverters.

Since August 2008, all trains were retrofitted with automatic gangway doors (similar retrofits were also done in Class 321000, 341000, and 351000 trains). This retrofit included the installation of automatic doors to replace the older doors that were manually pulled open; gangway doors can now be automatically opened by the push of a button. This retrofit process was completed by 2013.

All trains are now being retrofitted with LED headlights, following the successful testing of LED headlights in trains 311-75 and 311-92~311-94.

=== Renumbering ===
Starting from March 2011, former Class 5000 trains were renumbered from the 5000-series to the 311000-series as a part of a new numbering scheme by Korail (the leading "3" indicating a metro car). Renumbering was finished in September 2011.

== Accidents ==
- On May 12, 2007, a Class 4400 locomotive bound for Incheon crashed into train 5–19 at Yeongdeungpo station. As a result, the two cars nearest to the locomotive (5119 and 5719) were seriously damaged and subsequently scrapped, while the remaining cars were refurbished into Class 319000 trains 319-06 and 319-07 (two trains of four cars).
- On May 1, 2010, train 311-74 (which was known as Class 5000 train 5–75 at the time of the accident) was involved in an accident with Class 1000 train 1–58 at the Guro Car Depot. As a result, car 1158 suffered major damage and was scrapped, while 5075 suffered minor damage at the front, so the whole train was taken to be renumbered into Class 311000 train 311–74 with car 5075 being repaired.

== Conversions ==
Many former Class 5000 trains were not renumbered into the 311000-series and were instead converted into other classes.

=== Class 319000 ===
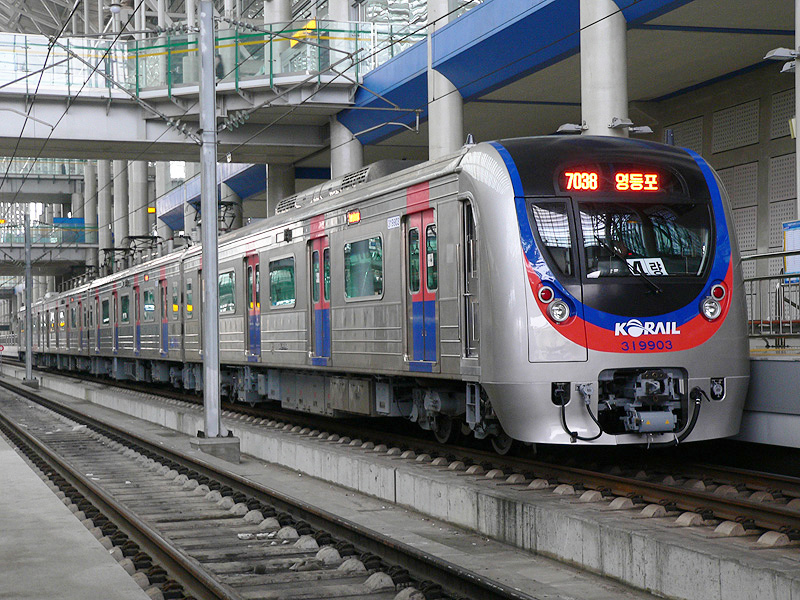
Class 319000 train 319–03, created from parts of Class 5000 trains 5–79~5–80.

After it was discovered that the Yeongdungpo-Gwangmyeong shuttle service on Line 1 had a relatively low ridership, it was decided to cut down the number of cars on trains dedicated to the shuttle service. As a result, seven trains, numbered 319-01~319-07 were formed using out-of-service cars and surplus trains.

Trains 319-01~319-05 were formed from parts of former Class 5000 trains 5–79~5–80 and 5–86~5–92. Meanwhile, trains 319-06~319-07 were formed from the eight remaining cars from former Class 5000 train 5–19. The gangways and interiors were refurbished as the cars were being converted and rearranged.

Three additional trains were ordered along with 5th generation Class 311000 trains 312-04~312-07 (for a total of 58 cars). The trains are numbered 319-08~319-10, and will be relegated to a future shuttle service between Soyosan and Yeoncheon stations when a reconstructed section of track between the stations is reopened. In the interim, train 319-08 is being operated on the Suin-Bundang Line.

=== Class 321000 ===
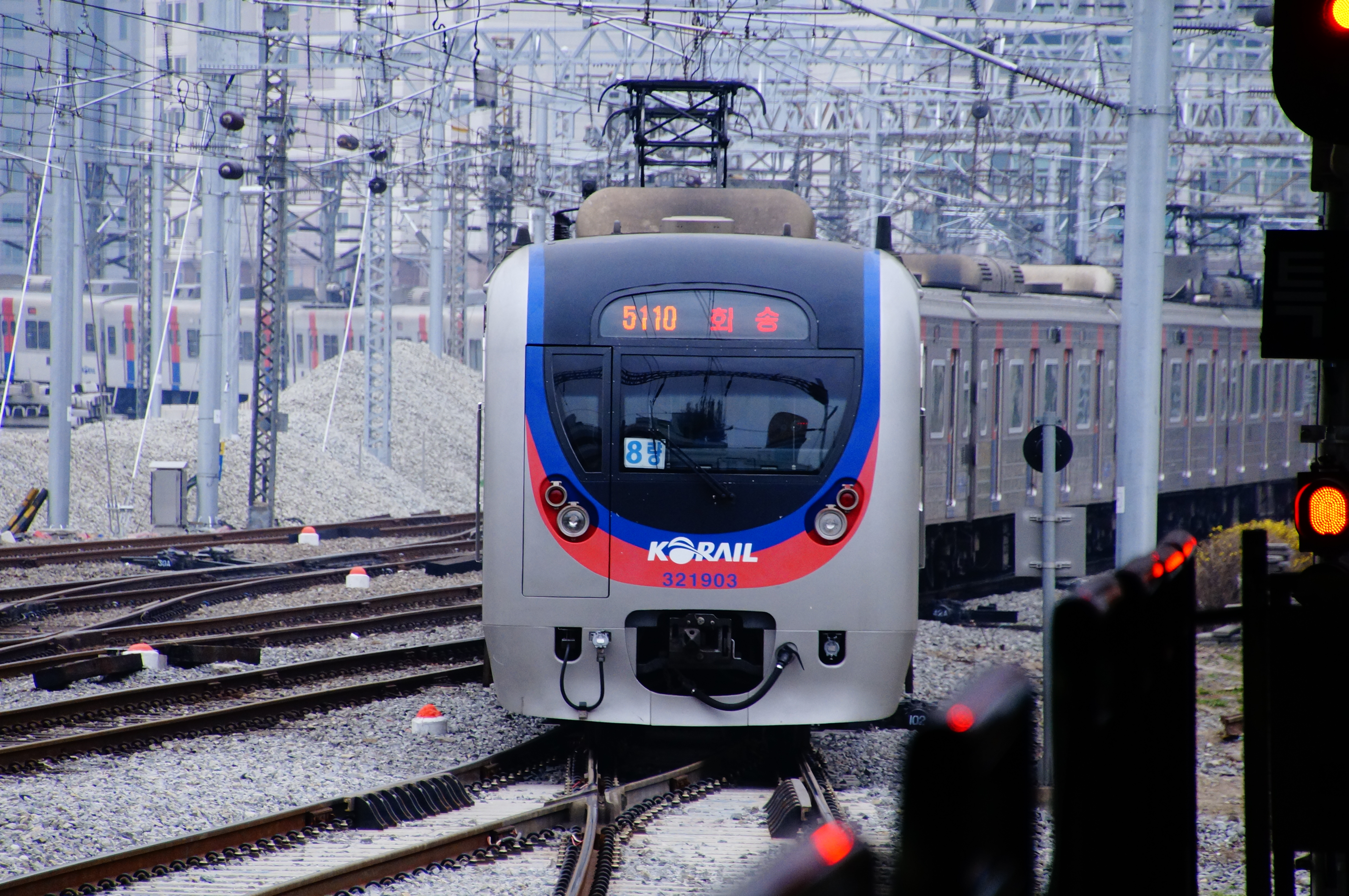
Class 321000 train 321–03, created from shortening Class 5000 train 5–88.

Trains 321-01~321-07 were formed from former Class 5000 trains 5–86~5–92 by reducing each train by two cars and subsequently renumbering each train. The excess cars were then used for Class 319000 trains 319-01~319-05 and parts of 321–15~321–18, along with some excess cars from Class 6000 trains. These trains now operate on the Gyeongui-Jungang Line.

== See also ==
- Korail
- Seoul Subway Line 1
- LRTA 2000 class
