= Korail Class 321000 =

South Korean train

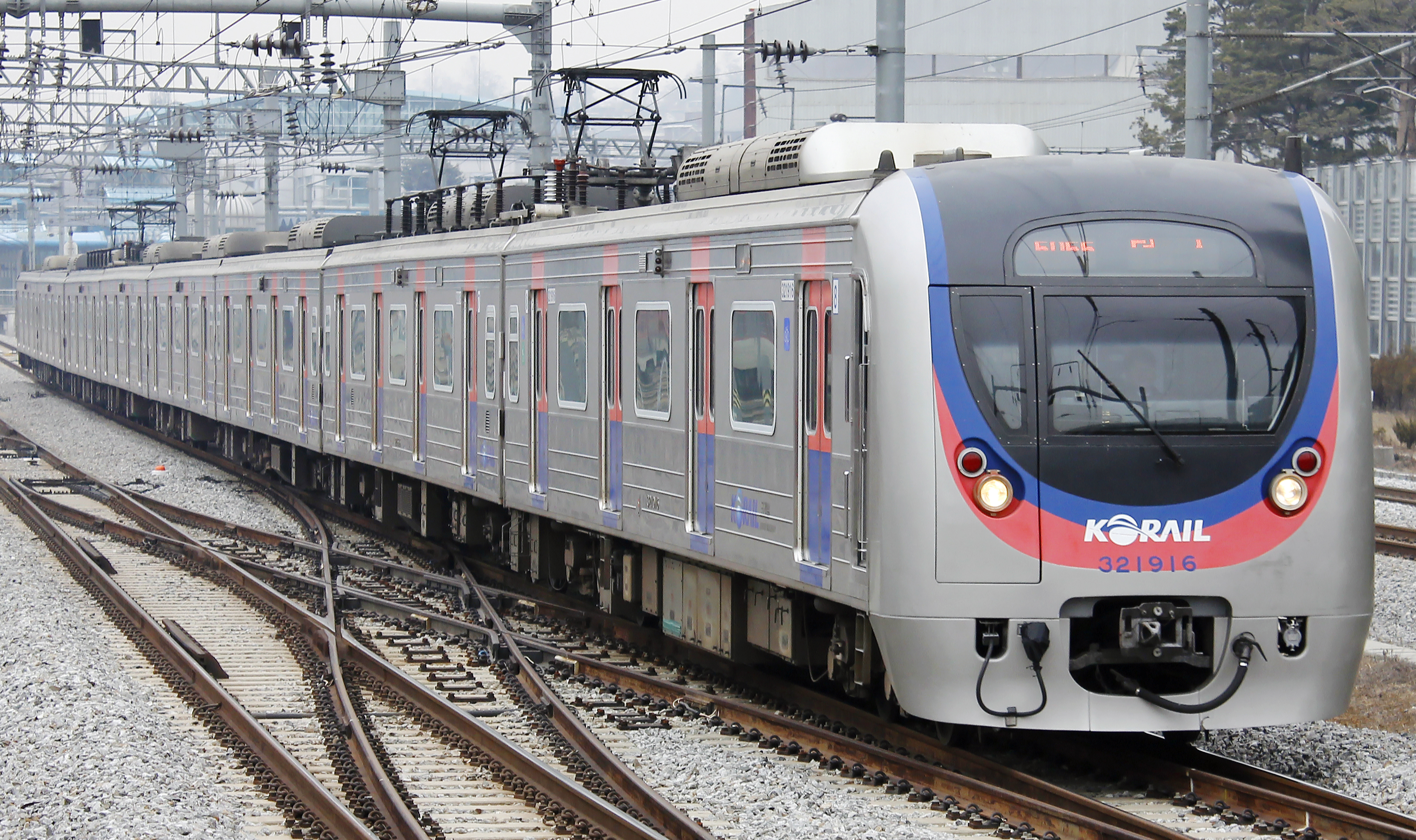
- Class 321000 train 321-16 arriving at Digital Media City station
- In service: 2008-present
- Manufacturer: 321-01~321-18 (part): Rotem; 321-18 (part)~321-21: Hyundai Rotem
- Constructed: 321-01~321-18(part): 2006; 321-18(part): 2008; 321-19~321-21: 2009
- Refurbished: 2010-2011
- Formation: 8 cars per train TC-M-M'-T-T-M-M'-TC
- Operators: Korail
- Depots: Yongmun
- Lines served: Gyeongui-Jungang Line

Specifications
- Car body construction: Steel
- Doors: 4 per side, 8 per car
- Maximum speed: 110 km/h (68 mph)
- Traction system: Toshiba COVO52-A0 VVVF-IGBT propulsion system using IGBT 1C4M motors
- Power output: 4,400 kW (5,900 hp)
- Acceleration: 3.0 km/(h⋅s) (1.9 mph/s)
- Deceleration: 3.5 km/(h⋅s) (2.2 mph/s) (service); 4.5 km/(h⋅s) (2.8 mph/s) (emergency)
- Electric system(s): 25 kV 60 Hz AC/1.5 kV DC overhead catenary
- Current collection: Pantograph
- Braking system(s): Regenerative
- Safety system(s): ATS
- Coupling system: Shibata-type
- Track gauge: 1,435 mm (4 ft 8 1/2 in)

The Korail Class 321000 trains, created from an assortment of Class 5000, Class 6000, and new cars, are commuter electric multiple units in South Korea used on the Gyeongui-Jungang Line. Class 321000 trains were manufactured and delivered between 2006–2009 to provide service on what was known as the Jungang Line at the time, and to address progressing extensions starting from the extension to Paldang station.

== Technical details ==
=== Electrical parts ===
All trains use IGBT controls and use passive cooling with a heat pipe. The trains are also equipped with regenerative braking, reducing energy consumption and simplifying train inspection, and they use electric door motors.

=== Interior design ===
The Class 321000 trains sport a white-colored interior. LED monitors are installed on the top of each car for trains 321-01~321-14, and LCD monitor displays are installed on the side of each car for trains 321-15~321-21. The end cars have a space for wheelchairs, and trains 321-20~321-21 feature bike racks and retractable seating.

=== Cabin ===
The Class 321000 trains share the same cabin design with the Class 311000 as many of the cars are converted Class 311000 trains. Stop notifiers are installed, as are TGIS use color displays. Dead section notifiers are also installed.

== Formation ==
The Class 321000 trains are organized into an TC-M-M'-T-T-M-M'-TC formation. The symbols are defined below.

- M' car: pantograph, main transformer, controller, motor
- M car: controller
- Tc car: Secondary power device, SIV, and air compressor, battery
- T car: trailer (unpowered)

The cars of each train are numbered to correspond to the type of car each car is: 3210XX - Tc (trailer driving car) 3211XX - M (motor car) 3212XX - M' (motor car) 3213XX - T (trailer) 3214XX - T 3215XX - M 3216XX - M' 3219XX - Tc

== Depot ==
The Class 321000 trains are stored at the Yongmun train depot, which is a few kilometers east of Yongmun station.

== Batches ==
=== 1st batch ===
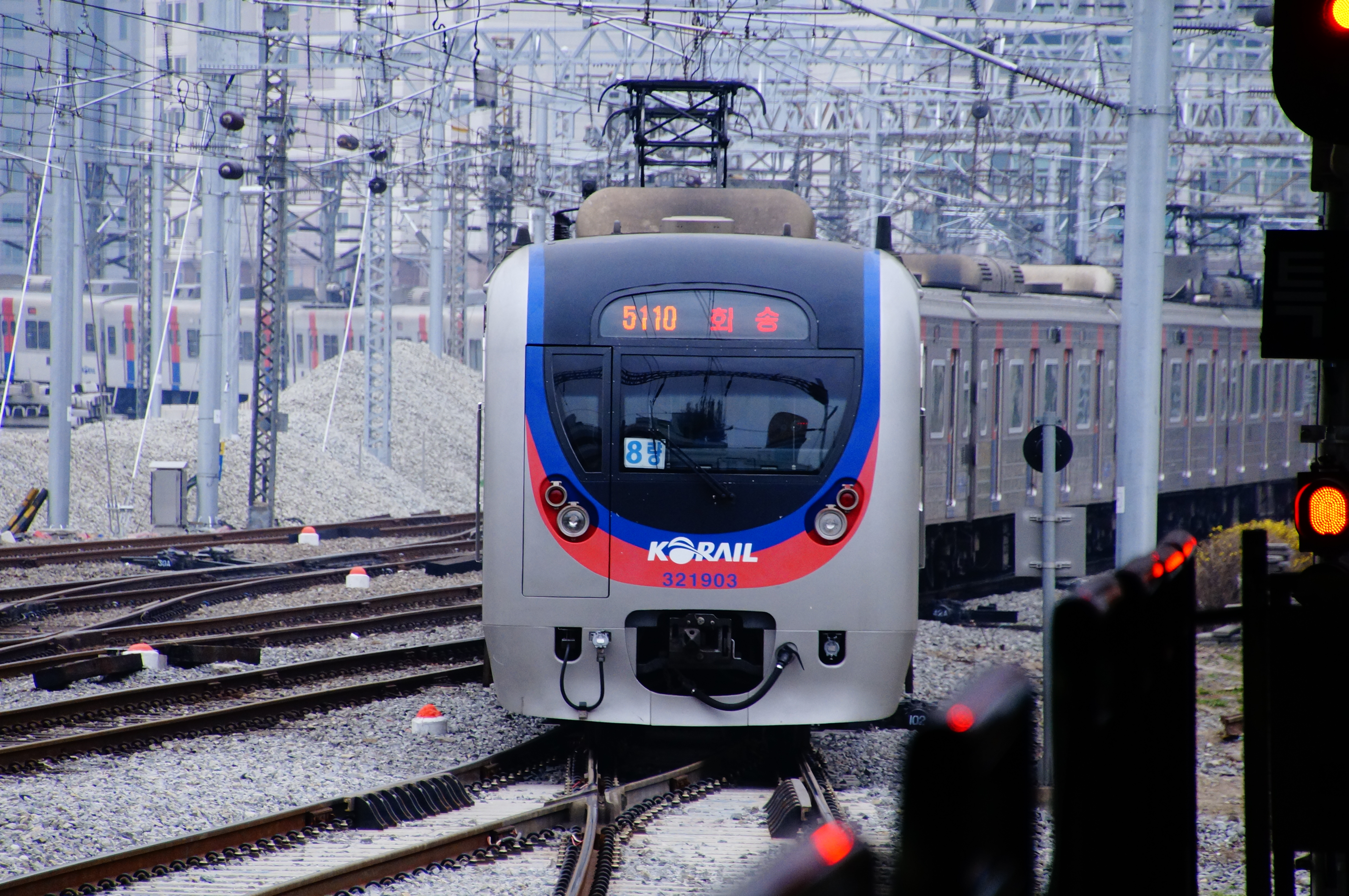
Class 321000 (first batch) train 321-03 (ex-Class 5000 train 5-88)

The first batch of Class 321000 trains were originally Class 5000 (3rd generation) and Class 6000 trains. The trains were renumbered to their current numbers when the Gyeongui·Jungang Line (at the time the Jungang Line) was extended to Paldang station from Deokso station. As a result, the first batch Class 321000 trains are exactly identical to the 3rd generation Class 311000 trains.

The first batch trains are numbered 321-01~321-14. Trains 321-01~321-07 are former 3rd generation Class 5000 trains 5-86~5-92 that built in 2006 and converted in 2008. Trains 321-08~321-14, on the other hand, are former Class 6000 trains 6-01~6-07 that were also built in 2006 and converted in 2008. Each train was shortened down from 10 to eight cars during conversion.

=== Second batch ===
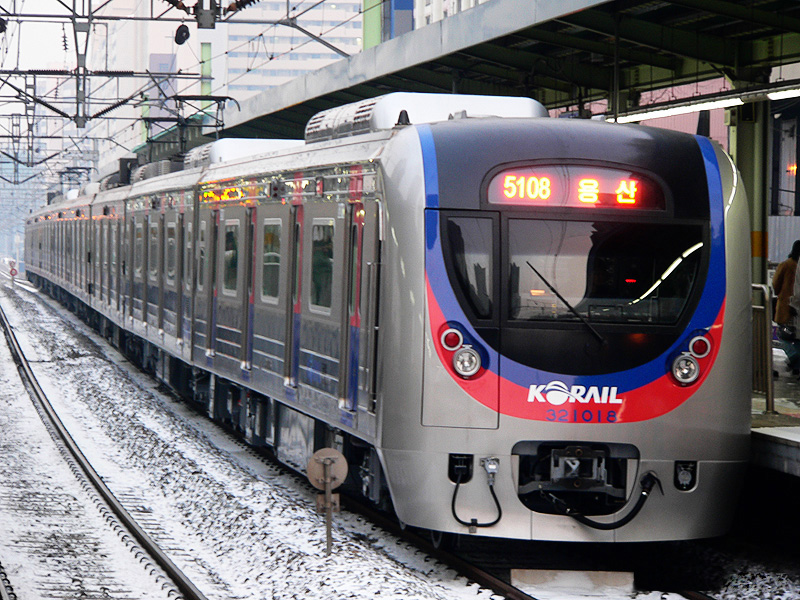
Class 321000 (second batch) train 321-18

The second batch of Class 321000 trains were introduced following the Gyeongui·Jungang Line's eastward extension from Paldang to Guksu station. The second batch trains were formed from the surplus of cars resulting from the shortening of trains 321-01~321-14 from 10 to eight cars; 28 cars were left over for an available total of four additional trains (4 new cars were made to bring the total number of available cars to 32 cars, or four 8-car trains).

The second batch trains are numbered 321-15~321-18. All trains had their overhead LED monitors replaced with LCD monitors on the sides (above the doors). Train 321-18 uses four newly made cars due to the lack of available cars.

=== 3rd batch ===
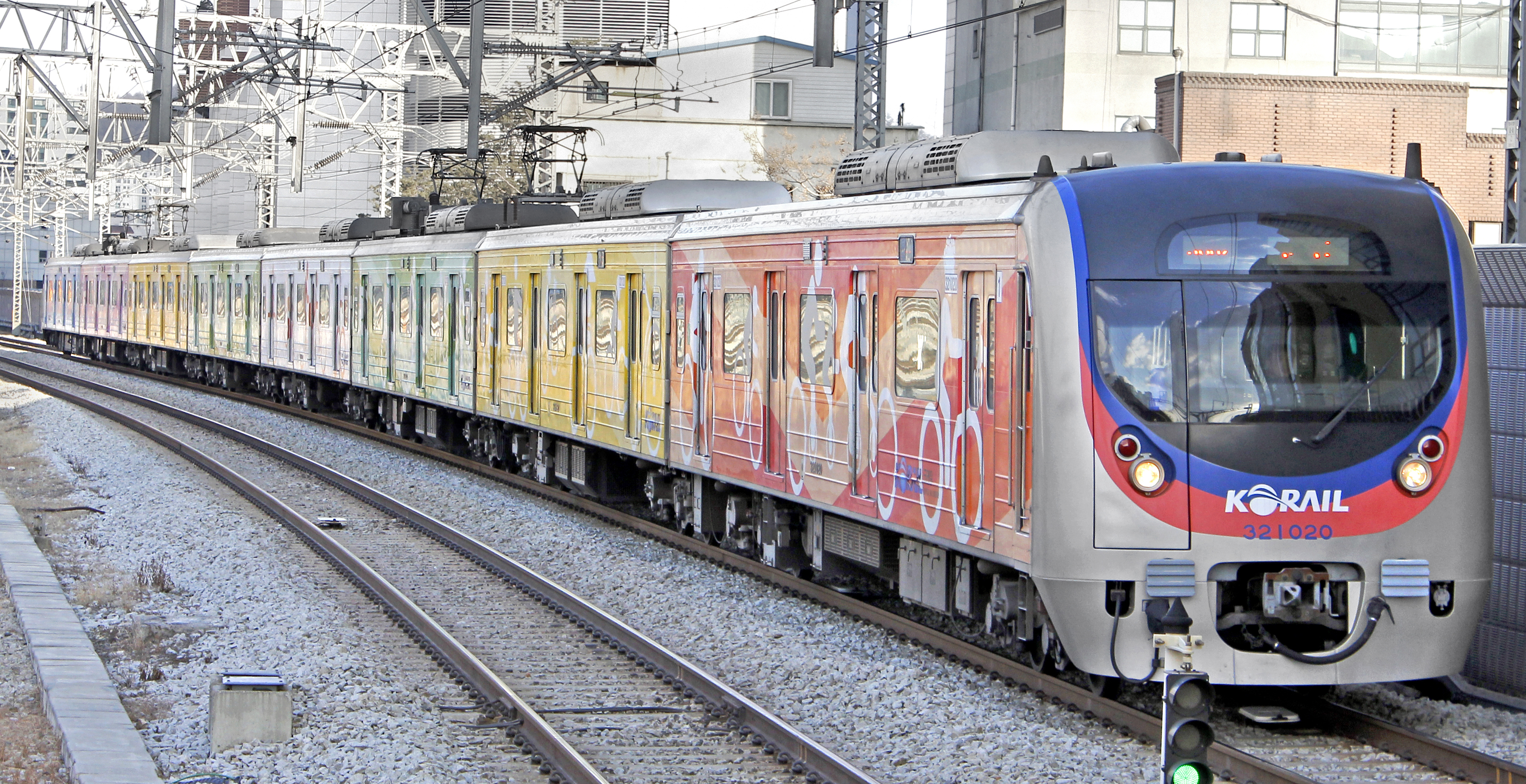
Class 321000 (third batch) train 321-20

The third batch of Class 321000 trains were introduced following the Gyeongui·Jungang Line's eastward extension from Guksu to Yongmun station. The third batch trains were manufactured and introduced in 2009, few months prior to the opening of the final eastward extension.

The third batch trains are numbered 321-19~321-21. All trains were delivered with LCD monitors on the sides (above the doors), and feature newer exterior LED destination signs that are capable of scrolling. The front end was modified, and had been the blueprint of all subsequent Korail metro cars for the Seoul Metropolitan Subway from 2009 to 2018. Trains 321-20~321-21 feature flip-up seats and bike racks.

== Refurbishment ==
In 2016, many trains were retrofitted with LED headlights.

=== Gangway refurbishment ===
From August 2011, all trains gradually received gangway refurbishments (similar refurbishments were also done in Class 311000 trains). Automatic doors were installed to replace the older, manually opened gangway doors. After refurbishment, gangway doors could be automatically opened by the push of a button.

== See also ==
- Korail
- Seoul Subway Line 1
- Gyeongui·Jungang Line
