= Guri station =

Train station in Guri, South Korea

구리 (구리도매시장); Guri (Guri Traditional Market)
구리; Guri
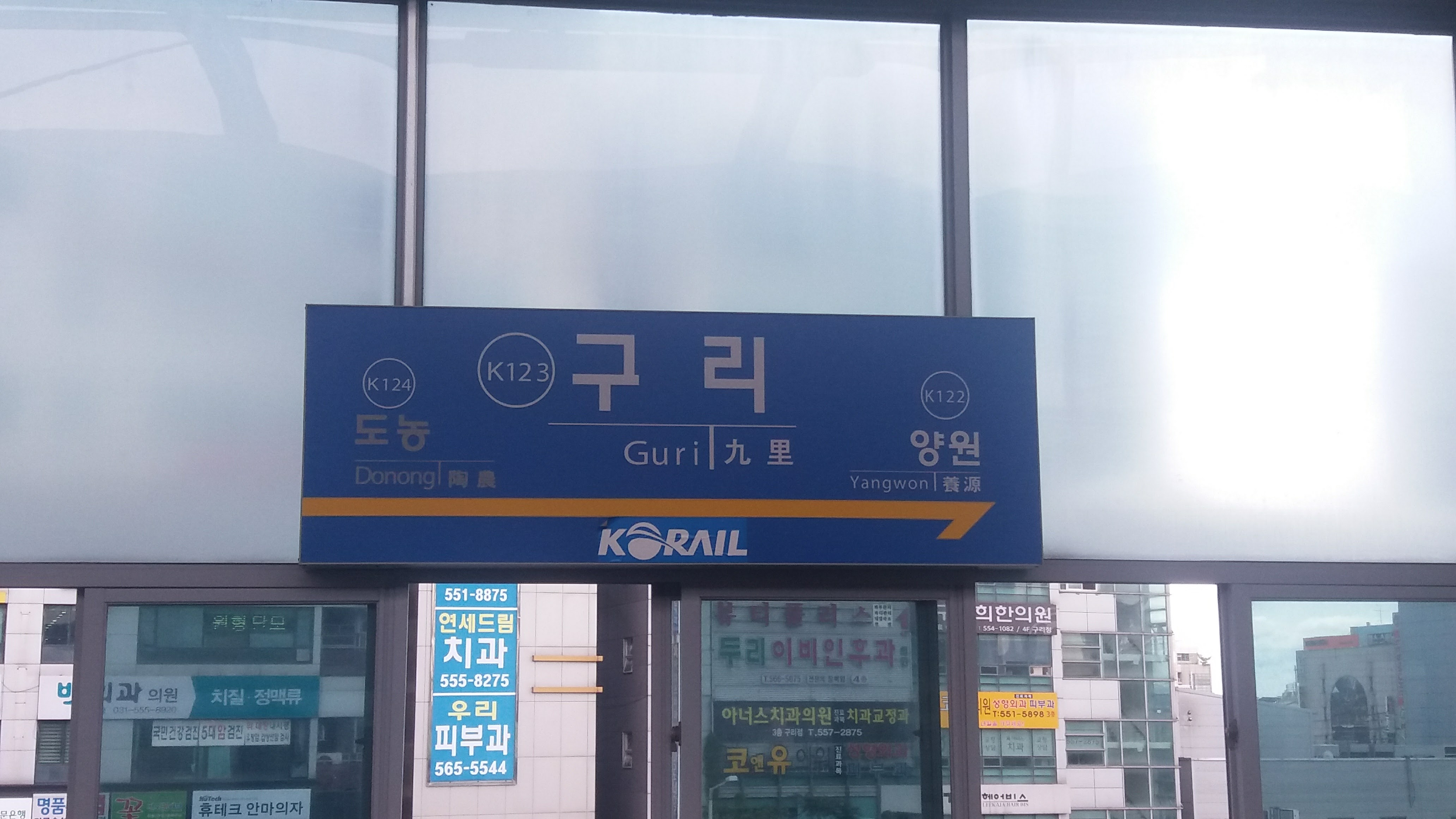
- Gyeongui–Jungang Line station nameplate

Korean name
- Hangul: 구리역
- Hanja: 九里驛
- Revised Romanization: Guri-yeok
- McCune–Reischauer: Kuri-yŏk

General information
- Location: 244-2 Inchang-dong, 32-29 Geonwondaero 34 Bongil, Guri-si, Gyeonggi-do
- Coordinates: 37°36′10.00″N 127°8′35.12″E
- Operator: Korail; Guri Urban Corporation
- Lines: Line 8 Gyeongui–Jungang Line
- Platforms: 2
- Tracks: 2

Construction
- Structure type: Aboveground

Key dates
- December 16, 2005: Gyeongui–Jungang Line opened
- August 10, 2024: Line 8 opened
Location

Guri station is a train station on the Gyeongui–Jungang Line. It is located in Inchang-dong, Guri, behind GS Square, a large department store in the central city area. Guri station is in Gyeonggi-do, whereas the previous western station, Yangwon station, is in Seoul.

The station is equipped with the standard selection of grocery and convenience businesses seen at Korean subway stations. Above, there is a ticket office, cash registers, and ticket vending machines.

It became a transfer station to Seoul Subway Line 8 in August 2024.

== Gallery ==
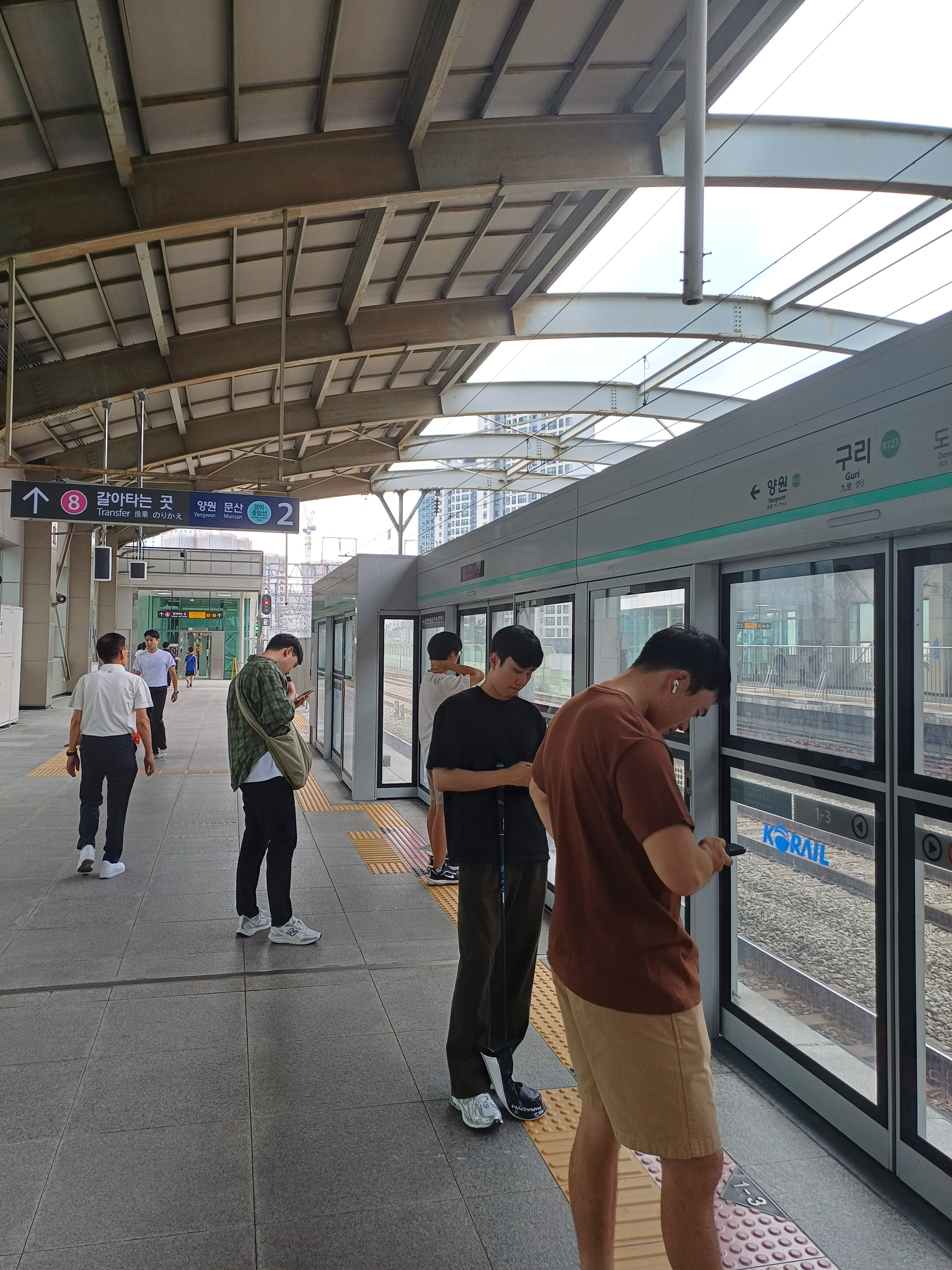
Gyeongui-Jungang Line platform

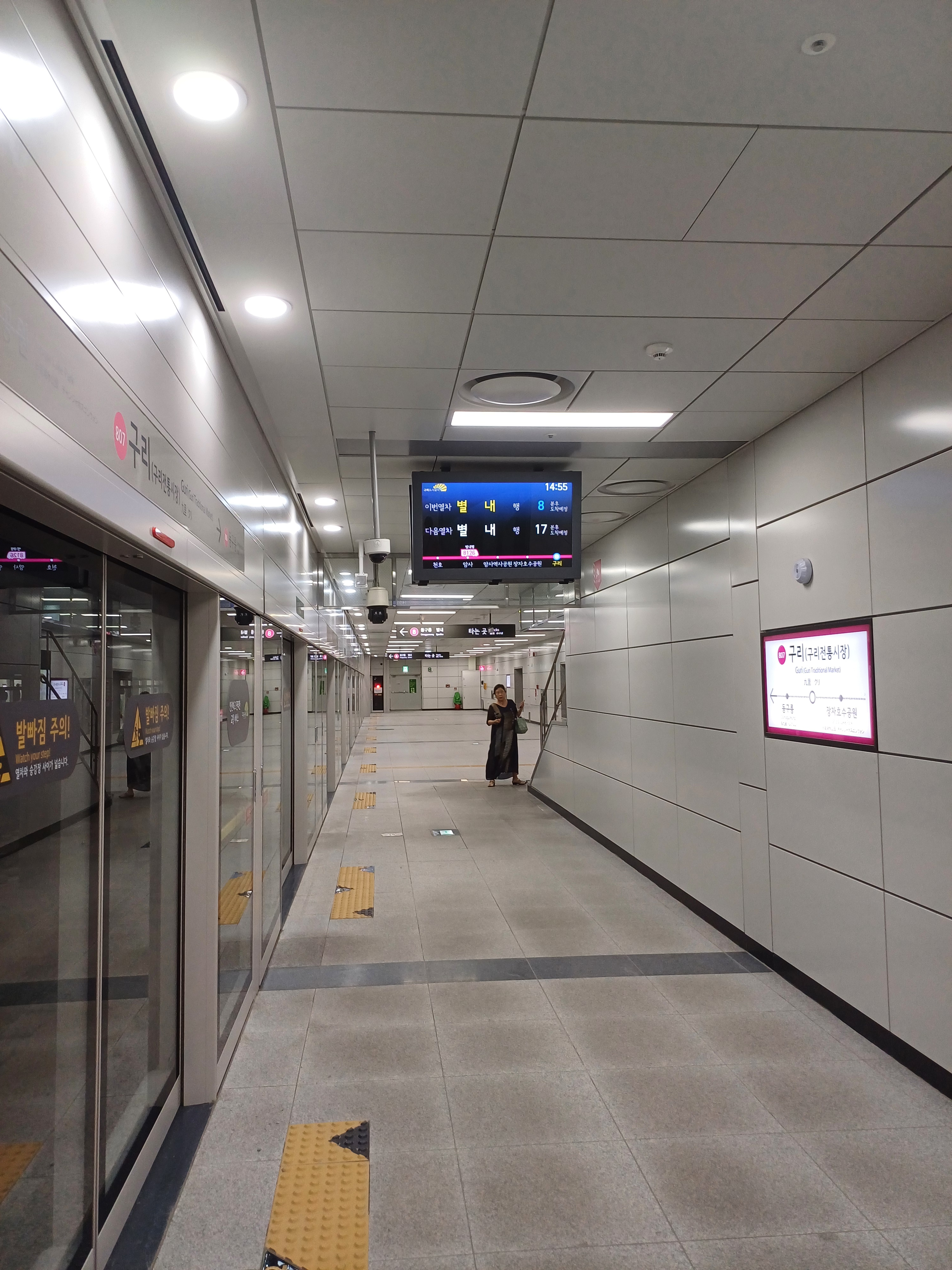
Line 8 platform

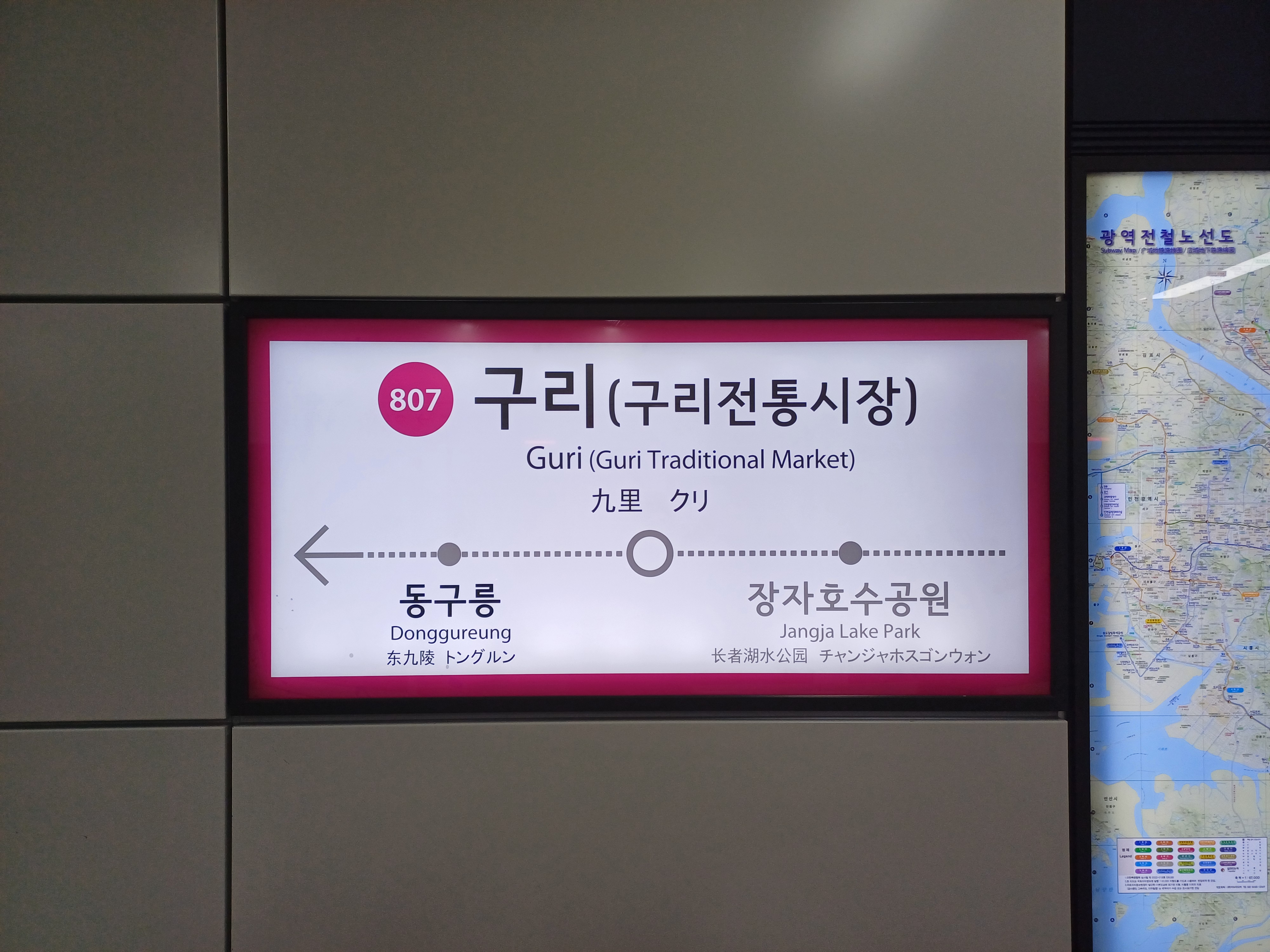
Line 8 station nameplate

== History ==
- August 10, 2024 - Line 8 platforms opened for service as part of the extension of from Amsa to Byeollae.

Preceding station	Seoul Metropolitan Subway	Following station
Donggureung towards Byeollae	Line 8	Jangja Lake Park towards Moran
Yangwon towards Munsan	Gyeongui–Jungang Line	Donong towards Jipyeong
Yangwon towards Munsan	Gyeongui–Jungang Line Gyeongui Express	Donong towards Yongmun
Sangbong towards Munsan	Gyeongui–Jungang Line Jungang Express	Donong towards Yongmun
