= Yangwon =

Yangwon (Korean: 양원) may refer to:

- Yangwon station, a train station in Seoul, South Korea
- Yangwon of Goguryeo (r. 545–559), ruler of Goguryeo
- Yi Yangwŏn (1526–1592), Korean scholar-official
