= Mangu station =

Railway station in Jungnang-gu, Seoul, South Korea

망우; Mangu
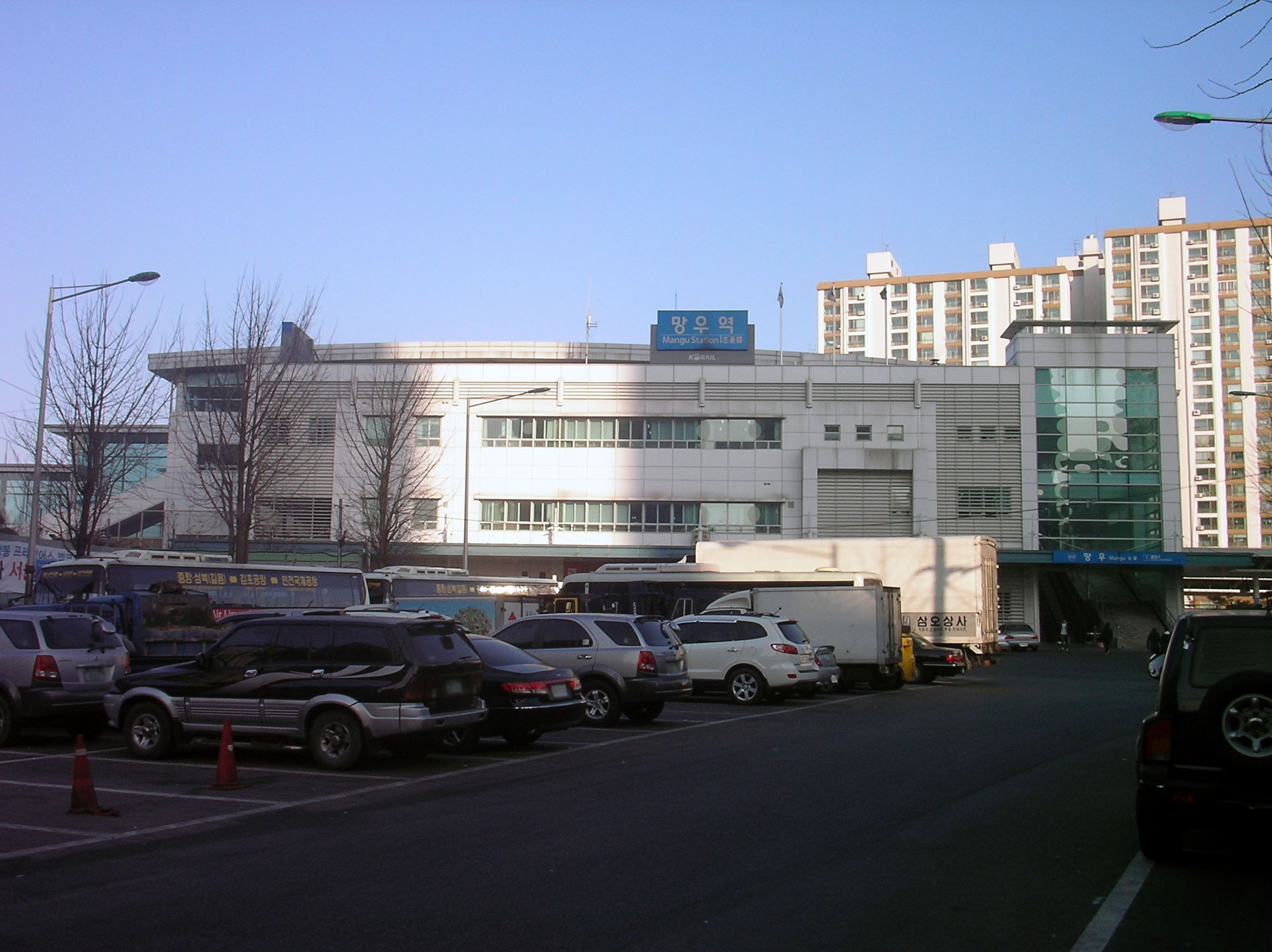

Korean name
- Hangul: 망우역
- Hanja: 忘憂驛
- Revised Romanization: Mangu-yeok
- McCune–Reischauer: Mangu-yŏk

General information
- Location: 172-3 Sangbong-dong, 11-10 Manguro 55 gil, Jungnang-gu, Seoul
- Coordinates: 37°35′57″N 127°05′32″E
- Operator: Korail
- Lines: Gyeongui–Jungang Line; Gyeongchun Line
- Platforms: 4
- Tracks: 6
- Connections: Sangbong Bus Terminal

Construction
- Structure type: Aboveground

History
- Opened: April 1, 1940

Key dates
- December 16, 2005: Gyeongui–Jungang Line opened
- December 21, 2010: Gyeongchun Line opened
Services
Preceding station	Seoul Metropolitan Subway	Following station
Sangbong towards Cheongnyangni or Kwangwoon University	Gyeongchun Line	Sinnae towards Chuncheon
Sangbong towards Munsan	Gyeongui–Jungang Line	Yangwon towards Jipyeong
Sangbong towards Munsan	Gyeongui–Jungang Line Gyeongui Express	Yangwon towards Yongmun
Location

Mangu station is a station on the Gyeongui–Jungang Line, and the Gyeongchun Line since 21 December 2010. The station was Seoul's main distribution center of charcoal briquettes in the 1950s and 1960s, extracted and manufactured in southern Gangwon province. These briquettes were widely used by people to weather harsh winters when Korea was a developing country and recovering from the Korean War. It is a station that still predominantly handles freight trains. It is very close to an E-Mart and Costco stores.

Although it is located close to the Sangbong bus terminal and Sangbong station, it has yet to fulfill its potential as a transportation hub. With the electrification and double tracking of the Gyeongchun Line, this station is the newly designated western terminus station (however, the Gyeongchun Line operates about 1 km west further till its de facto terminus, Sangbong).
