= Sangbong station =

Train station in Seoul, South Korea

상봉 (한국열린사이버대); Sangbong (OPEN CYBER UNIVERSITY)
상봉
Sangbong
상봉; Sangbong
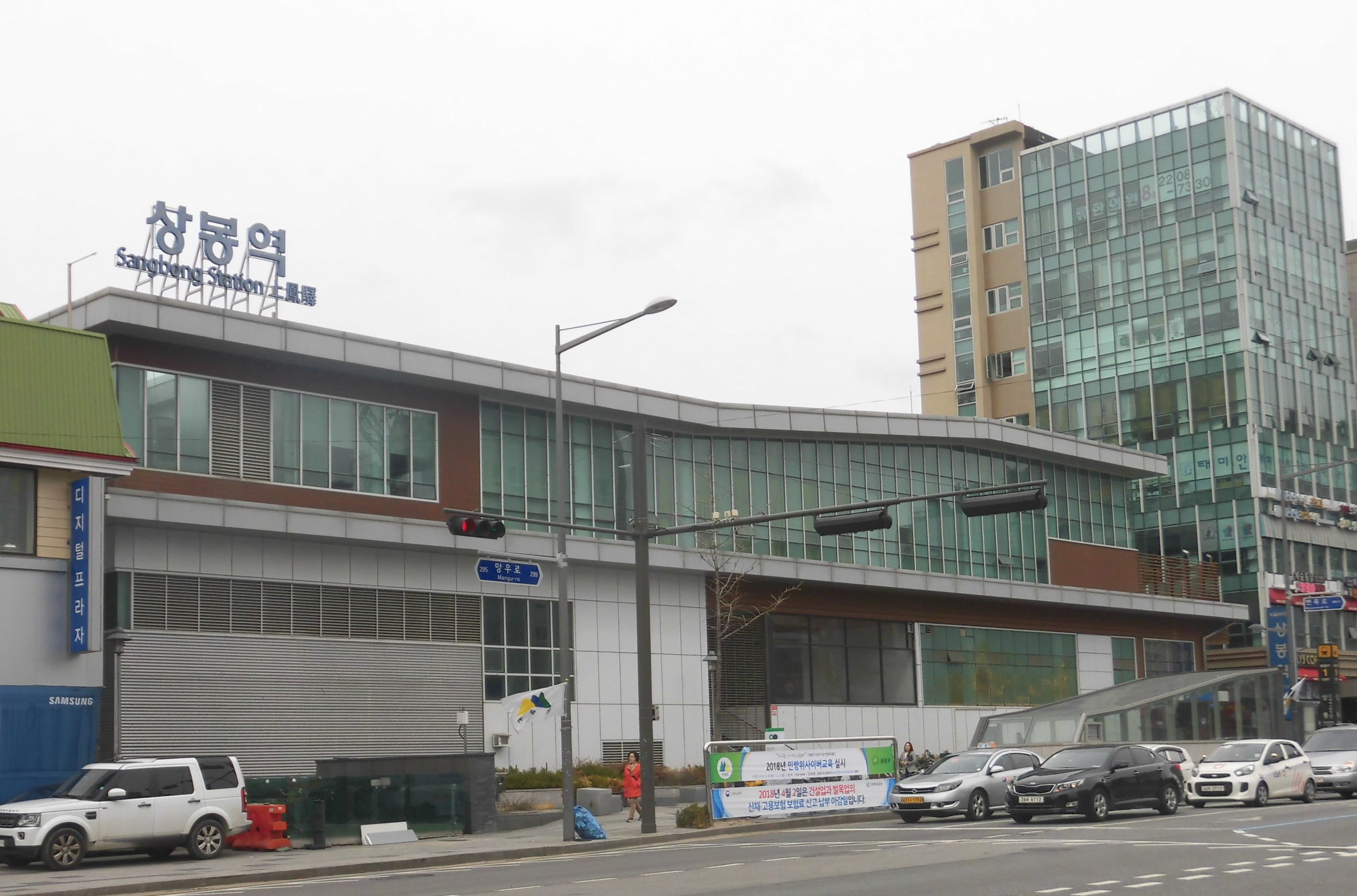

Korean name
- Hangul: 상봉역
- Hanja: 上鳳驛
- RR: Sangbong-yeok
- MR: Sangbong-yŏk

General information
- Location: 115 Sangbong-dong, Jungnang-gu, Seoul
- Coordinates: 37°35′44″N 127°05′09″E
- Operator: Seoul Metro; Korail
- Lines: Line 7 Gyeongui–Jungang Line; Gyeongchun Line
- Platforms: 5
- Tracks: 7

Key dates
- October 11, 1996: Line 7 opened
- December 21, 2010: Gyeongui–Jungang Line opened
- December 21, 2010: Gyeongchun Line opened
Services
Preceding station	Seoul Metropolitan Subway	Following station
Junghwa towards Jangam	Line 7	Myeonmok towards Seongnam
Kwangwoon University Terminus	Gyeongchun Line	Mangu towards Chuncheon
Jungnang towards Cheongnyangni	Gyeongchun Line	Mangu towards Chuncheon
Hoegi towards Cheongnyangni	Gyeongchun Line Express	Galmae towards Chuncheon
Jungnang towards Munsan	Gyeongui–Jungang Line	Mangu towards Jipyeong
Jungnang towards Munsan	Gyeongui–Jungang Line Gyeongui Express	Mangu towards Yongmun
Hoegi towards Munsan	Gyeongui–Jungang Line Jungang Express	Guri towards Yongmun
Preceding station	Korea Train Express	Following station
Cheongnyangni towards Haengsin or Seoul	Gangneung KTX	Deokso towards Donghae or Gangneung
Cheongnyangni towards Seoul	Jungang KTX	Deokso towards Bujeon
Preceding station	Korail	Following station
Cheongnyangni towards Yongsan	ITX-Cheongchun	Toegyewon towards Chuncheon
Location

Sangbong station is a station on Seoul Subway Line 7, the Gyeongchun Line and the Gyeongui–Jungang Line. It is located in Sangbong-dong, Jungnang-gu, Seoul.

== Gallery ==
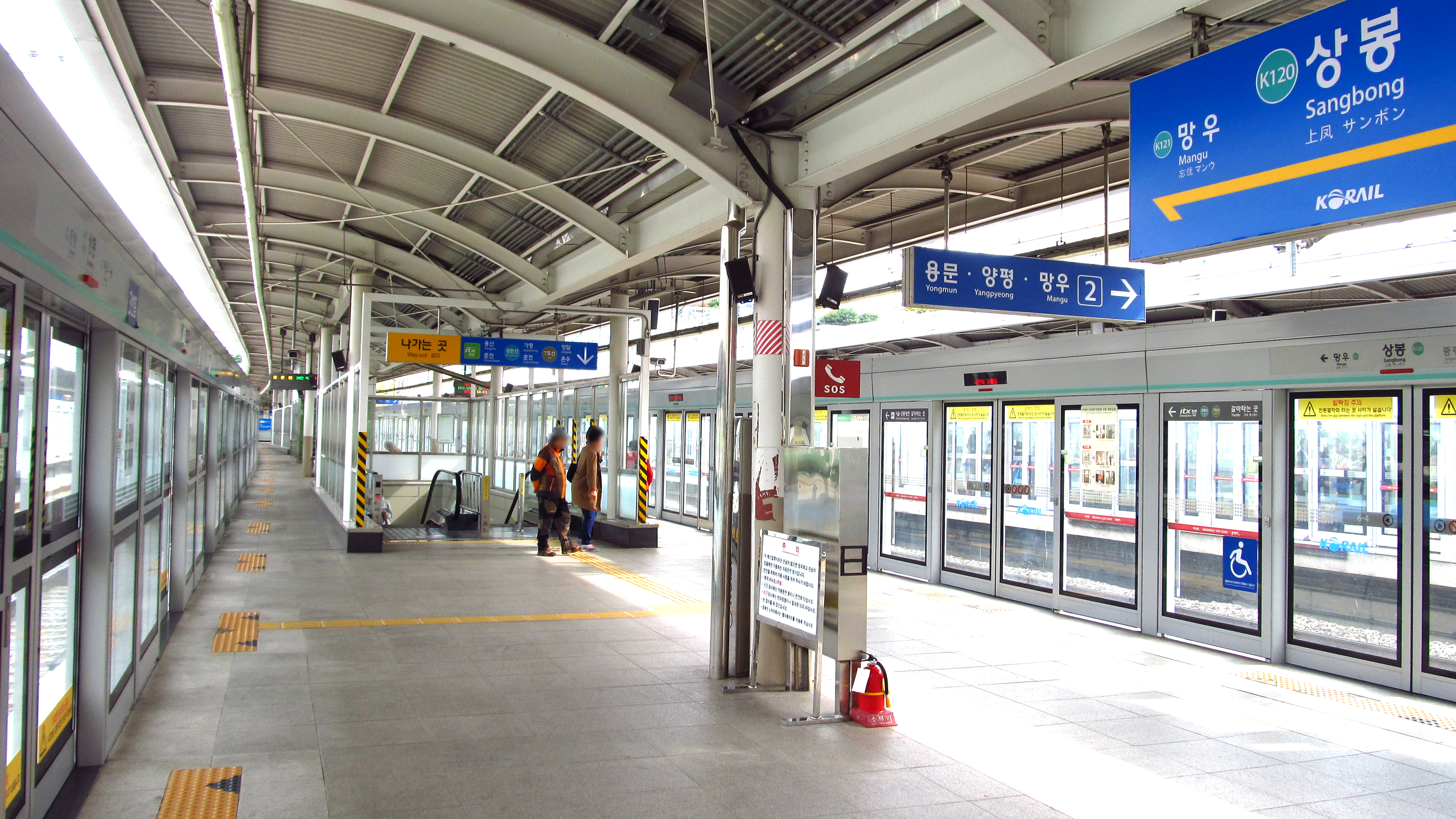
Gyeongui-Jungang Line platforms

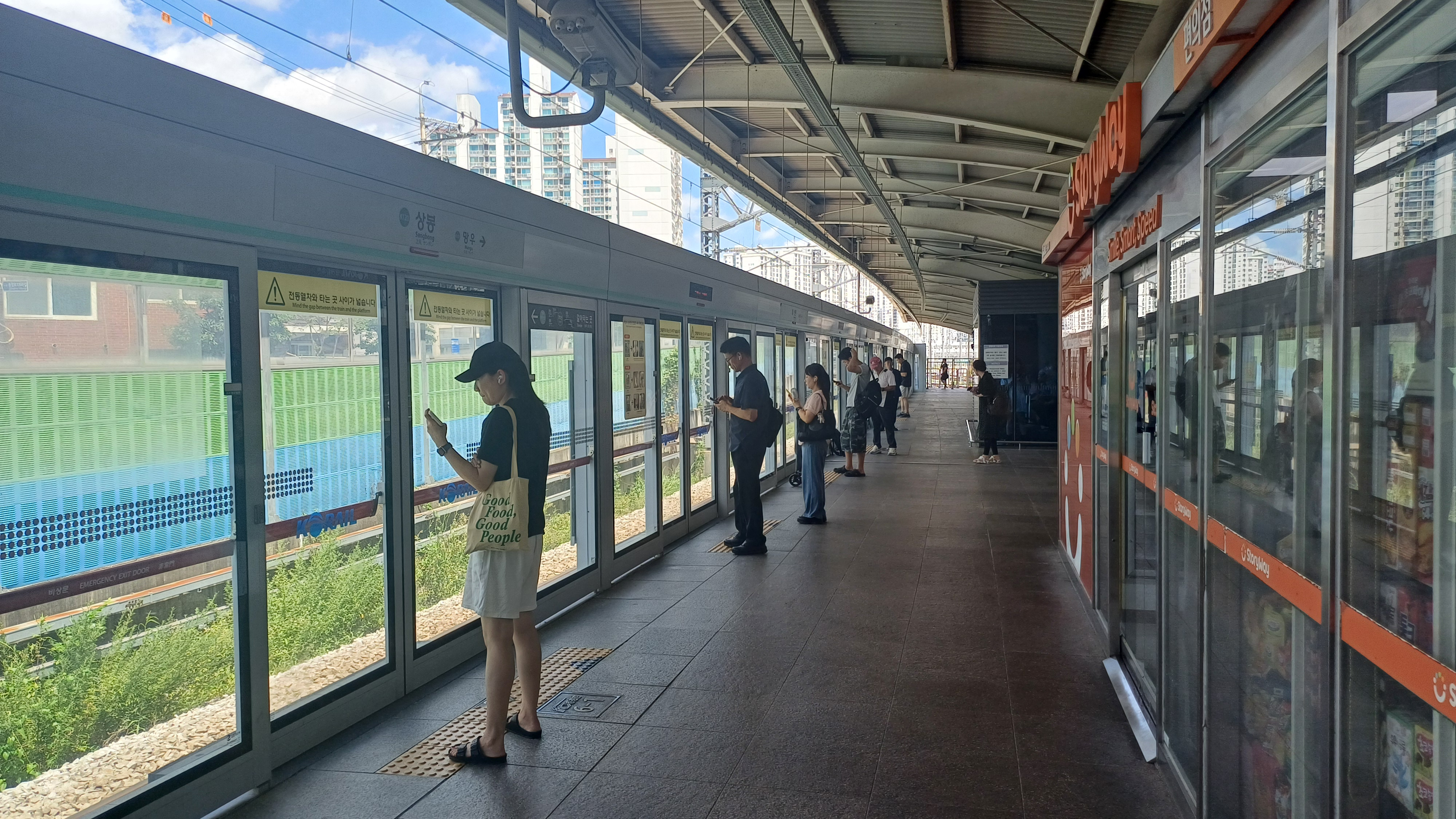
Gyeongchun Line platform

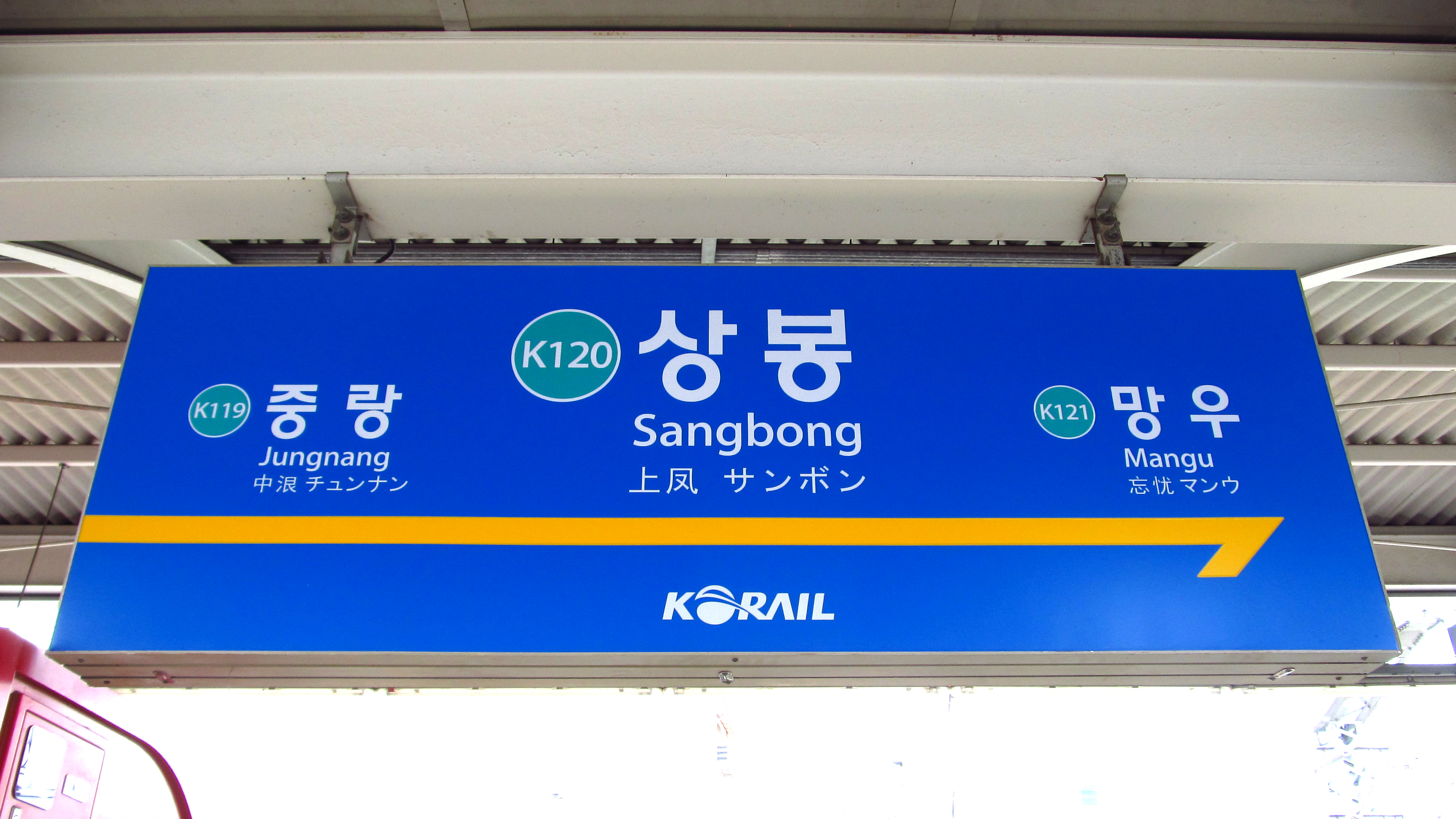
Korail station nameplate

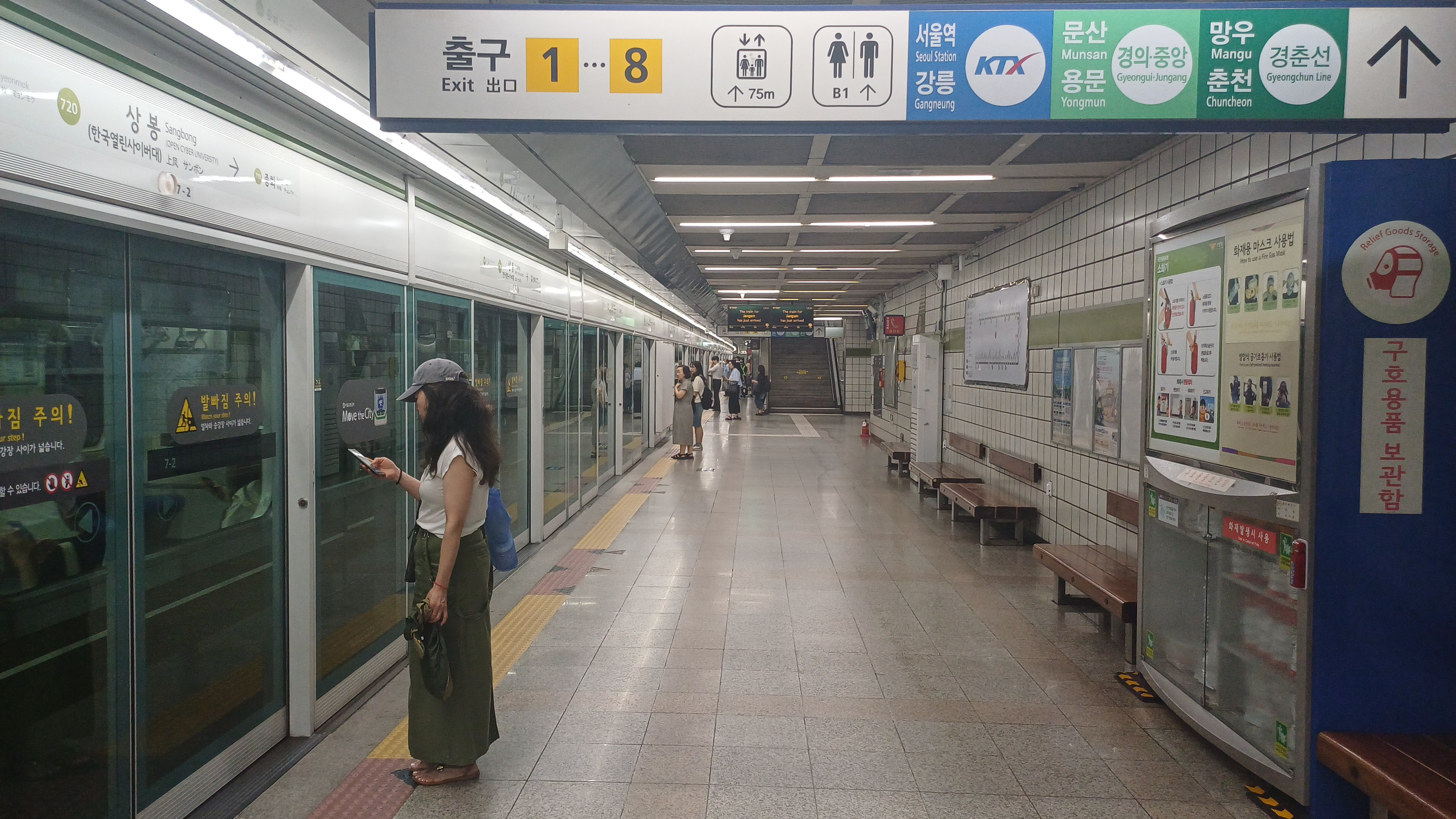
Line 7 platform

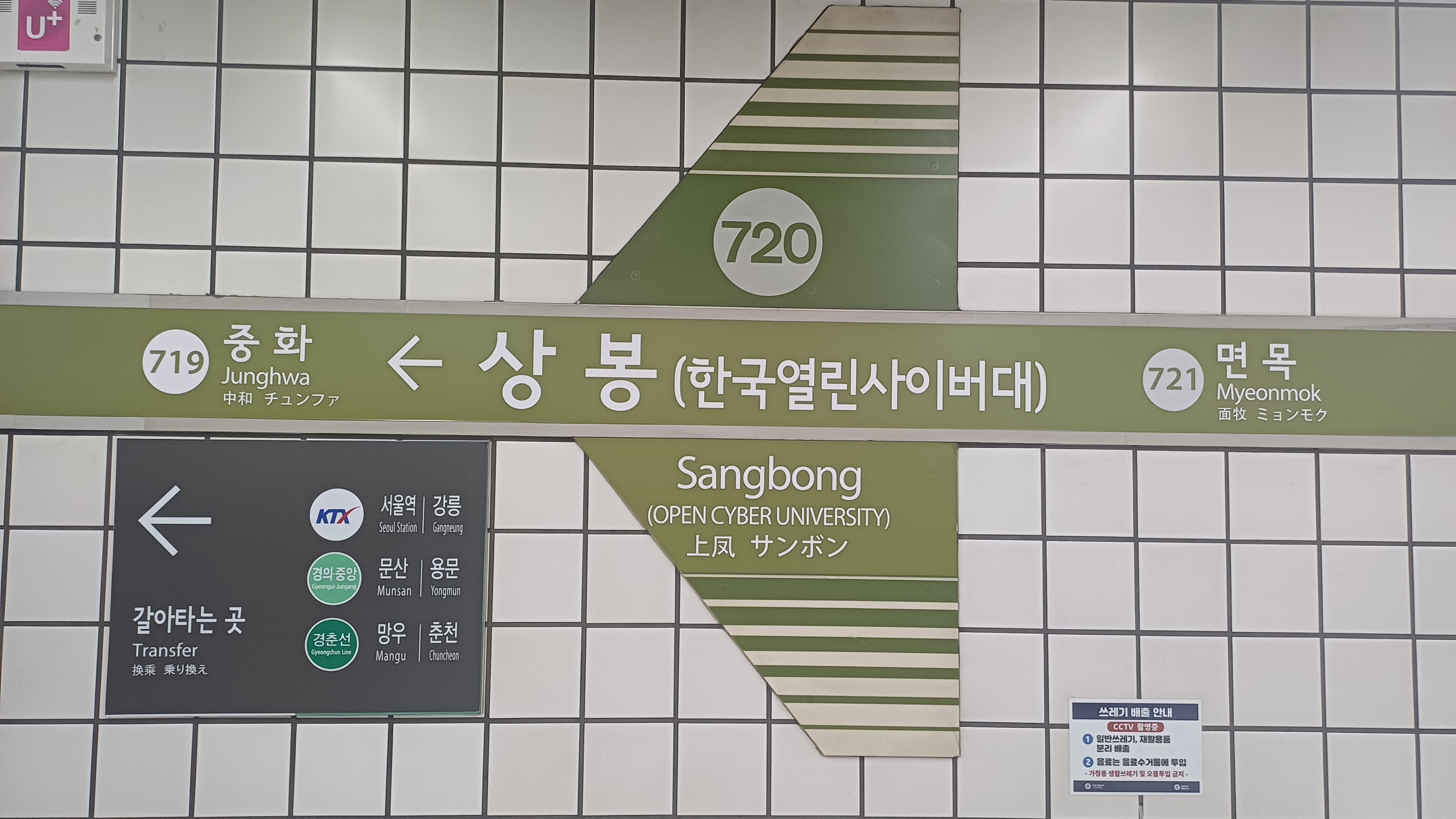
Line 7 station nameplate
