= Jangja Lake Park station =

Metro station in Guri, South Korea

장자호수공원; Jangja Lake Park
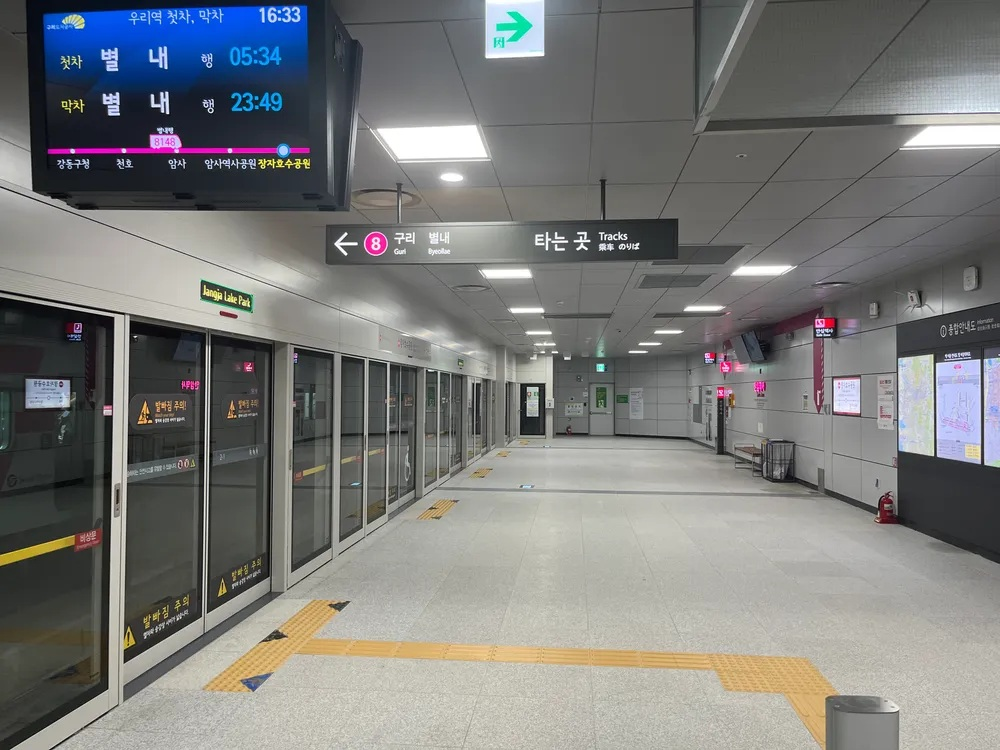
- Jangja Lake Park station's platform

Korean name
- Hangul: 장자호수공원역
- Hanja: 長者湖水公園驛
- RR: Jangja hosu gongwon-yeok
- MR: Changja hosu kongwŏn-yŏk

General information
- Location: Sutaek-dong, Guri; Gyeonggi Province
- Operator: Guri Urban Corporation
- Line: Line 8
- Platforms: 2
- Tracks: 2

Construction
- Structure type: Underground

Key dates
- August 10, 2024: Line 8 opened
Location

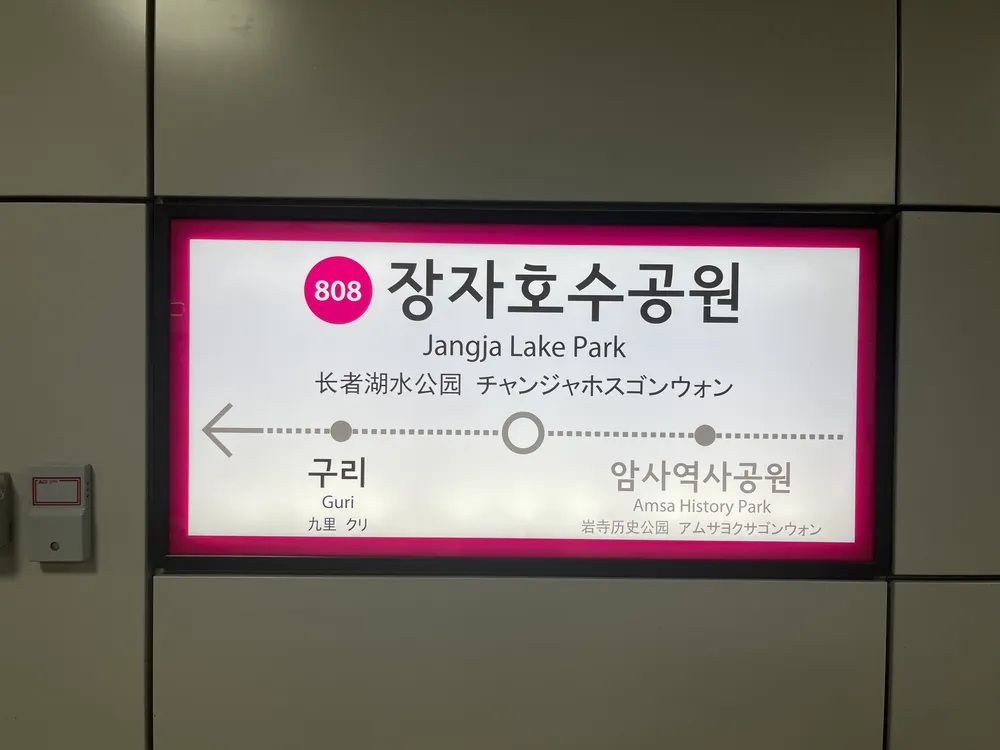
Jangja Lake Park station's nameplate

Jangja Lake Park station (Korean: 장자호수공원) is a subway station on Line 8 of the Seoul Metropolitan Subway system.

== History ==
- August 10, 2024 - Opened for service as part of the extension of Line 8 from Amsa to Byeollae.

== Station layout ==
Guri ↑
S/B | | N/B
↓ Amsa History Park

Northbound	← ● Line 8 toward Byeollae
Southbound	● Line 8 toward Moran →

Preceding station	Seoul Metropolitan Subway	Following station
Guri towards Byeollae	Line 8	Amsa History Park towards Moran
