= Sinimun station =

Train station in South Korea

신이문; Sinimun
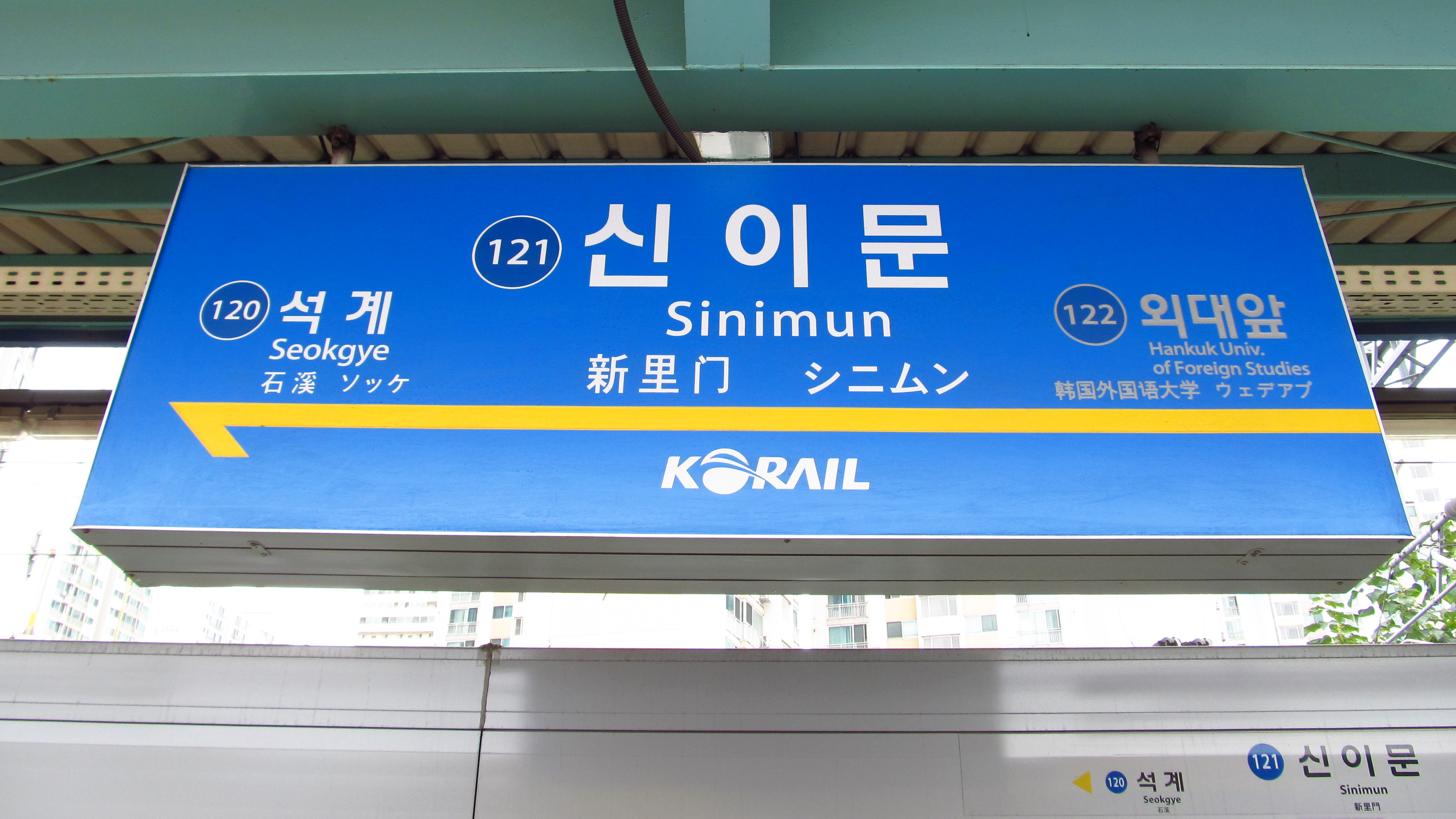
- Station Sign

Korean name
- Hangul: 신이문역
- Hanja: 新里門驛
- Revised Romanization: Sinnimunnyeok
- McCune–Reischauer: Sinnimunnyŏk

General information
- Location: 64-6 Imun-dong, 472 Hancheonno, Dongdaemun-gu, Seoul; South Korea
- Coordinates: 37°36′09″N 127°04′03″E
- Operator: Korail
- Line: Gyeongwon Line
- Platforms: 2
- Tracks: 2

Construction
- Structure type: Aboveground

History
- Opened: January 5, 1980

Passengers
- Based on Jan-Dec of 2012. Line 1: 20,107
Services
Preceding station	Seoul Metropolitan Subway	Following station
Seokgye towards Kwangwoon University or Yeoncheon	Line 1	Hankuk University of Foreign Studies towards Incheon, Seodongtan or Sinchang
Seokgye towards Dongducheon	Line 1 Gyeongwon Express	Hankuk University of Foreign Studies towards Incheon
Location

Sinimun Station is a station on Seoul Subway Line 1 between Hankuk University of Foreign Studies and the major intersection in Seokgye.

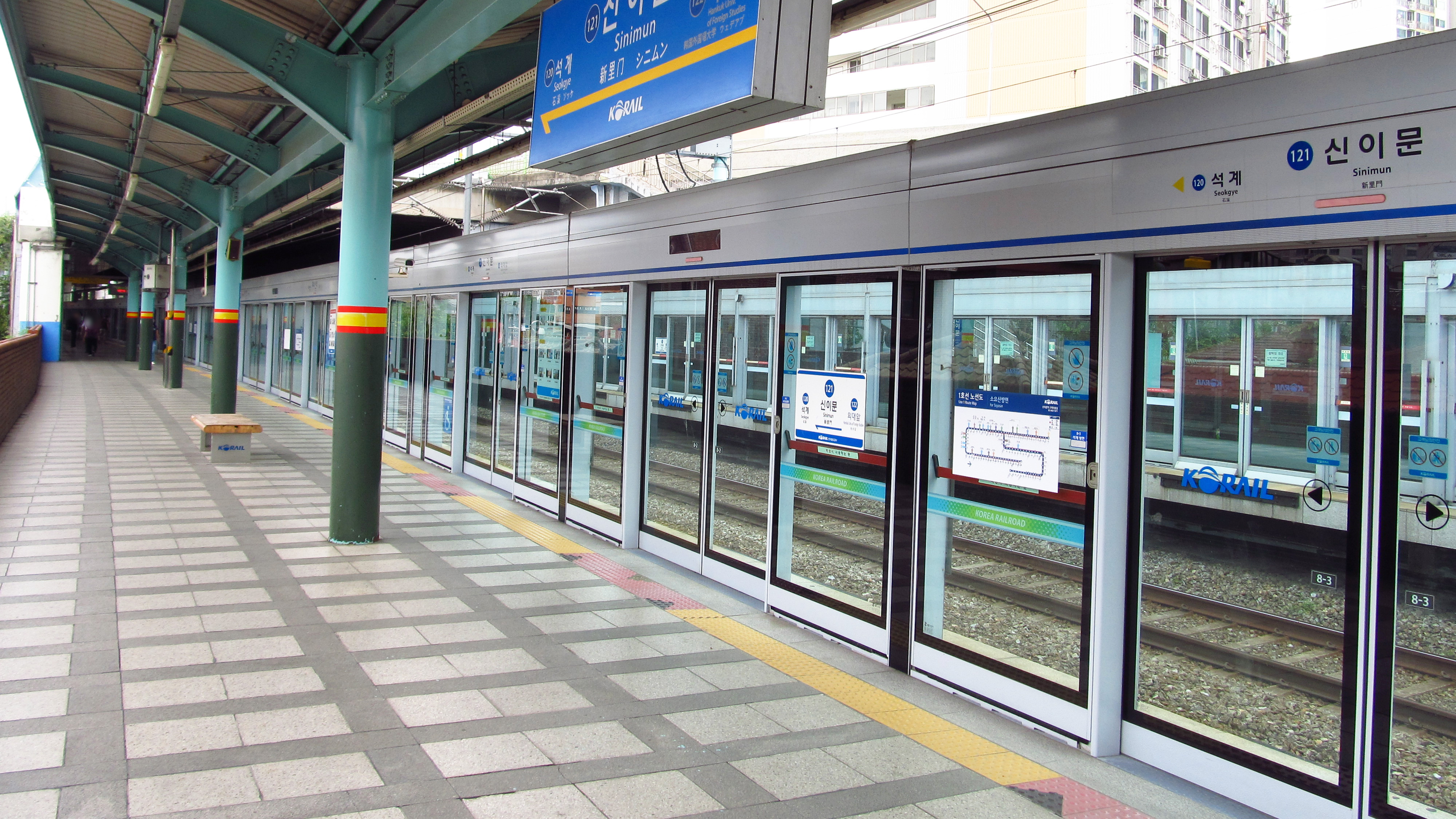
Station platform
