= Seokgye station =

Train station in South Korea

| 석계; Seokgye |
| 석계; Seokgye |
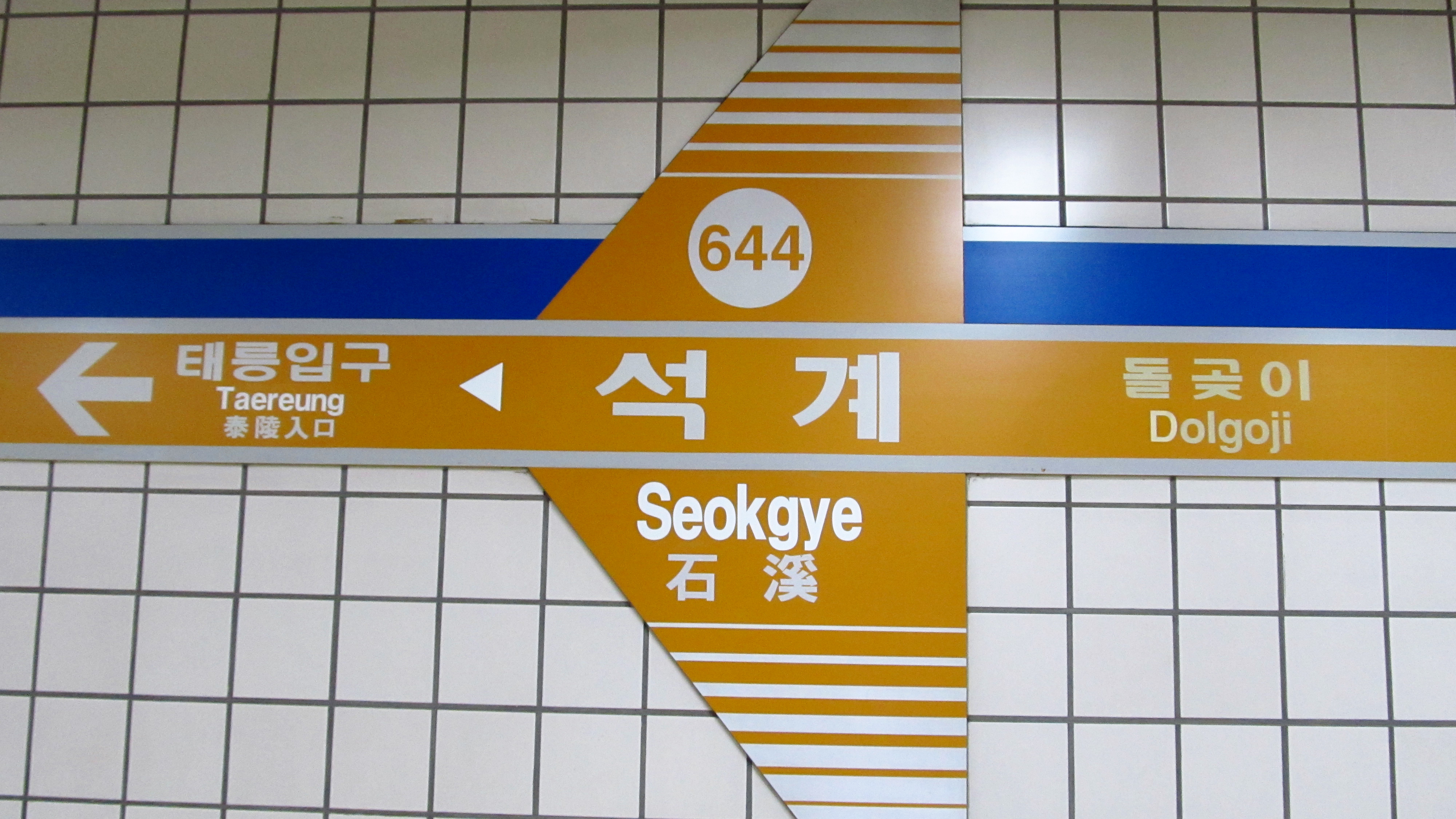
- Station nameplate (Line 6)

Korean name
- Hangul: 석계역
- Hanja: 石溪驛
- Revised Romanization: Seokgye-yeok
- McCune–Reischauer: Sŏkkye-yŏk

General information
- Location: 36-4 Wolgye-dong, 341 Hwarangno, 25-4 Wolgye-dong, Nowon-gu, Seoul; South Korea Nowon-gu, Seoul
- Coordinates: 37°36′53″N 127°03′55″E
- Operator: Korail; Seoul Metro
- Line: Gyeongwon Line
- Platforms: 1; 2
- Tracks: 2

Construction
- Structure type: Aboveground; Underground

History
- Opened: January 14, 1985; August 7, 2000
Location

Seokgye Station is a station on Seoul Subway Line 1 and Line 6. The name of this station does not refer to any one neighborhood in this area; its name comes from an acronym of Seokgwan-dong and Wolgye-dong, located in Seongbuk-gu and Nowon-gu, respectively.

| Preceding station | Seoul Metropolitan Subway | Following station |
|---|---|---|
| Kwangwoon University towards Yeoncheon | Line 1 | Sinimun towards Incheon |
| Kwangwoon University Terminus | Line 1 | Sinimun towards Sinchang or Seodongtan |
| Kwangwoon University towards Dongducheon | Line 1 Gyeongwon Express | Sinimun towards Incheon |
| Dolgoji towards Eungam | Line 6 | Taereung towards Sinnae |
