= Jungnang station =

Train station in South Korea

중랑; Jungnang
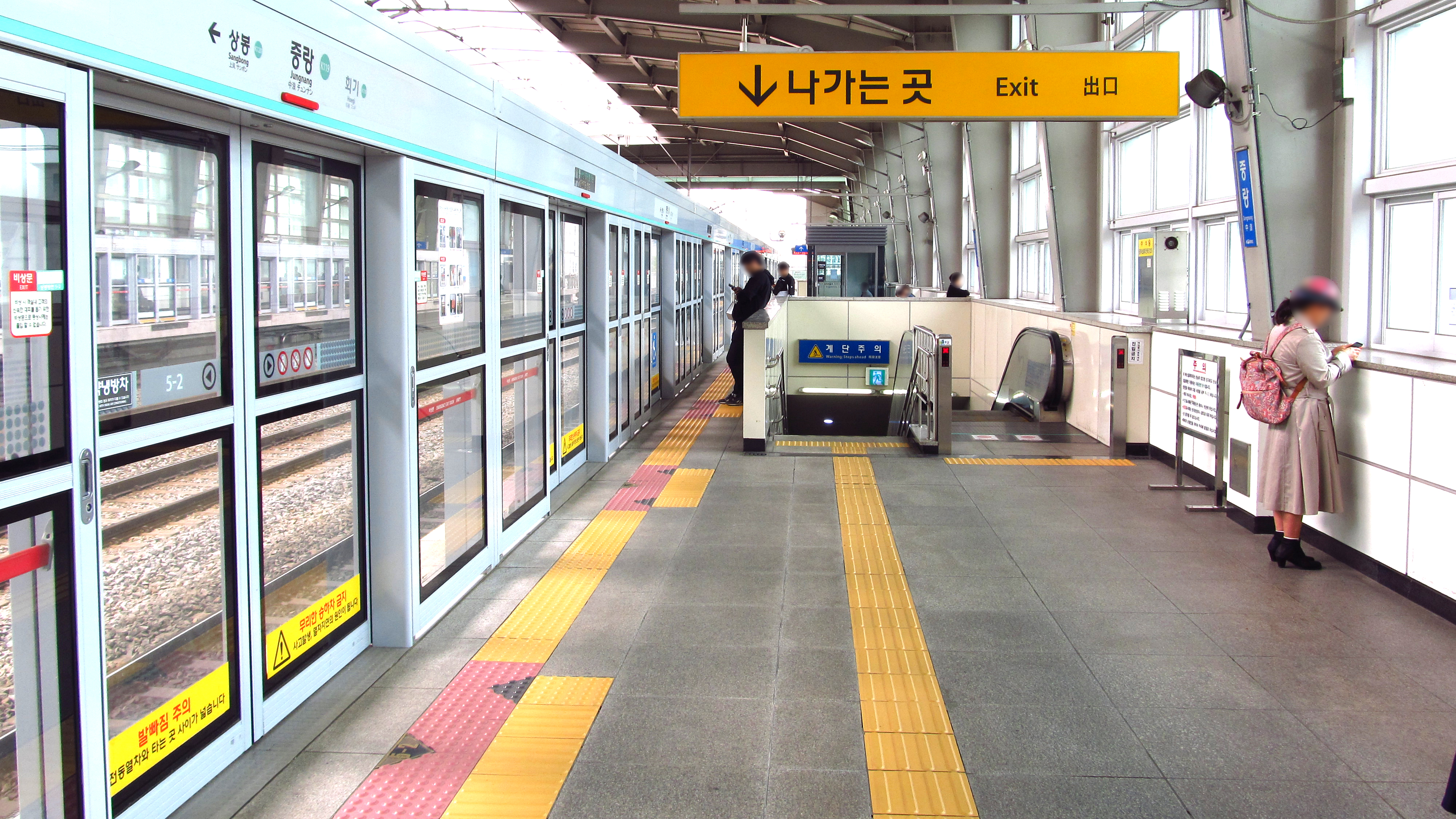

Korean name
- Hangul: 중랑역
- Hanja: 中浪驛
- Revised Romanization: Jungnangnyeok
- McCune–Reischauer: Chungnangnyŏk

General information
- Location: 73-7 Junghwa 2-dong, 9 Jungnangyeongno, Jungnang-gu, Seoul
- Coordinates: 37°35′42″N 127°04′36″E
- Operator: Korail
- Lines: Gyeongui–Jungang Line; Gyeongchun Line
- Platforms: 2
- Tracks: 2

Construction
- Structure type: Aboveground

Key dates
- December 16, 2005: Gyeongui–Jungang Line opened
- September 26, 2016: Gyeongchun Line opened

Services
Preceding station	Seoul Metropolitan Subway	Following station
Hoegi towards Munsan	Gyeongui–Jungang Line	Sangbong towards Jipyeong
Hoegi towards Munsan	Gyeongui–Jungang Line Gyeongui Express	Sangbong towards Yongmun
Hoegi towards Cheongnyangni	Gyeongchun Line	Sangbong towards Chuncheon
Location

Jungnang Station is a station on the Gyeongui–Jungang Line and the Gyeongchun Line. This station was given this name because the Jungnang River, a tributary of the Han River, flows to the west of this station, and also because it is located in the Jungnang-gu district.
