= Dolgoji station =

Metro station in South Korea

돌곶이; Dolgoji
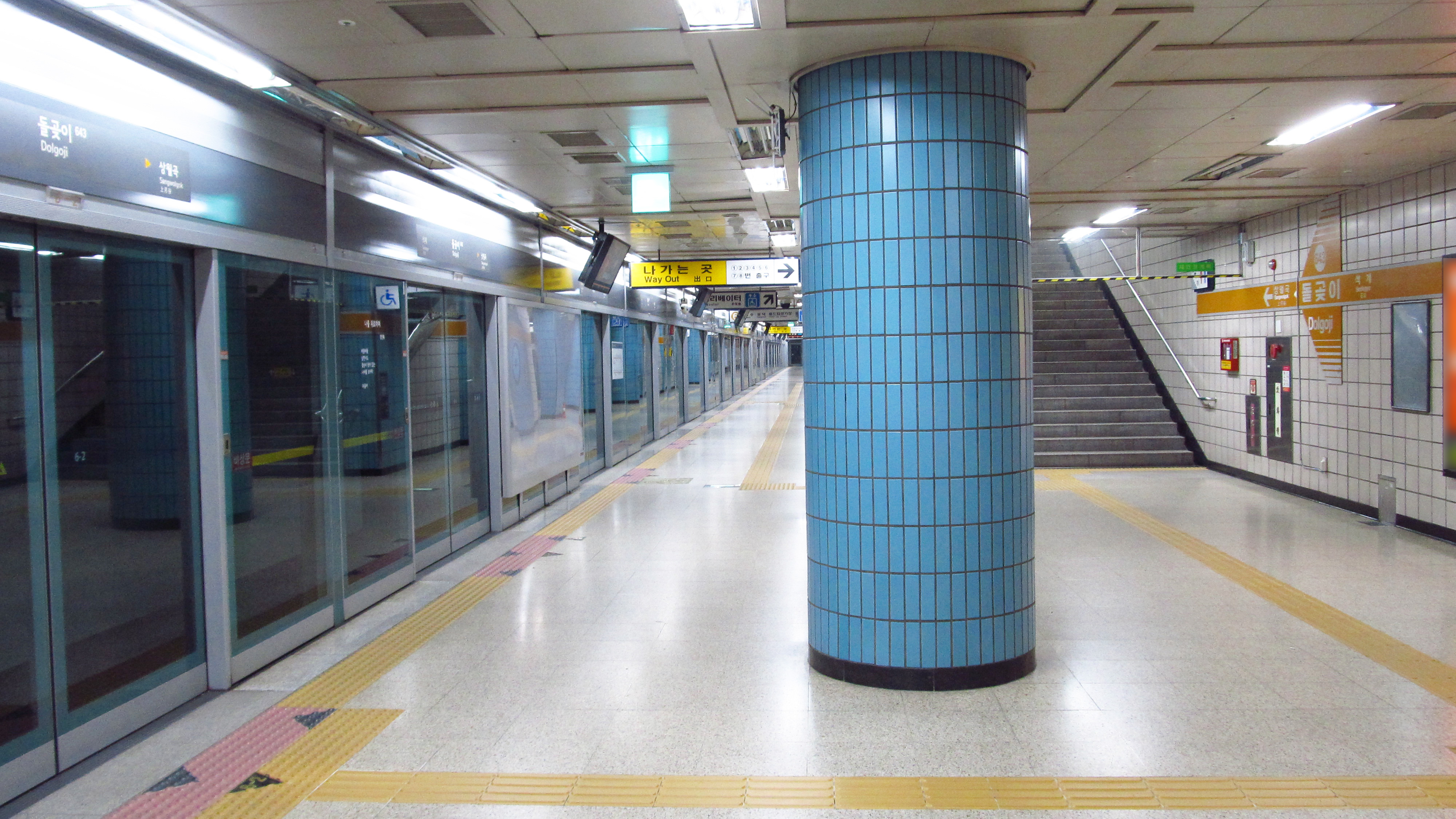

Korean name
- Hangul: 돌곶이역
- Hanja: 돌곶이驛
- Revised Romanization: Dolgoji-yeok
- McCune–Reischauer: Tolgoji-yŏk

General information
- Location: 349-8 Seokgwan-dong, 245 Hwarangno, Seongbuk-gu, Seoul
- Coordinates: 37°36′38″N 127°03′23″E
- Operated by: Seoul Metro
- Line(s): Line 6
- Platforms: 2
- Tracks: 2

Construction
- Structure type: Underground

Key dates
- August 7, 2000: Line 6 opened

Dolgoji Station is a railway station on Seoul Subway Line 6, located in Seongbuk District, Seoul. Its name comes from the hangeul reading of the hanja name (石串) of Seokgwan-dong.

== Station layout ==
G	Street level	Exit

L1; Concourse	Lobby	Customer Service, Shops, Vending machines, ATMs

L2; Platform level	Side platform, doors will open on the right
L2; Platform level	Westbound	← Line 6 toward Eungam (Sangwolgok)
L2; Platform level	Eastbound	Line 6 toward Sinnae (Seokgye) →
L2; Platform level	Side platform, doors will open on the right

Preceding station	Seoul Metropolitan Subway	Following station
Sangwolgok towards Eungam	Line 6	Seokgye towards Sinnae
