= Amsa History Park station =

Station of the Seoul Metropolitan Subway

암사역사공원; Amsa History Park
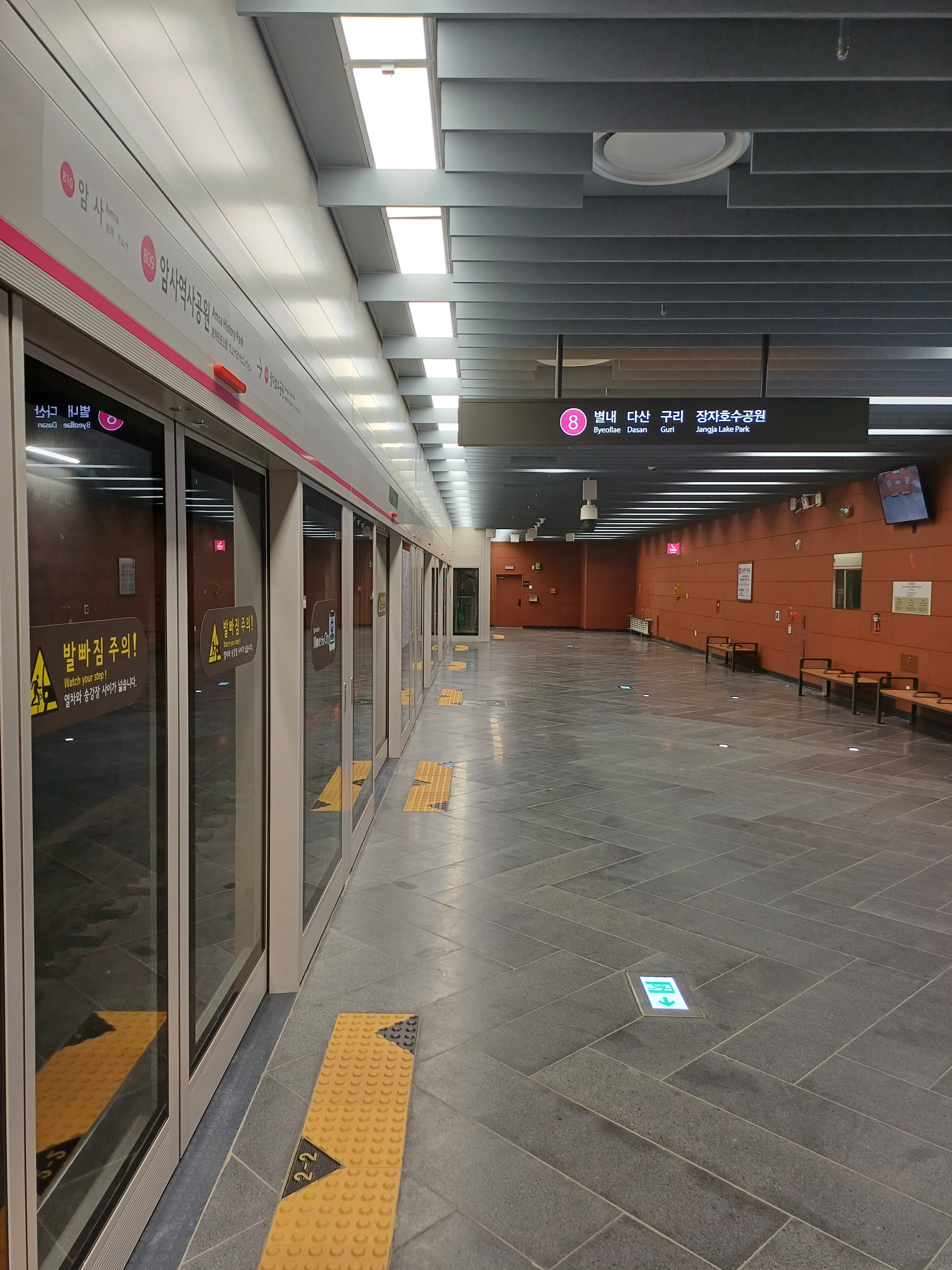
- Amsa History Park station's platform

Korean name
- Hangul: 암사역사공원역
- Hanja: 岩寺歷史公園驛
- RR: Amsa yeoksa gongwon-yeok
- MR: Amsa yŏksa kongwŏn-yŏk

General information
- Location: Amsa-dong, Gangdong District, Seoul
- Coordinates: 37.55679°N 127.13578°E
- Operated by: Seoul Metro
- Line: Line 8
- Platforms: 2
- Tracks: 2

Construction
- Structure type: Underground

Key dates
- August 10, 2024: Line 8 opened
Location

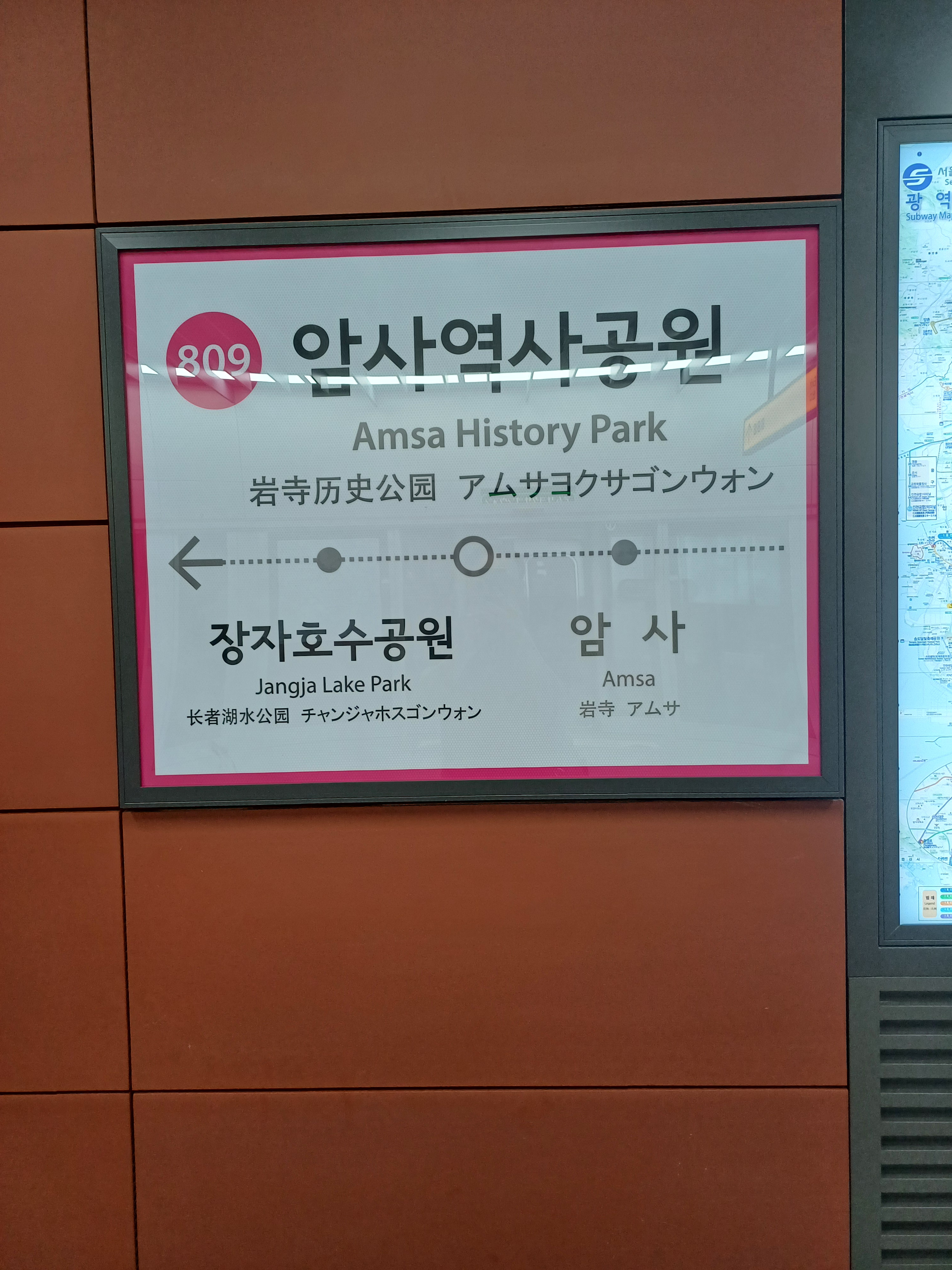
Amsa History Park station's nameplate

Amsa History Park station (Korean: 암사역사공원) is a subway station on Line 8 of the Seoul Metropolitan Subway system.

== History ==
- August 10, 2024 - Opened for service as part of the extension of Line 8 from Amsa to Byeollae.

== Station layout ==
Jangja Lake Park ↑
S/B | | N/B
↓ Amsa

Northbound	← ● Line 8 toward Byeollae
Southbound	● Line 8 toward Moran →

Preceding station	Seoul Metropolitan Subway	Following station
Jangja Lake Park towards Byeollae	Line 8	Amsa towards Moran
