= Hankuk University of Foreign Studies station =

Metro station in Seoul, South Korea

외대앞; Hankuk Univ. of Foreign Studies
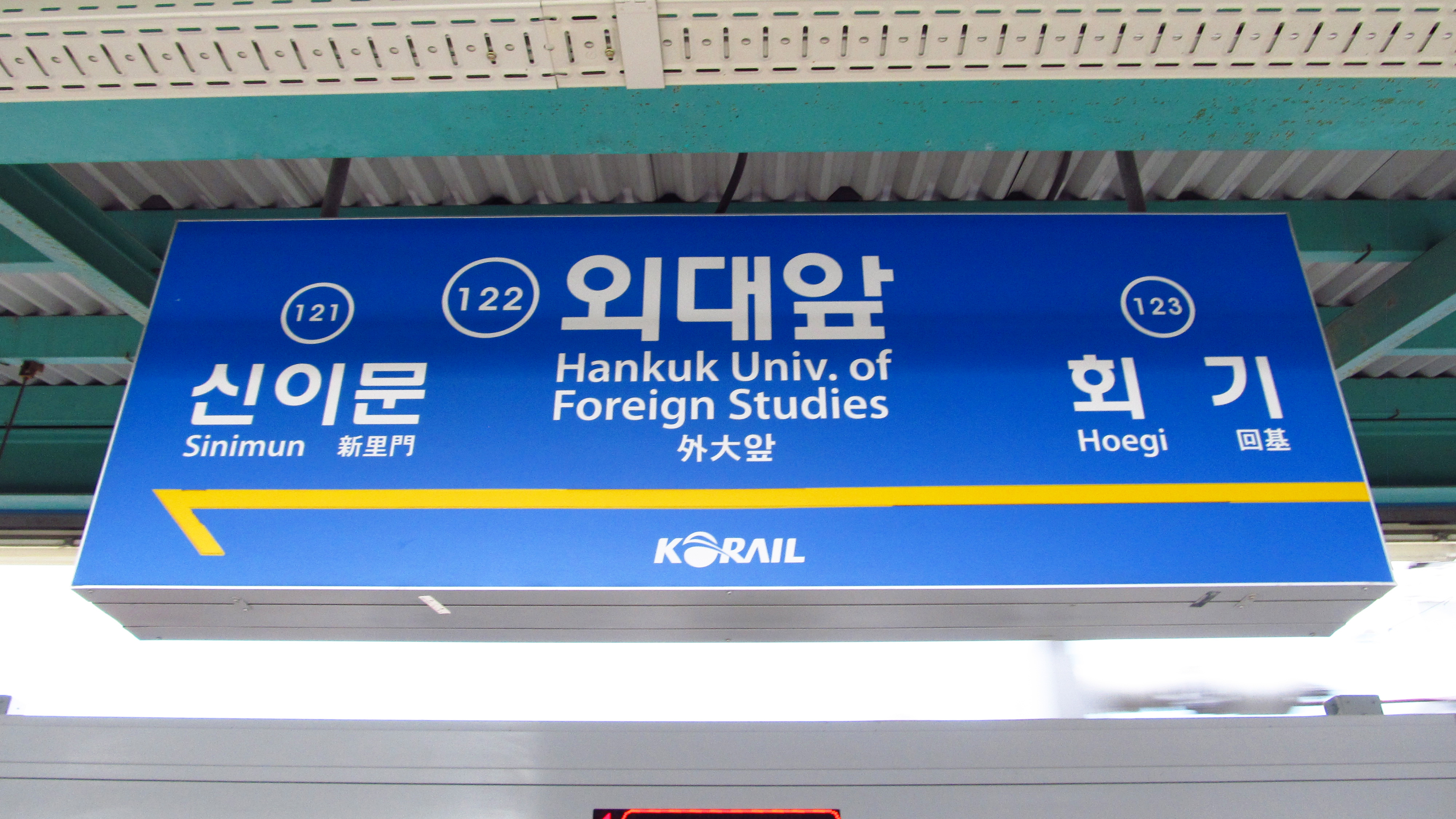
- Station Sign

Korean name
- Hangul: 외대앞역
- Hanja: 外大앞驛
- Revised Romanization: Oedaeap-yeok
- McCune–Reischauer: Oedaeap-yŏk

General information
- Location: 360-5 Imun-dong, 27 Hwigyeongno, Dongdaemun-gu, Seoul; South Korea
- Coordinates: 37°35′42″N 127°03′46″E
- Operator: Korail
- Line: Gyeongwon Line
- Platforms: 2
- Tracks: 2

Construction
- Structure type: Aboveground

History
- Opened: August 15, 1974

Passengers
- Based on Jan-Dec of 2012. Line 1: 26,504
Services
Preceding station	Seoul Metropolitan Subway	Following station
Sinimun towards Kwangwoon University or Yeoncheon	Line 1	Hoegi towards Incheon, Seodongtan or Sinchang
Sinimun towards Dongducheon	Line 1 Gyeongwon Express	Hoegi towards Incheon
Location

Hankuk University of Foreign Studies Station is a station on Line 1 of the Gyeongwon Line.

The original name of this station was Hwigyeong Station (휘경역; 徽慶驛), although this station is located in Imun 1-dong. Because Hoegi Station (Preceding station) is located in Hwigyeong-dong, in 1996, the name of this station was changed to Hankuk University of Foreign Studies Station, after a nearby eponymous university. Originally the station was built on a 4-way crossroad layout. However in 2012, due to a series of accidents and safety concerns, a tunnel was built under the track for road traffic alongside an above ground pedestrian walkway. Despite this, the ground level crossing remains to this day.

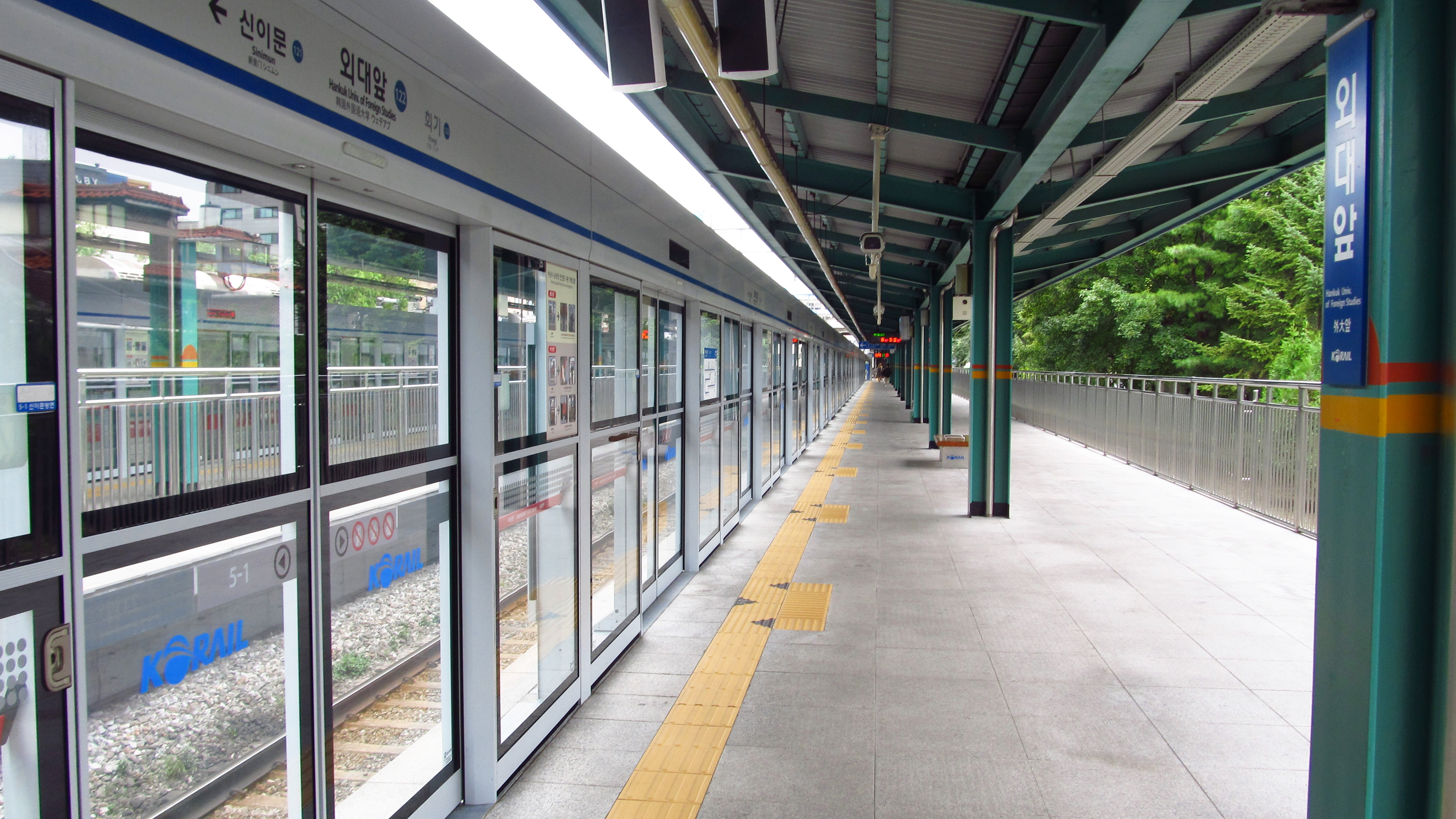
Station platform

== Vicinity ==
- Exit 1: Hankuk University of Foreign Studies
- Exit 2: Igyeong Market
