= Hoegi station =

Train station in South Korea

회기; Hoegi
회기; Hoegi
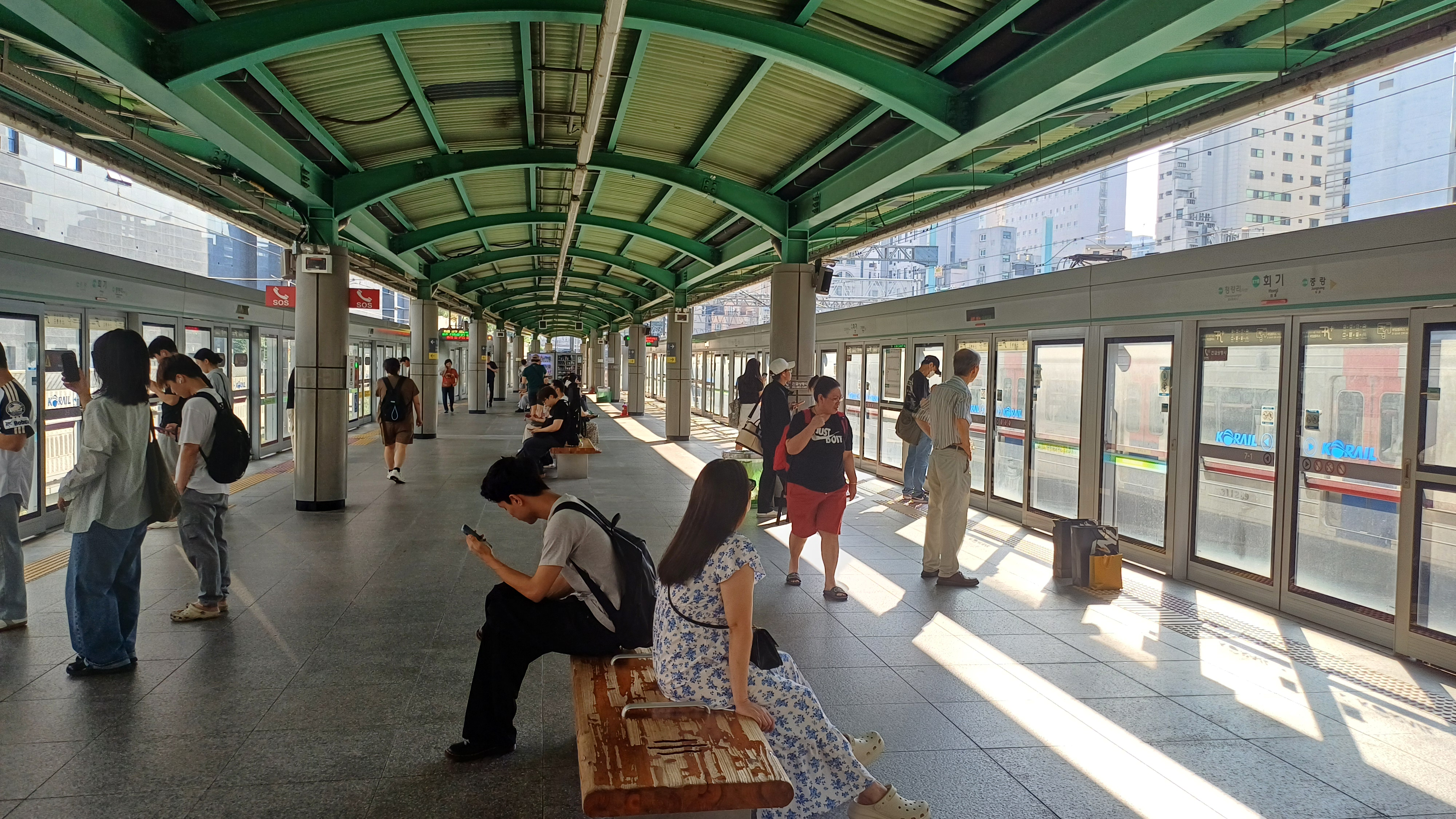
- Gyeongui-Jungang Line and Gyeongchun Line platforms

Korean name
- Hangul: 회기역
- Hanja: 回基驛
- Revised Romanization: Hoegi-yeok
- McCune–Reischauer: Hoegi-yŏk

General information
- Location: 317-101 Hwigyeong-dong, 196 Hoegiro, Dongdaemun-gu, Seoul; South Korea
- Coordinates: 37°35′21″N 127°03′26″E
- Operator: Korail
- Line: Gyeongwon Line
- Platforms: 2
- Tracks: 4

Construction
- Structure type: Aboveground

History
- Opened: April 1, 1980

Key dates
- April 1, 1980: Line 1 opened
- December 16, 2005: Gyeongui–Jungang Line opened
- September 26, 2016: Gyeongchun Line opened

Passengers
- Based on Jan-Dec of 2012. Line 1: 59,145
Services
Preceding station	Seoul Metropolitan Subway	Following station
Hankuk University of Foreign Studies towards Kwangwoon University or Yeoncheon	Line 1	Cheongnyangni towards Incheon, Seodongtan or Sinchang
Hankuk University of Foreign Studies towards Dongducheon	Line 1 Gyeongwon Express	Cheongnyangni towards Incheon
Cheongnyangni towards Munsan	Gyeongui–Jungang Line	Jungnang towards Jipyeong
Cheongnyangni towards Munsan	Gyeongui–Jungang Line Gyeongui Express	Jungnang towards Yongmun
Cheongnyangni towards Munsan	Gyeongui–Jungang Line Jungang Express	Sangbong towards Yongmun
Cheongnyangni Terminus	Gyeongchun Line	Jungnang towards Chuncheon
Cheongnyangni Terminus	Gyeongchun Line Express	Sangbong towards Chuncheon
Location

Hoegi Station is a station on Seoul Subway Line 1, the Gyeongchun Line and the Gyeongui–Jungang Line. The two island platforms are side-by-side with each other, and are connected by an overpass. This is the closest station to Kyung Hee University, located northwest of here.
