= Yangwon station =

Station of the Seoul Metropolitan Subway

양원; Yangwon
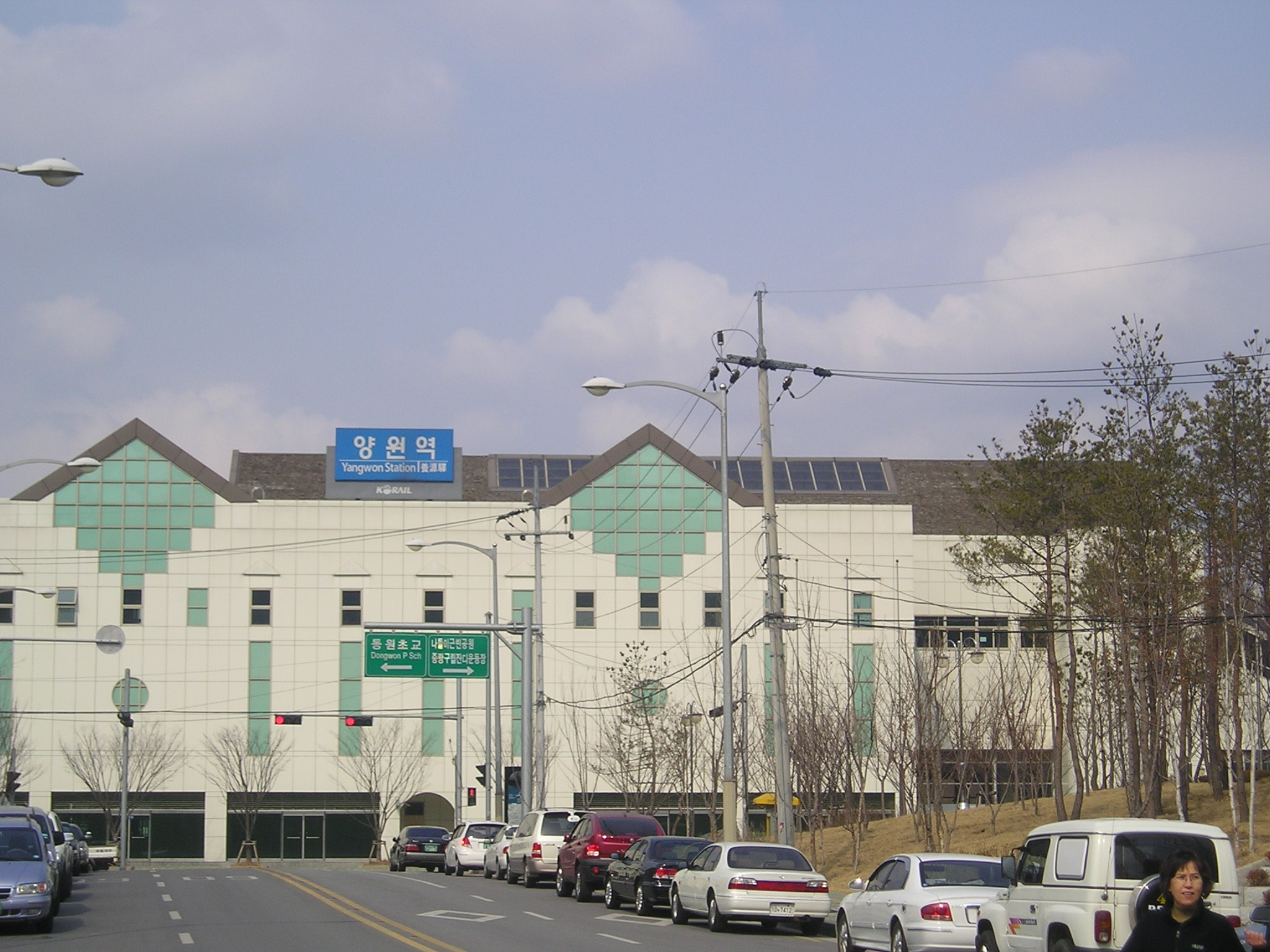

Korean name
- Hangul: 양원역
- Hanja: 養源驛
- Revised Romanization: Yangwonnyeok
- McCune–Reischauer: Yangwŏnnyŏk

General information
- Location: 269-5 Mangubon-dong, Jungnang-gu, Seoul
- Coordinates: 37°36′24″N 127°06′28″E
- Operator: Korail
- Line: Gyeongui–Jungang Line
- Platforms: 2
- Tracks: 2

Construction
- Structure type: Aboveground

Key dates
- December 16, 2005: Gyeongui–Jungang Line opened
Location

Yangwon station is a station on the Gyeongui–Jungang Line. Geographically, it is the easternmost train/metro station in Seoul north of the Han River.

Preceding station	Seoul Metropolitan Subway	Following station
Mangu towards Munsan	Gyeongui–Jungang Line	Guri towards Jipyeong
Mangu towards Munsan	Gyeongui–Jungang Line Gyeongui Express	Guri towards Yongmun
