= Sangbong-dong =

- Country: South Korea

Area
  - Total: 1.53 km^{2} (0.59 sq mi)

Population (2001)
  - Total: 42,475
  - Density: 27,800/km^{2} (71,900/sq mi)

Korean name
- Hangul: 상봉동
- Hanja: 上鳳洞
- RR: Sangbong-dong
- MR: Sangbong-dong

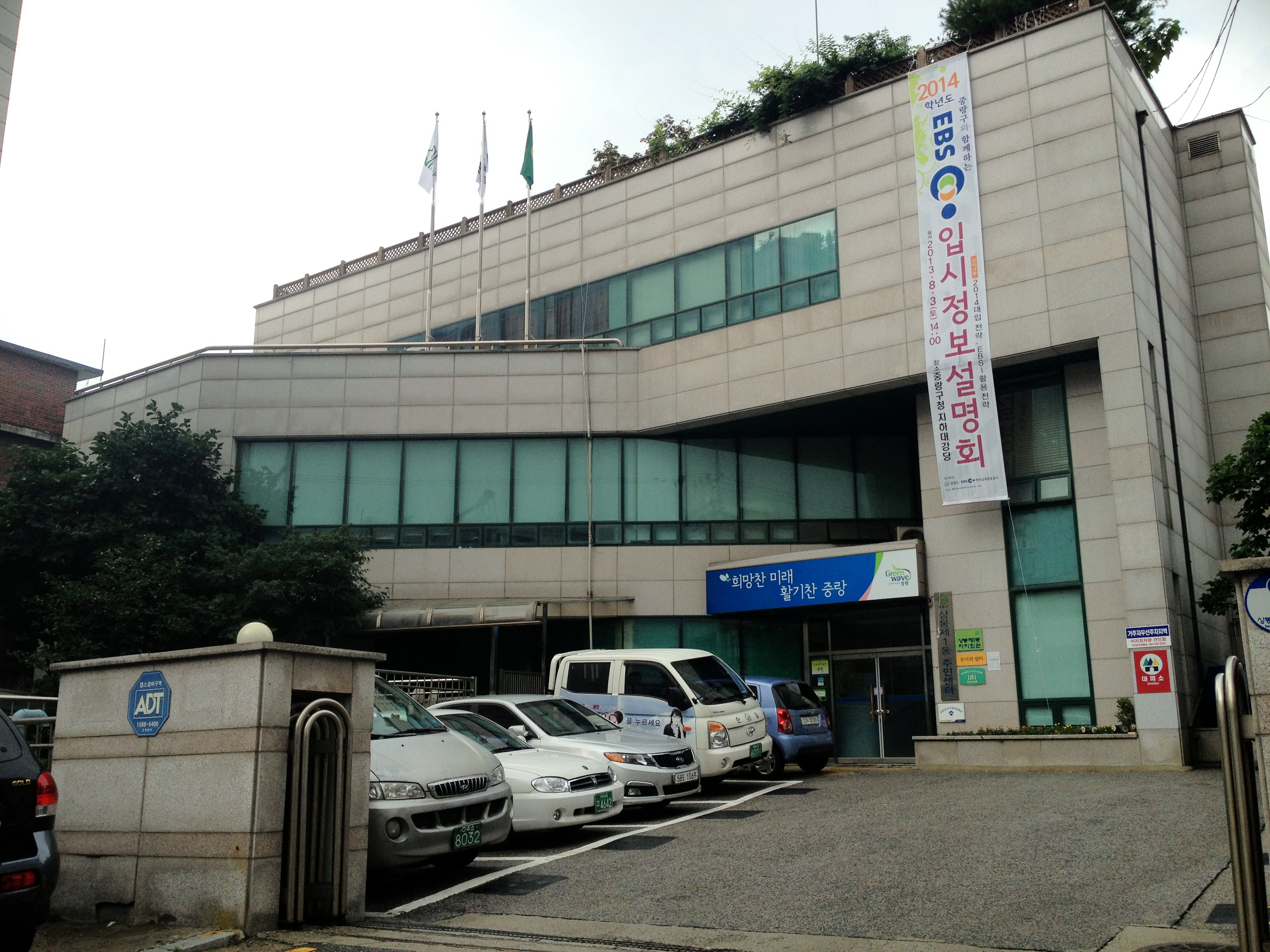
Sangbong 1-dong Comunity Service Center (Jungnang-gu)

Sangbong-dong (Korean: 상봉동) is a dong (neighbourhood) of Jungnang District, Seoul, South Korea.

== See also ==
- Administrative divisions of South Korea
