= Amsa station =

Station of the Seoul Metropolitan Subway

Coordinates: 37°33′00″N 127°07′39″E

| 암사; Amsa |
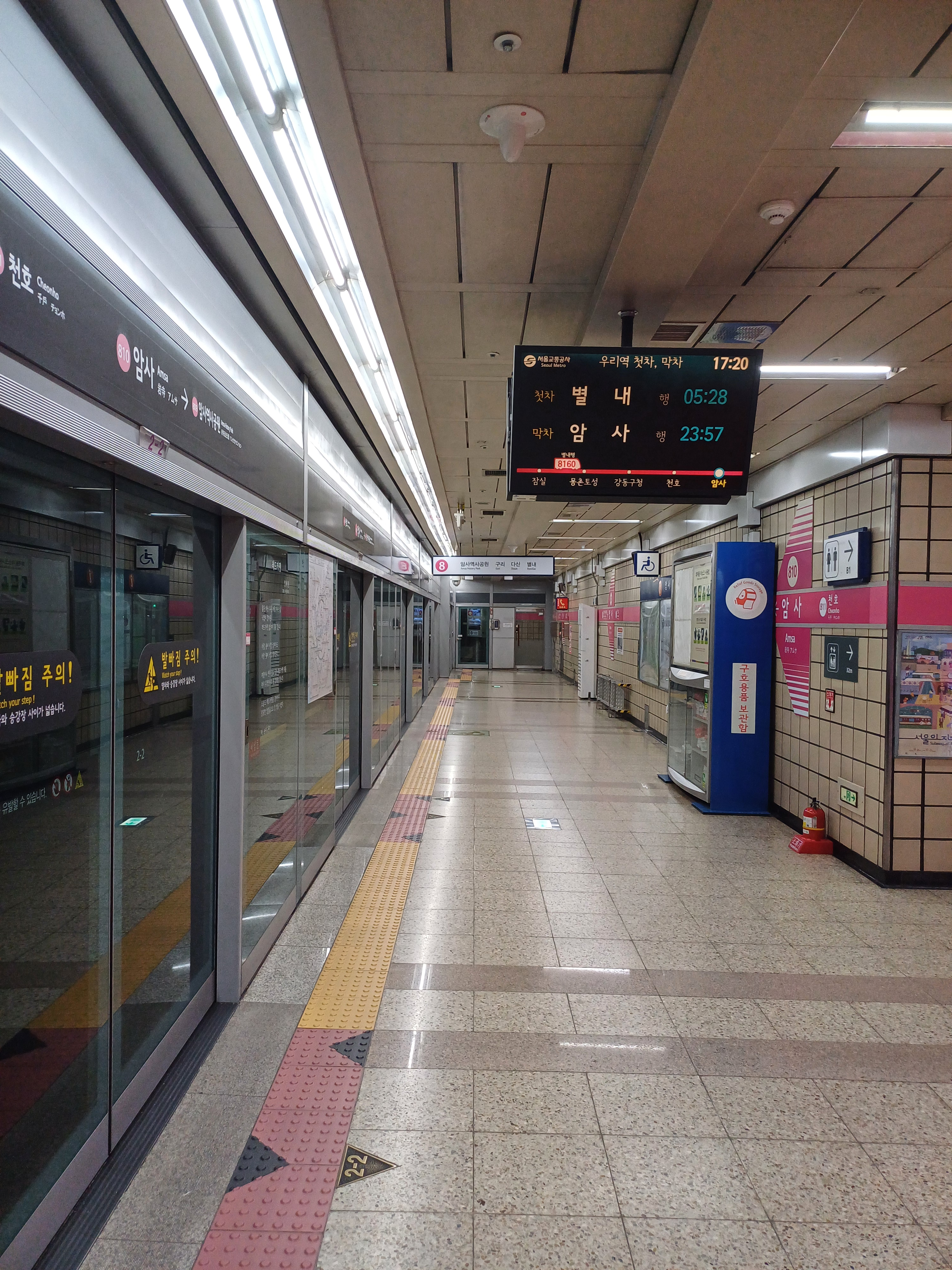
- Station platform

Korean name
- Hangul: 암사역
- Hanja: 岩寺驛
- RR: Amsa-yeok
- MR: Amsa-yŏk

General information
- Location: Ollimpikno Jiha 776, Gangdong District, Seoul
- Operator: Seoul Metro
- Line: Line 8
- Platforms: 2
- Tracks: 2

Construction
- Structure type: Underground

Key dates
- July 2, 1999: Line 8 opened
Location

Amsa station (Korean: 암사; Hanja: 岩寺) is a subway station on Line 8 of the Seoul Metropolitan Subway. The station is located in the Amsa and Cheonho neighborhoods in Gangdong District, Seoul. The station used to be Northern terminus of the line and is approximately 31 minutes by train from Moran station. In August 2024, the line was extended to Byeollae.

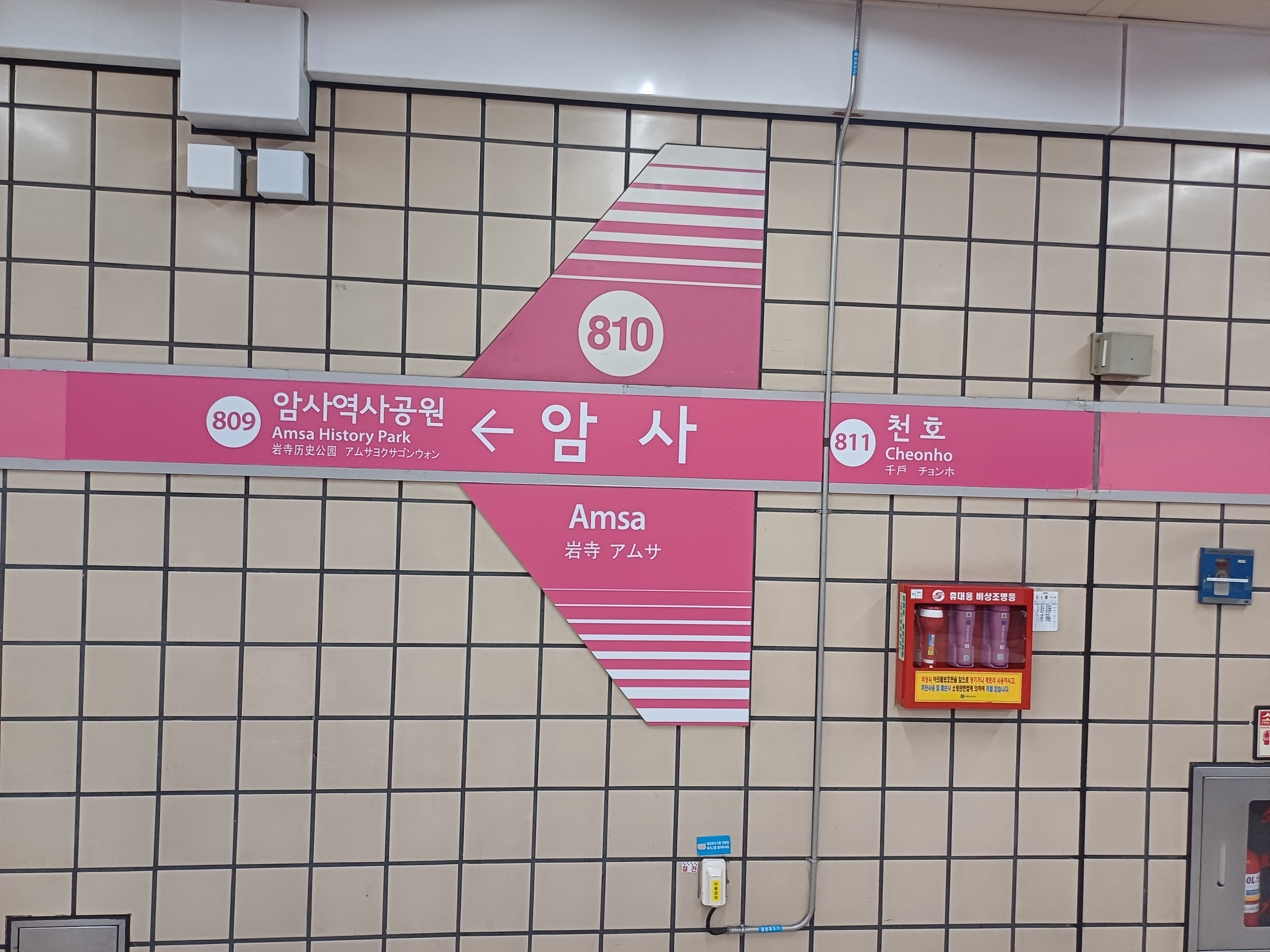
Station nameplate

== History ==
- July 2, 1999: Along with the opening of Seoul Subway Line 8, operations began as the terminus of the line.
- August 2, 2024: Line 8 is extended from this station to Byeollae.

== Station layout ==
Amsa History Park ↑
S/B | | N/B
↓ Cheonho

| Northbound | ← ● Line 8 toward Byeollae |
| Southbound | ● Line 8 toward Moran → |

| Preceding station | Seoul Metropolitan Subway | Following station |
|---|---|---|
| Amsa History Park towards Byeollae | Line 8 | Cheonho towards Moran |
