= Yangpyeong station =

Yangpyeong station (Korean: 양평역) is a railroad station in South Korea.

- Yangpyeong station (Seoul)
- Yangpyeong station (Yangpyeong)
