= Donong station =

Train station in South Korea

도농; Donong
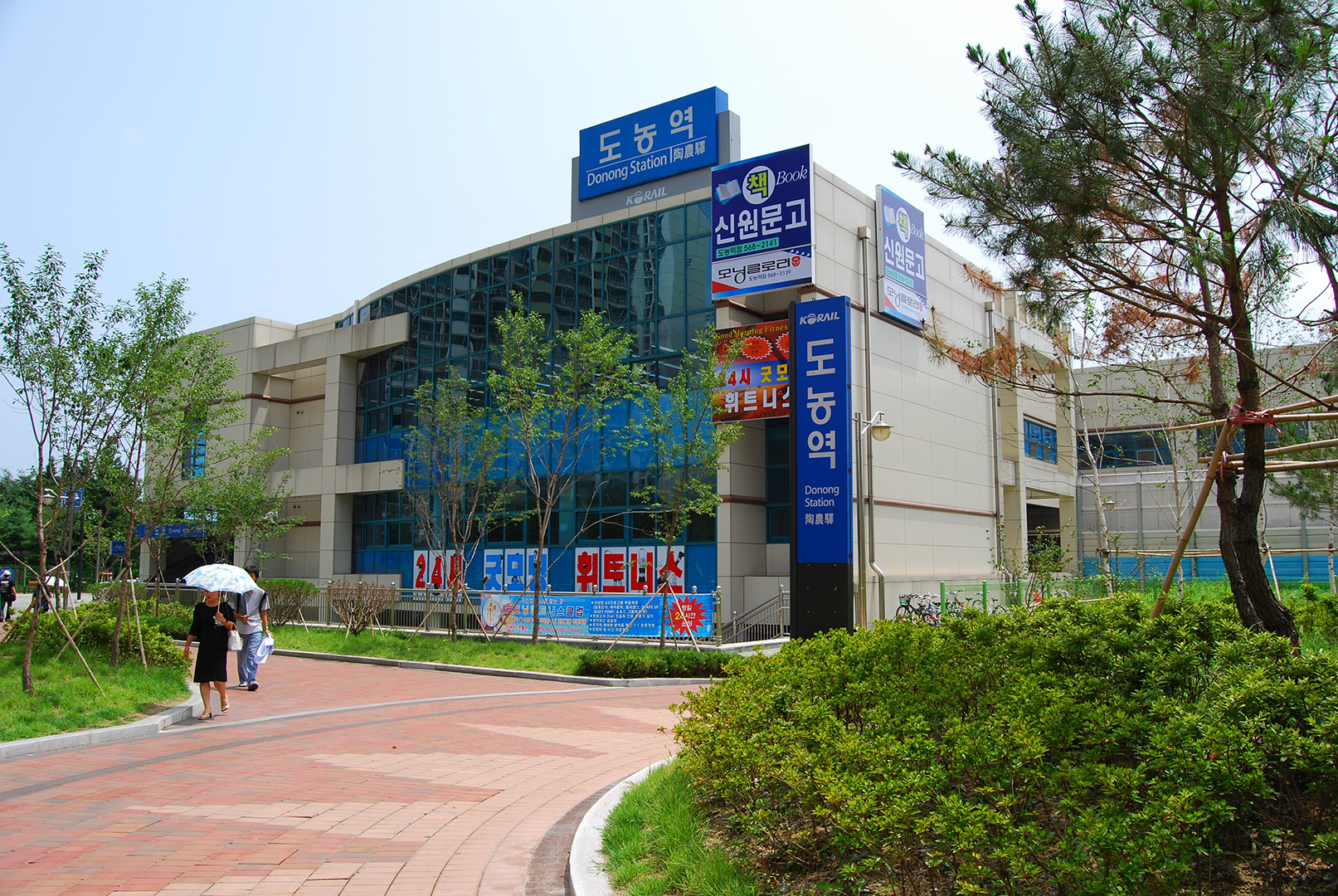

Korean name
- Hangul: 도농역
- Hanja: 陶農驛
- Revised Romanization: Donong-yeok
- McCune–Reischauer: Tonong-yŏk

General information
- Location: 4056-1 Dasan-dong, 433 Gyeongchun-ro, Namyangju-si, Gyeonggi-do
- Coordinates: 37°36′30″N 127°09′40″E
- Operator: Korail
- Line: Gyeongui–Jungang Line
- Platforms: 2
- Tracks: 4

Construction
- Structure type: Aboveground

History
- Opened: April 1, 1939

Key dates
- December 16, 2005: Gyeongui–Jungang Line opened
Location

Donong station is a train station on the Gyeongui–Jungang Line.

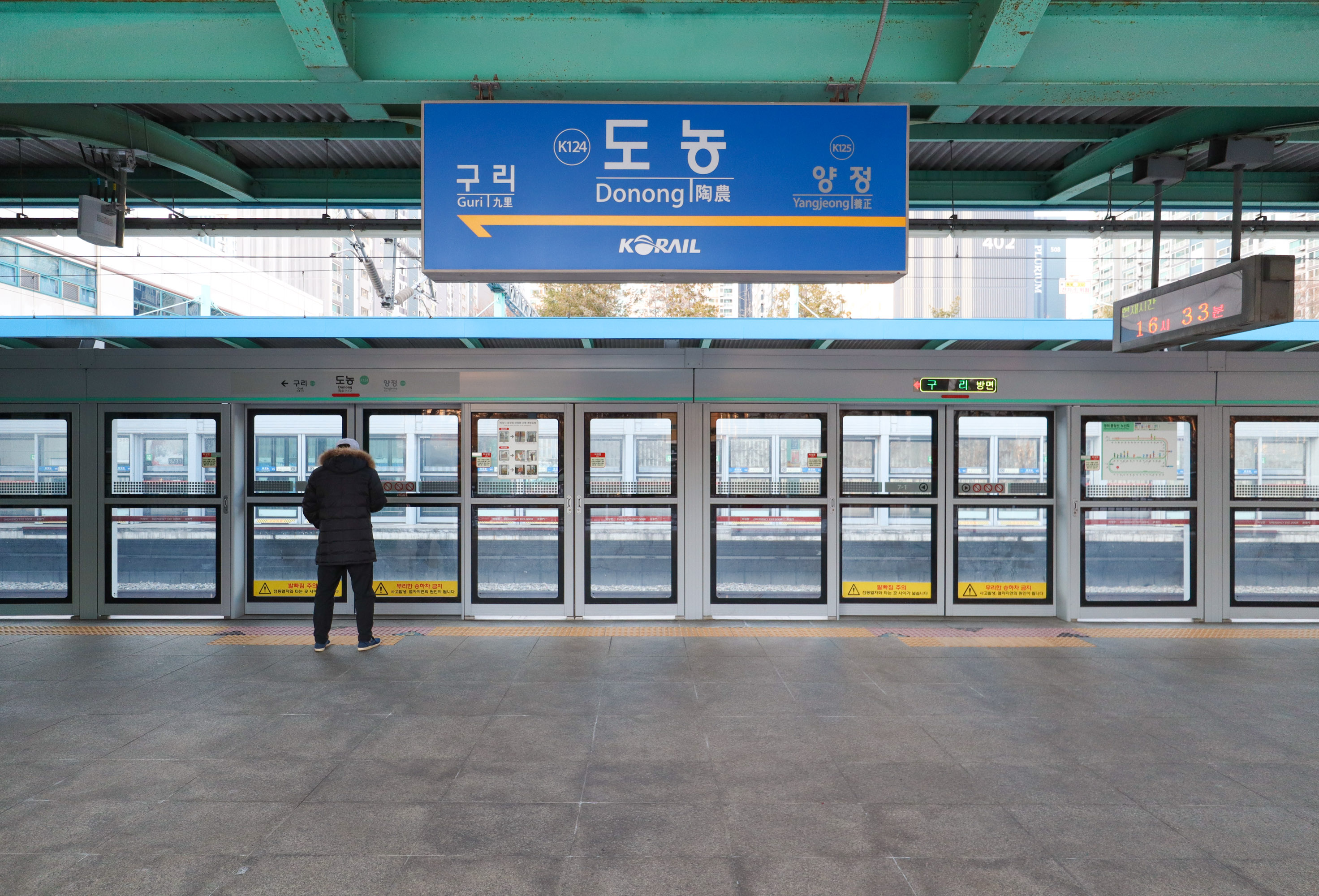

Preceding station	Seoul Metropolitan Subway	Following station
Guri towards Munsan	Gyeongui–Jungang Line	Yangjeong towards Jipyeong
Guri towards Munsan	Gyeongui–Jungang Line Gyeongui Express	Yangjeong towards Yongmun
Guri towards Munsan	Gyeongui–Jungang Line Jungang Express	Deokso towards Yongmun
