= Obin station =

Train station in South Korea

오빈; Obin
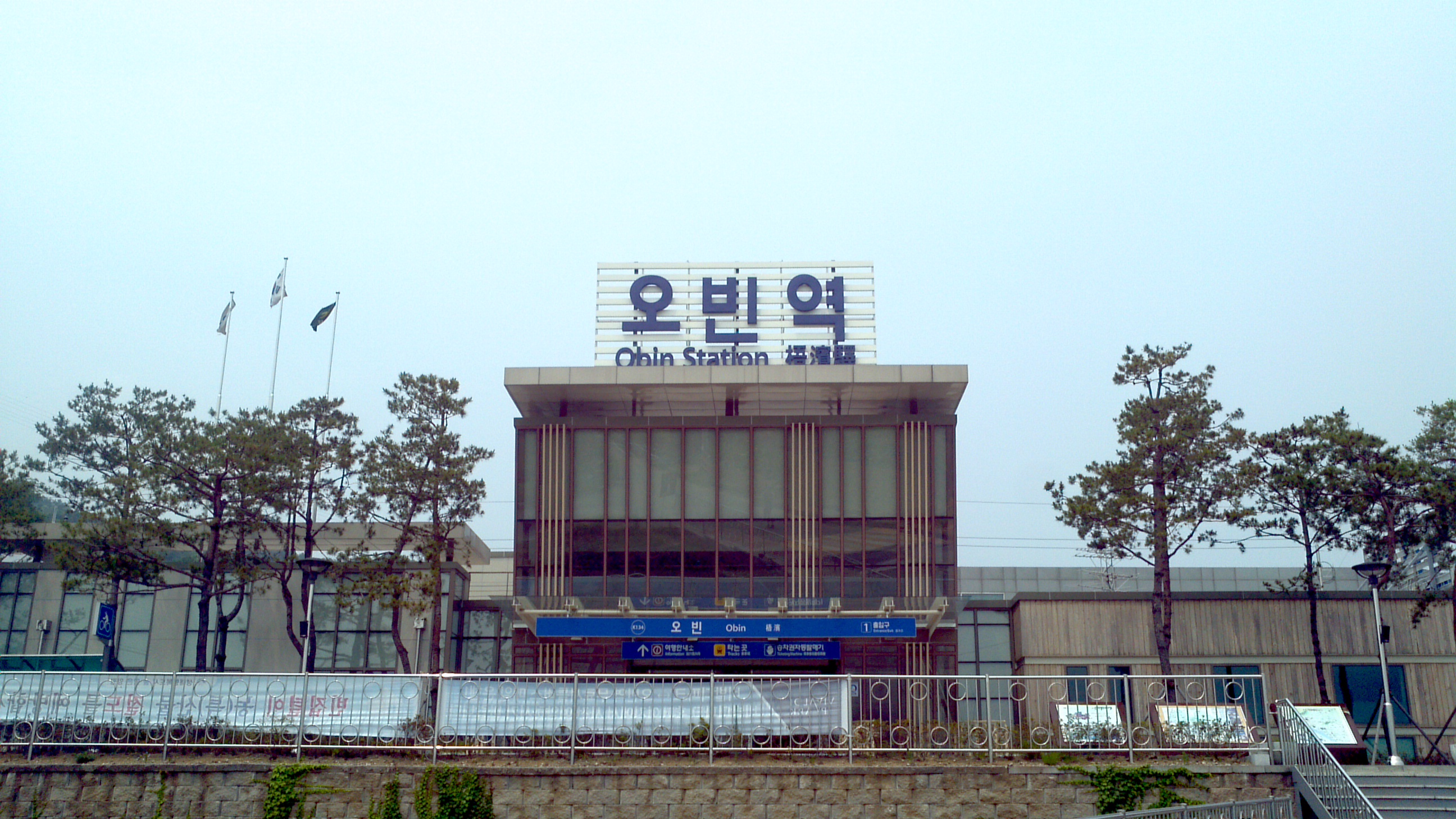

Korean name
- Hangul: 오빈역
- Hanja: 梧濱驛
- Revised Romanization: Obinnyeok
- McCune–Reischauer: Obinnyŏk

General information
- Location: Obin 3-ri, Yangpyeong-eup, Yangpyeong-gun, Gyeonggi-do
- Coordinates: 37°30′22″N 127°28′26″E
- Operator: Korail
- Line: Gyeongui–Jungang Line
- Platforms: 2
- Tracks: 2

Construction
- Structure type: Aboveground

Key dates
- December 21, 2010: Gyeongui–Jungang Line opened
Location

Obin station is a station on the Gyeongui–Jungang Line in South Korea. It opened on 21 December 2010 as an infill station on the Seoul Metropolitan Subway's Jungang Line service, between Asin and Yangpyeong.

Preceding station	Seoul Metropolitan Subway	Following station
Asin towards Munsan	Gyeongui–Jungang Line	Yangpyeong towards Jipyeong
Asin towards Munsan	Gyeongui–Jungang Line Gyeongui Express	Yangpyeong towards Yongmun
