= Deokso station =

Train station in Namyangju, South Korea

덕소
Deokso
덕소; Deokso
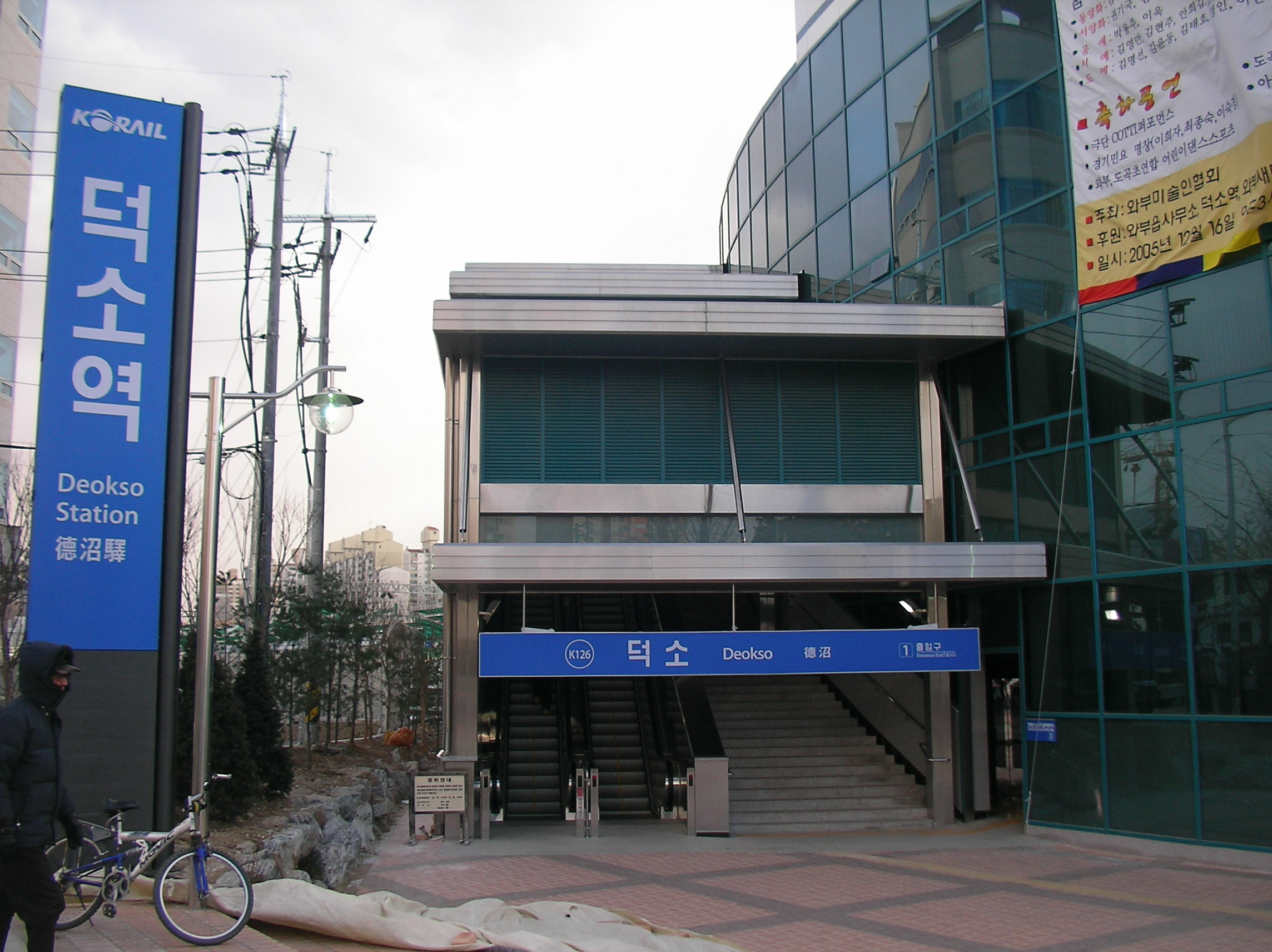

Korean name
- Hangul: 덕소역
- Hanja: 德沼驛
- RR: Deokso-yeok
- MR: Tŏkso-yŏk

General information
- Location: 590-17 Deoksori, 56 Deoksoro, Wabu-eup, Namyangju-si, Gyeonggi-do
- Coordinates: 37°35′11″N 127°12′34″E
- Operator: Korail
- Line: Gyeongui–Jungang Line
- Platforms: 2
- Tracks: 4

Construction
- Structure type: Aboveground

History
- Opened: April 1, 1939

Key dates
- December 16, 2005: Gyeongui–Jungang Line opened
Location

Deokso station is a train station on the Gyeongui–Jungang Line, South Korea. It was the eastern terminus of the Jungang Line commuter rail system prior to the opening of Paldang station, and some trains still travel up to this station, before heading back to Yongsan Station.

Deokso station is located in Deokso, a town east of Seoul and on the north bank of the Han River.

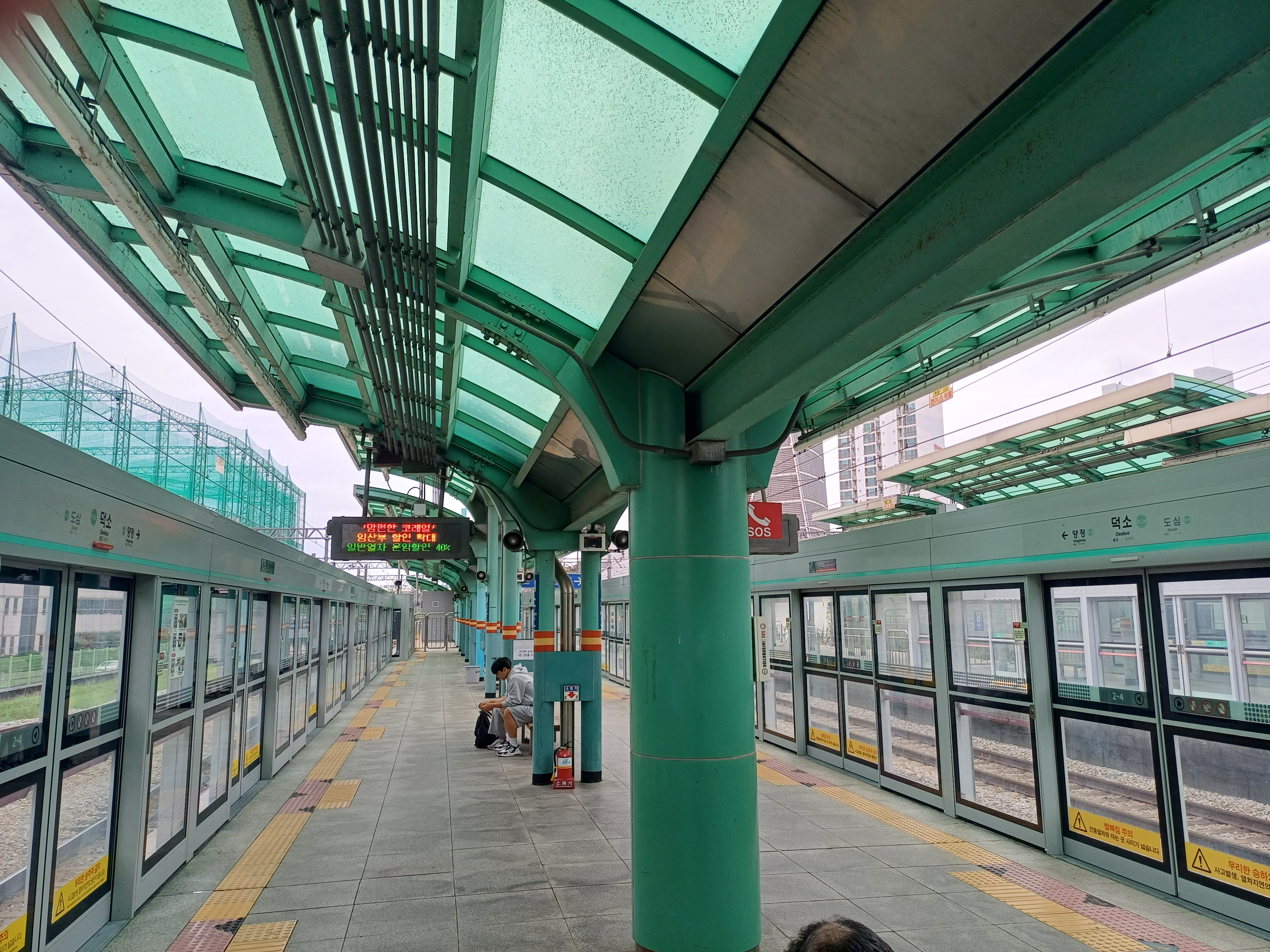

Preceding station	Seoul Metropolitan Subway	Following station
Yangjeong towards Munsan	Gyeongui–Jungang Line	Dosim towards Jipyeong
Yangjeong towards Munsan	Gyeongui–Jungang Line Gyeongui Express	Dosim towards Yongmun
Donong towards Munsan	Gyeongui–Jungang Line Jungang Express	Dosim towards Yongmun
Preceding station	Korea Train Express	Following station
Sangbong towards Haengsin or Seoul	Gangneung KTX	Yangpyeong towards Donghae or Gangneung
Sangbong towards Seoul	Jungang KTX	Yangpyeong towards Bujeon
Preceding station	Korail	Following station
Cheongnyangni Terminus	ITX-Maum Jungang Line	Yangpyeong towards Andong or Bujeon
Cheongnyangni Terminus	Mugunghwa-ho Taebaek Line	Yangpyeong towards Donghae
