= Asin station =

Station of the Seoul Metropolitan Subway

아신; Asin
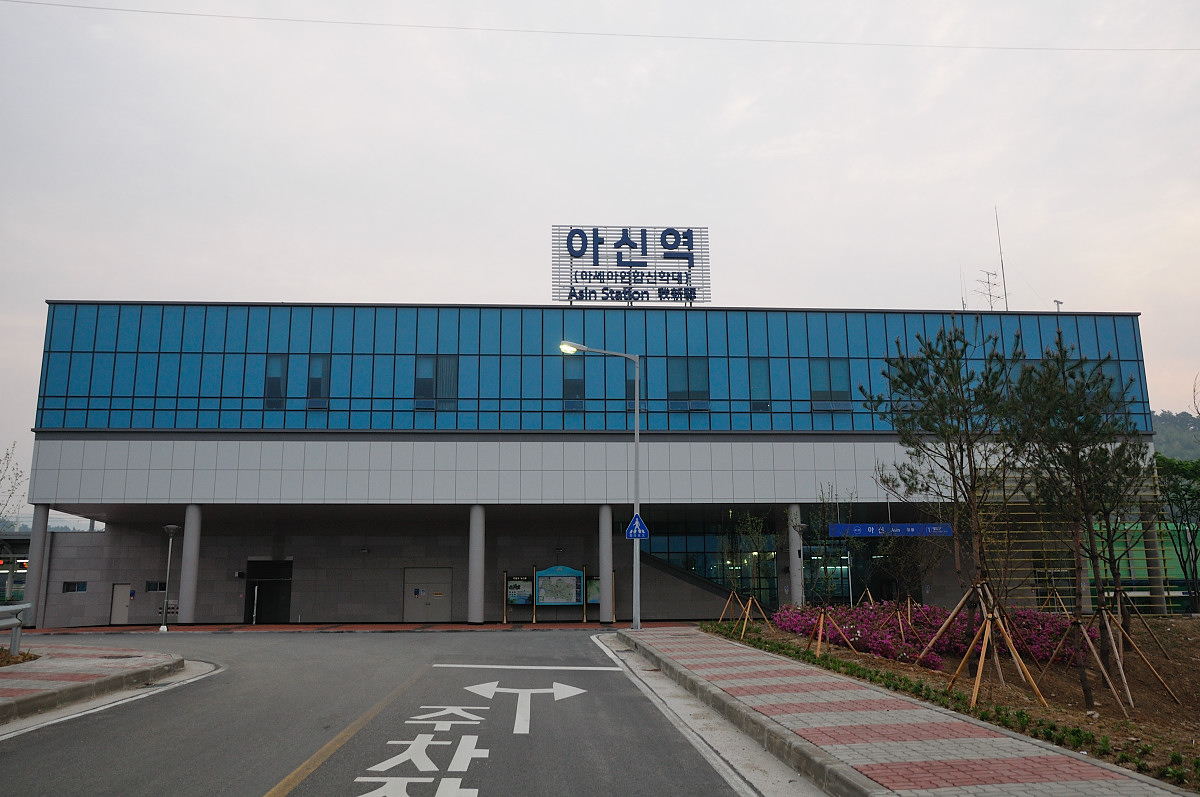

Korean name
- Hangul: 아신역
- Hanja: 我新驛
- RR: Asin-yeok
- MR: Asin-yŏk

General information
- Location: 112-2 Asin 3-ri, 23-3; Asinyeok 1-gil, Okcheon-myeon, Yangpyeong-gun, Gyeonggi-do
- Coordinates: 37°30′50″N 127°26′35″E
- Operator: Korail
- Line: Gyeongui–Jungang Line
- Platforms: 2
- Tracks: 4

Construction
- Structure type: Aboveground

History
- Opened: April 1, 1959

Key dates
- December 23, 2009: Gyeongui–Jungang Line opened
Location

Asin station is a station on the Gyeongui–Jungang Line.

Preceding station	Seoul Metropolitan Subway	Following station
Guksu towards Munsan	Gyeongui–Jungang Line	Obin towards Jipyeong
Guksu towards Munsan	Gyeongui–Jungang Line Gyeongui Express	Obin towards Yongmun
