= Yangjeong station (Namyangju) =

Station of the Seoul Metropolitan Subway

양정; Yangjeong
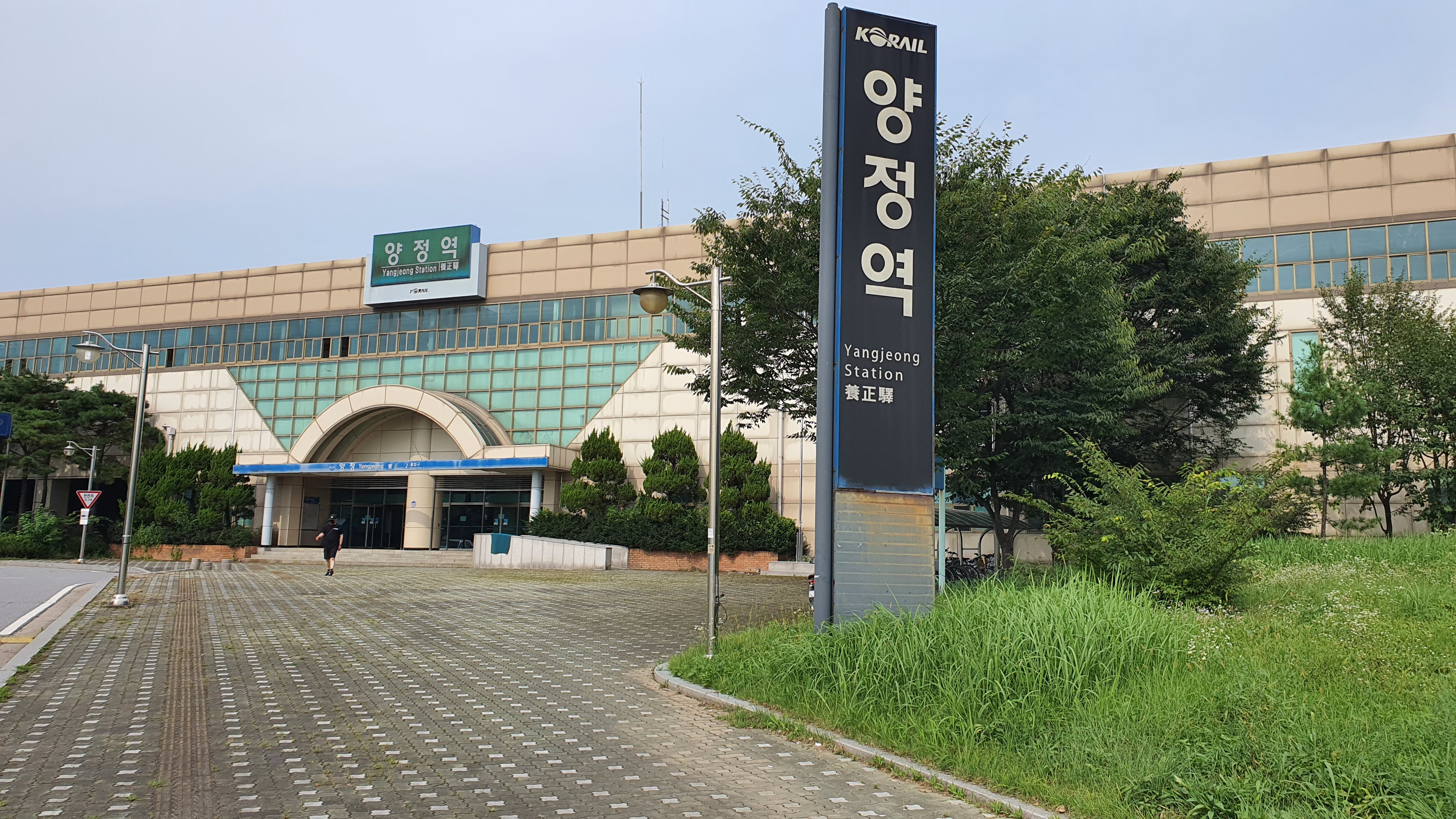

Korean name
- Hangul: 양정역
- Hanja: 養正驛
- Revised Romanization: Yangjeong-yeok
- McCune–Reischauer: Yangjŏng-yŏk

General information
- Location: 398-32 Ipae-dong, 237 Gyeonggangno, Namyangju-si, Gyeonggi-do
- Coordinates: 37°36′19″N 127°11′37″E
- Operator: Korail
- Line: Gyeongui–Jungang Line
- Platforms: 2
- Tracks: 2

Construction
- Structure type: Aboveground

Key dates
- December 16, 2005: Gyeongui–Jungang Line opened
Location

Yangjeong station is a station on the Gyeongui–Jungang Line in Namyangju, Gyeonggi Province, South Korea. In 2021, 685 people boarded at this station and 598 disembarked.

Preceding station	Seoul Metropolitan Subway	Following station
Donong towards Munsan	Gyeongui–Jungang Line	Deokso towards Jipyeong
Donong towards Munsan	Gyeongui–Jungang Line Gyeongui Express	Deokso towards Yongmun
