= Omokgyo station =

Metro station in South Korea

Coordinates: 37°31′28.1″N 126°52′30.5″E

오목교 (목동운동장앞); Omokgyo (Mokdong Stadium)
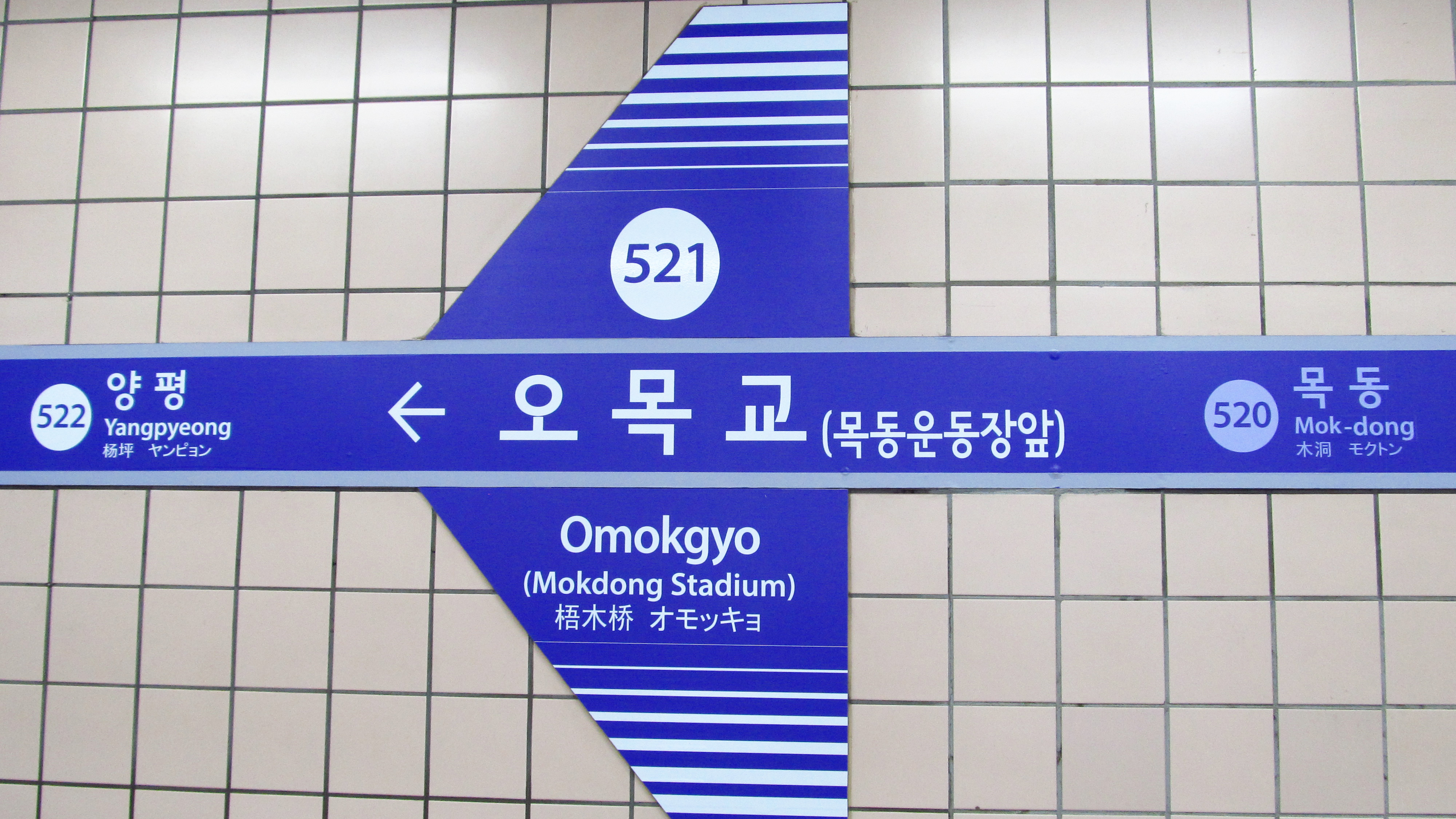
- Station sign

Korean name
- Hangul: 오목교역
- Hanja: 梧木橋驛
- Revised Romanization: Omokgyo-yeok
- McCune–Reischauer: Omokkyo-yŏk

General information
- Location: 405-26 Mok 1-dong, 342 Omok-ro Jiha; Yangcheon-gu, Seoul
- Operator: Seoul Metro
- Line: Line 5
- Platforms: 2
- Tracks: 2

Construction
- Structure type: Underground

History
- Opened: August 12, 1996

Services
Preceding station	Seoul Metropolitan Subway	Following station
Mok-dong towards Banghwa	Line 5	Yangpyeong towards Hanam Geomdansan or Macheon
Location

Omokgyo Station is a station in the west of Seoul on Seoul Subway Line 5. It is considered the principal station of the affluent Mok-dong area, and the Hyperion Towers are right outside Exit 2. Mokdong Baseball Stadium, former home of the Korea Baseball Organization's Nexen Heroes, is a short walk from Exit 4. Broadcasting company SBS' headquarters is located nearby. It is one of two stations close to the Seoul Immigration Office, which is located near Exit 7.

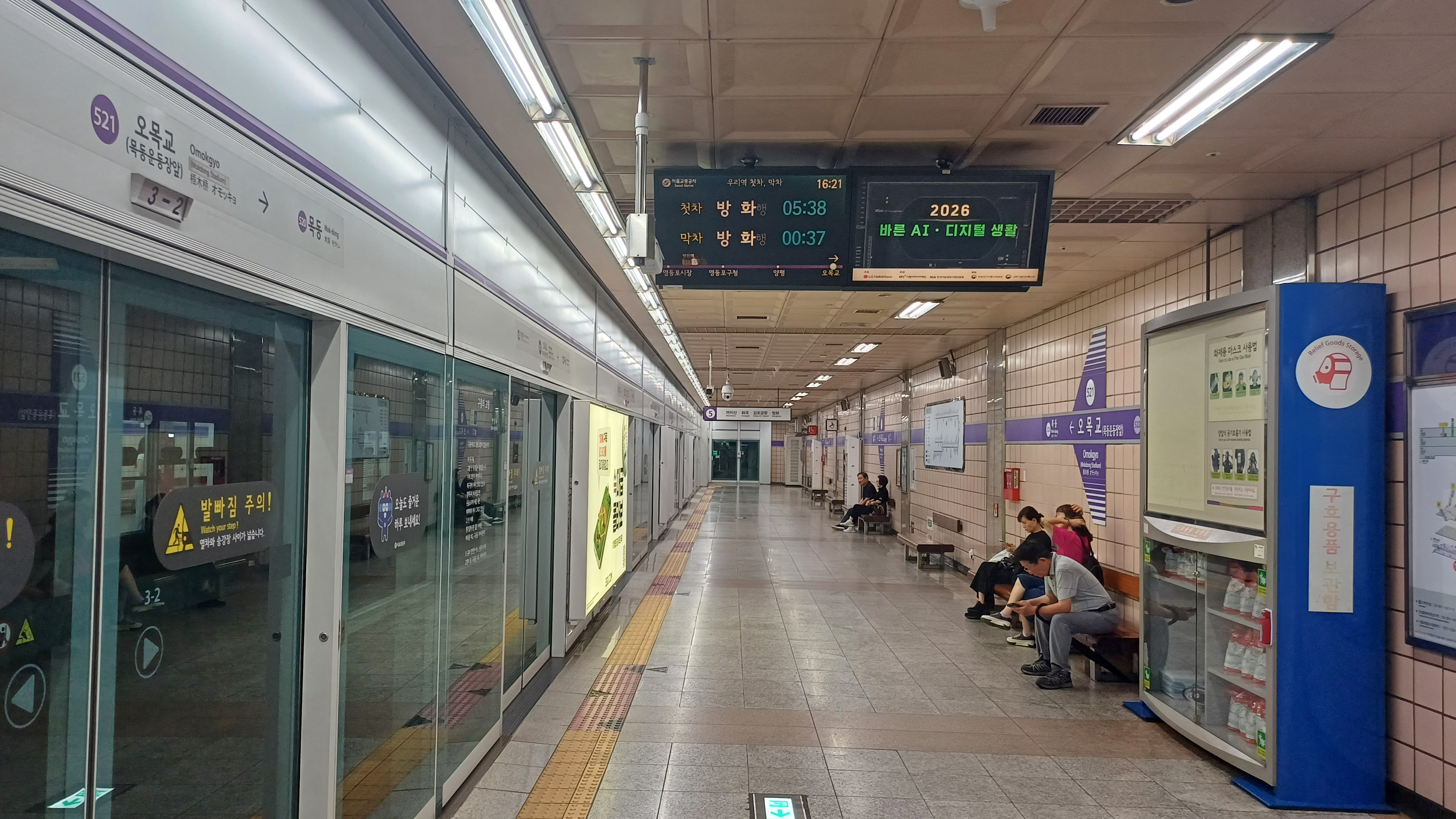
Station platform

== Station layout ==
G	Street level	Exit

L1; Concourse	Lobby	Customer Service, Shops, Vending machines, ATMs

L2; Platforms	Side platform, doors will open on the right
L2; Platforms	Westbound	← Line 5 toward Banghwa (Mok-dong)
L2; Platforms	Eastbound	Line 5 toward Hanam Geomdansan or Macheon (Yangpyeong)→
L2; Platforms	Side platform, doors will open on the right

== Exits ==
Exit number 1 is named after Daehakhakwon, a preparatory educational institution (hagwon) that is designed to prepare high school graduates (Jaesusaengs) for the College Scholastic Ability Test known as Suneung. Exits number 2 and 5 connects with the mokdong branch of Hyundai Department Store, while exit number 3 connect with the Mokdong Stadium and exit number 4 with the Dongsin University Oriental center, a traditional korean medicine hospital.
