= Yangpyeong station (Yangpyeong) =

Station of the Seoul Metropolitan Subway

양평
Yangpyeong
양평; Yangpyeong
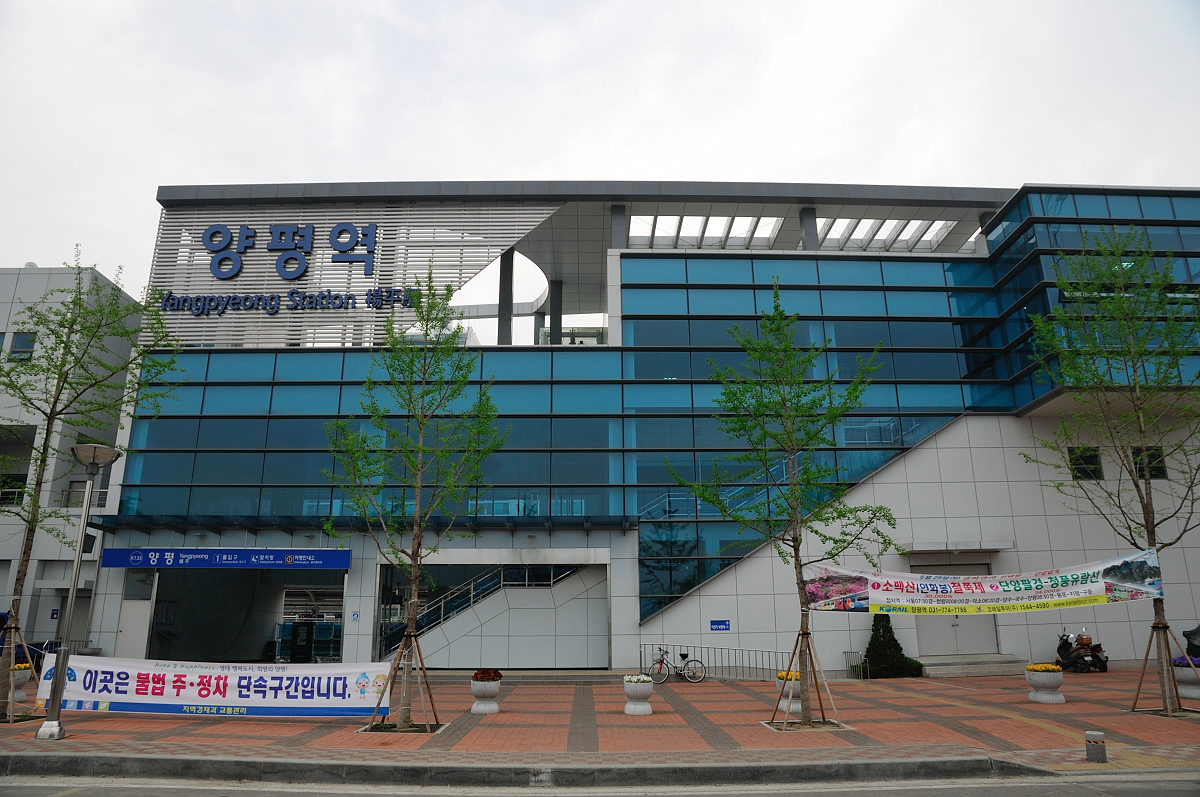

Korean name
- Hangul: 양평역
- Hanja: 楊平驛
- RR: Yangpyeong-yeok
- MR: Yangp'yŏng-yŏk

General information
- Location: 137 Yanggeunni, 30; Yeokjeongil, Yangpyeong-eup, Yangpyeong-gun, Gyeonggi-do
- Coordinates: 37°29′34″N 127°29′31″E
- Operator: Korail
- Lines: Gyeongui–Jungang Line; Jungang line
- Platforms: 4
- Tracks: 6

Construction
- Structure type: Aboveground

History
- Opened: April 1, 1939

Key dates
- December 23, 2009: Gyeongui–Jungang Line opened

Services
Preceding station	Seoul Metropolitan Subway	Following station
Obin towards Munsan	Gyeongui–Jungang Line	Wondeok towards Jipyeong
Obin towards Munsan	Gyeongui–Jungang Line Gyeongui Express	Wondeok towards Yongmun
Yangsu towards Munsan	Gyeongui–Jungang Line Jungang Express	Yongmun Terminus
Preceding station	Korea Train Express	Following station
Deokso towards Haengsin or Seoul	Gangneung KTX	Seowonju towards Donghae or Gangneung
Deokso towards Seoul	Jungang KTX	Seowonju towards Bujeon
Preceding station	Korail	Following station
Deokso towards Cheongnyangni	ITX-Maum Jungang Line	Yongmun towards Andong or Bujeon
Deokso towards Cheongnyangni	Mugunghwa-ho Taebaek Line	Yongmun towards Donghae
Location

Yangpyeong station is a train station on the Gyeongui–Jungang Line the commuter rail service of the Seoul Metropolitan Subway system, in South Korea. Its name duplicates with Yangpyeong Station in Seoul Subway Line 5, so the two stations can be confused with each other.
