= Yangpyeong station (Seoul) =

Station of the Seoul Metropolitan Subway

Coordinates: 37°31′32″N 126°53′10″E

양평; Yangpyeong
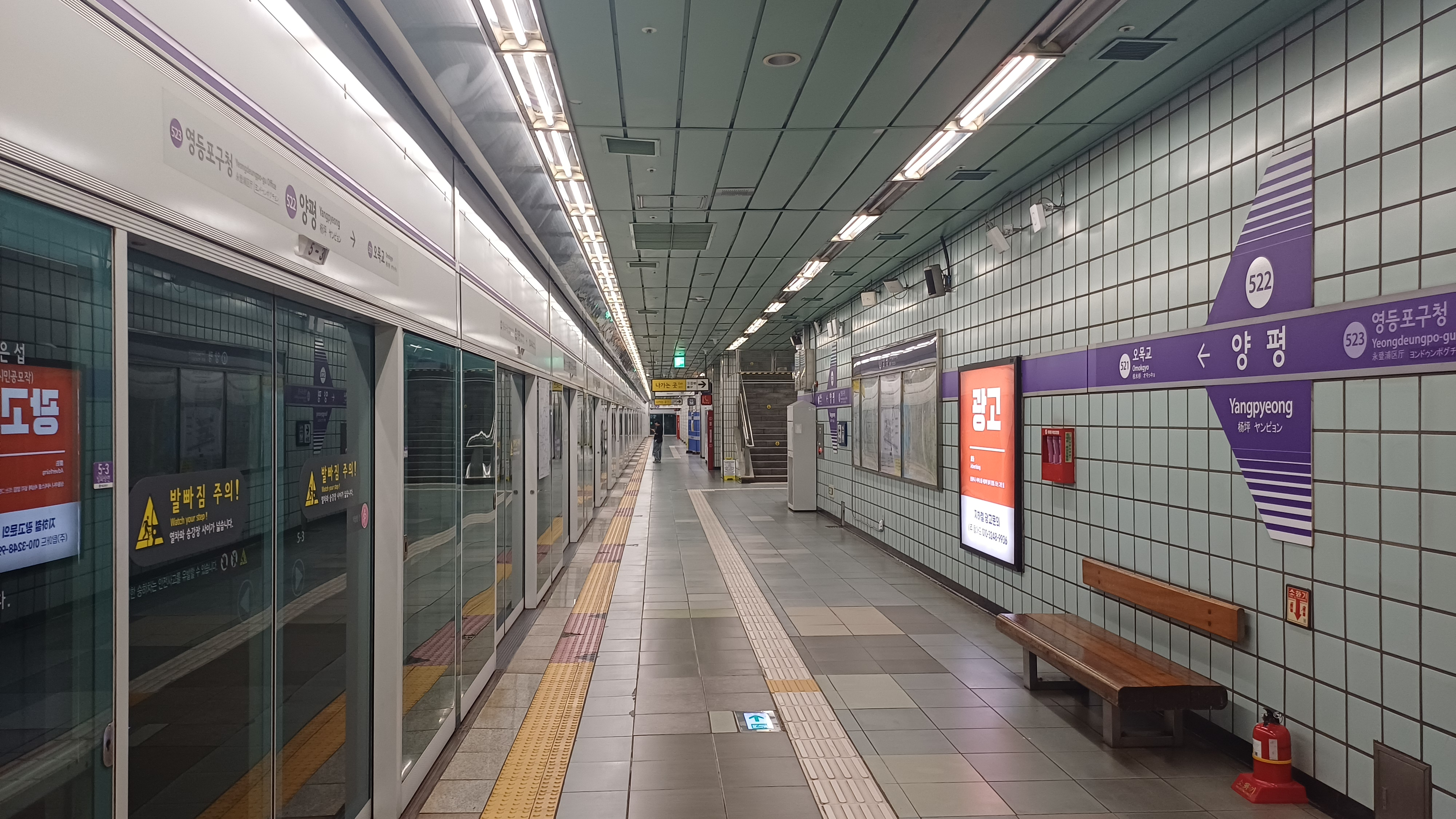
- Station platform

Korean name
- Hangul: 양평역
- Hanja: 楊坪驛
- Revised Romanization: Yangpyeong-yeok
- McCune–Reischauer: Yangp'yŏng-yŏk

General information
- Location: 33-79 Yangpyeong-dong 2-ga, Yeongdeungpo-gu, Seoul
- Operator: Seoul Metro
- Line: Line 5
- Platforms: 2
- Tracks: 2

Construction
- Structure type: Underground

History
- Opened: August 12, 1996

Services
Preceding station	Seoul Metropolitan Subway	Following station
Omokgyo towards Banghwa	Line 5	Yeongdeungpo-gu Office towards Hanam Geomdansan or Macheon
Location

Yangpyeong Station is Line 5 subway station in Seoul, South Korea. The station lies near Yeouido and there are many apartment complexes. In fact, the confirmation was allowed to rebuild old complex.

This station shares a name with Yangpyeong Station on the Gyeongui-Jungang Line in Yangpyeong, Gyeonggi-do.

== Station layout ==
G	Street level	Exit

L1; Concourse	Lobby	Customer service, shops, vending machines, ATMs

L2; Platforms	Side platform, doors will open on the right
L2; Platforms	Westbound	← Line 5 toward Banghwa (Omokgyo)
L2; Platforms	Eastbound	Line 5 toward Hanam Geomdansan or Macheon (Yeongdeungpo-gu Office)→
L2; Platforms	Side platform, doors will open on the right

== Entrance ==
- Exit 1 : Dangjoong elementary school, Yangpyeong dong Street No.3
- Exit 2 : Yangpyeong 1 dong office, Gwanak elementary school
