= Incheon =

City in South Korea

- Metropolitan city
- Incheon Metropolitan City
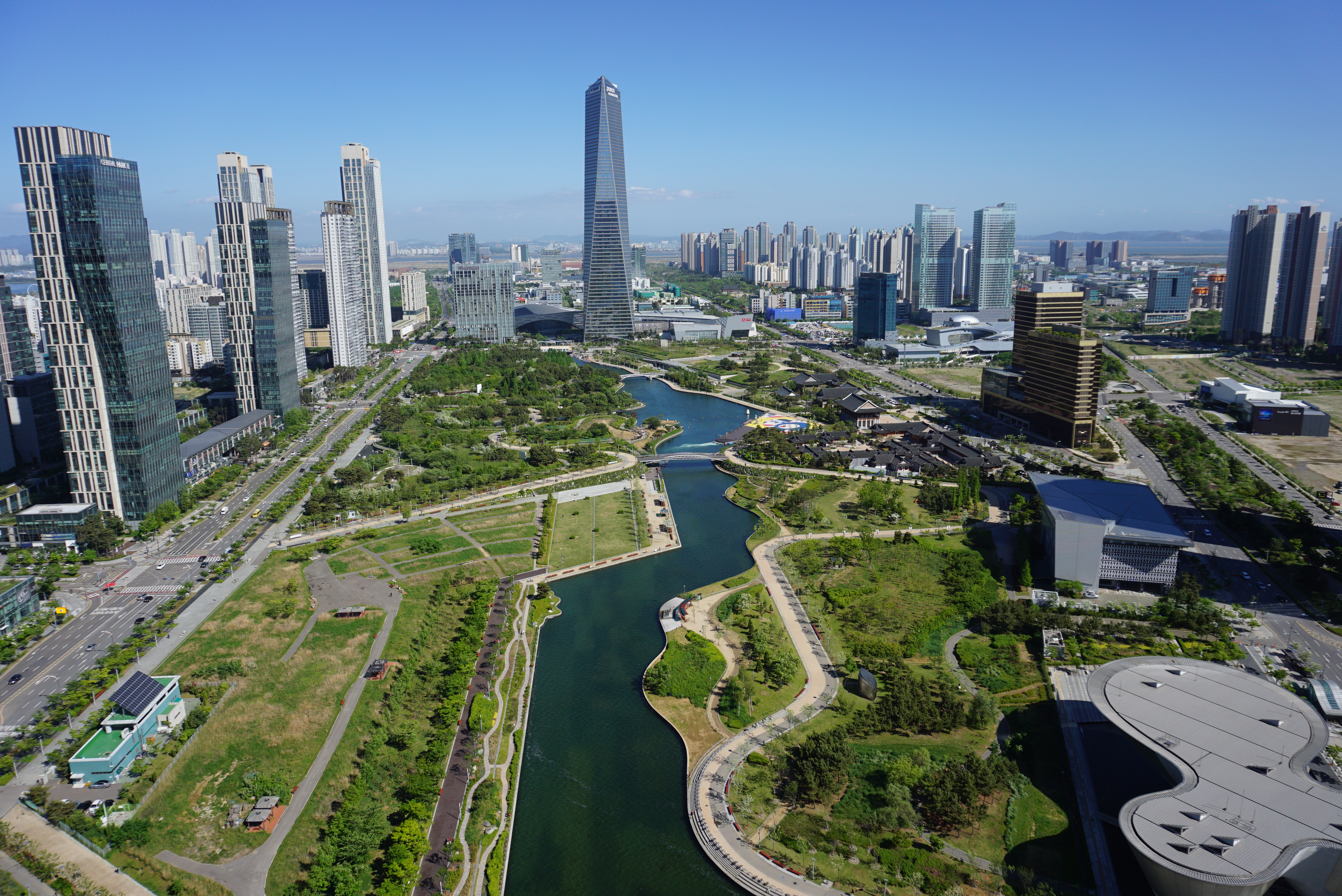
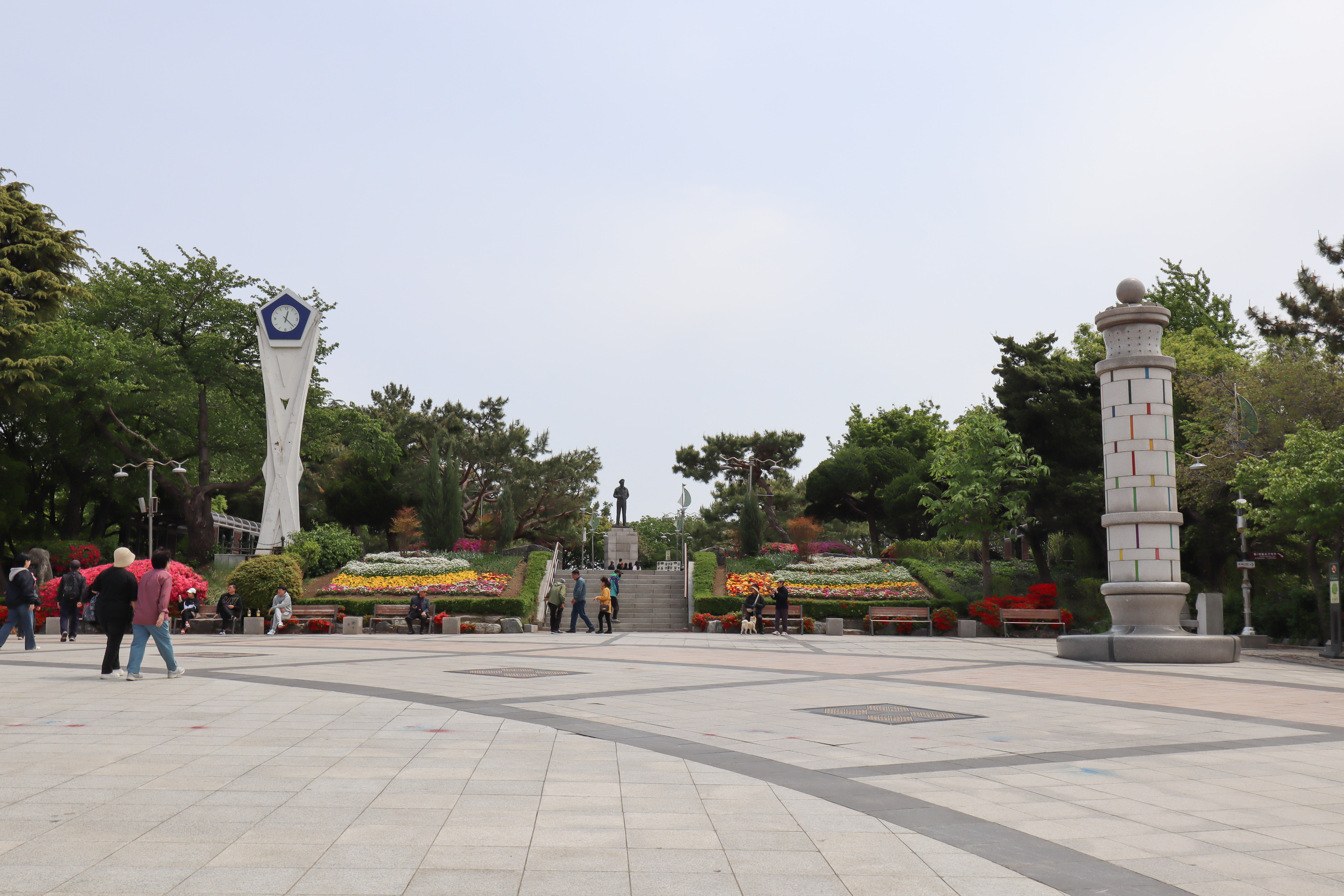
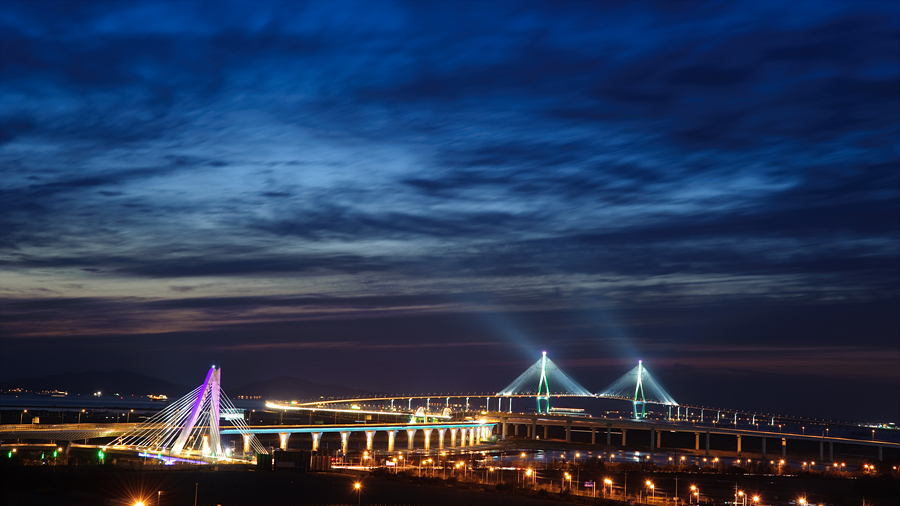
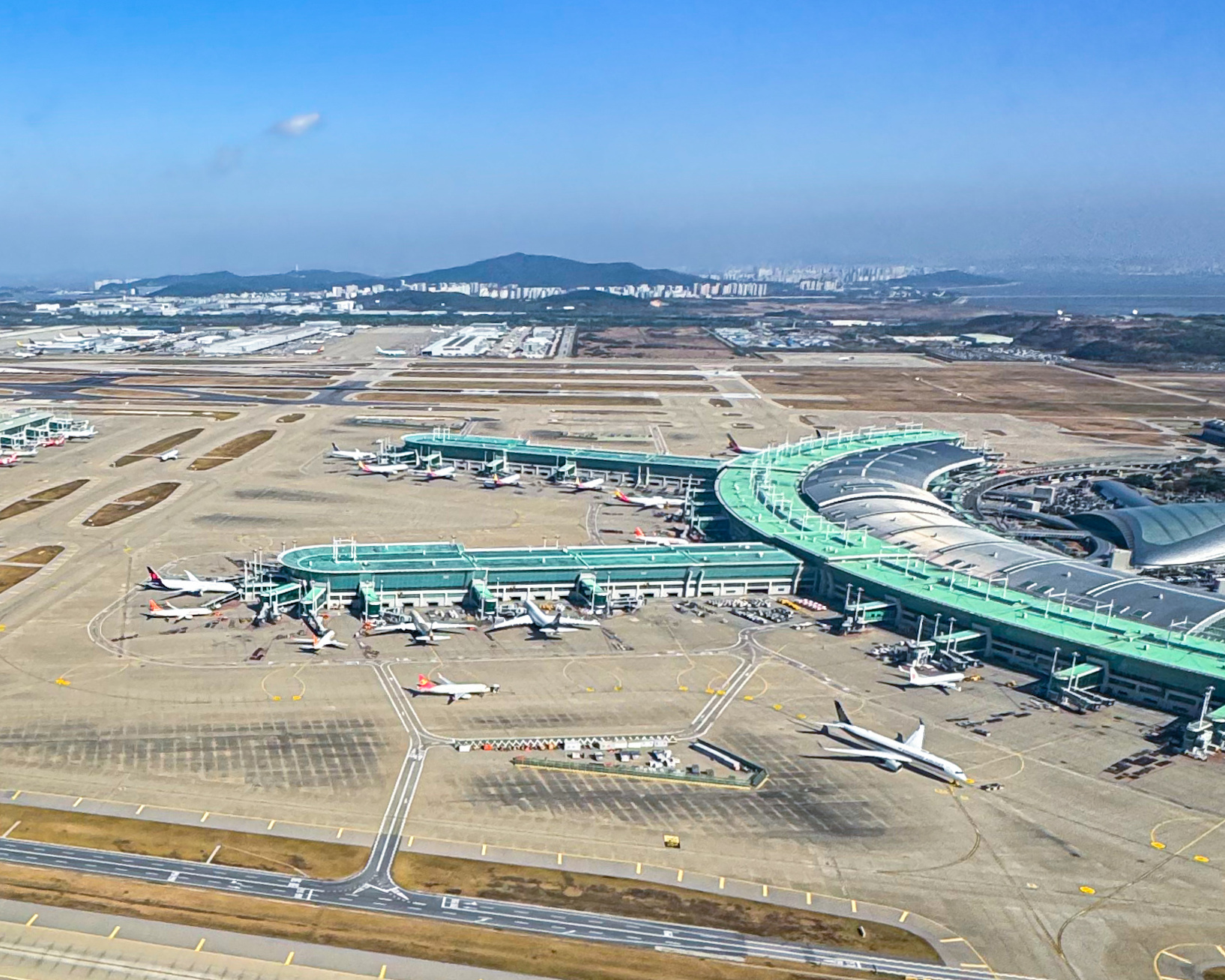
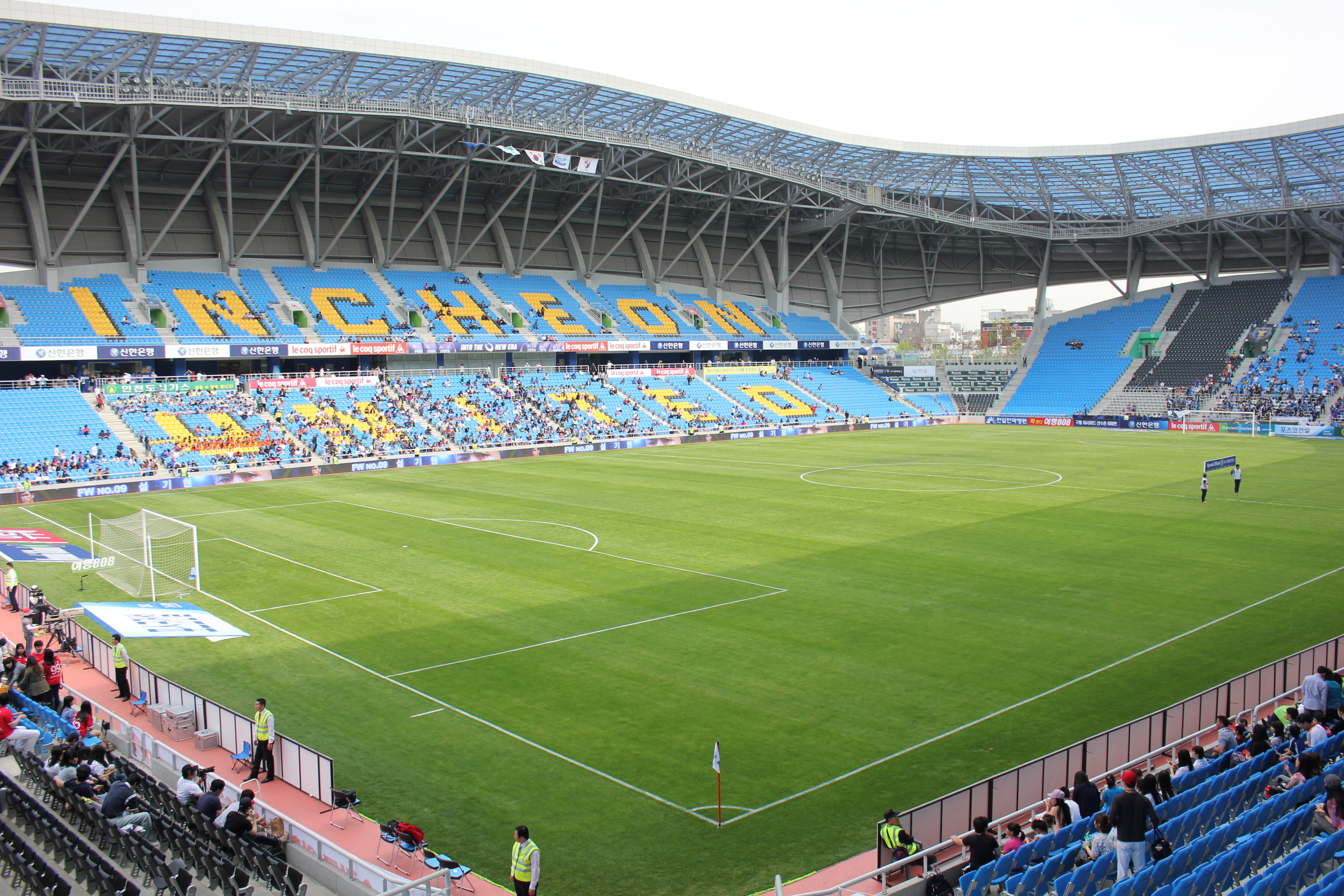
- Songdo IBD Jayu Park Incheon Bridge Incheon International Airport Incheon Football Stadium Wolmido

- Flag Logo
- Anthem: Song of Incheon

- Location within South Korea Location within Asia
- Coordinates: 37°29′N 126°38′E
- Country: South Korea
- Region: Seoul Metropolitan
- Established: 18 BC; as Michuhol; 1995 AD; as Incheon Metropolitan City
- Subdivisions: List: 9 districts ("gu"); Bupyeong District; Geomdan District; Namdong District; Jemulpo District; Michuhol District; Namdong District; Seohae District; Yeonsu District; Yeongjong District; 2 counties ("gun"); Ganghwa County; Ongjin County

Government
  - Type: Mayor-Council
  - Mayor: Park Chan-dae (Democratic)
  - Body: Incheon Metropolitan Council

Area
  - Total: 1,062.63 km^{2} (410.28 sq mi)

Population (January 2026)
  - Total: 3,015,482
  - Density: 2,837.75/km^{2} (7,349.75/sq mi)

GDP (Nominal, 2023)
  - Total: KRW 117 trillion (US$ 94 billion)
  - Per capita: US$ 35,295
- Time zone: UTC+9 (Korea Standard Time)
- Area code: +82-31
- ISO 3166 code: KR-28
- Dialect: Gyeonggi
- Flower: Rose
- Tree: Tulip tree
- Bird: Crane
- Website: Official website (English)

Korean name
- Hangul: 인천광역시
- Hanja: 仁川廣域市
- RR: Incheon-gwangyeoksi
- MR: Inch'ŏn-gwangyŏksi

Incheon (Note: Korean: 인천; Korean pronunciation: [intɕʰʌ̹n]; or Inch'ŏn; literally "kind river"), formerly Jemulpo or Chemulp'o (Korean: 제물포) until the period after 1910, officially the Incheon Metropolitan City (인천광역시)) is a city located in northwestern South Korea, bordering Seoul and Gyeonggi Province to the east. Inhabited since the Neolithic, Incheon was home to just 4,700 people when it became an international port in 1883. As of February 2020, about 3 million people live in the city, making it South Korea's third-most-populous city after Seoul and Busan.

The city's growth has been assured in modern times with the development of its port due to its natural advantages as a coastal city and its proximity to the South Korean capital. It is part of the Seoul Metropolitan Area, along with Seoul itself and Gyeonggi Province, forming the world's fourth-largest metropolitan area by population.

Incheon has since led the economic development of South Korea by opening its port to the outside world, ushering in the modernization of South Korea as a center of industrialization. In 2003, the city was designated as South Korea's first free economic zone. Since then, large local companies and global enterprises have increasingly invested in the Incheon Free Economic Zone, including Samsung which chose Songdo International City as its new investment destination for its bio industry.

As an international city, Incheon has held numerous large-scale international conferences, such as the Incheon Global Fair & Festival in 2009. The 17th Asian Games Incheon 2014 was also held in Incheon on 19 September 2014. Incheon is also a major transportation hub in northeast Asia, with Incheon International Airport and Incheon Port. The large volume of port traffic makes Incheon a Large-Port Metropolis using the Southampton System of Port-City classification.

== History ==
The first historical record of the Incheon area dates back to 475 AD, during the reign of King Jangsu of Goguryeo, by the name of Michuhol, which is supposed to be located on modern Munhak Hill (문학산). The area underwent several name changes with successive kingdoms and dynasties. In Goryeo era, Incheon was called Gyeongwon (경원) or Inju (인주). The current name was turned to Incheon in 1413. Later, Incheon County became Incheon Metropolitan Prefecture (dohobu, 도호부). Old Incheon consisted of modern southern Incheon (i.e. Jung-gu, Dong-gu, Nam-gu, Yeonsu District, and Namdong District) and the northern part of Siheung. The city center was Gwangyo-dong, where the prefecture office (도호부청사) and the local academy (hyanggyo, 향교) were located. The "original" two remaining buildings of the Incheon prefecture office are located in Munhak Elementary School, while the newly built (in 2001) prefecture office buildings are right across from Munhak Baseball Stadium.

=== Modern history ===
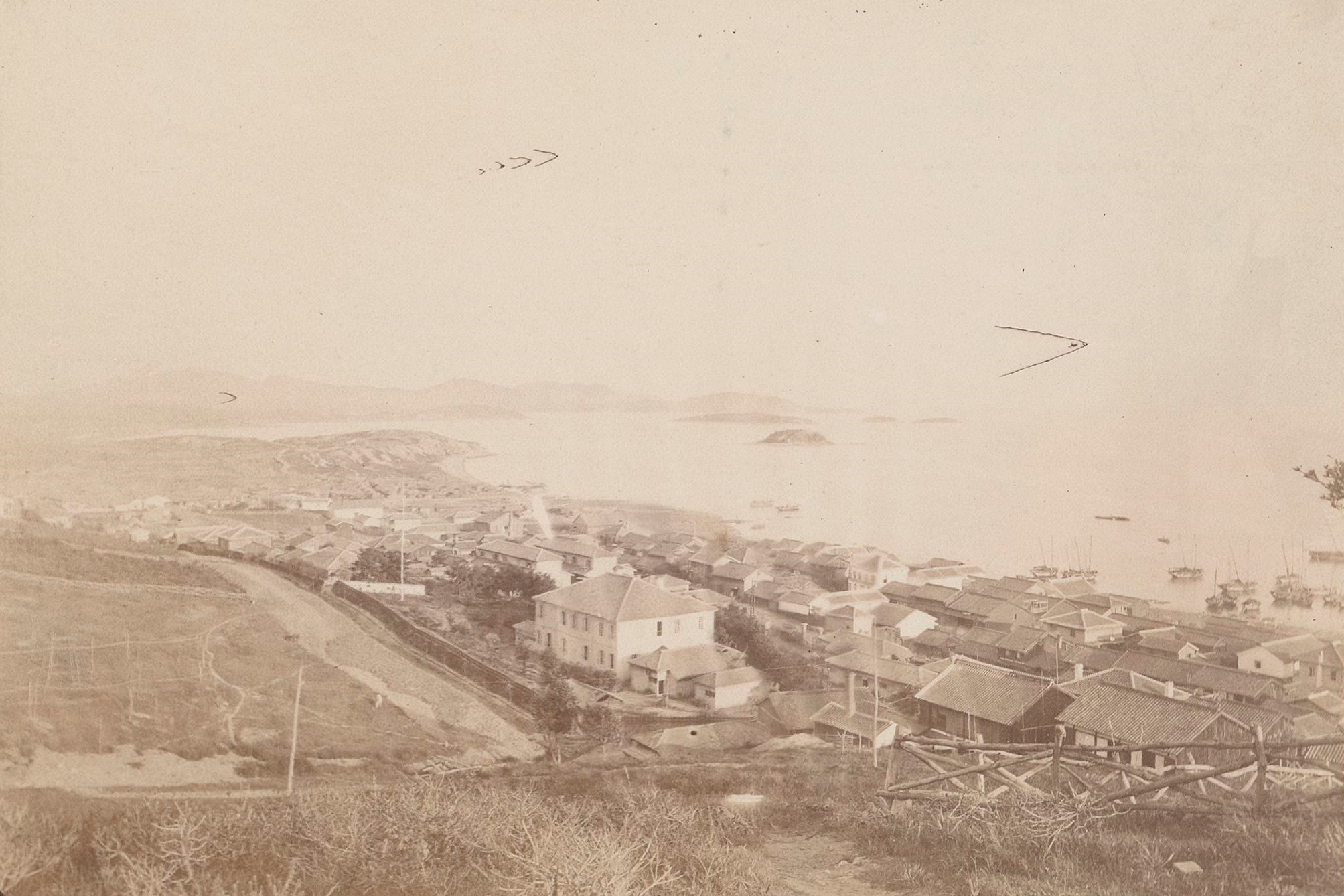
Jemulpo in 1890

Another historical name of the city, Jemulpo (alternatively Romanized as Chemulpo), was not widely used until the opening of the port in 1883. It was frequently used until the Japanese annexation. After the opening of the Incheon port, the city center moved from Gwangyo to Jemulpo. Today, either Jemulpo or Gwangyo-dong is considered "Original Incheon" (원인천). It was internationally known as Jinsen during Japanese rule, based on the Japanese pronunciation of Incheon's Sino-Korean name.

In 1914, the Japanese colonial government merged outer parts of old Incheon (including the former center of Gwangyo) with Bupyeong County, forming Bucheon County. Between 1936 and 1940, some part of Bucheon County was recombined into Incheon, by which some part of "old" Bupyeong was annexed into Incheon.

Incheon was originally part of Gyeonggi Province, but was granted Directly Governed (now Metropolitan) City status on 1 July 1981; the city officially separated from the province. In 1989, neighboring islands and Gyeyang township of Gimpo County (Note: Prior to 1973, the township belonged to Bucheon or old Bupyeong.) were ceded to Incheon and in 1995 Geomdan township of Gimpo County and two counties of Ganghwa and Onjin were annexed to Incheon.

Incheon was known as Inchon prior to South Korea's adoption of a new Romanization system in 2000.

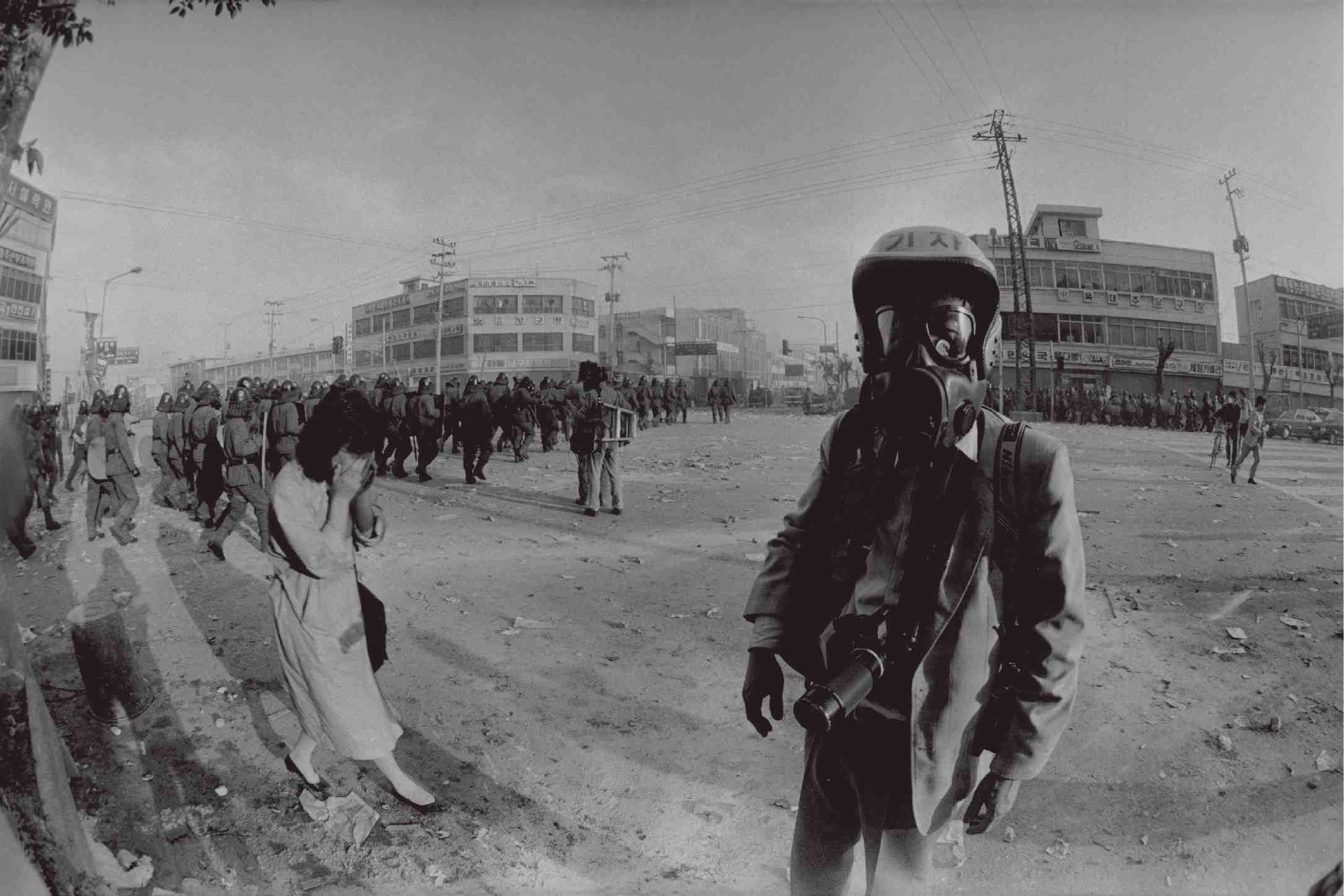
Juan-dong, Incheon attacked with tear gas in May 1987

=== Major events ===
The city was the site of the Battle of Chemulpo Bay, where the first shots of the Russo-Japanese War were fired.

During the Korean War, Incheon was occupied by North Korean troops on 4 July 1950. Incheon was the site of the Battle of Inchon when UN troops landed to relieve pressure on the Pusan Perimeter and to launch a United Nations offensive northward. The result was a decisive UN victory and it was recaptured on 19 September 1950. USS Inchon was named after the tide-turning battle that ensued.

Prior to and during the June Democratic Movement in 1987, Incheon was the site of several pro-democracy protests.

Incheon has also hosted a series of major international events. The Global Fair & Festival 2009 Incheon was held in the Songdo District in August 2009. It was open from 7 August to 25 October for a period of 80 days. It was a comprehensive international event with global institutions and corporations as participants. Various musicians and artists performed during the event.

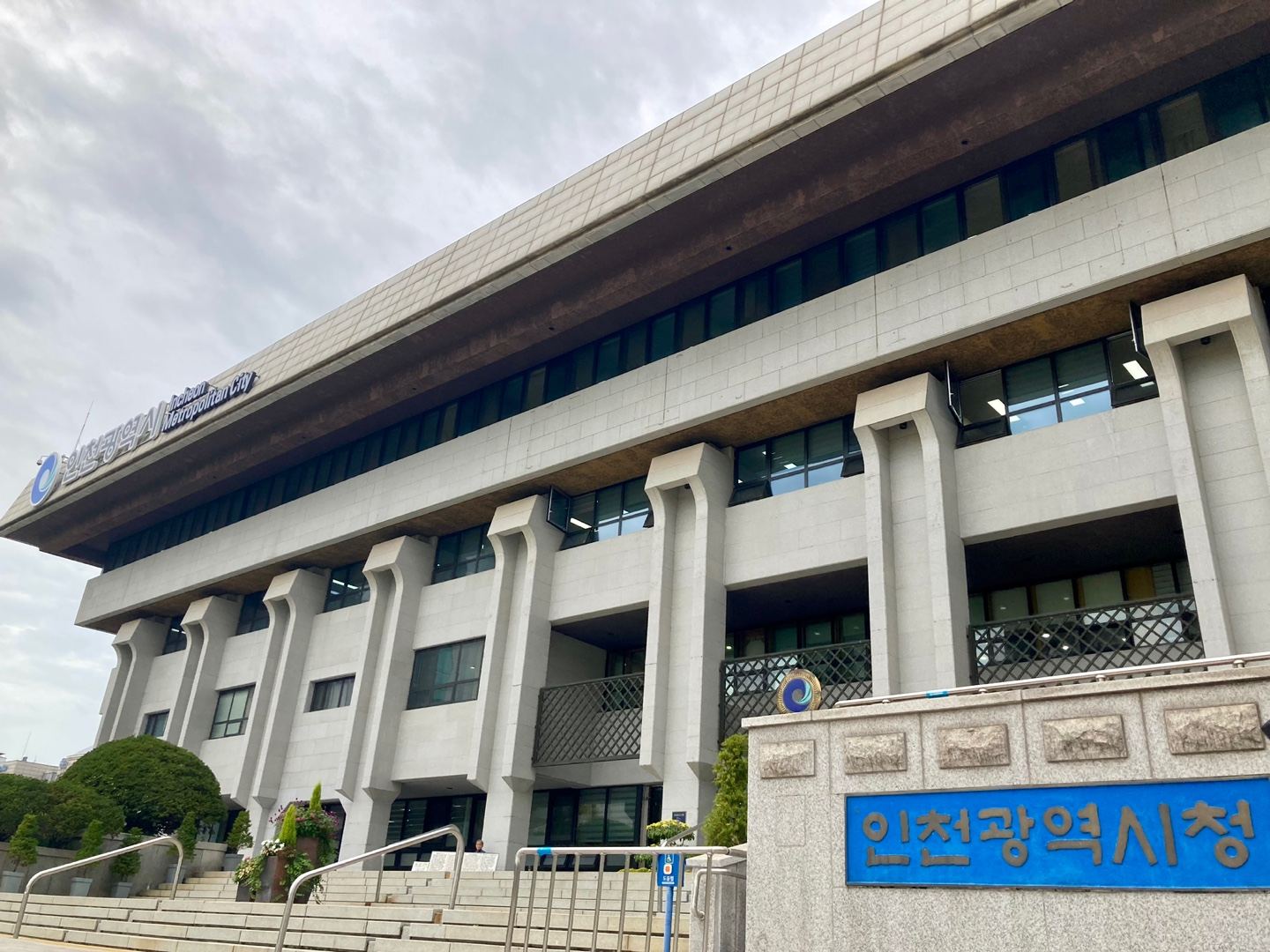
Incheon City Hall (2024.10)

The city hosted a meeting of the G20 Finance Ministers in February 2010. Incheon was the site of the third Global Model United Nations Conference, held from 10 to 14 August 2011.

It first hosted the Incheon Women Artists' Biennale in 2004 which expanded into welcoming international artists in its subsequent 2007, 2009 and 2011.

Incheon hosted the Asian Games in 2014. It hosted the 6th OECD World Forum in 2018.

Incheon was designated as the World Book Capital for the year 2015 by UNESCO.

== Education ==
On 27 February 2007, Incheon declared itself an "English City", and inaugurated the "Incheon Free English Zone" program. The goal of the program is to make the city as proficient in English as Singapore. This is for the ultimate purpose of establishing Incheon as a commercial and business hub of northeast Asia (see Free Economic Zone below). The official slogan of the program is "Smile with English".

=== Higher education ===
Incheon is home to a number of colleges and universities:

- George Mason University Korea Campus
- Ghent University Global Campus
- Gyeongin National University of Education Incheon campus
- Inha University (formerly Inha Institute of Technology)
- Gachon University Medical·Ganghwa campus
- Gyeongin Women's College
- Inha Technical College
- Incheon Catholic University
- Incheon City College
- Incheon National University
- Jaineung College
- University of Utah Asia Campus
- SUNY South Korea
- Anyang University Ganghwa campus
- Yonsei University International campus
- Korea Polytechnics II
- Seongsan Hyo University
- Juan International University
- Chungwoon University Incheon Campu

== Climate ==
Incheon has a humid subtropical climate (Köppen: Cwa) using the −3 °C (27 °F) isotherm, and humid continental climate (Köppen Dwa, respectively) using the 0 °C (32 °F) isotherm. Like other metropolitan cities, Incheon has a strong urban heat island effect. Incheon's climate is about average compared to the rest of Korea, with 8 locations being cooler and 10 locations being warmer, and with 9 locations being wetter and 9 locations being drier.

Incheon experiences each of its four seasons, distinctly feeling the rise and fall of temperature and humidity. The temperature however, never rises to an extreme, and the climate of the city is essentially mild. Incheon is swept by the seasonal winds as the northwesterly winds strike the city in the winter and the summer in Incheon is affected by gusts of the warm southwesterly winds.

Climate data for Incheon (1991–2020 normals, extremes 1904–present)
Month	Jan	Feb	Mar	Apr	May	Jun	Jul	Aug	Sep	Oct	Nov	Dec	Year
Record high °C (°F)	15.8 (60.4)	18.2 (64.8)	21.9 (71.4)	32.7 (90.9)	31.2 (88.2)	33.8 (92.8)	38.9 (102.0)	38.9 (102.0)	33.4 (92.1)	28.6 (83.5)	26.2 (79.2)	17.5 (63.5)	38.9 (102.0)
Mean daily maximum °C (°F)	2.2 (36.0)	4.8 (40.6)	10.1 (50.2)	16.2 (61.2)	21.6 (70.9)	25.6 (78.1)	27.8 (82.0)	29.2 (84.6)	25.8 (78.4)	19.9 (67.8)	12.0 (53.6)	4.5 (40.1)	16.6 (61.9)
Daily mean °C (°F)	−1.5 (29.3)	0.7 (33.3)	5.6 (42.1)	11.5 (52.7)	16.8 (62.2)	21.3 (70.3)	24.4 (75.9)	25.6 (78.1)	21.5 (70.7)	15.3 (59.5)	7.9 (46.2)	0.7 (33.3)	12.5 (54.5)
Mean daily minimum °C (°F)	−4.8 (23.4)	−2.8 (27.0)	2.1 (35.8)	7.9 (46.2)	13.1 (55.6)	18.0 (64.4)	21.8 (71.2)	22.9 (73.2)	18.1 (64.6)	11.4 (52.5)	4.3 (39.7)	−2.7 (27.1)	9.1 (48.4)
Record low °C (°F)	−21.0 (−5.8)	−18.4 (−1.1)	−13.8 (7.2)	−3.6 (25.5)	3.4 (38.1)	8.7 (47.7)	12.8 (55.0)	14.4 (57.9)	5.3 (41.5)	−3.2 (26.2)	−12.0 (10.4)	−18.6 (−1.5)	−21.0 (−5.8)
Average precipitation mm (inches)	15.9 (0.63)	25.1 (0.99)	33.8 (1.33)	63.5 (2.50)	96.3 (3.79)	106.0 (4.17)	337.7 (13.30)	274.6 (10.81)	130.3 (5.13)	51.1 (2.01)	50.8 (2.00)	22.3 (0.88)	1,207.4 (47.54)
Average precipitation days (≥ 0.1 mm)	5.9	5.2	5.9	7.9	8.4	9.5	15.0	12.4	8.1	6.0	8.6	7.7	100.6
Average snowy days	7.1	4.4	2.0	0.2	0.0	0.0	0.0	0.0	0.0	0.0	1.8	6.6	22.1
Average relative humidity (%)	61.1	61.2	63.4	64.5	69.8	75.9	83.8	80.1	72.9	66.7	64.3	61.8	68.8
Mean monthly sunshine hours	186.6	188.5	215.3	220.0	239.5	212.5	159.7	189.8	200.4	219.1	170.2	176.7	2,378.3
Percentage possible sunshine	58.0	59.5	55.3	55.6	52.7	46.1	35.0	45.4	52.9	60.6	55.2	57.3	52.0
Source: Korea Meteorological Administration (percent sunshine 1981–2010)

Climate data for Ganghwa County, Incheon (1991–2020 normals, extremes 1972–present)
Month	Jan	Feb	Mar	Apr	May	Jun	Jul	Aug	Sep	Oct	Nov	Dec	Year
Record high °C (°F)	12.6 (54.7)	17.4 (63.3)	22.3 (72.1)	29.2 (84.6)	31.0 (87.8)	33.2 (91.8)	35.5 (95.9)	35.8 (96.4)	31.7 (89.1)	28.3 (82.9)	23.8 (74.8)	16.0 (60.8)	35.8 (96.4)
Mean daily maximum °C (°F)	1.7 (35.1)	4.5 (40.1)	9.8 (49.6)	16.2 (61.2)	21.4 (70.5)	25.4 (77.7)	27.6 (81.7)	29.0 (84.2)	25.5 (77.9)	19.5 (67.1)	11.5 (52.7)	3.9 (39.0)	16.3 (61.3)
Daily mean °C (°F)	−3.2 (26.2)	−0.7 (30.7)	4.6 (40.3)	10.7 (51.3)	16.0 (60.8)	20.5 (68.9)	23.7 (74.7)	24.7 (76.5)	20.2 (68.4)	13.7 (56.7)	6.3 (43.3)	−0.9 (30.4)	11.3 (52.3)
Mean daily minimum °C (°F)	−8.1 (17.4)	−5.8 (21.6)	−0.6 (30.9)	5.3 (41.5)	11.0 (51.8)	16.3 (61.3)	20.6 (69.1)	21.2 (70.2)	15.6 (60.1)	8.1 (46.6)	1.2 (34.2)	−5.7 (21.7)	6.6 (43.9)
Record low °C (°F)	−22.5 (−8.5)	−19.4 (−2.9)	−11.3 (11.7)	−4.4 (24.1)	1.6 (34.9)	6.9 (44.4)	12.7 (54.9)	12.5 (54.5)	3.0 (37.4)	−4.2 (24.4)	−12.0 (10.4)	−19.8 (−3.6)	−22.5 (−8.5)
Average precipitation mm (inches)	15.6 (0.61)	22.5 (0.89)	31.4 (1.24)	64.9 (2.56)	110.9 (4.37)	110.0 (4.33)	355.6 (14.00)	300.4 (11.83)	131.5 (5.18)	55.8 (2.20)	46.3 (1.82)	21.3 (0.84)	1,266.2 (49.85)
Average precipitation days (≥ 0.1 mm)	5.0	4.8	6.0	7.5	8.2	8.6	14.1	11.9	7.4	5.6	7.5	6.6	93.2
Average snowy days	7.3	4.3	2.4	0.2	0.0	0.0	0.0	0.0	0.0	0.1	1.5	5.1	20.6
Average relative humidity (%)	63.6	61.0	61.4	62.4	68.6	75.1	82.8	79.9	73.8	68.9	67.8	65.4	69.2
Mean monthly sunshine hours	186.2	186.5	217.0	221.7	235.3	208.5	153.0	184.9	203.8	214.3	166.0	171.8	2,349
Percentage possible sunshine	58.7	61.8	58.9	59.0	54.8	50.0	38.6	47.7	57.4	63.3	55.7	55.6	54.6
Source: Korea Meteorological Administration (percent sunshine 1981–2010)

Climate data for Baengnyeongdo, Ongjin County, Incheon (2001–2020 normals, extremes 2000–present)
Month	Jan	Feb	Mar	Apr	May	Jun	Jul	Aug	Sep	Oct	Nov	Dec	Year
Record high °C (°F)	9.4 (48.9)	15.5 (59.9)	17.3 (63.1)	23.7 (74.7)	28.1 (82.6)	30.0 (86.0)	33.5 (92.3)	33.2 (91.8)	29.9 (85.8)	25.6 (78.1)	20.3 (68.5)	13.8 (56.8)	33.5 (92.3)
Mean daily maximum °C (°F)	1.2 (34.2)	2.8 (37.0)	7.1 (44.8)	13.0 (55.4)	18.7 (65.7)	22.9 (73.2)	25.4 (77.7)	26.9 (80.4)	23.5 (74.3)	17.7 (63.9)	10.6 (51.1)	3.8 (38.8)	14.5 (58.1)
Daily mean °C (°F)	−1.3 (29.7)	0.0 (32.0)	3.8 (38.8)	9.1 (48.4)	14.5 (58.1)	19.0 (66.2)	22.3 (72.1)	23.8 (74.8)	20.1 (68.2)	14.7 (58.5)	7.9 (46.2)	1.2 (34.2)	11.3 (52.3)
Mean daily minimum °C (°F)	−3.4 (25.9)	−2.2 (28.0)	1.3 (34.3)	6.0 (42.8)	11.1 (52.0)	16.1 (61.0)	19.9 (67.8)	21.5 (70.7)	17.8 (64.0)	12.3 (54.1)	5.5 (41.9)	−1.1 (30.0)	8.7 (47.7)
Record low °C (°F)	−17.4 (0.7)	−15.3 (4.5)	−7.7 (18.1)	0.5 (32.9)	5.0 (41.0)	7.3 (45.1)	13.0 (55.4)	14.1 (57.4)	10.7 (51.3)	2.1 (35.8)	−3.9 (25.0)	−11.3 (11.7)	−17.4 (0.7)
Average precipitation mm (inches)	13.3 (0.52)	17.4 (0.69)	18.2 (0.72)	47.5 (1.87)	74.3 (2.93)	72.0 (2.83)	201.0 (7.91)	158.5 (6.24)	90.6 (3.57)	31.0 (1.22)	41.9 (1.65)	21.6 (0.85)	787.3 (31.00)
Average precipitation days (≥ 0.1 mm)	7.4	4.8	5.3	6.9	8.1	10.0	13.9	11.1	6.7	5.0	8.5	9.9	97.6
Average snowy days	11.0	6.2	2.3	0.1	0.0	0.0	0.0	0.0	0.0	0.2	3.0	12.7	35.5
Average relative humidity (%)	63.4	63.0	65.5	65.7	70.1	80.2	88.0	83.7	75.9	67.8	64.7	63.8	71.0
Mean monthly sunshine hours	139.9	166.6	216.9	219.3	239.6	191.0	136.7	189.6	212.4	217.6	146.7	117.3	2,193.6
Percentage possible sunshine	43.3	54.3	53.9	53.0	51.4	38.6	28.6	40.8	54.5	60.6	49.3	37.9	46.8
Source: Korea Meteorological Administration (percent sunshine 1981–2010)

== Economy ==
Incheon forms the heart of Capital Industrial Region. During the industrialization of South Korea, several industrial complexes were built throughout the city, and as a result, the city was largely dependent on manufacturing industry. But with the designation of Incheon Free Economic Zone in 2003, the city is now making an effort to foster new growth industries. Major industrial parks include Bupyeong industrial complex, which hosts GM Incheon plant(formerly a GM Daewoo Incheon plant), Juan industrial complex, and Namdong Industrial complex.

In recent years, bio industry is emerging as a new growth industry of the city. Currently, with the total production capacity of 330kℓ per year, the city ranks 2nd in the world by production capacity along with San Francisco, United States. The capacity is under expansion, and after completion in 2018, the city will rank 1st with the production capacity of 510kℓ. Also, logistics industry is also experiencing a rapid growth, thanks to Incheon Airport, which was ranked fourth in the world by cargo traffic, and the expansion of Incheon Port.

== Transportation ==
Incheon is a major domestic and international transport hub for Korea.

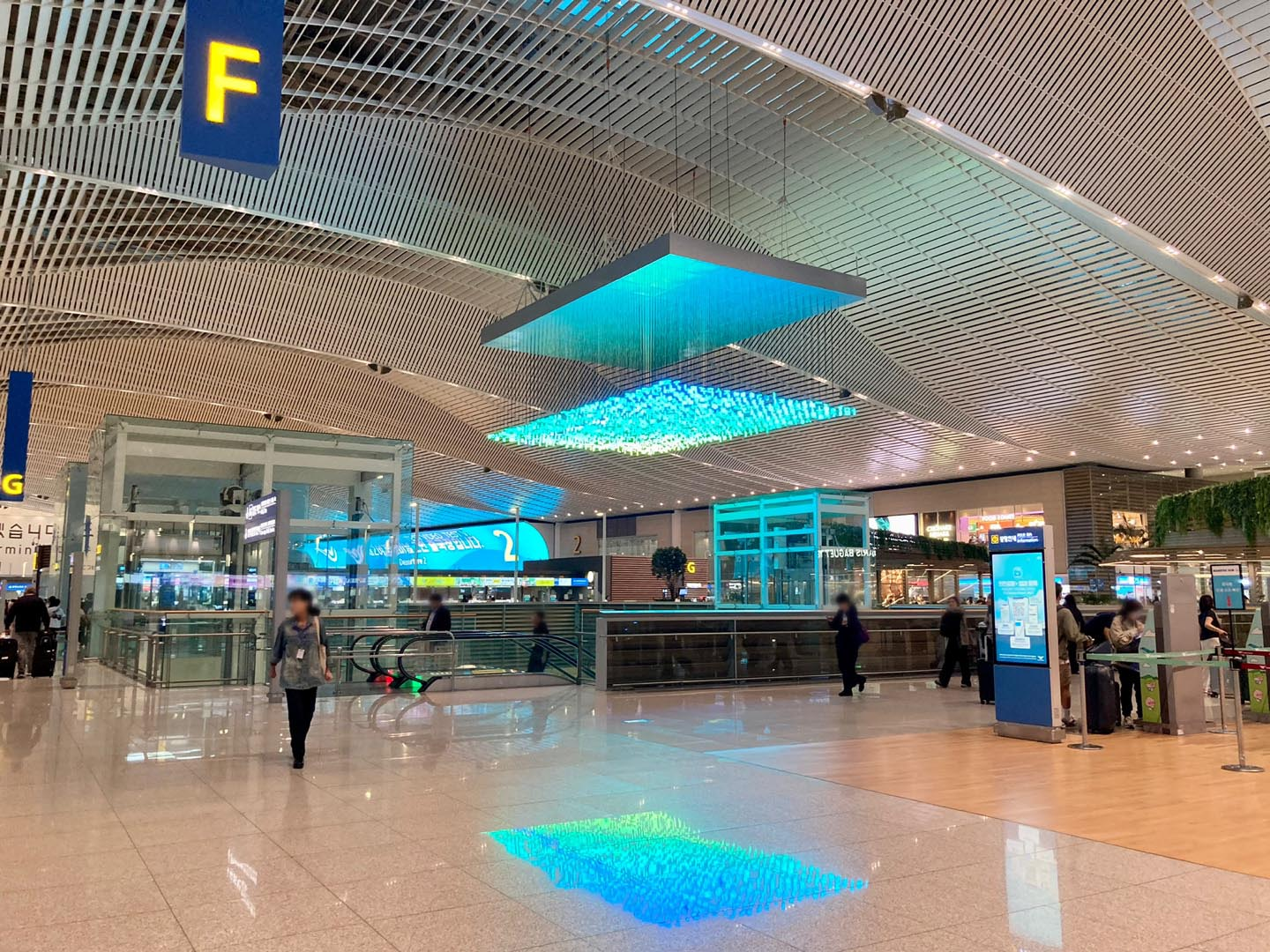
Incheon Air Departures

=== Air ===
Incheon International Airport is South Korea's primary international airport and a regional air hub. In 2015, it was the world's 22nd busiest airport by passenger traffic, with 49,412,750 passengers.

There were a total of 305,446 flights (300,634 international, 4,812 domestic) to and from Incheon International Airport in 2015, an average of 837 flights (824 international, 13 domestic) daily. Korea's two main carriers, Korean Air and Asiana Airlines, serviced 50.9% of flights, while low-cost and foreign carriers serviced the remaining 49.1% of flights. The airport is experiencing a rapid increase in passengers, and the opening of Terminal 2 in December 2017 spurred additional traffic.

The airport was also featured in the Korean drama series, Air City.

In 2018, Incheon International Airport handled 67.68 million international passengers, ranking fifth in the world by international passenger traffic—up two places from seventh in 2017, after overtaking Paris Charles de Gaulle and Singapore Changi.

=== Sea ===
Incheon's sea port is the second largest port in Korea after Busan Port.

The International Passenger Terminal located at the port offers ferries to five cities in China: Dalian, Qingdao, Tianjin, Dandong, and Weihai. There are also ferries to Incheon's outlying islands as well as Baengnyeongdo inside of the Northern Limit Line.

=== Buses ===
Incheon Bus Terminal, located at its eponymous subway stop, offers express bus transportation to all parts of Korea. Many city bus lines offer transportation within city limits as well as to the neighboring cities of Bucheon, Gimpo, Seoul, and Siheung.

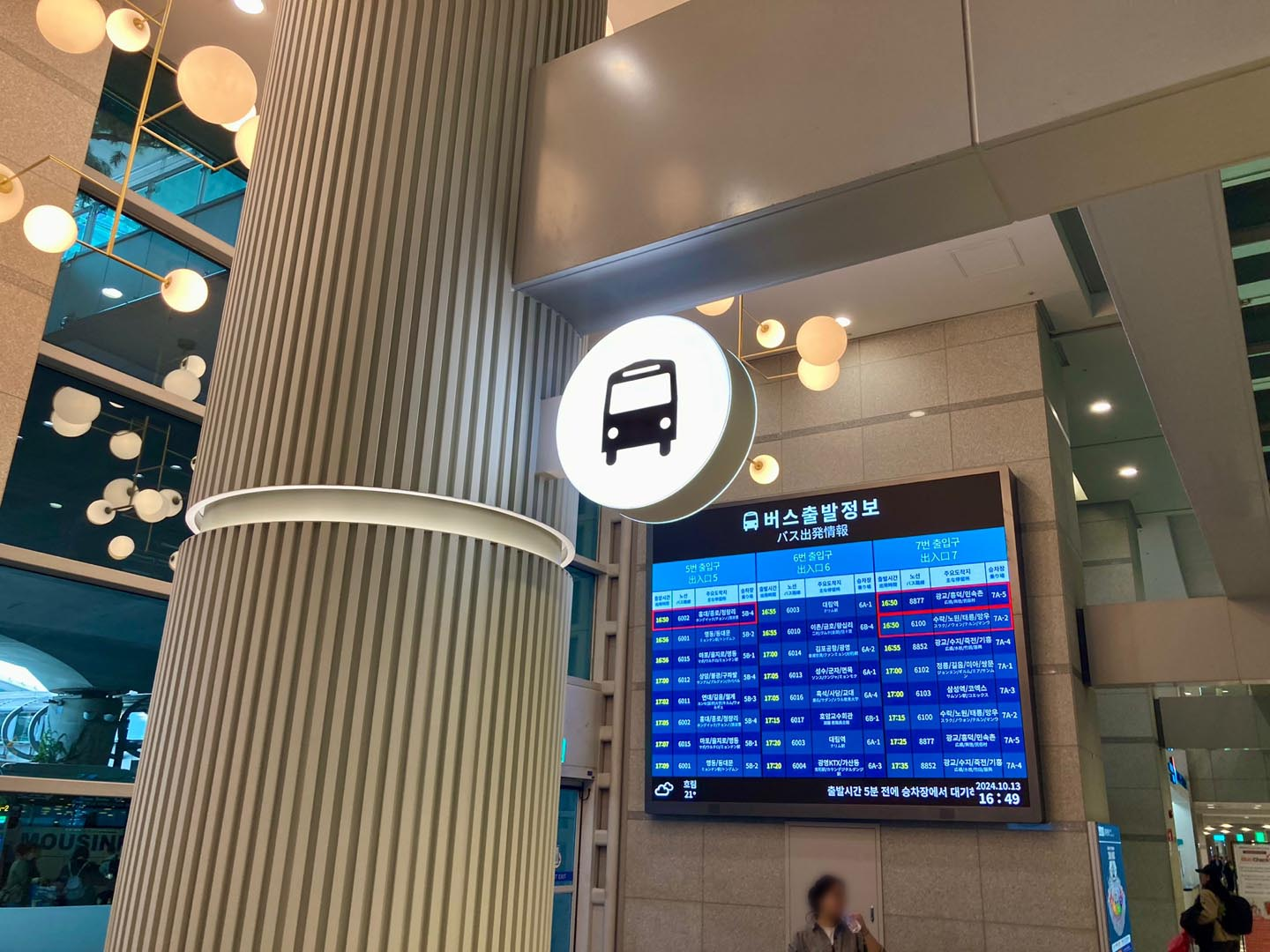
Incheon Air Bus Terminal

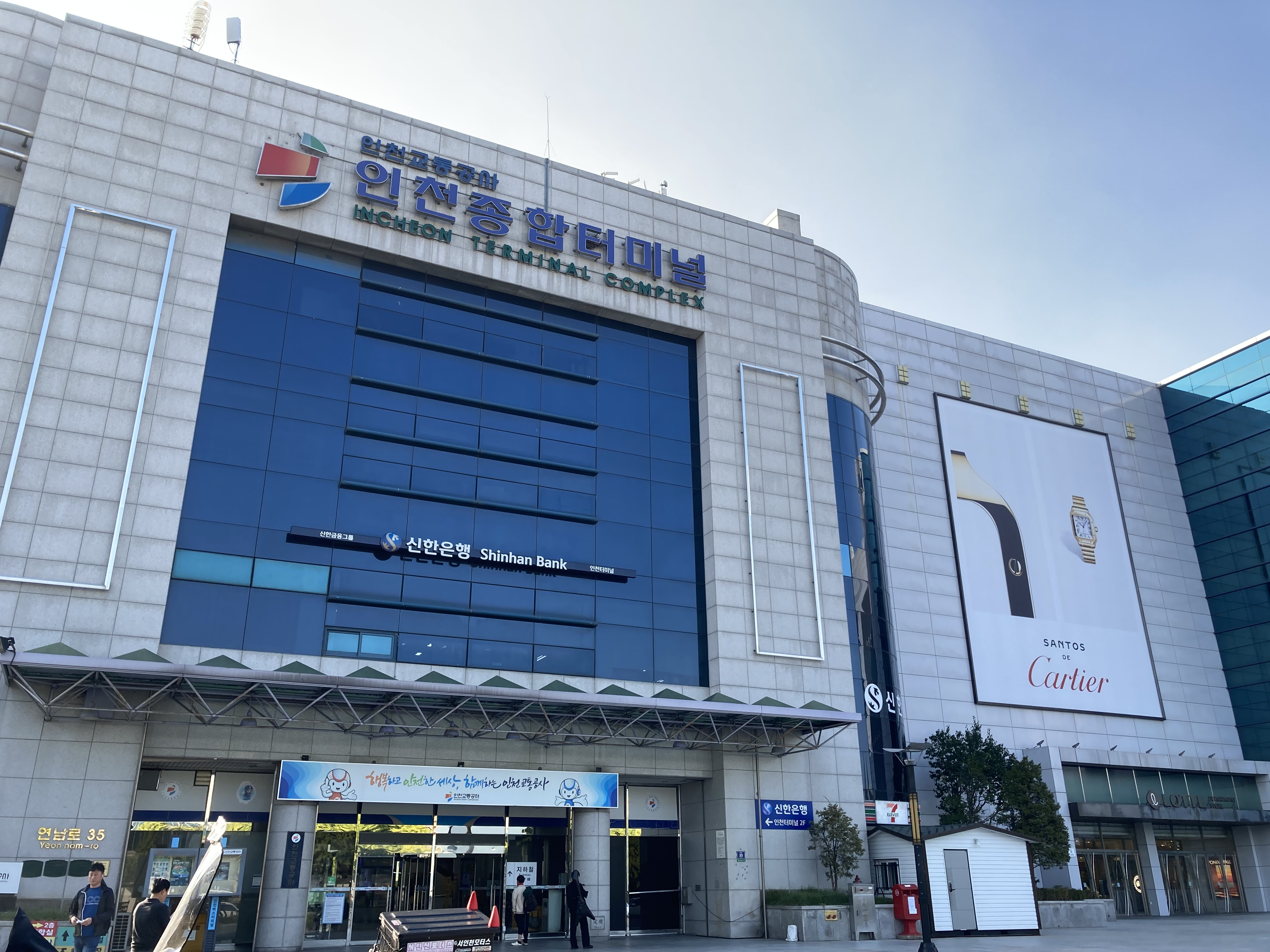
Bus Terminal

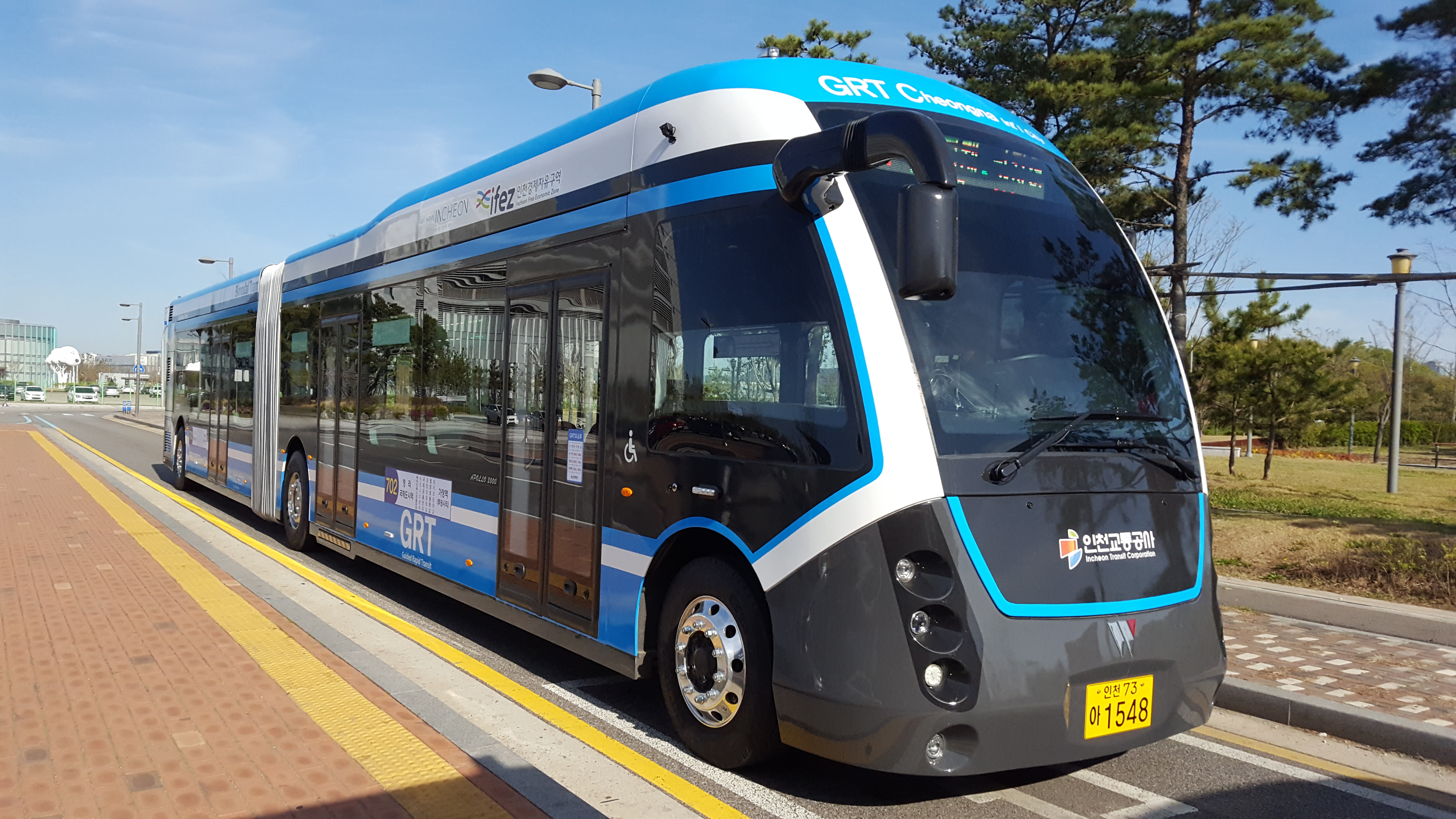
Cheongna GRT

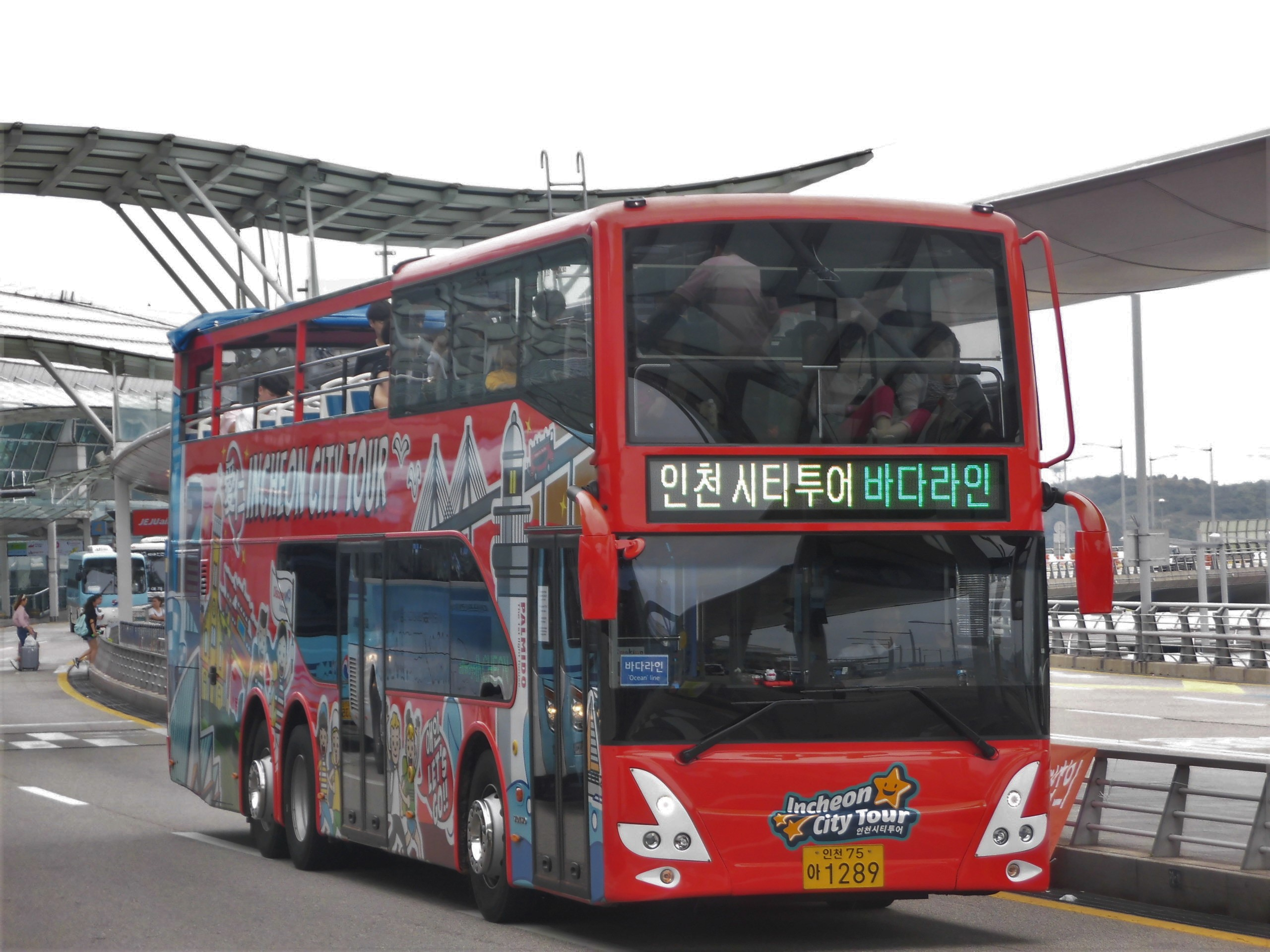
Incheon City Tour Bus

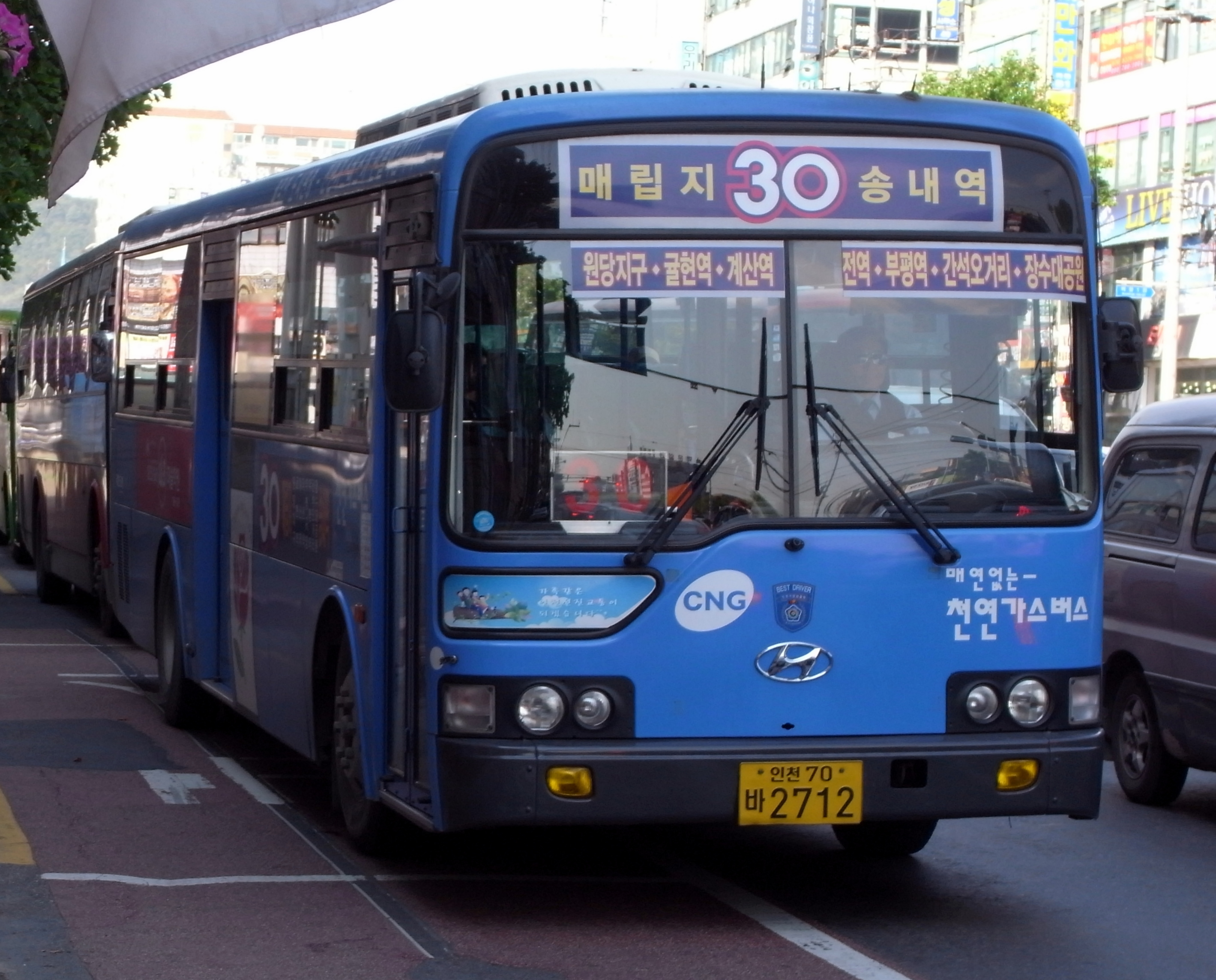
Incheon City Bus No 30

=== Trains ===
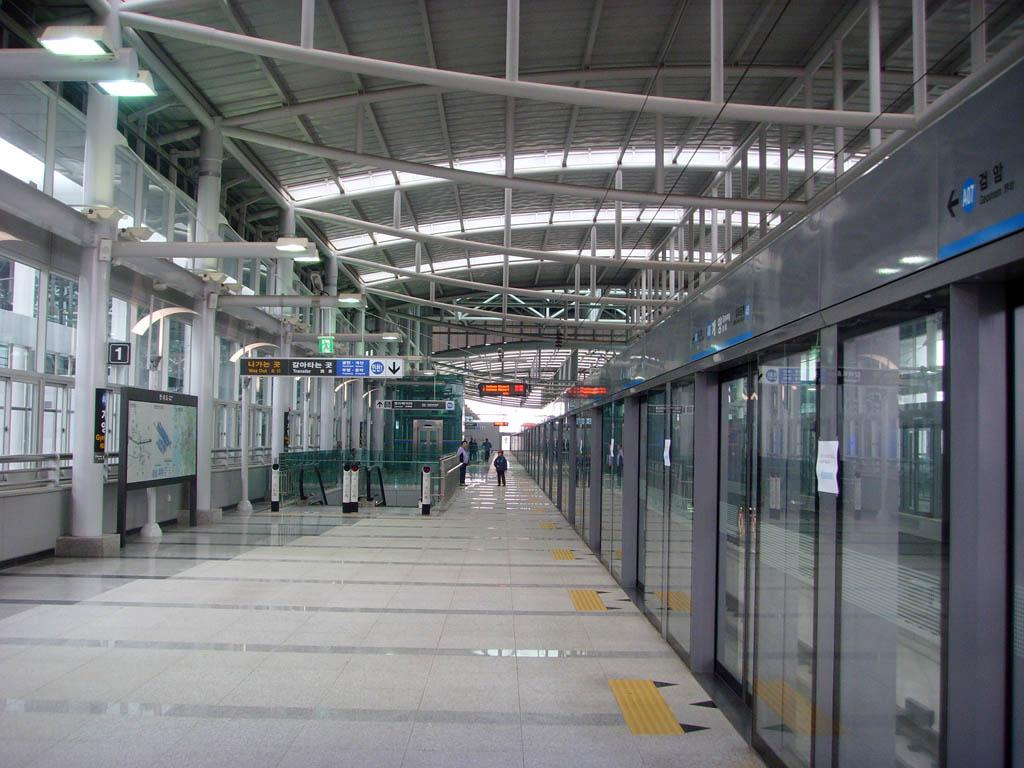
AREX Gyeyang station platform

Local service to Guro, Seoul, Cheongnyangni, Uijeongbu and Soyosan is offered by Seoul's subway Line 1. The line has 11 stations within Incheon and connects to the Incheon Subway at Bupyeong and Juan stations.

Rapid service on the same line to Yongsan station in Seoul depart from Dongincheon station and stops at major stations.

The Airport Express (AREX) line runs from Incheon International Airport to Seoul Station via Gimpo International Airport. The Incheon-Gimpo section was opened in March 2007 and was extended to Seoul station in December 2010. Passengers can choose an express service stopping only at Incheon airport and Seoul, which takes 43 minutes, or the all-station service which takes 53 minutes.

KTX service was introduced on the AREX line on 30 June 2014, with stops at Incheon International Airport station and Geomam station. There are additional plans to use the newly built Suin Line to bring KTX service to Incheon station by 2021.

=== Subway ===
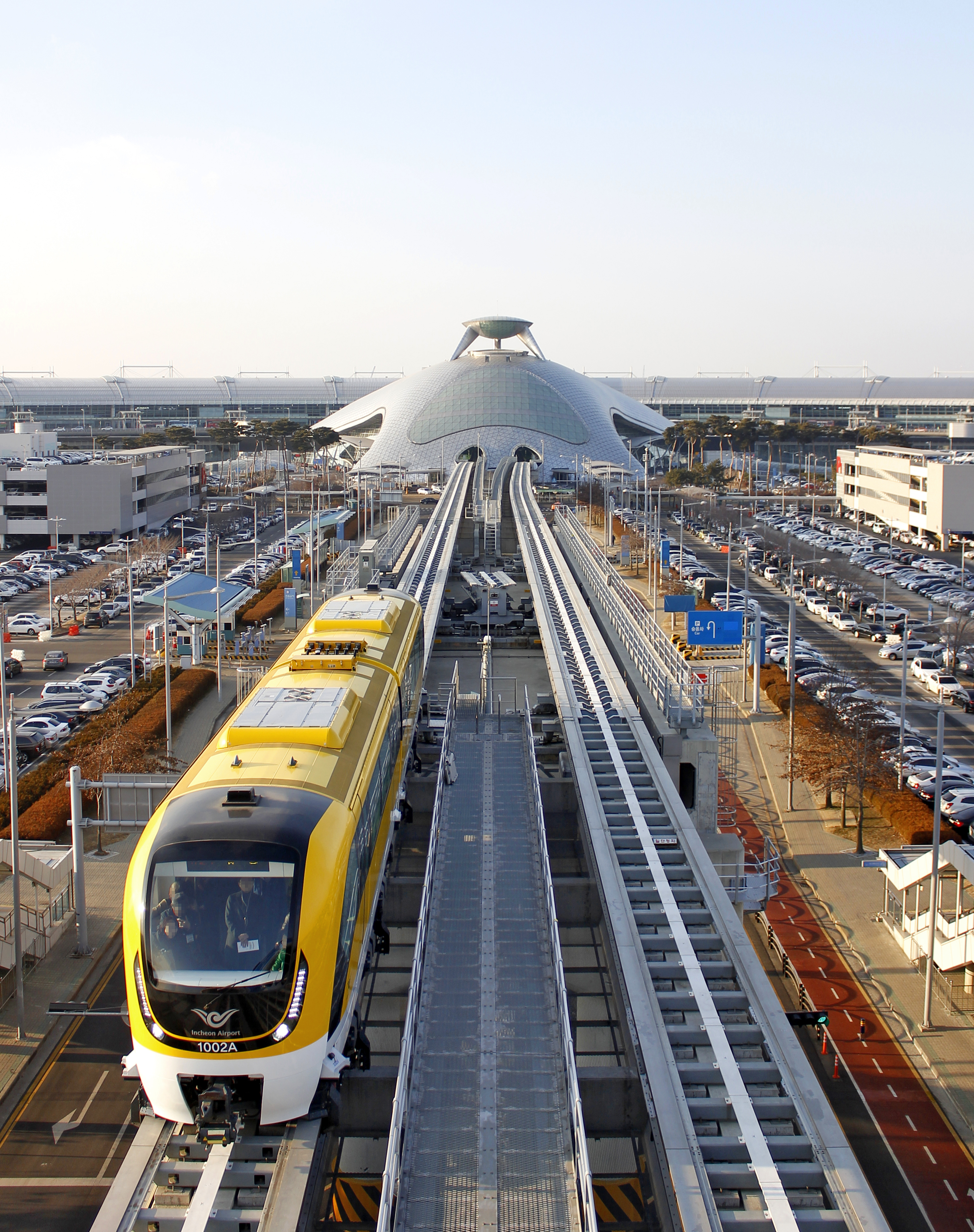
Incheon Airport Maglev

The Incheon Subway has two subway lines serving the city. The first line connects to the Seoul Metropolitan Subway system at Bupyeong station (Seoul Subway Line 1), and AREX line at Gyeyang station. It connects International Business District station in Songdo to Gyeyang station. The line has 28 stations on 29.4 kilometres (18.3 miles) of track. The line also has transfer stations with the Suin Line at Woninjae station, with the Incheon Subway Line 2 at Incheon City Hall station, and with Seoul Subway Line 7 at Bupyeong-gu Office station. Incheon Subway Line 2 opened in July 2016 and runs from Geomdan Oryu station to Unyeon station. The automated line is 29.2 kilometres (18.1 miles) long, and has 27 stations, including transfer stations at Geomam station with the AREX line, Juan station with Seoul Subway Line 1 and Incheon Subway Line 2 at Incheon City Hall station.

The Incheon subway is operated by the Incheon Rapid Transit Corporation (IRTC).

Korail has also constructed a new commuter rail line named Suin Line. The line opened in 2012 from Oido station in Siheung to Songdo station in Incheon. It was then extended in 2016, and now reaches Incheon station where passengers can transfer to Seoul Subway Line 1. In 2020, the line was extended from Oido station to Suwon Station.

SMRT (one of three operating companies of Seoul Metropolitan Subway) has extended Seoul Metropolitan Subway Line 7 to Bupyeong-gu office by 2011 and provided transfers to the Incheon Subway system. It has 3 stations within Incheon. By 2020, the line will further be extended westwards to Seoknam station where it will be possible to transfer to Incheon Subway Line 2.

== Free Economic Zone ==
Incheon Free Economic Zone

The Incheon Free Economic Zone (IFEZ) comprises the regions of Songdo, Cheongna, and Yeongjong Island, covering a total area of 51,739 acres (20,938 hectares). IFEZ was established to develop these areas into centres for logistics, international business, leisure, and tourism, aimed primarily at the Northeast Asian region. The designation of "Free Economic Zone" refers to efforts to enhance the business environment for foreign enterprises and improve living conditions for expatriates. It was the first zone of its kind in South Korea, formally designated in August 2003. The region includes infrastructure for air and sea transportation, logistics, international business, financial services, and residential facilities, alongside educational, medical, and leisure amenities.

=== New Songdo City ===
Development of Songdo International City began in 1994 on reclaimed land and has been intended as a centre for international business, trade, technology, and environmentally conscious urban living. Initially projected to be completed by 2020, some areas continue to be under development, with evolving projects and adjustments to the original master plan. Songdo houses various multinational companies and hosts several international institutions, including the Green Climate Fund. The city is also recognised for its smart city technologies and eco-friendly design, featuring extensive green spaces, smart infrastructure, and advanced waste management systems.

- Development area: 13,162 acres (53.26 km^{2})
- Planned population: 252,000 persons

=== Yeongjong Island ===
As of 2012, Yeongjong International City, centred around Incheon International Airport, has been under development as an eco-friendly airport city. Originally scheduled for completion by 2020, certain projects are still ongoing as the area continues to evolve. The development aims to combine logistical facilities with residential, business, and tourism sectors, leveraging its proximity to the airport.

- Development area: 34,183 acres (138.33 km^{2})

=== Cheongna ===
Cheongna, located on the mainland near Yeongjong Island, is designed to focus on entertainment and leisure. It includes residential zones, sports facilities, and a business district catering to international finance. Although initially slated for completion by 2008, development timelines have since been extended, with some projects, such as the theme park, still in the planning or early construction stages.

- Development Size: 4,394 acres (17.78 km^{2})
- Planned population: 90,000 persons
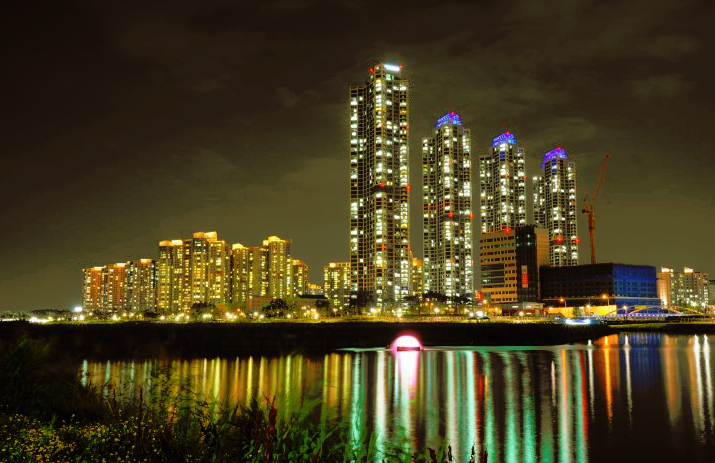
Cheongna District

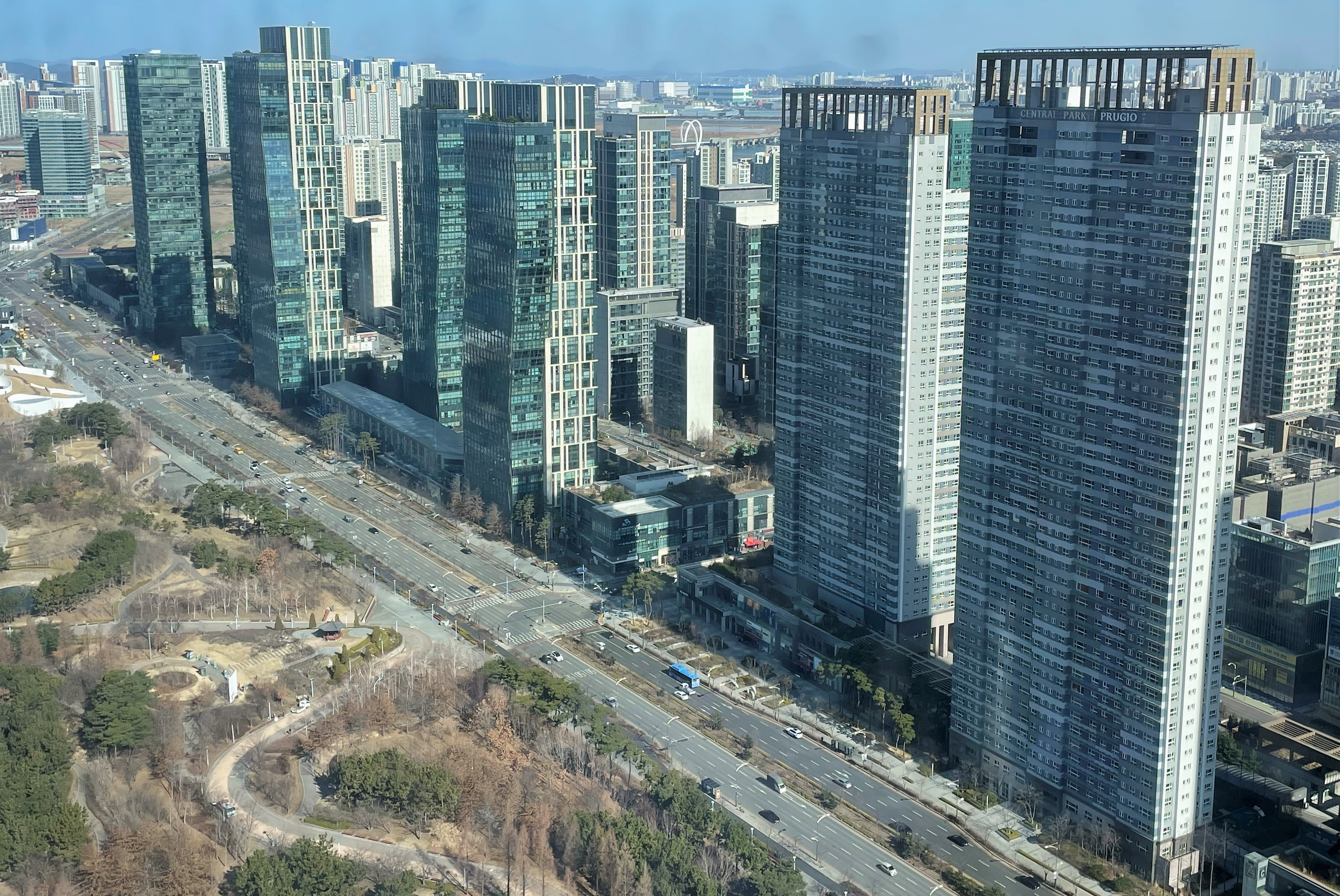
Songdo International City

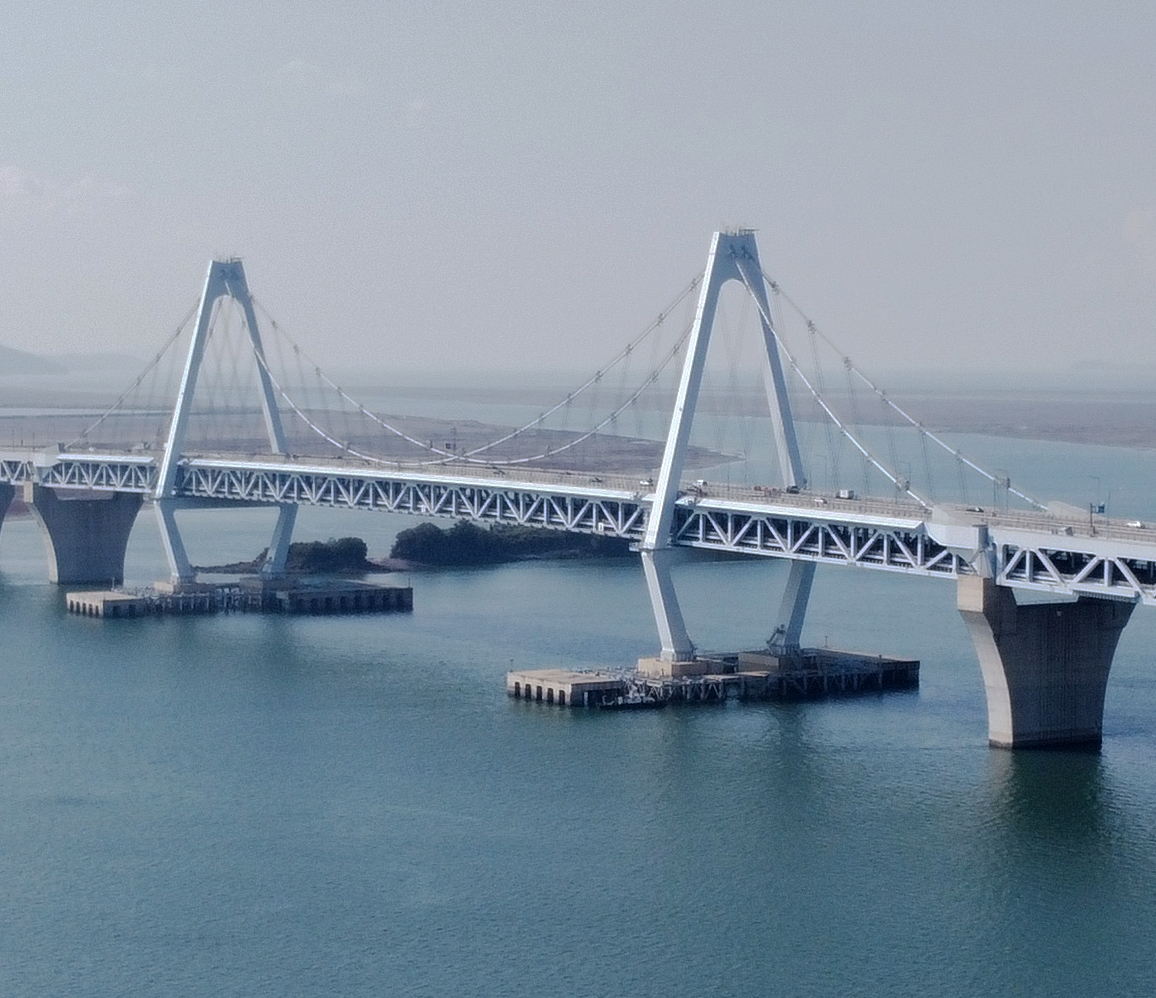
Yeongjong Bridge

== Administrative divisions ==
Administrative divisions

Incheon is divided into 9 districts (gu) and 2 counties (gun).

- Bupyeong District
- Geomdan District
- Gyeyang District
- Jemulpo District
- Michuhol District
- Namdong District
- Seohae District
- Yeonsu District
- Yeongjong District
- Ganghwa County (강화군; 江華郡)
- Ongjin County (옹진군; 甕津郡)

== Demographics ==
Religion in Incheon (2024)
1. Not religious (52.0%)
2. Protestantism (22.0%)
3. Catholicism (12.0%)
4. Buddhism (12.0%)
5. Others (2.00%)

Historical population
Year	Pop.	±%
1970	634,046	—
1980	1,083,906	+71.0%
1990	1,817,919	+67.7%
2000	2,475,139	+36.2%
2010	2,662,509	+7.6%
2020	2,945,454	+10.6%

According to the 2015 census, 32.6% of the population follow Christianity (23.1% Protestantism and 9.5% Catholicism) and 8.7% follow Buddhism. 57.9% of the population is irreligious. 0.8% of the population follow other religions including Islam, Muism, and Confucianism.

== Sports ==
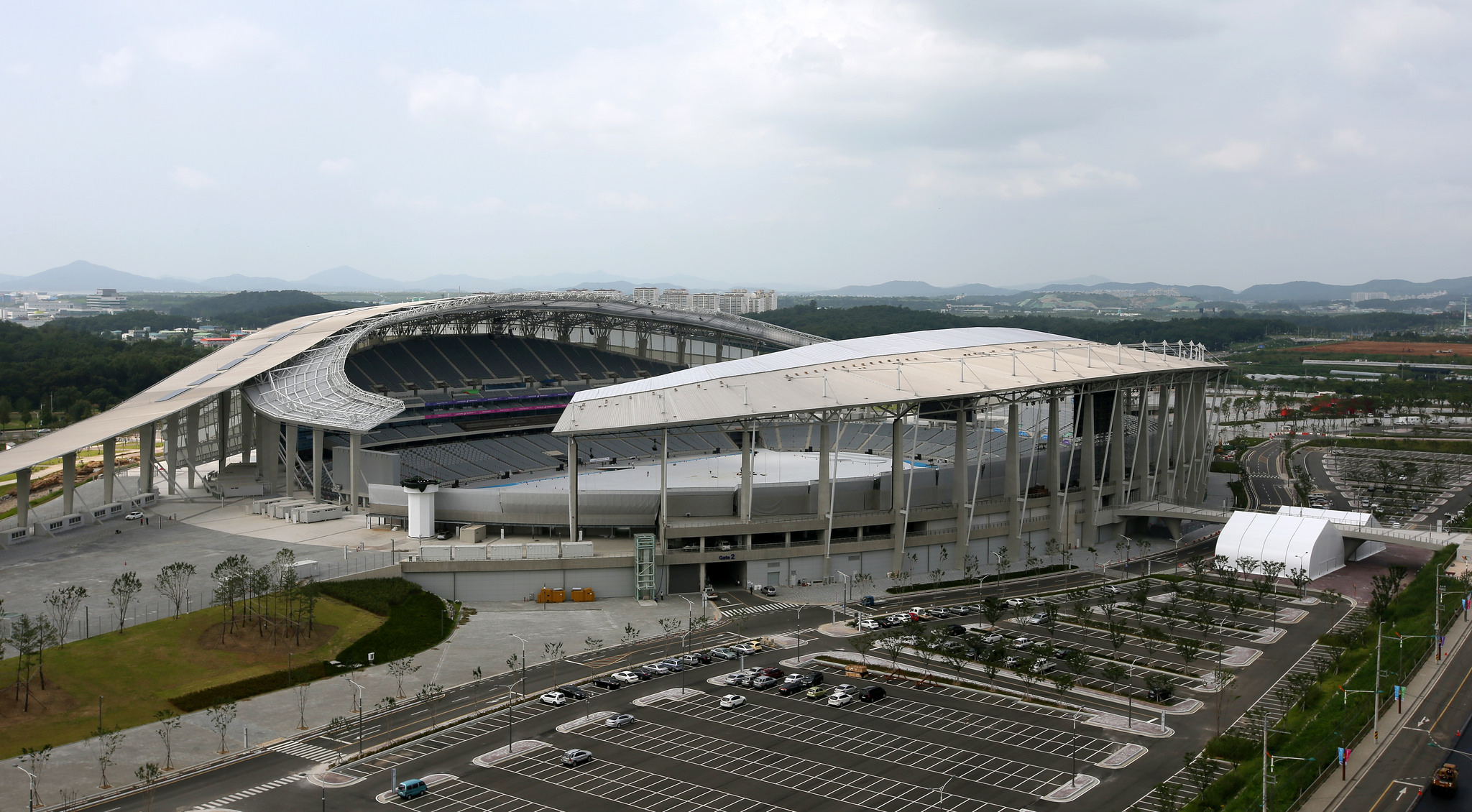
Incheon Asiad Main Stadium, main stadium of 2014 Asian Games

Incheon is home to the following professional and semi-professional sports teams:

Association football

The K League 1 team Incheon United FC was founded in 2003. The club was known to have a rivalry against former Bucheon SK (now Jeju SK FC) due to the teams' close geographical relationship. The K4 League team FC Namdong is based in the Namdong District of Incheon.

The WK League women's team is called the Hyundai Steel Red Angels.

Baseball

The KBO League team SSG Landers. The first Incheon-based professional baseball team were Sammi Superstars.

Basketball

The WKBL team Incheon Shinhan Bank S-Birds is based in Incheon. Between 1997 and 2021, Incheon hosted the KBL team Incheon Electroland Elephants.

Volleyball

The V-League teams are Incheon Korean Air Jumbos (men's) and Incheon Heungkuk Life Pink Spiders (women's).

Munhak Sports Complex

The Munhak Sports Complex houses both a football stadium and a baseball stadium. The football stadium was Incheon's venue for the 2002 Football World Cup, and is also the home venue for Incheon United. The baseball stadium is the home venue for the SSG Landers.

In April 2007, Incheon was selected as the host city for the 2014 Asian Games, beating out New Delhi.

Yeonhui Cricket Ground

Yeonhui Cricket Ground is a purpose-built cricket stadium in Incheon built for cricket events at the 2014 Asian Games. The 2014 Asian Games featured cricket for both the men's and the women's event and this ground was used for the scheduled cricket matches played at the games. It is the first cricket stadium in South Korea.

Incheon Football Stadium (Sungui Arena)

Incheon Football Stadium is the first football-only stadium in Incheon. It was built in 2012 with a capacity for 20,891 spectators.

== Tourism ==
=== Nature ===
- Incheon administers several of Korea's western islands, including Ganghwa Island, Yeongjong Island, and Baengnyeongdo, with Baengnyeongdo being South Korea's westernmost point.
- Jakyakdo Island: A small island located between Wolmido and Yeongjongdo. Visitors can enjoy scenic walks, picnic spots, a restaurant, and seasonal accommodation.

=== Traditional buildings ===
- Jeondeungsa: Oldest Buddhist temple in Korea
- Incheon Dohobu Cheongsa: The former government complex of Incheon, dating back to at least the reign of King Sejong in the 15th century. It is located near Munhak Stadium.

=== Modern facilities ===
- Incheon Chinatown: Korea's only official Chinatown, situated across from Incheon Station, close to Jayu Park, offering a taste of Chinese culture and cuisine.
- Wolmido: A former military site at Green Beach, used during the Incheon Landing. It is now a popular tourist destination with a boardwalk, amusement park, and seafood restaurants. Ferries to Yeongjongdo and Jakyakdo depart from here.
- Jayu Park: Established in 1888, it is the first Western-style park of Korea. It is home to a statue of General Douglas MacArthur and a memorial marking the centennial of U.S.-Korea relations.
- Songwol-dong Fairy Tale Village: Created as part of a renovation project, this village is now a popular attraction.
- Baedari Secondhand Bookstore Alley: Historical space in Dongu-gu housing multiple bookstores.
- Ara Canal: A waterway linking the Han River to the Yellow Sea. The canal is bordered by parks and a popular bike path.
- Incheon Grand Park: Biggest park in the Seoul metropolitan area
- Bupyeong Station: A major transport hub where Seoul Subway Line 1 and Incheon Subway Line intersect. Bupyeong is known for its vast underground shopping centre, featuring 1,408 stores over 31,692 square metres (as recorded by the National Archives of Korea). This centre was recognised by the American World Record Academy in 2014 for having the largest number of stores in the world. Above ground, Bupyeong offers a lively mix of restaurants, shops, and a Lotte Mart.
- Incheon Bus Terminal Area: Centred around the city's bus terminal, this area also features a subway station and a performance venue. The bustling Rodeo Street in Guwol-dong is lined with restaurants, department stores, and shops.
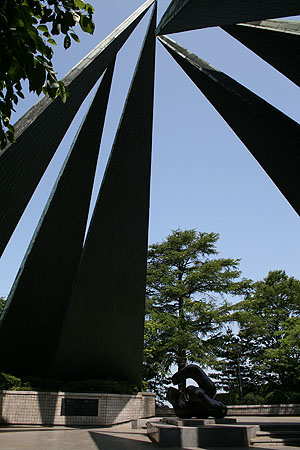
Monument to 100 years of friendship between Korea and the US in Jayu Park

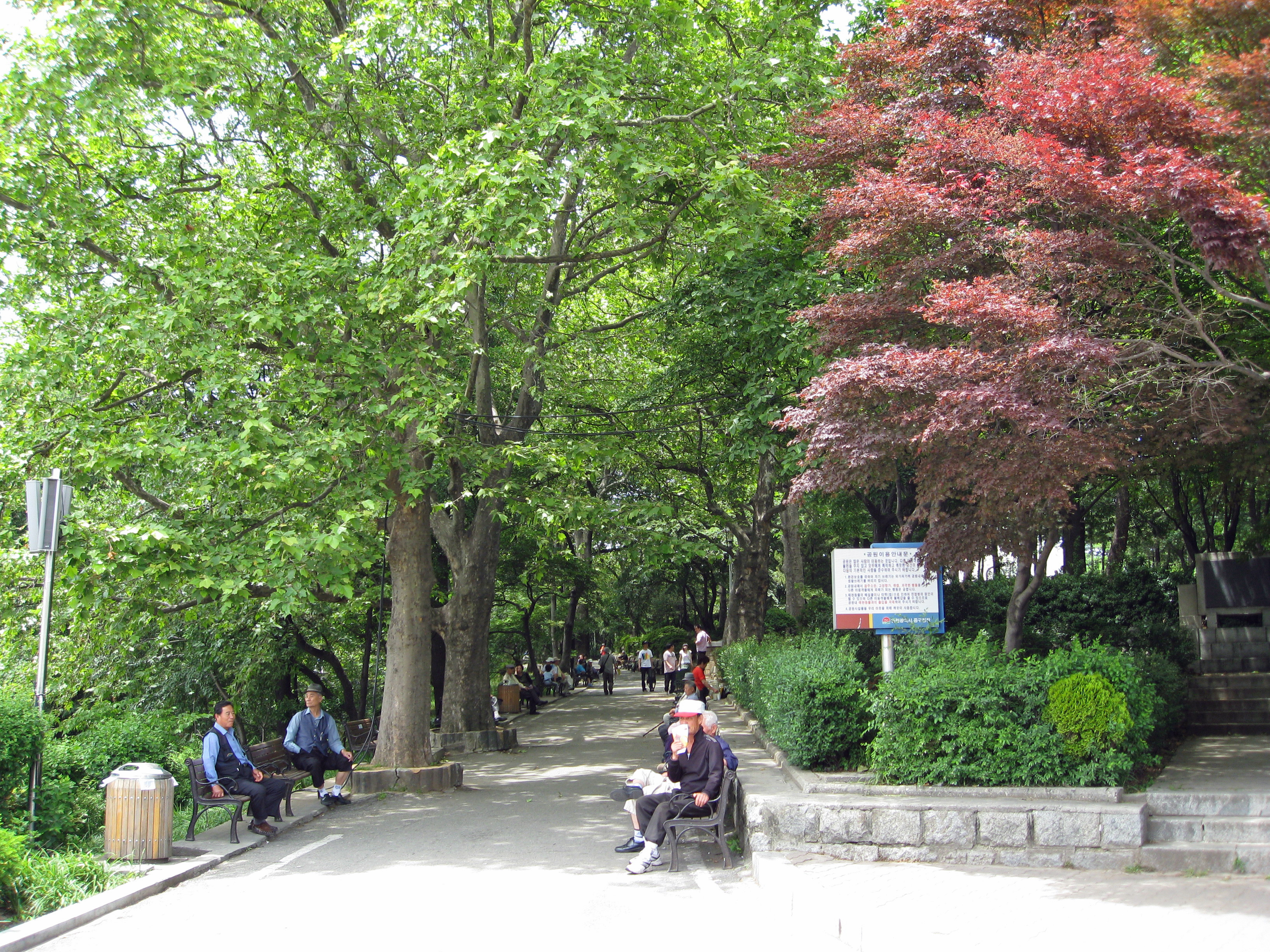
A walkway in Jayu Park

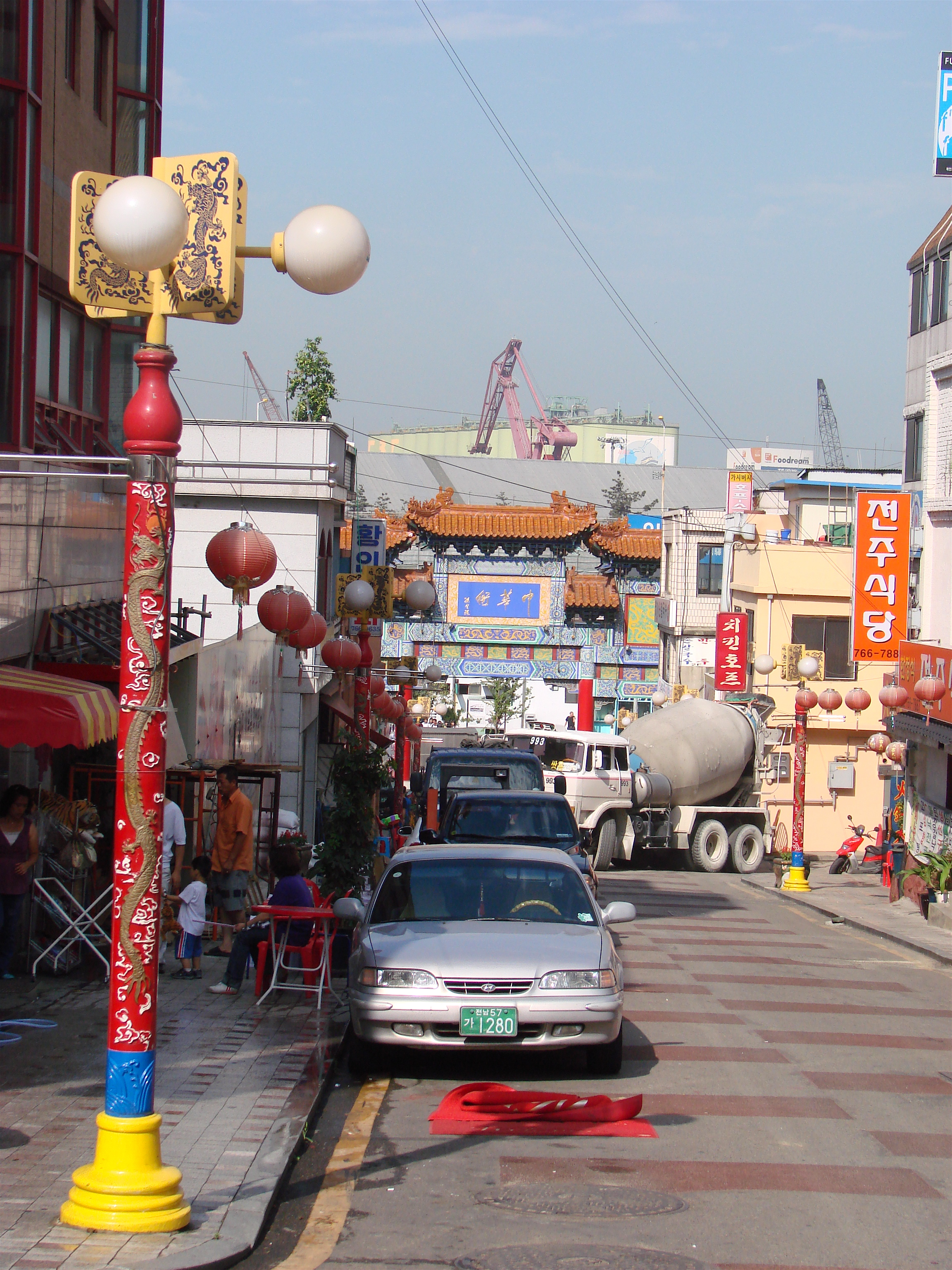
The only official Chinatown in South Korea

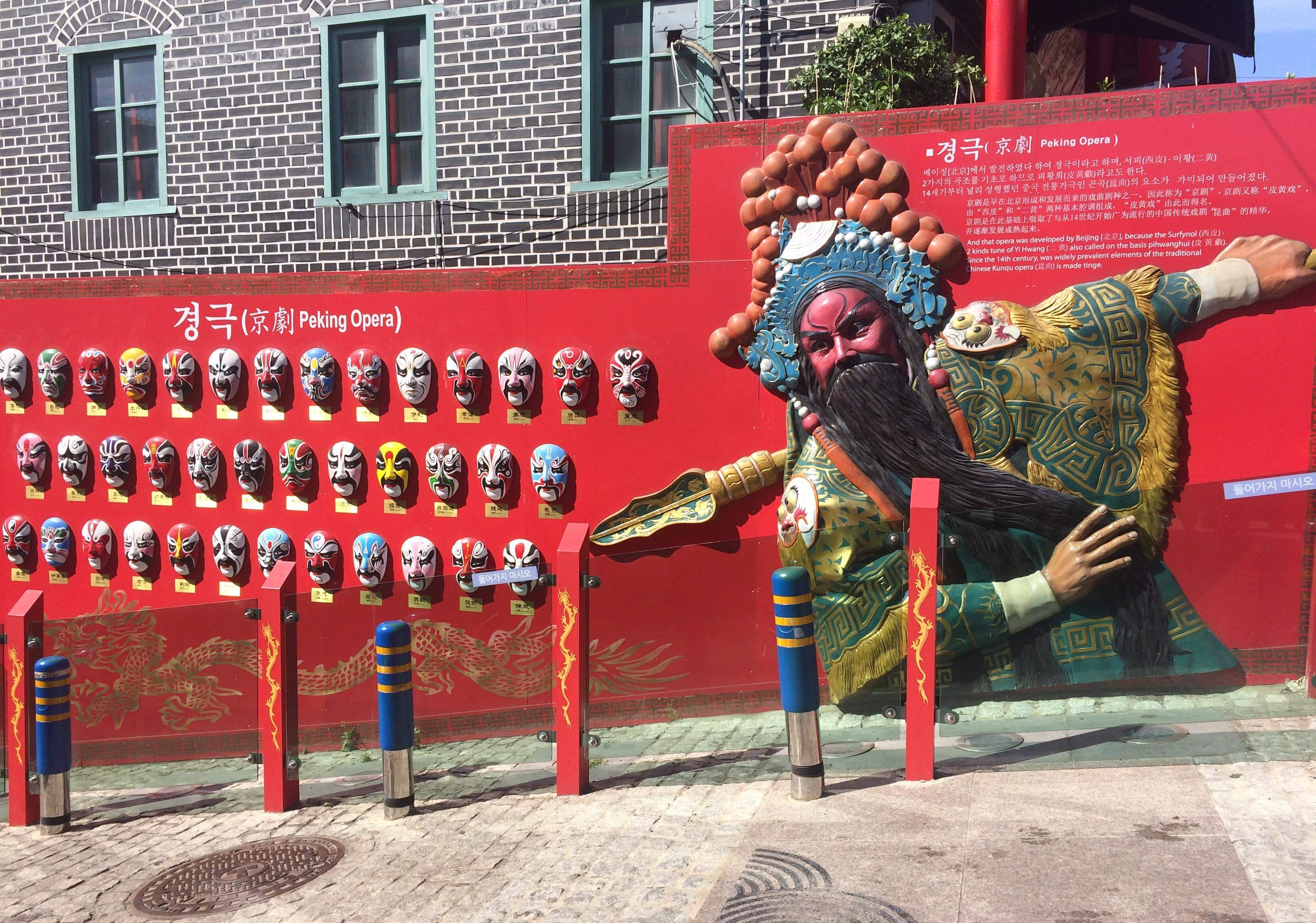
Peking Opera wall Chinatown, Incheon, South Korea

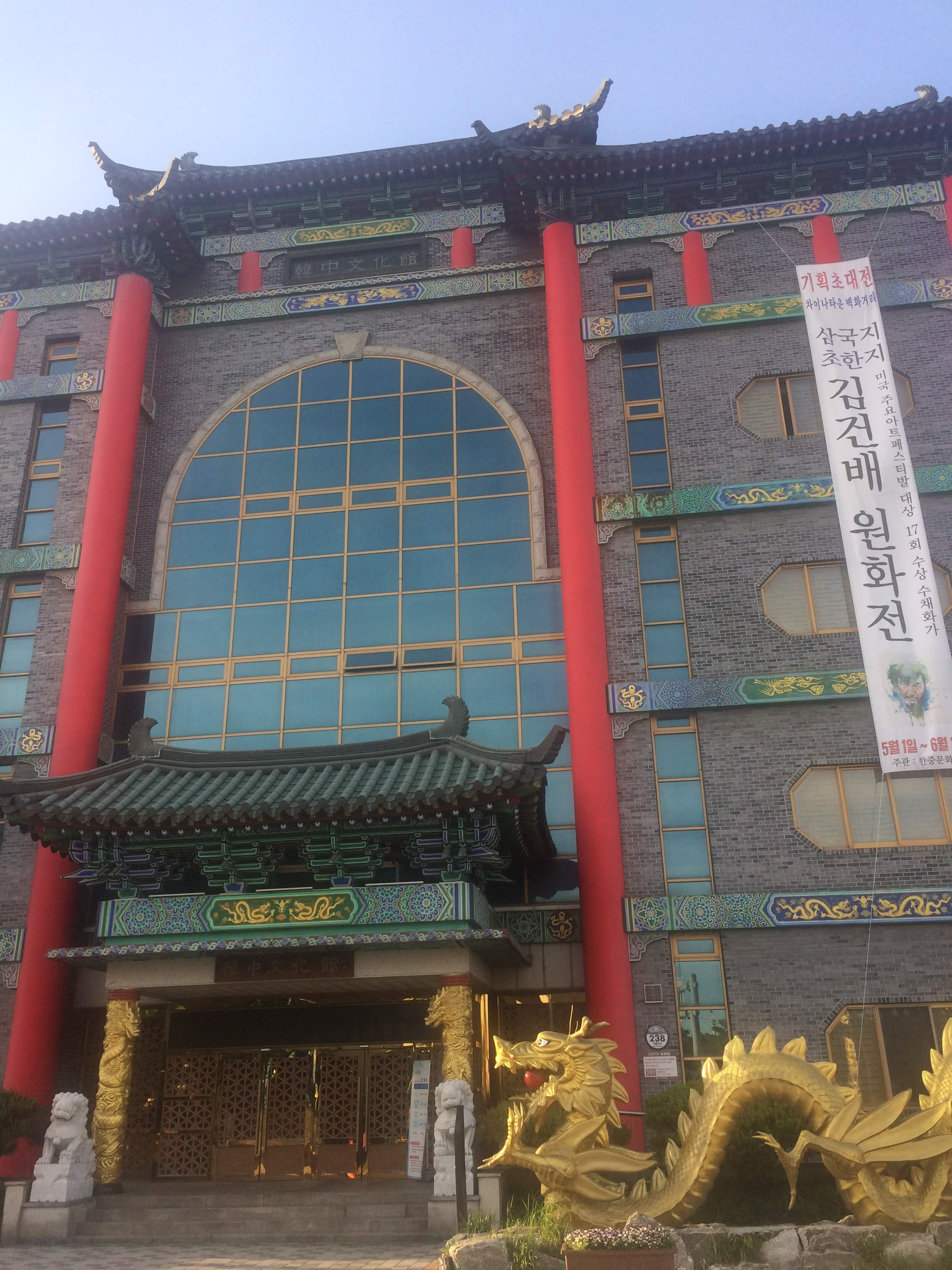
Korean-Chinese cultural center Chinatown in South Korea

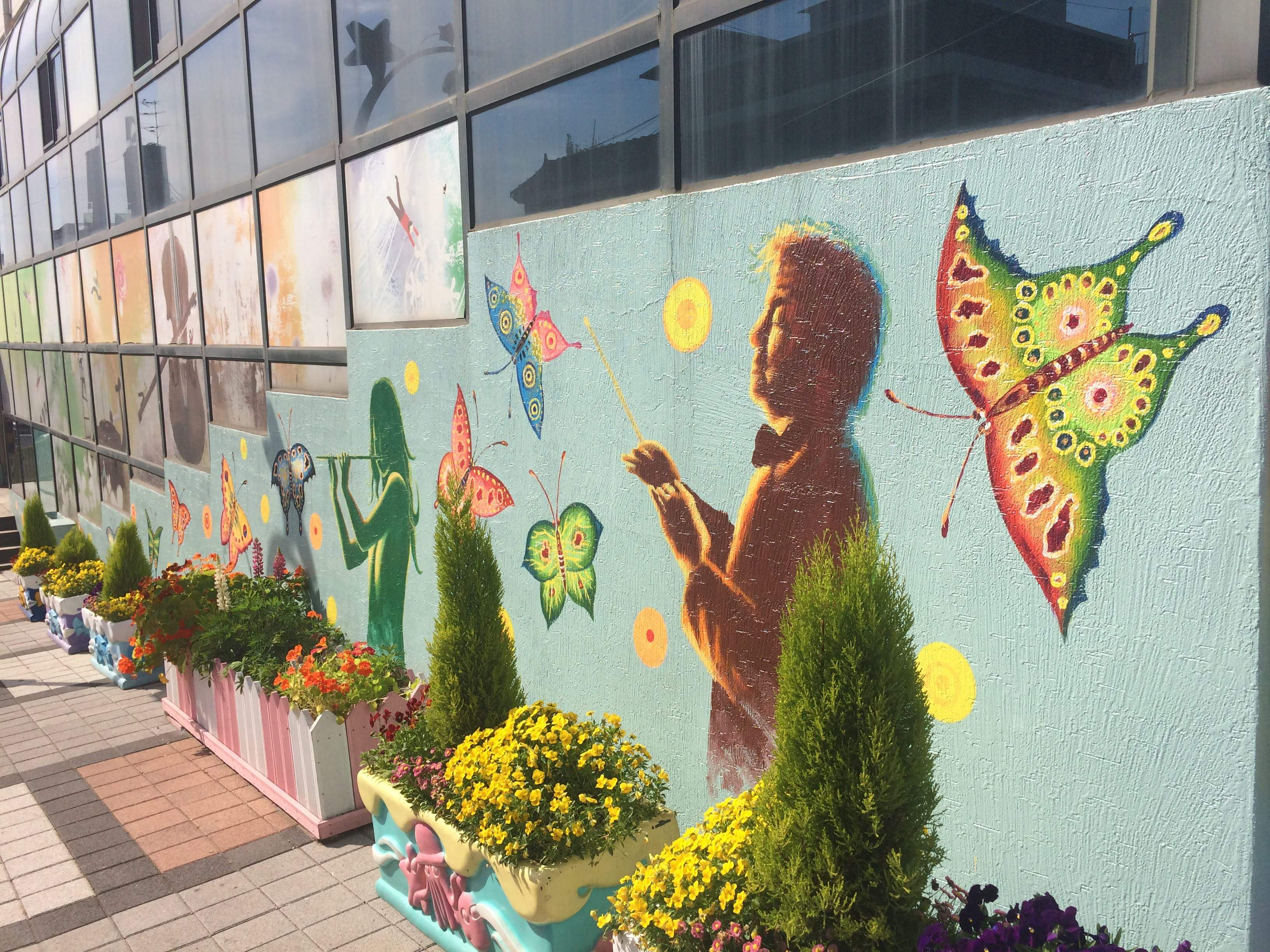
Songwol-dong Fairy Tale Village in Incheon in South Korea

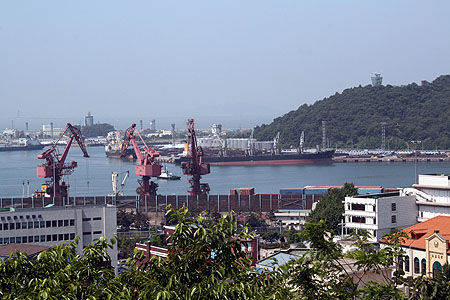
Port of Incheon

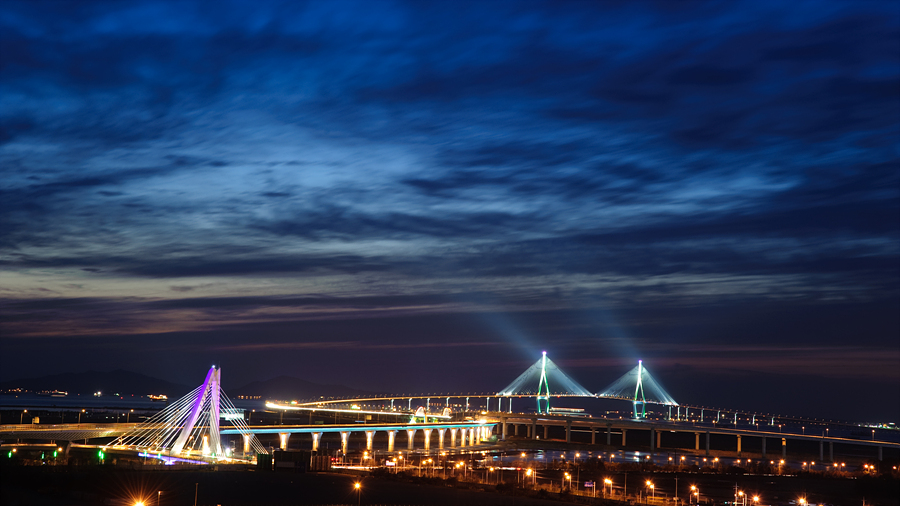
Incheon Bridge

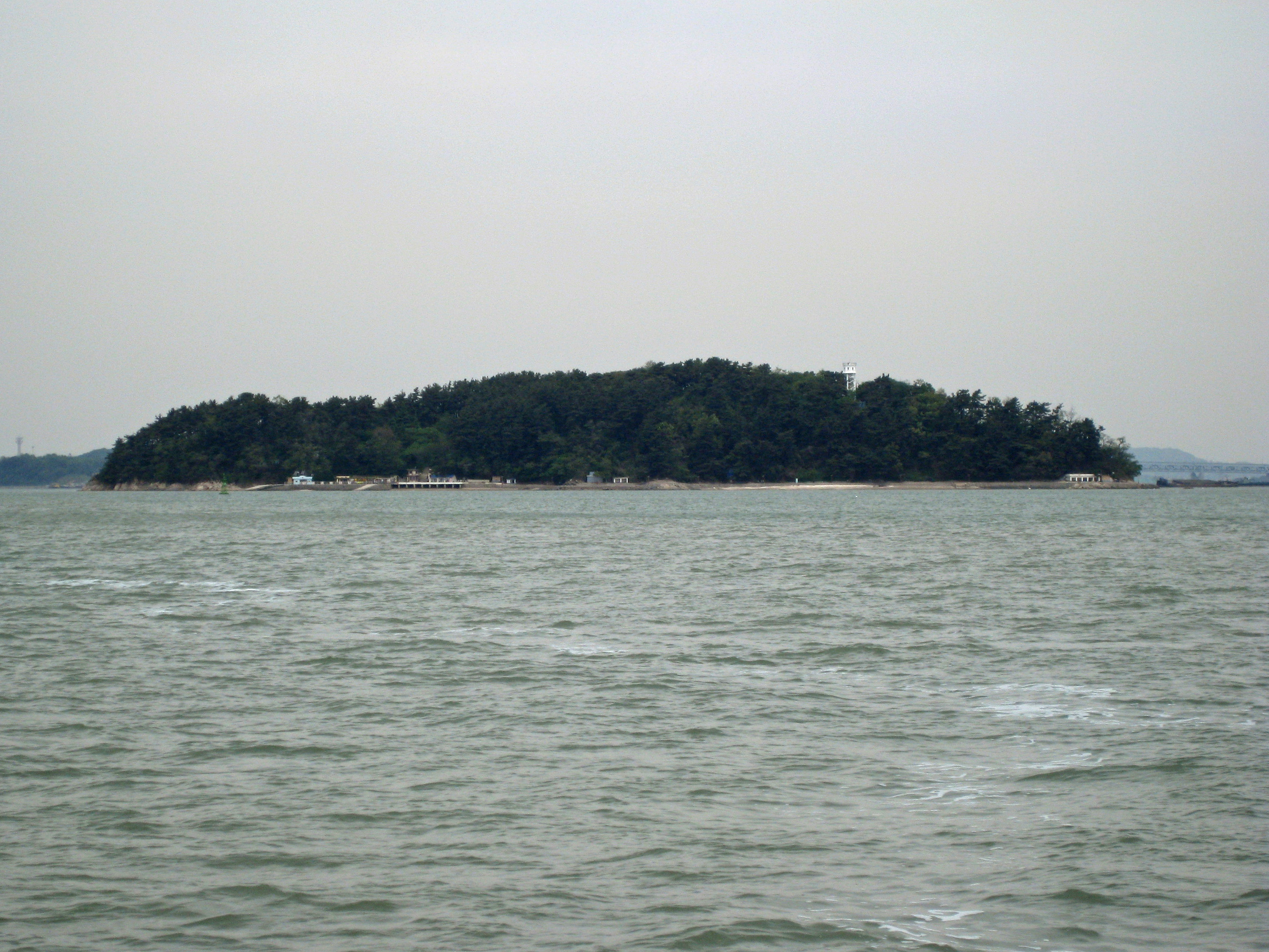
The tiny island of Jakyakdo

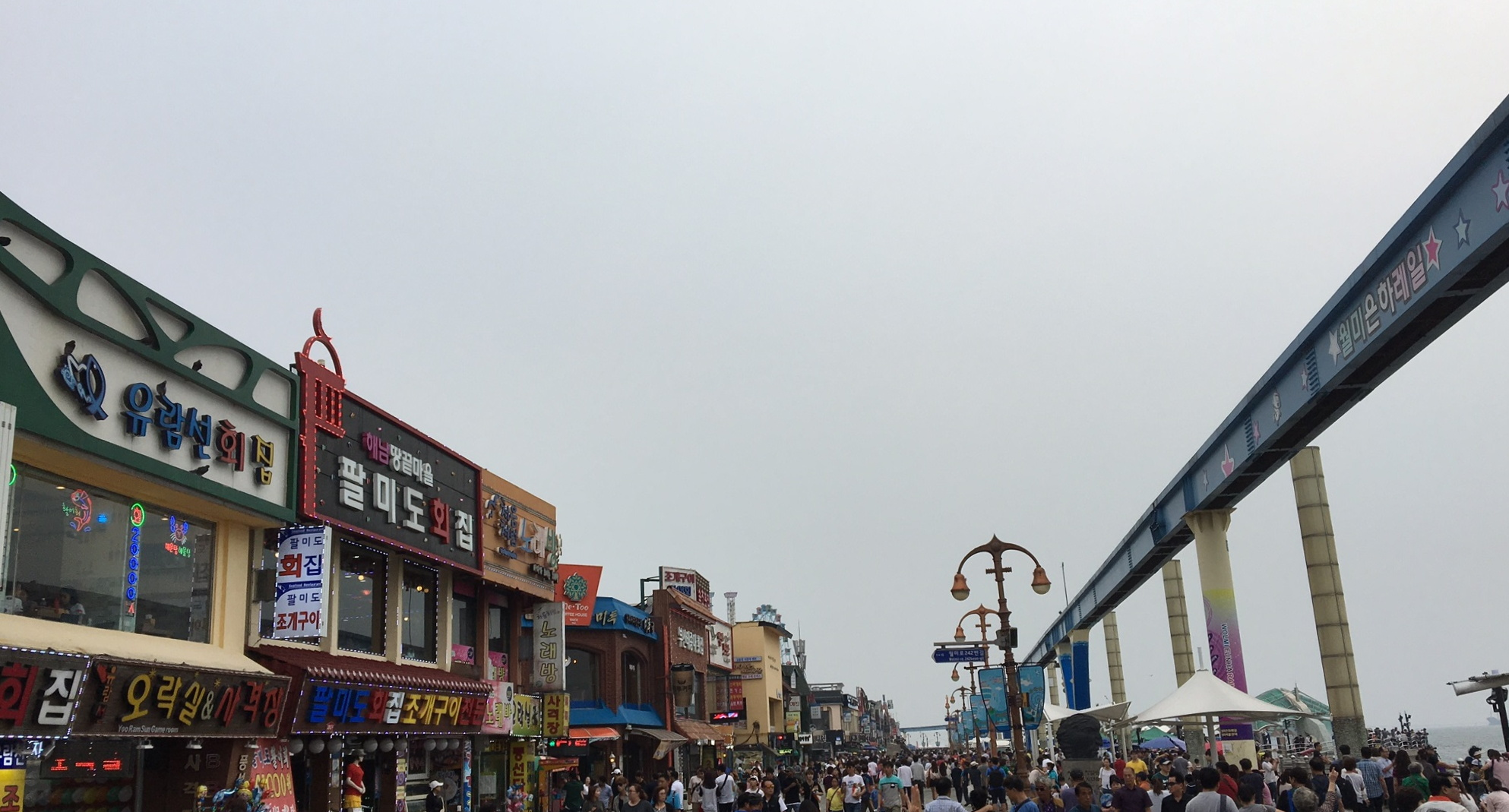
Wolmido promenade

Incheon International Airport

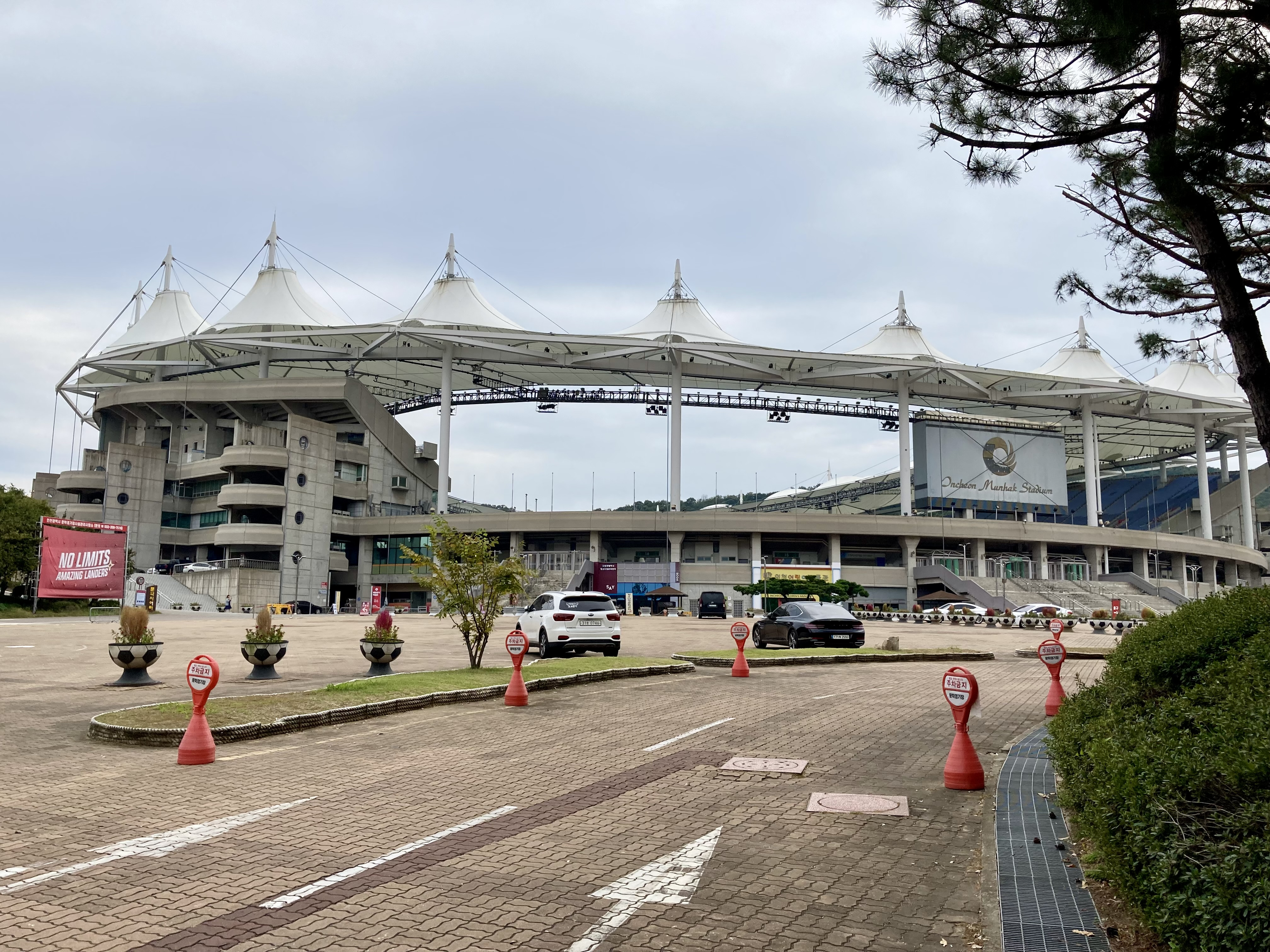
Incheon Munhak Stadium

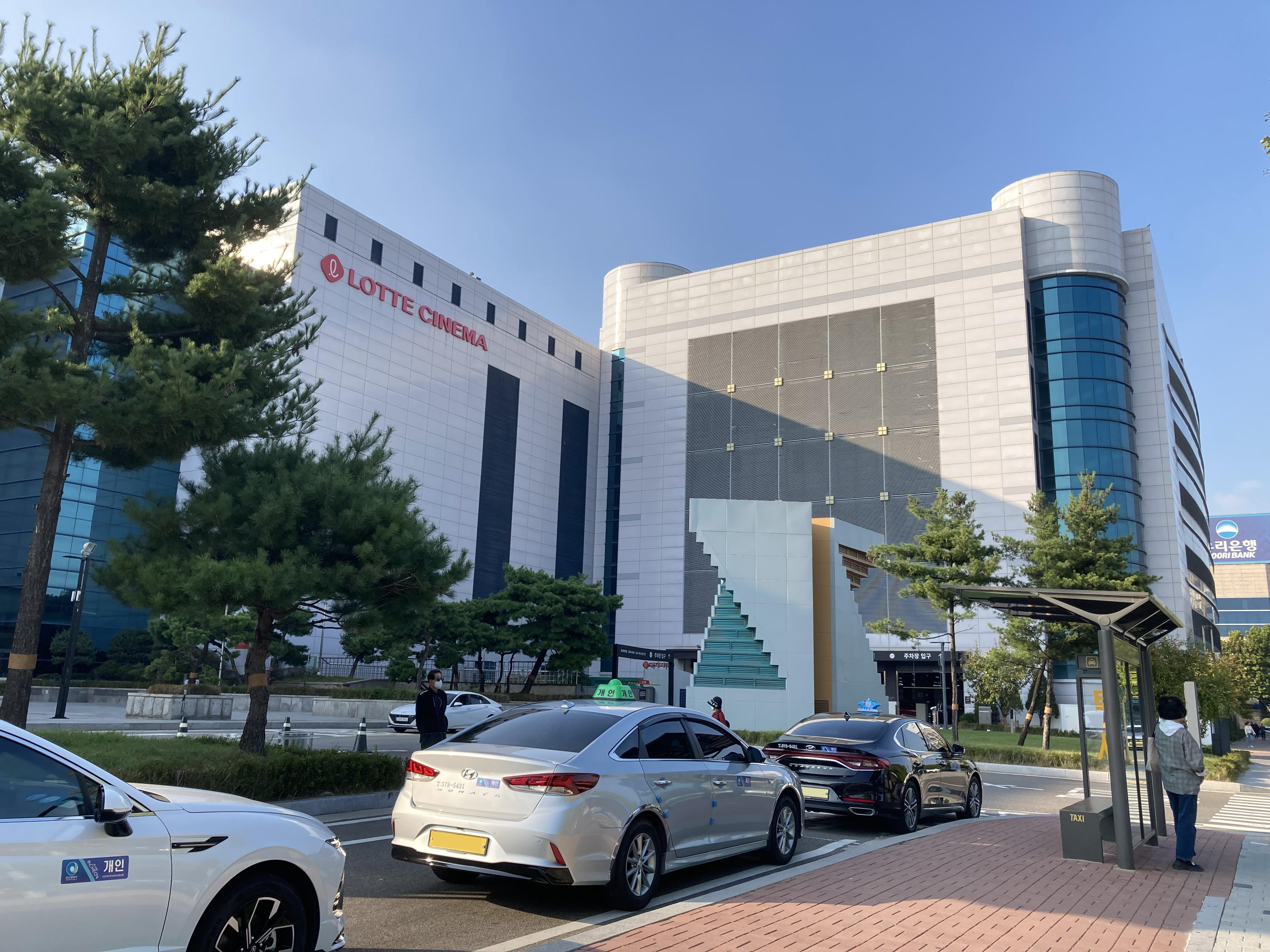
Lotte Department & Incheon Bus Terminal

Park Taehwan Swimming Stadium

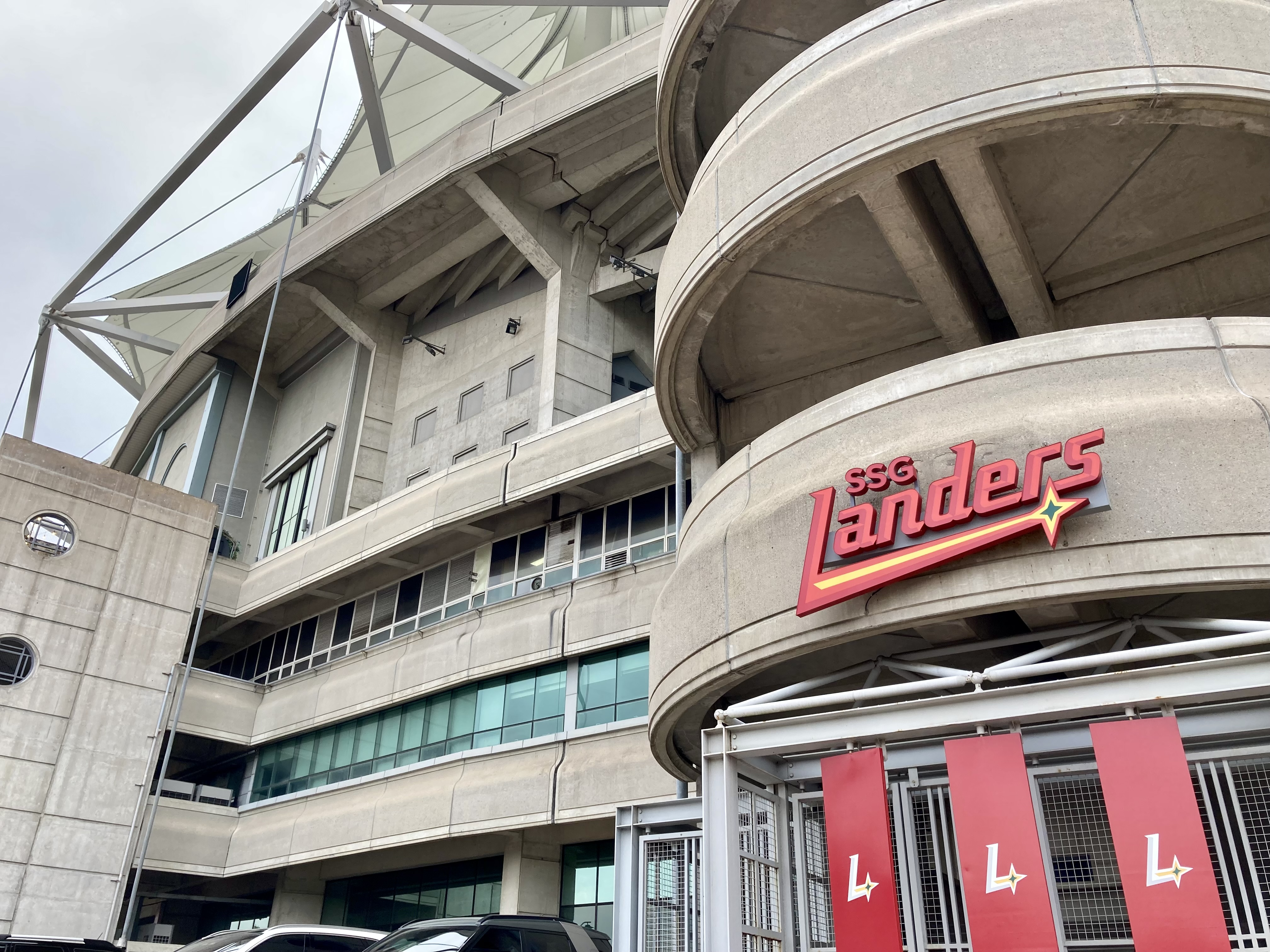
Incheon Munhak Stadium (SSG Landers Baseball Team Home)

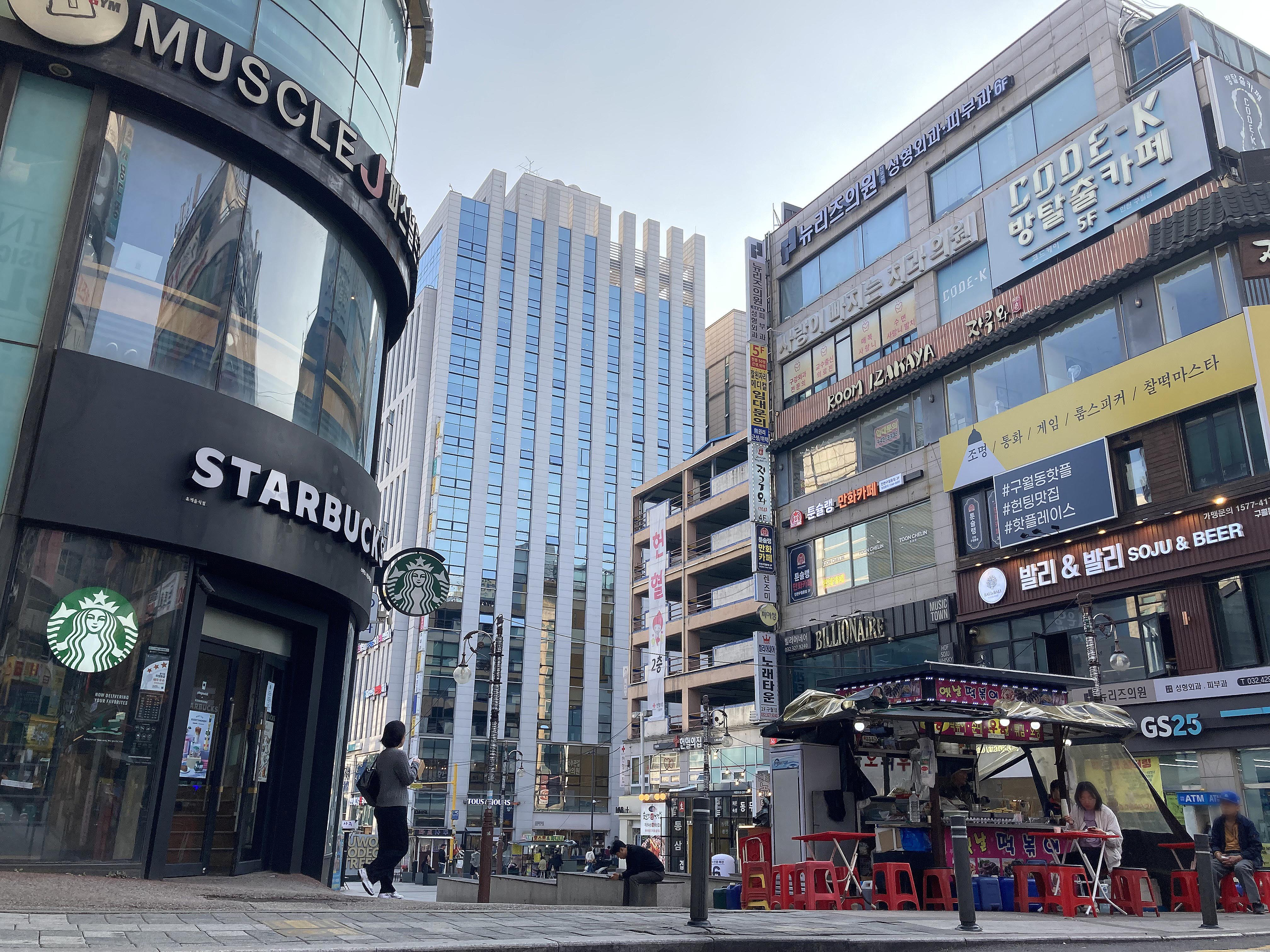
Guwol Rodeo Street

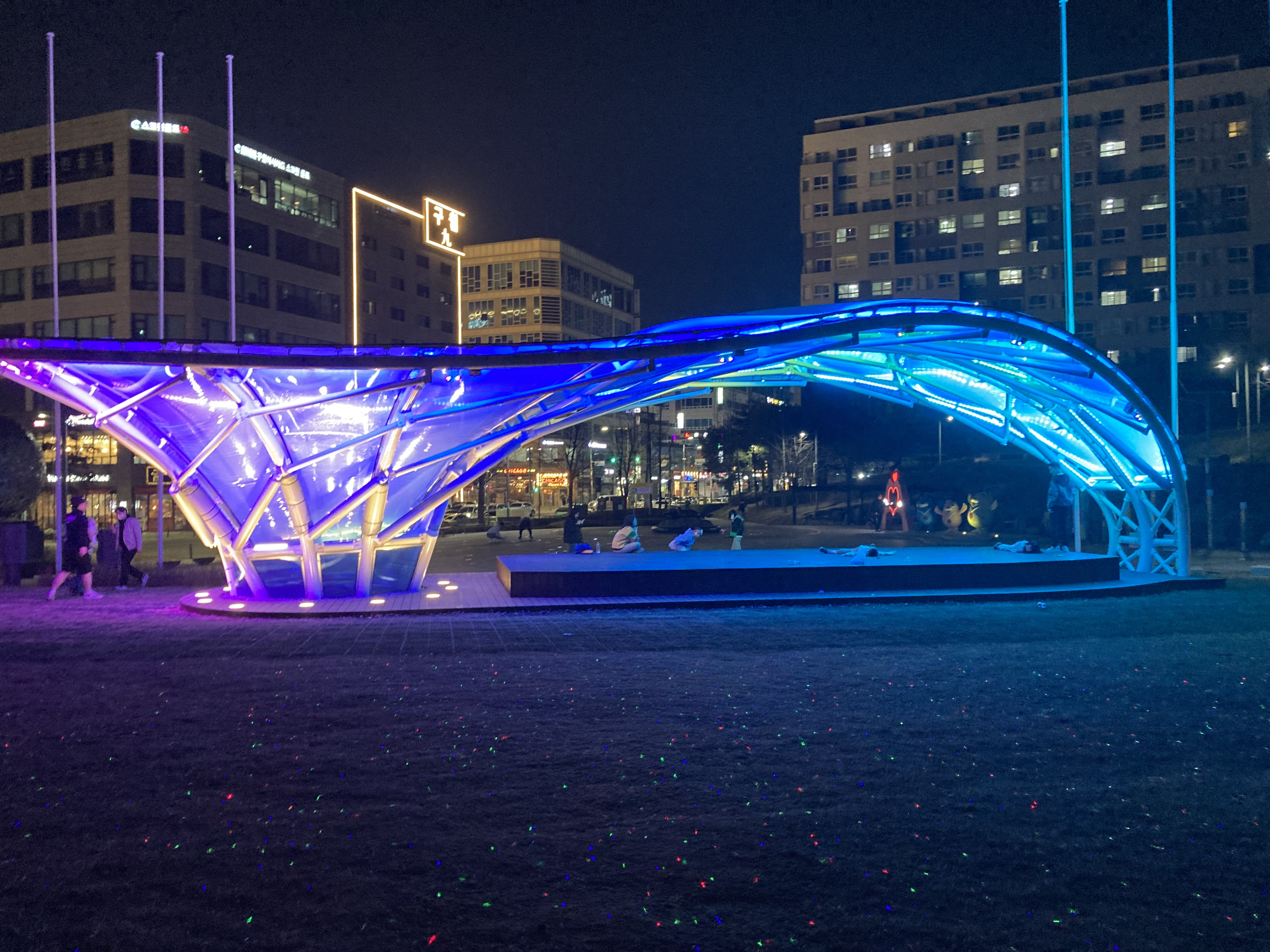
Guwol Asiad Park at Night (2014 Asian Games Park)

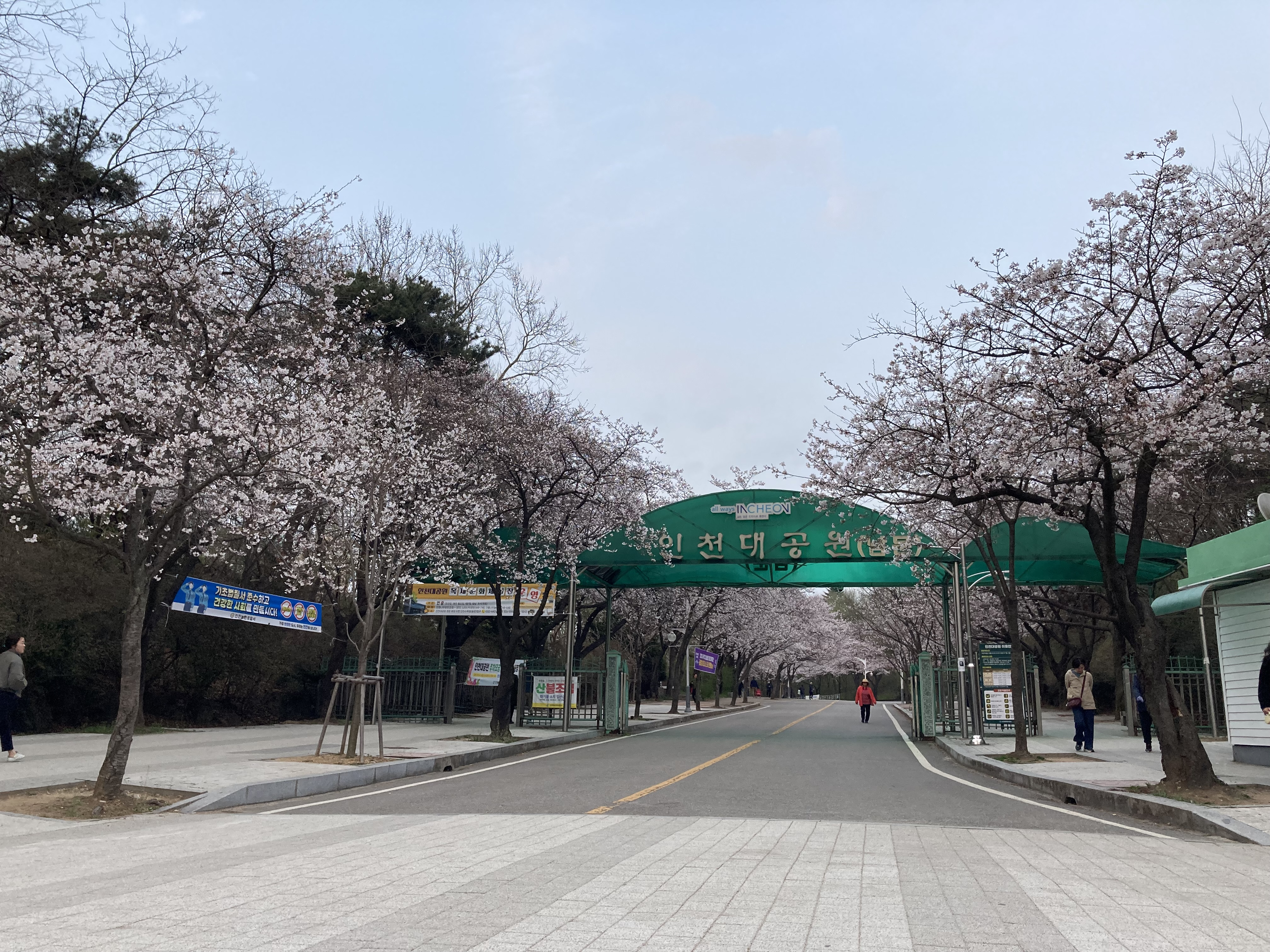
Incheon Grand Park

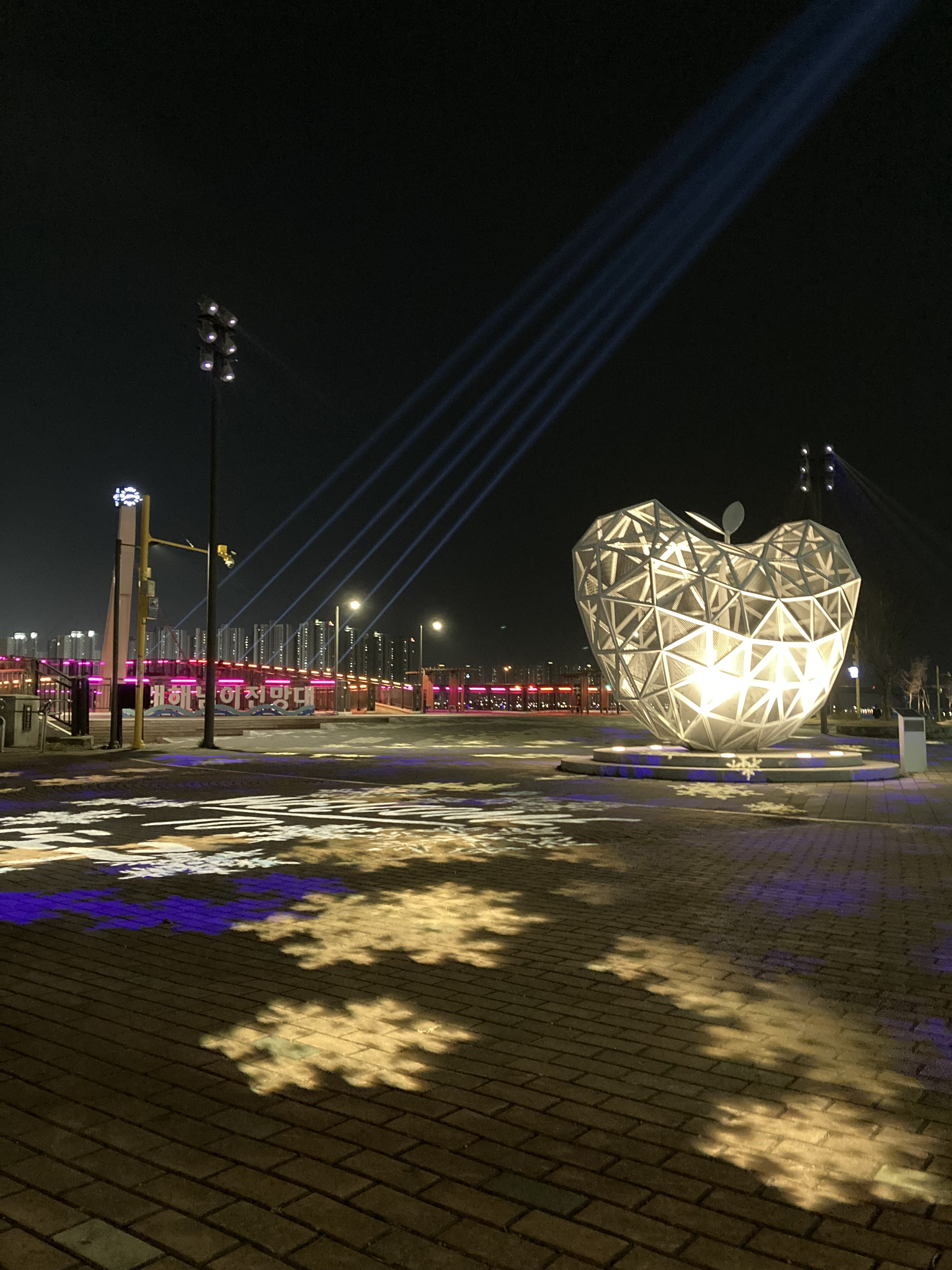
Sorae Bridge

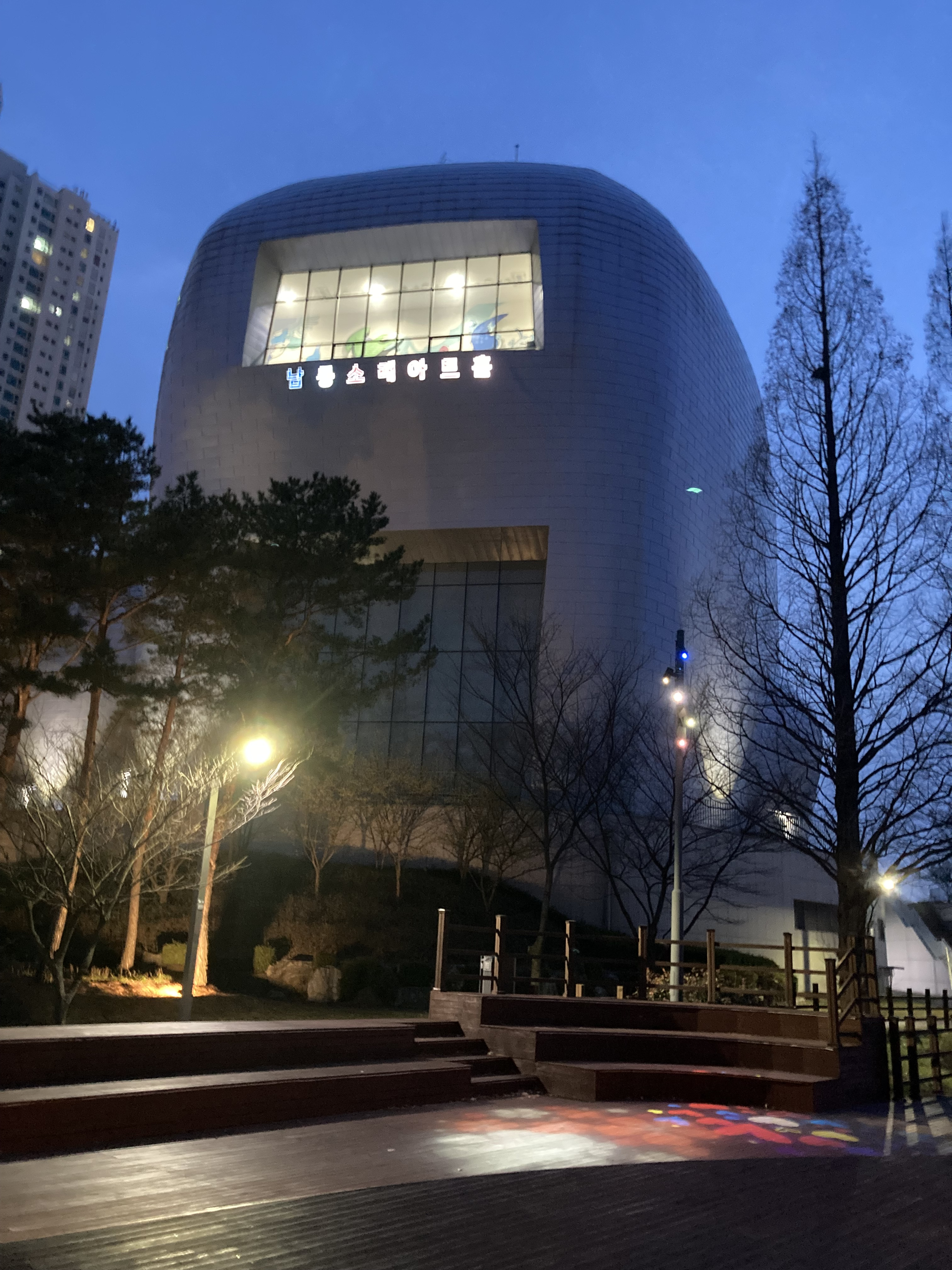
Sorae Art Center & Halls

== Notable people ==
- Park Chan-dae, politician
- Lia, singer, member of Itzy
- Lee Je-no, member of NCT and its subunit NCT Dream
- Miyeon, singer, member of I-dle
- Hapkido Grand Master Han Bong-soo
- Hangzoo, Rhythm Power
- Han Ji-sung, Stray Kids
- Koo Hye-sun, actress, singer
- Kim Ryeo-wook, Super Junior
- Byun Yo-han, actor
- Kim Ji-eun, actress
- Kim Hyo-yeon, Girls' Generation
- Choi Min-ho, Shinee
- Kang Ki-young, actor
- Michaela Dietz, voice actress
- Kim Gu-ra, comedian and host
- Kim Nam-il, footballer
- Cho Yong-hyung, footballer
- Shin Ji, Koyote
- Yoon Chae-kyung, April
- Kang Hye-jung, actress
- Kwon Nara, actress
- Ko Kyung-pyo, actor
- Lee Sung-hyun, kickboxer
- Choi Ji-man, baseball player (New York Yankees, Milwaukee Brewers, Tampa Bay Rays)
- Haewon, vocalist, leader of Nmixx
- Hyolyn, Sistar19
- Roh Ji-hoon, singer
- Ryu Hyun-jin, baseball player (Hanwha Eagles, Los Angeles Dodgers, Toronto Blue Jays)
- Park Cho-a, soloist and former member of AOA
- Bang Min-ah, Girl's Day
- Nam Ji-hyun, actress
- Kyung Soo-jin, actress
- Kim Young-kwang
- JinJoo Lee, DNCE
- Mina Sue Choi, Miss Earth 2022
- Ong Seong-wu, former member of Wanna One, actor and soloist
- Yoo Seung-ho, actor
- Lee Kang-in, footballer
- Kim Sung-joo, singer, actor, UNIQ
- Sung Dong-il, actor
- Sohee, singer and member of Alice
- Park Nam-choon, member of the National Assembly and mayor of Incheon
- Doyeon, singer, actress and member of Weki Meki and WJMK
- Young Kim, U.S. representative for California
- Hong Soo-hyun, actress
- Peggy Gou, DJ
- Kim Won-pil, singer-songwriter, keyboardist and member of Day6
- Do Han-se, rapper and member of Victon
- Kang Ye-seo, k pop singer and former member S Korean girl band group of Maiden
- San E, rapper, songwriter
- Chung Hyun, sculptor
- Song Mingi — rapper, songwriter and member of ATEEZ.

== International relations ==
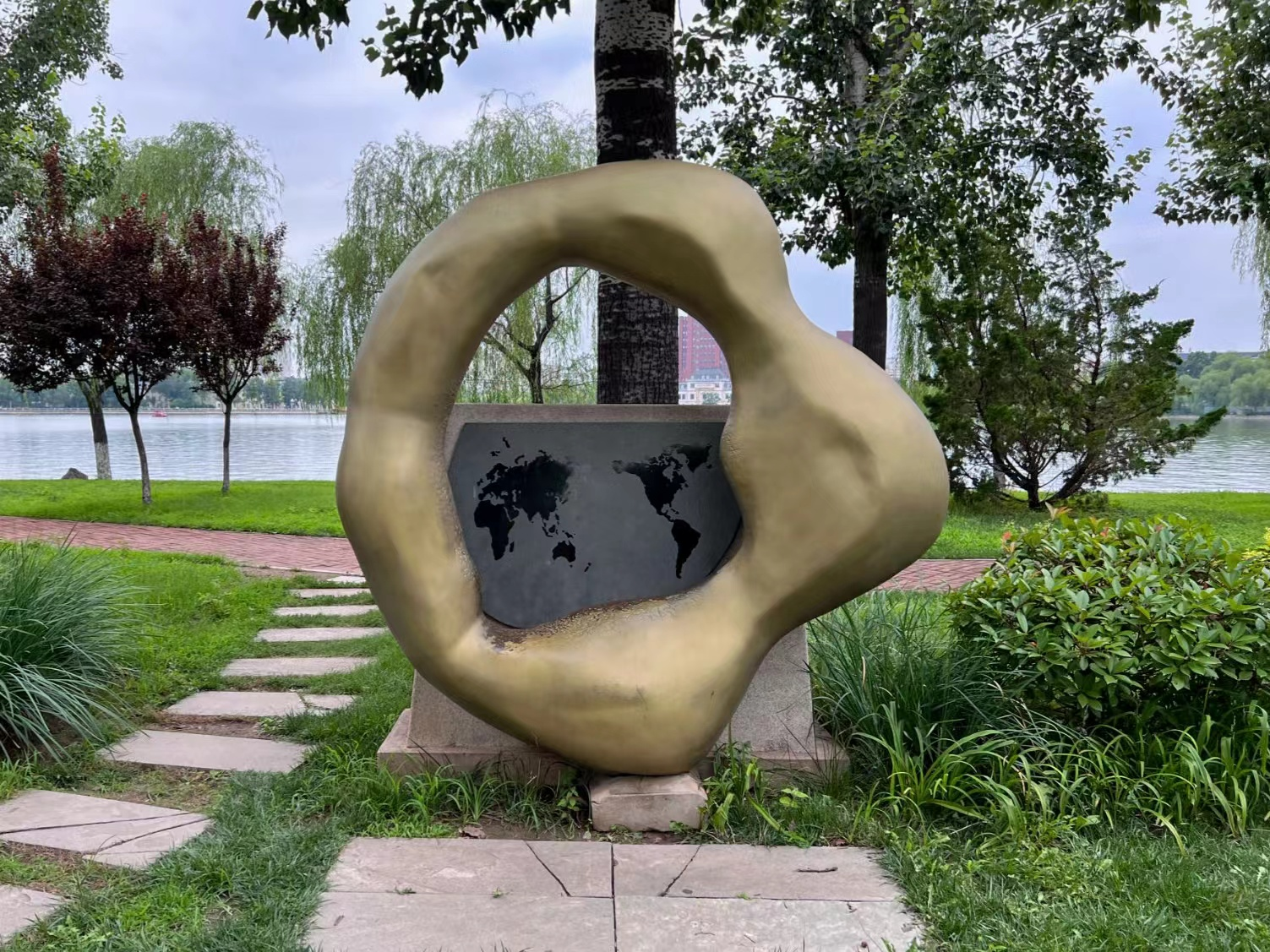
Tianjin and Incheon Friendship City Memorial Sculpture in Tianjin Water Park

Incheon is twinned with:

- Alexandria, Egypt (2000)
- Anchorage, United States (1986)
- Banten, Indonesia (2009)
- Burbank, United States (1961)
- Chongqing, China (2007)
- Gödöllő, Hungary (2023)
- Haiphong, Vietnam (1997)
- Honolulu, United States (2003)
- Kitakyushu, Japan (1988)
- Kobe, Japan (2010)
- Kolkata, India (2007)
- Manila, Philippines (2008)
- Mérida, Mexico (2007)
- Panama City, Panama (2000)
- Philadelphia, United States (1983)
- Phnom Penh, Cambodia (2009)
- Seattle, United States
- Shenyang, China (2014)
- Taoyuan, Taiwan (2009)
- Tel Aviv, Israel (2000)
- Tianjin, China (1993）
- Tlaxcala (city), Mexico (2007)
- Ulaanbaatar, Mongolia (2017)
- Veneto, Italy (2010)
- Vladivostok, Russia (2012)
- Yekaterinburg, Russia (2009)

== See also ==
- List of cities in South Korea
- List of ports and harbors of the Pacific Ocean
- Battle of Chemulpo Bay
- Inchon
- Incheon Chinatown
