= Ara station =

Metro station in Incheon, South Korea

I109 아라 (북부법원·검찰청) Ara (Northern District Court·Prosecutors' Office)
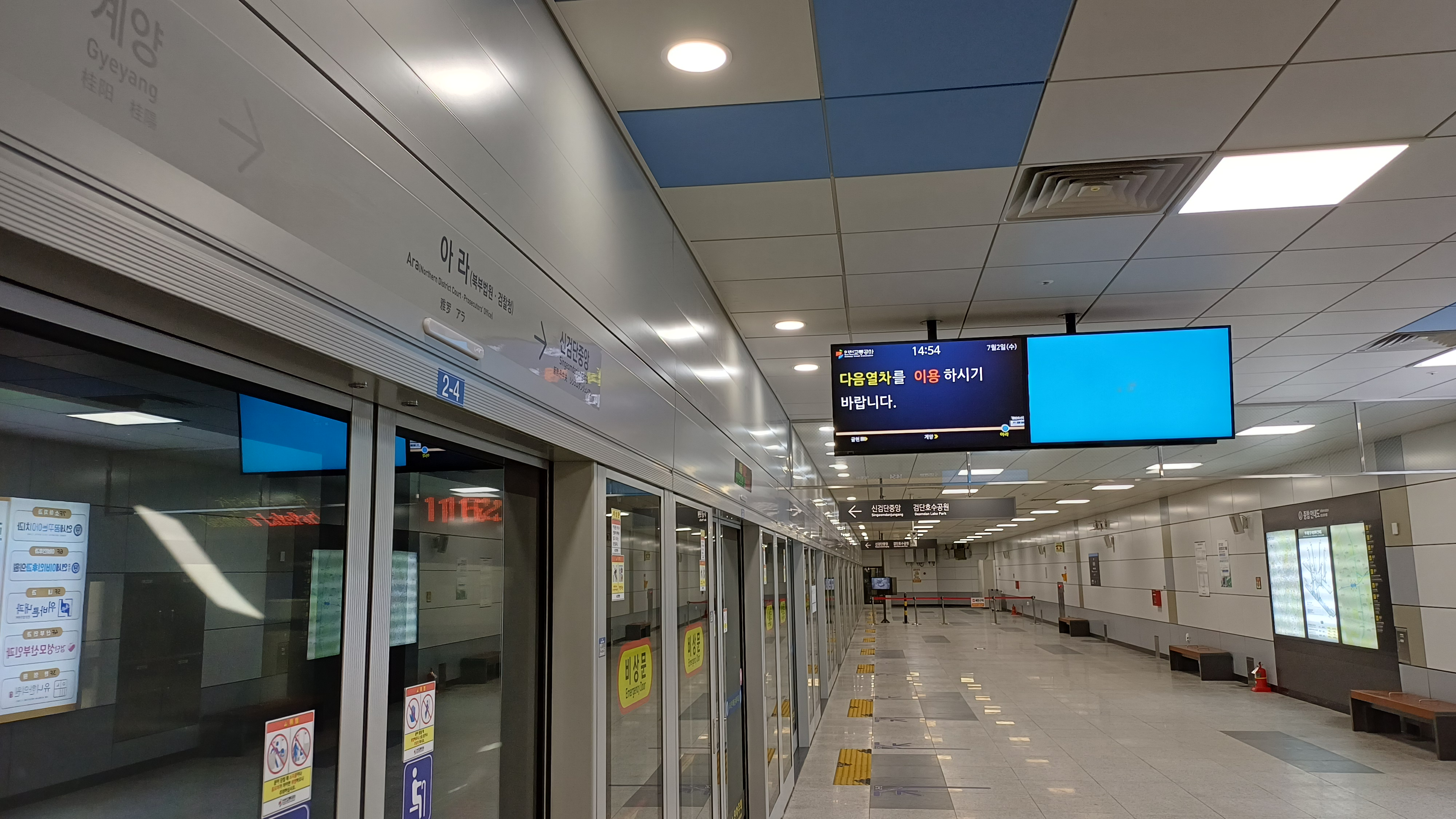
- Station platform

Korean name
- Hangul: 아라역
- Hanja: 아라驛
- Revised Romanization: Ara-yeok
- McCune–Reischauer: Ara-yŏk

General information
- Location: 1238 Dangha-dong, Geomdan District, Incheon
- Operator: Incheon Transit Corporation
- Line: Incheon Line 1
- Platforms: 2
- Tracks: 2

Construction
- Structure type: Underground

History
- Opened: June 28, 2025; 15 months ago

Services
Preceding station	Incheon Subway	Following station
Singeomdanjungang towards Geomdan Lake Park	Incheon Line 1	Gyeyang towards Songdo Moonlight Festival Park
Location

Ara station (Korean: 아라역) is a Line 1 subway station of the Incheon Subway in Geomdan District, Incheon, South Korea. It opened on June 28, 2025.

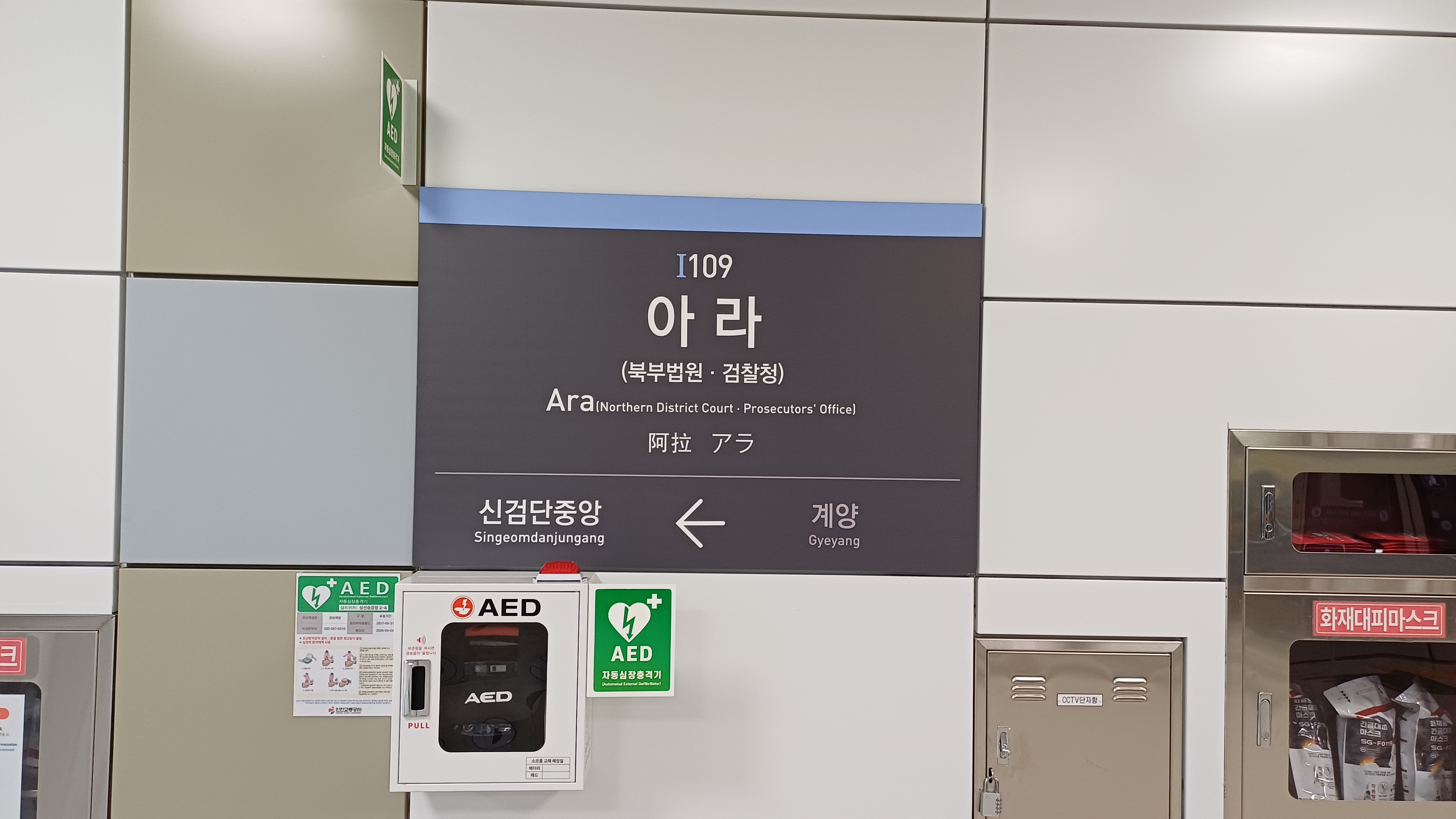
Station nameplate
