= Technopark station =

Metro station in Incheon, South Korea

I134 테크노파크 (현대프리미엄아울렛 송도점) Technopark (Hyundai Premium Outlet Songdo Branch)
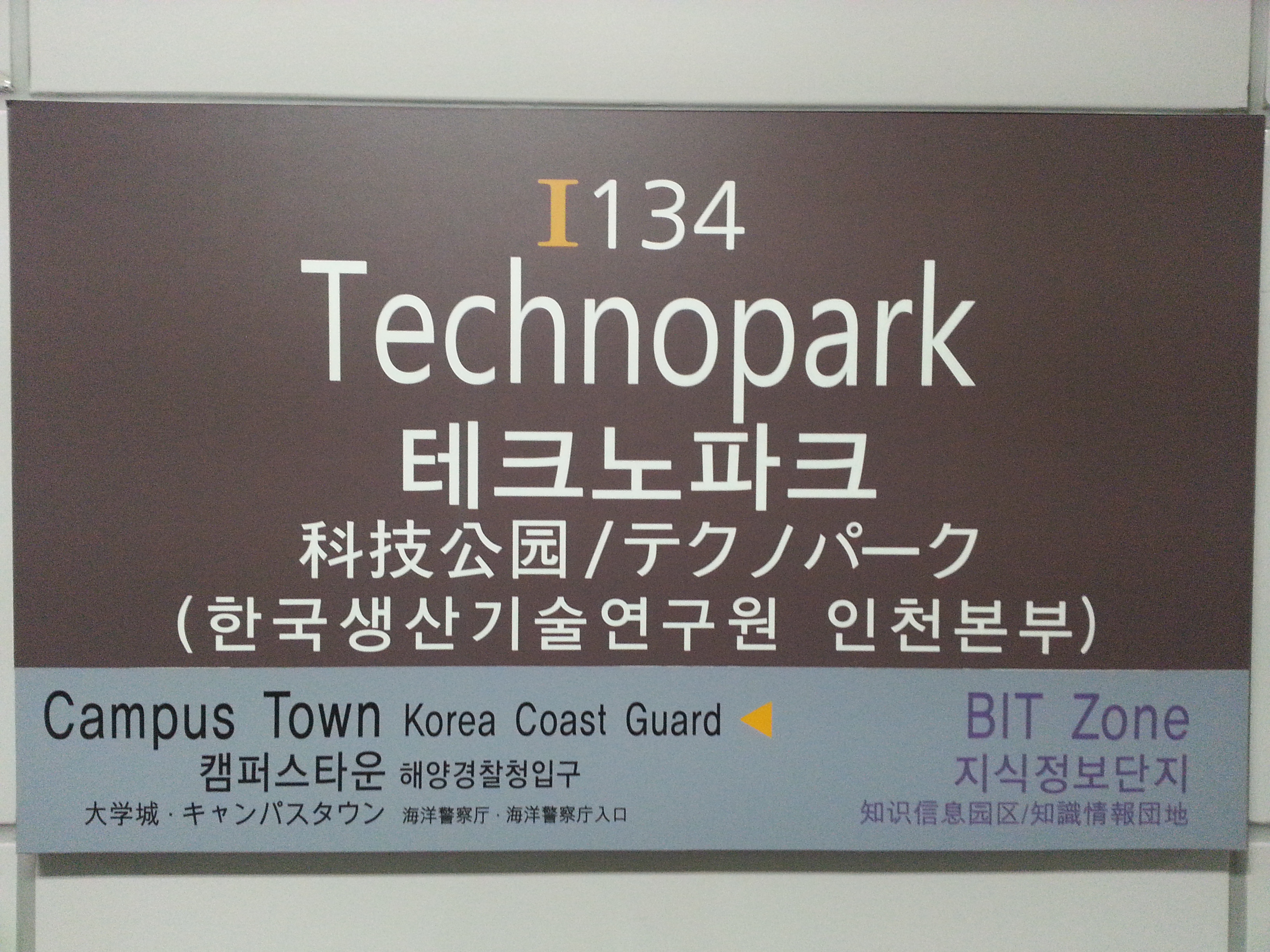

Korean name
- Hangul: 테크노파크역
- Hanja: 테크노파크驛
- Revised Romanization: Tekeunopakeu-yeok
- McCune–Reischauer: T'ek'ŭnop'ak'ŭ-yŏk

General information
- Location: 7-51 Songdo-dong, Jiha150, Songdogukje-daero, Yeonsu-gu, Incheon
- Coordinates: 37°22′56″N 126°39′23″E
- Operator: Incheon Transit Corporation
- Line: Incheon Line 1
- Platforms: 2
- Tracks: 2

Construction
- Structure type: Underground

Other information
- Station code: I134

History
- Opened: June 1, 2009

Passengers
- 2017: 13,135

Services
Preceding station	Incheon Subway	Following station
Campus Town towards Geomdan Lake Park	Incheon Line 1	BIT Zone towards Songdo Moonlight Festival Park
Location

Technopark Station (Korean: 테크노파크역; Hanja: 테크노파크驛) is a subway station on Line 1 of the Incheon Subway in Jiha150, Songdogukje-daero, Yeonsu District, Incheon, South Korea.

== Station layout ==
G	Street Level
L1	Concourse	Faregates, Ticketing Machines, Station Control
L2; Platforms	Side platform, doors will open on the right
L2; Platforms	Westbound	← Incheon Line 1 toward Geomdan Lake Park (Woninjae)
L2; Platforms	Eastbound	→ Incheon Line 1 toward Songdo Moonlight Festival Park (BIT Zone) →
L2; Platforms	Side platform, doors will open on the right
