= Singeomdanjungang station =

Metro station in Incheon, South Korea

I108 신검단중앙 Singeomdanjungang
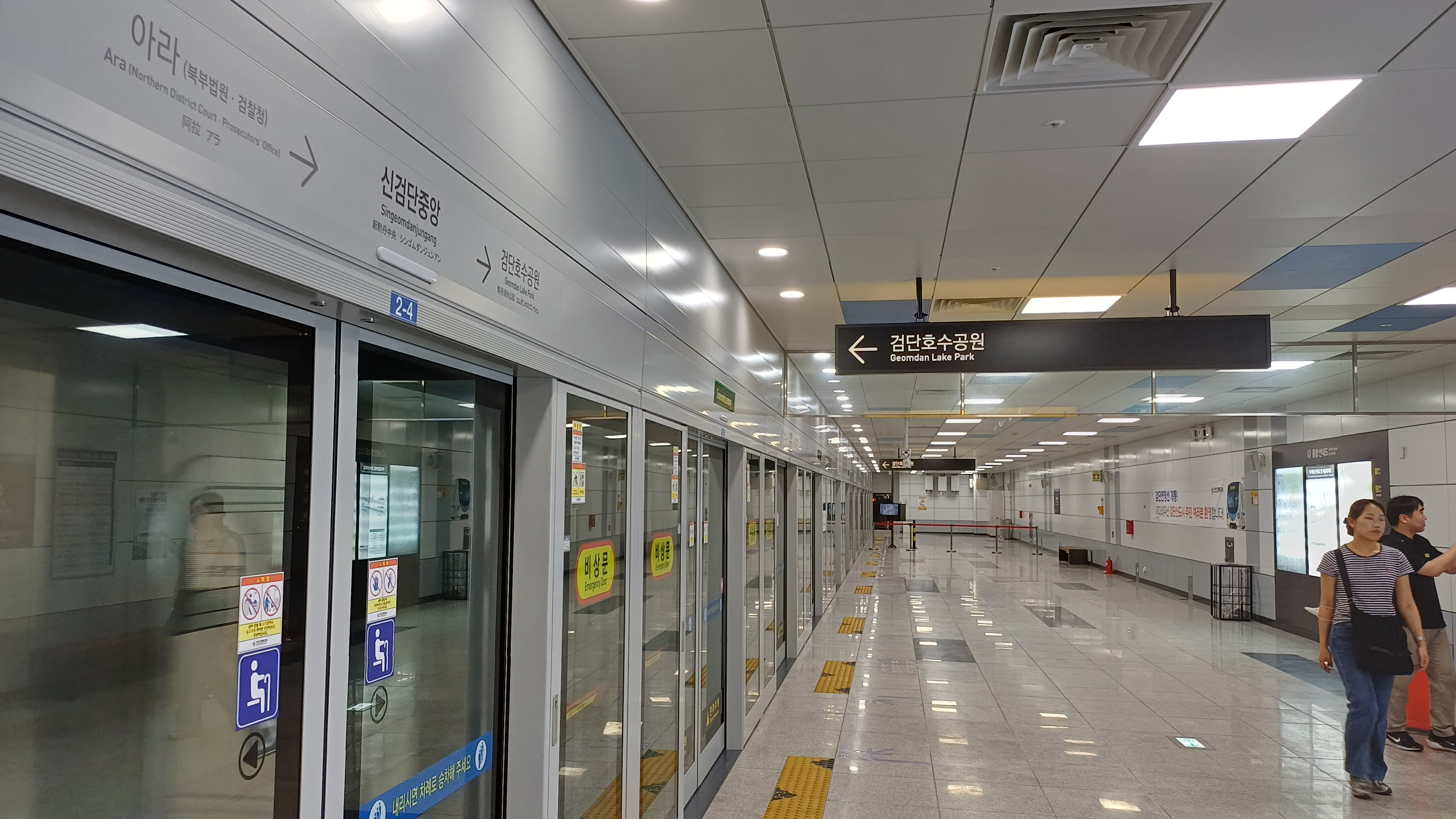
- Station platform

Korean name
- Hangul: 신검단중앙역
- Hanja: 新黔丹中央驛
- RR: Singeomdan jungang-yeok
- MR: Sin'gŏmdan chungang-yŏk

General information
- Location: 651-1 Wondang-dong, Geomdan District, Incheon
- Operator: Incheon Transit Corporation
- Line: Incheon Line 1
- Platforms: 2
- Tracks: 2

Construction
- Structure type: Underground

History
- Opened: June 28, 2025; 14 months ago

Services
Preceding station	Incheon Subway	Following station
Geomdan Lake Park Terminus	Incheon Line 1	Ara towards Songdo Moonlight Festival Park
Location

Singeomdanjungang station (Korean: 신검단중앙역) is a Line 1 subway station of the Incheon Subway in Geomdan District, Incheon, South Korea. It opened on June 28, 2025.

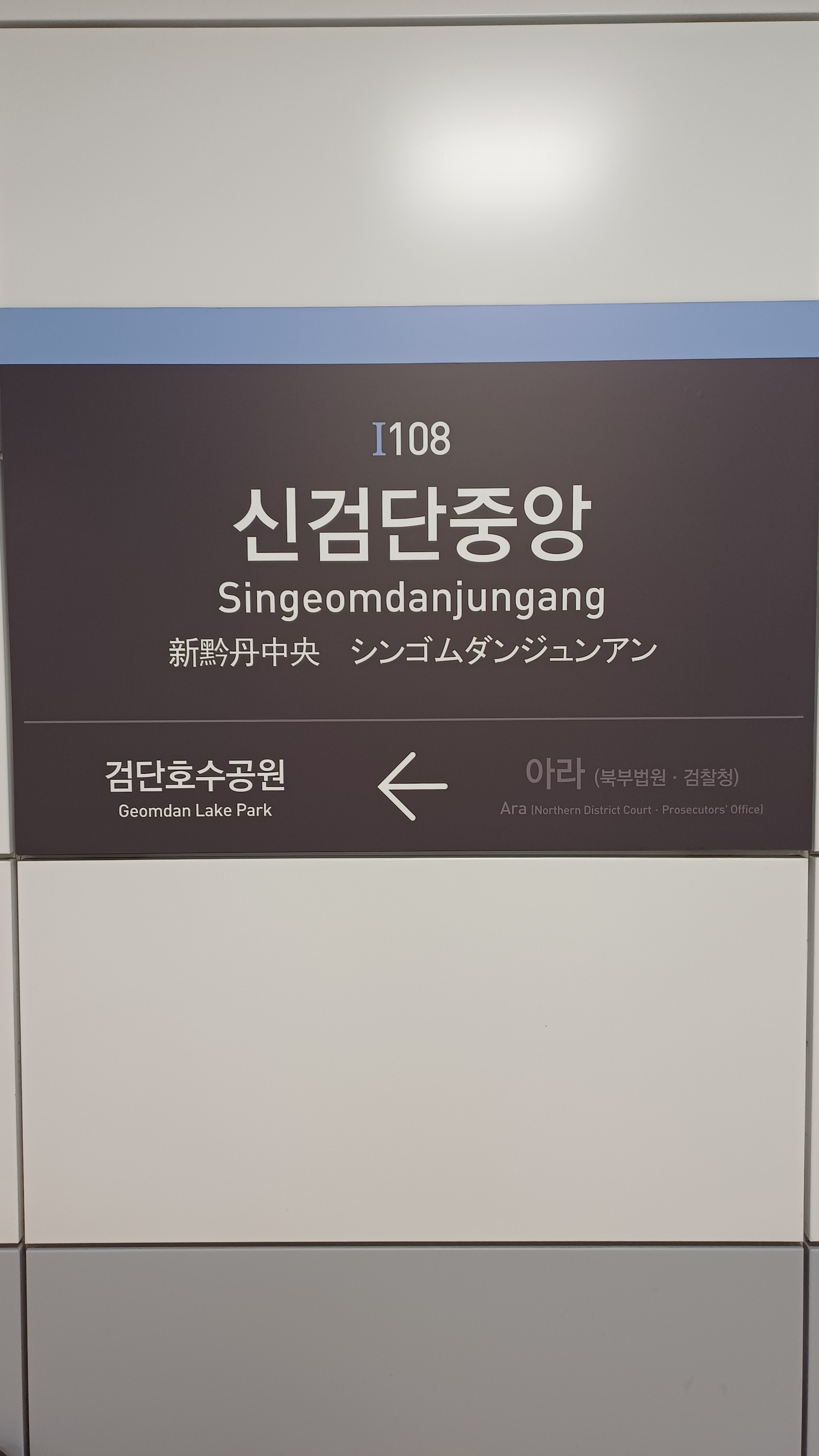
Station nameplate
