= BIT Zone station =

Metro station in Incheon, South Korea

Coordinates: 37.37827°N 126.64519°E

I135 지식정보단지 BIT Zone
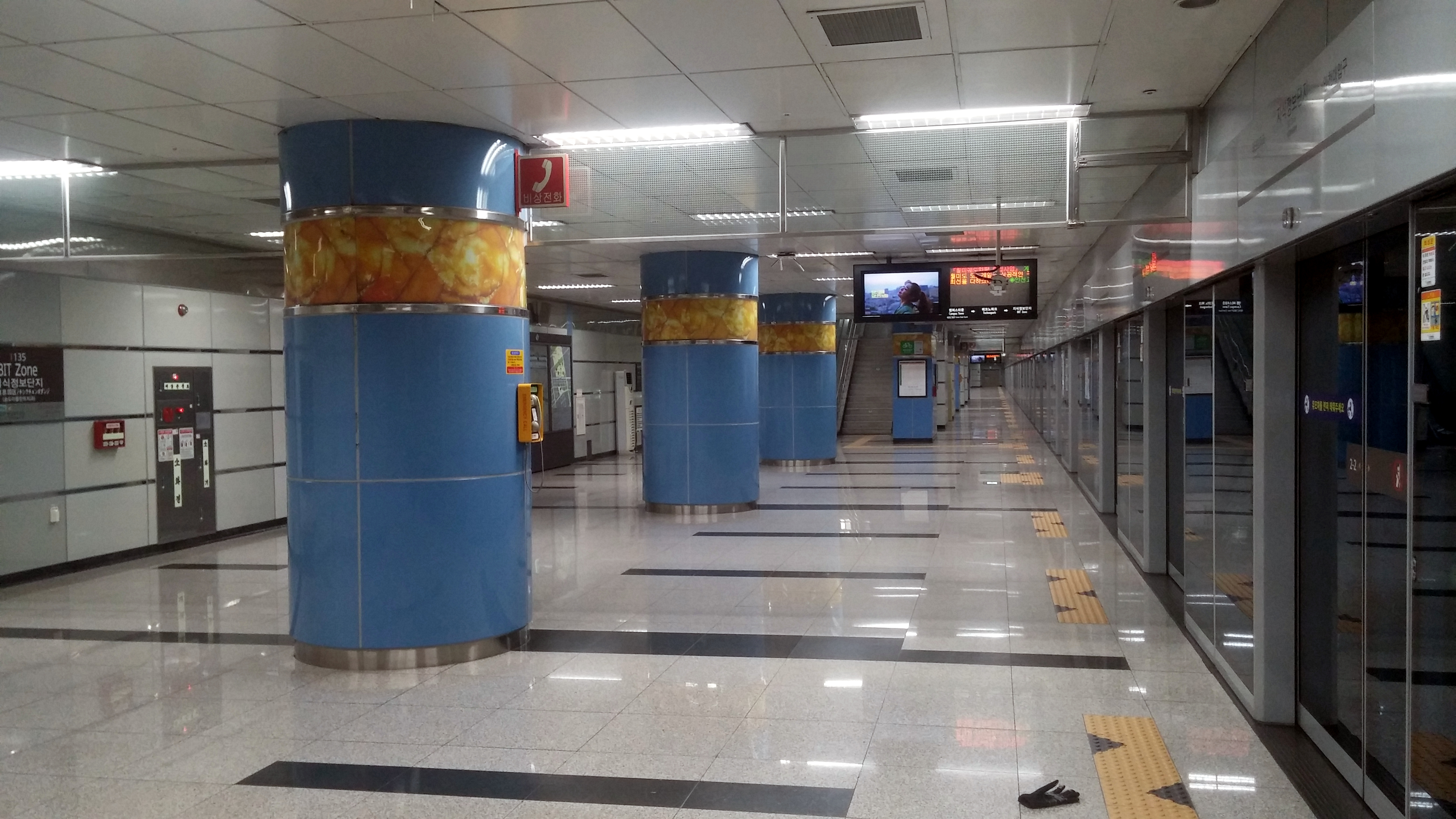
- Station platform

Korean name
- Hangul: 지식정보단지역
- Hanja: 知識情報團地驛
- Revised Romanization: Jisik jeongbo danji-yeok
- McCune–Reischauer: Chisik chŏngbo tanji-yŏk

General information
- Location: 7-51 Songdo-dong, Yeonsu-gu, Incheon
- Operator: Incheon Transit Corporation
- Line: Incheon Line 1
- Platforms: 2
- Tracks: 2

Construction
- Structure type: Underground

Other information
- Station code: I135

History
- Opened: June 1, 2009

Passengers
- 2017: 7,857

Services
Preceding station	Incheon Subway	Following station
Technopark towards Geomdan Lake Park	Incheon Line 1	Incheon National University towards Songdo Moonlight Festival Park
Location

BIT Zone Station (Korean: 지식정보단지) is a subway station on Line 1 of the Incheon Subway in Yeonsu District, Incheon, South Korea. The station has three entrances, a small community stage, and a large sky-lit atrium inside the fare area.

The name "Bio-Information Technology Zone" refers to Songdo planners' efforts to promote scientific entrepreneurship in the area. The station is one of few in the Seoul metro system to have a different English name from the Korean one.

== Station layout ==
G	Street Level	Exits
L1	Concourse	Faregates, Ticketing Machines, Station Control
L2; Platforms	Side platform, doors will open on the right
L2; Platforms	Westbound	← Incheon Line 1 toward Geomdan Lake Park (Technopark)
L2; Platforms	Eastbound	→ Incheon Line 1 toward Songdo Moonlight Festival Park (Incheon Nat'l Univ.) →
L2; Platforms	Side platform, doors will open on the right

== Gallery ==
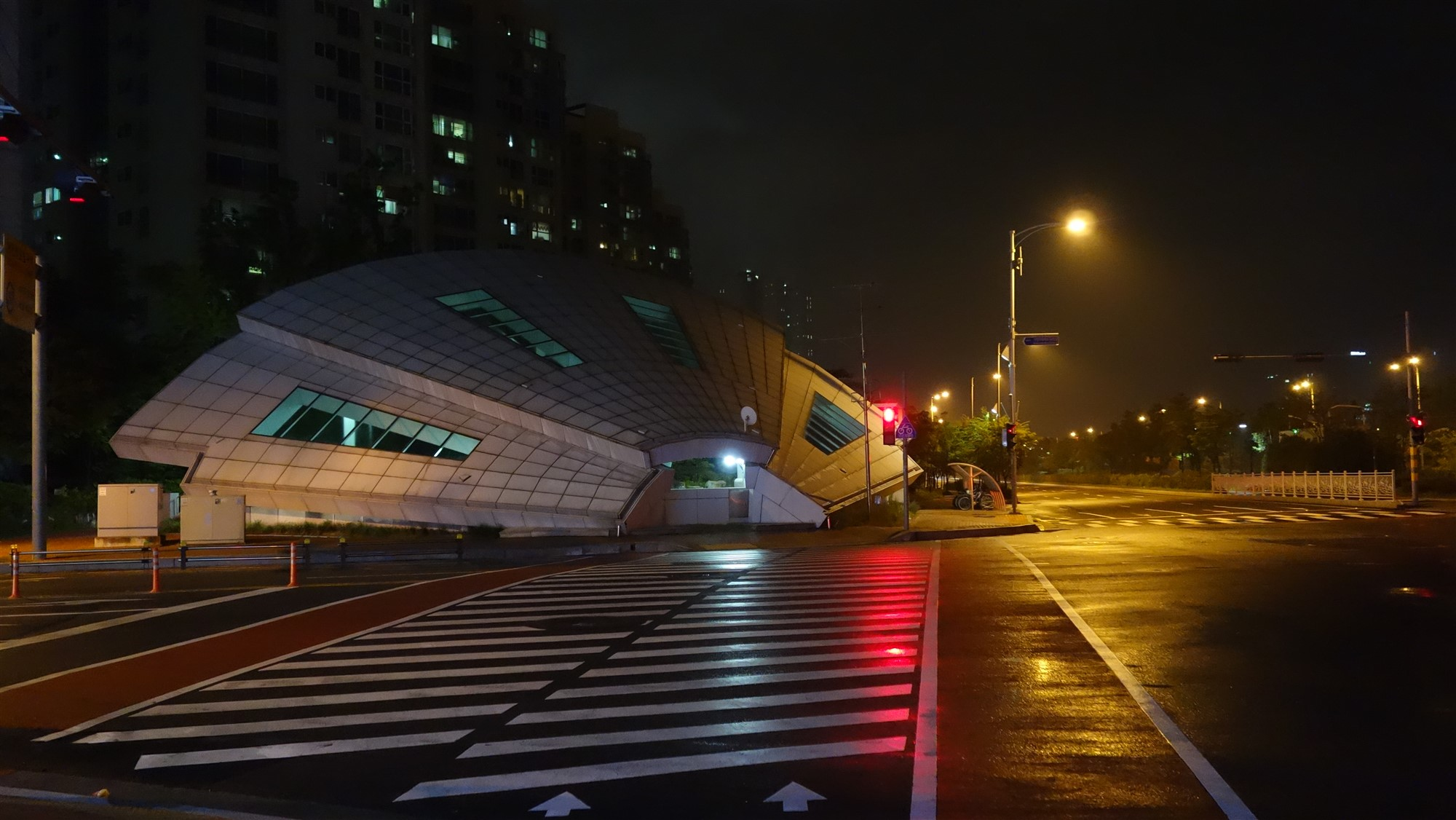
BIT Zone Station at night

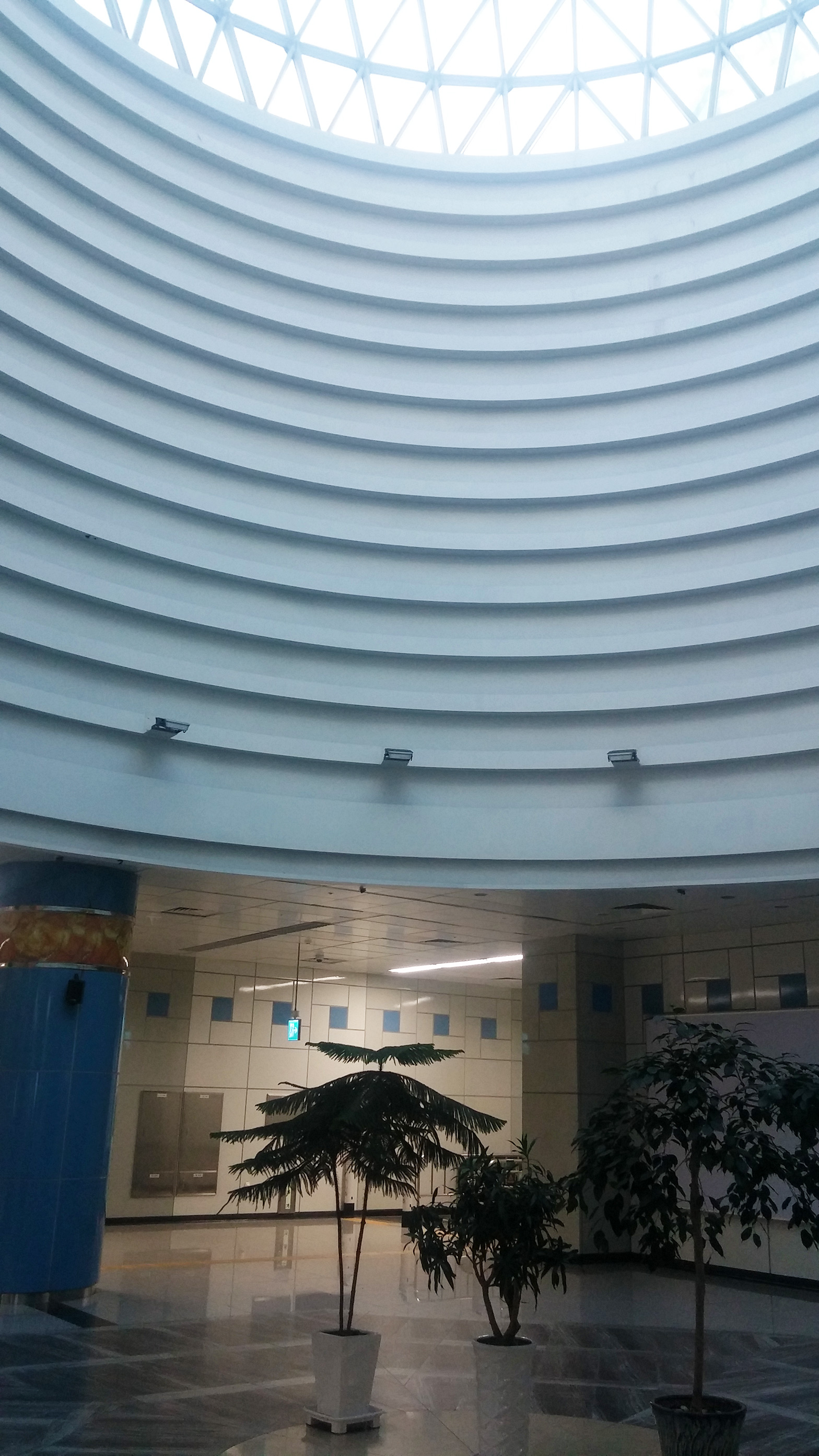
Skylight atrium in BIT Zone Station

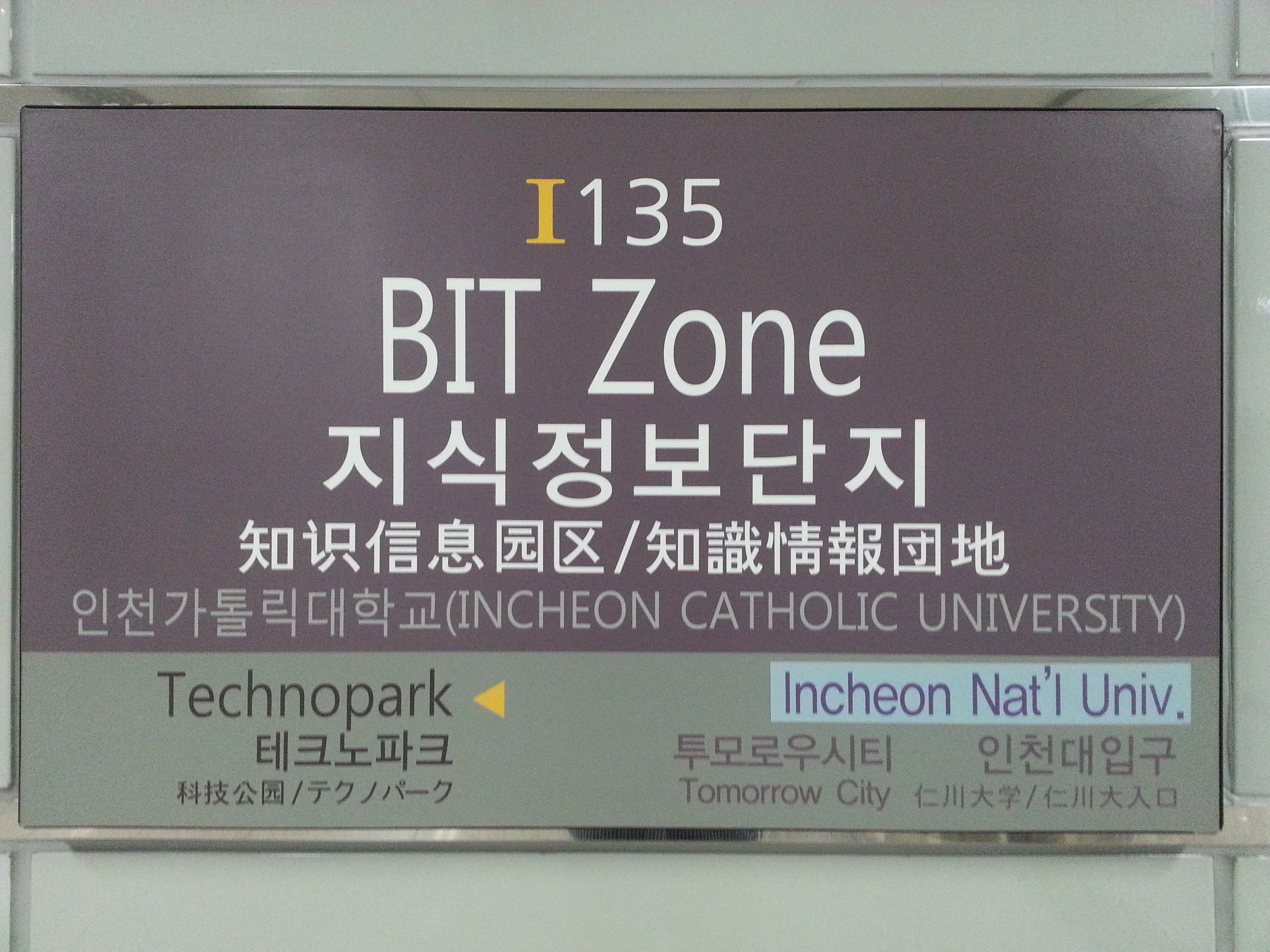
Station Name Board
