= Campus Town station =

Metro station in Incheon, South Korea

I133 캠퍼스타운 (연세대학교) Campus Town (Yonsei University)
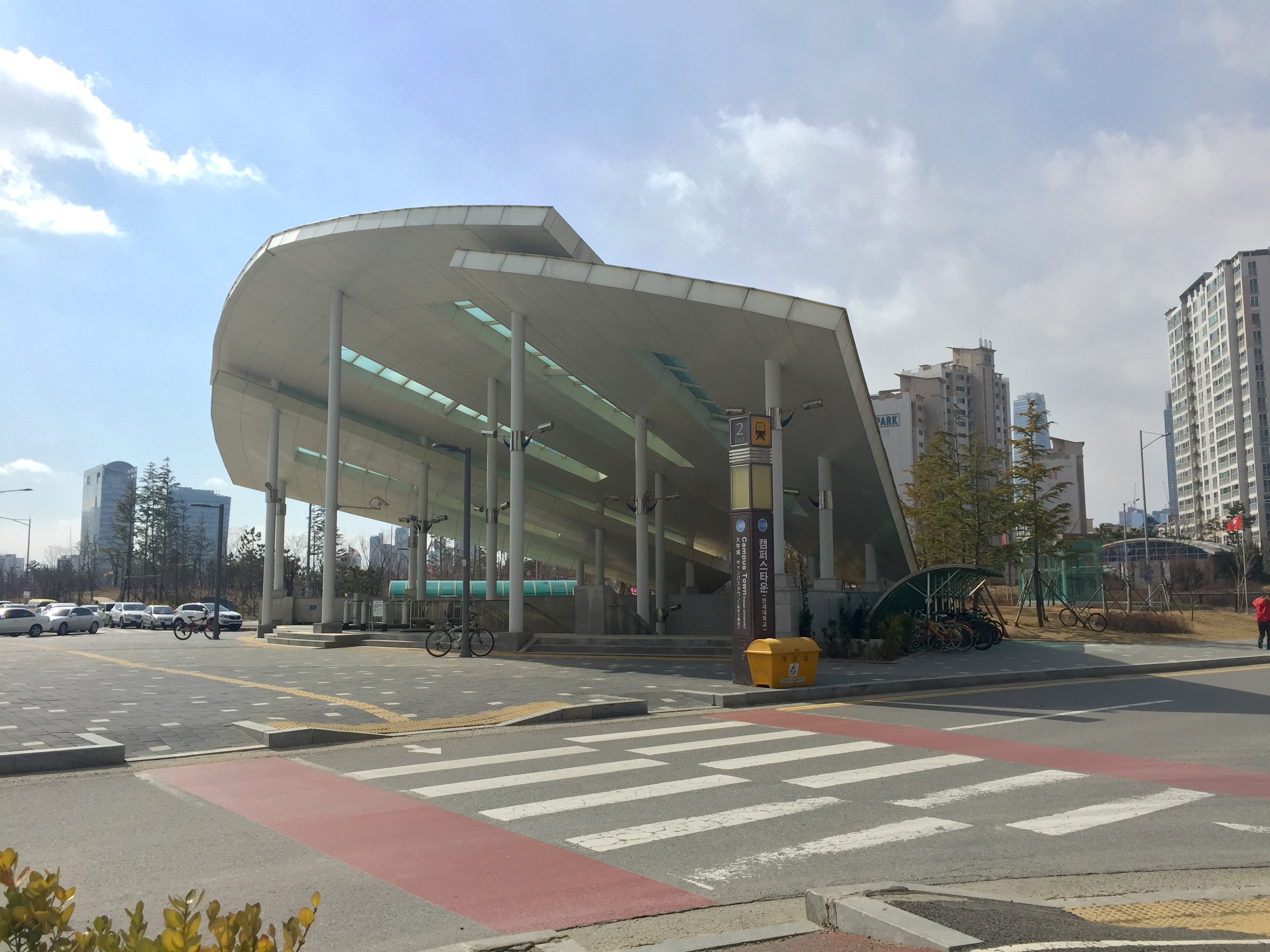
- Campus Town station entrance No. 2

Korean name
- Hangul: 캠퍼스타운역
- Hanja: 캠퍼스타운驛
- Revised Romanization: Kaempeoseutaunnyeok
- McCune–Reischauer: K'aemp'ŏsŭt'aunnyŏk

General information
- Other names: Yonsei University
- Location: 3-47 Songdo-dong, Jiha66, Songdogukje-daero, Yeonsu-gu, Incheon
- Coordinates: 37°23′16″N 126°39′42″E
- Operator: Incheon Transit Corporation
- Line: Incheon Line 1
- Platforms: 2
- Tracks: 2

Construction
- Structure type: Underground

Other information
- Station code: I133

History
- Opened: June 1, 2009

Passengers
- 2017: 11,261

Services
Preceding station	Incheon Subway	Following station
Dongmak towards Geomdan Lake Park	Incheon Line 1	Technopark towards Songdo Moonlight Festival Park
Location

Campus Town Station (Korean: 캠퍼스타운역; Hanja: 캠퍼스타운驛) is a subway station on Line 1 of the Incheon Subway in Yeonsu District, Incheon, South Korea. Its other name is Yonsei University.

== History ==
The station was opened on June 1, 2009. On September 3, 2013, by the 13th announced of the National Police Agency, the station name changed to Campus Town (Entrance of the National Maritime Police Agency) Station. On November 19, 2014, it was rename back to Campus Town Station.

== Station layout ==
G	Street Level	Exits
L1	Concourse	Faregates, Ticketing Machines, Station Control
L2; Platforms	Side platform, doors will open on the right
L2; Platforms	Westbound	← Incheon Line 1 toward Geomdan Lake Park (Dongmak)
L2; Platforms	Eastbound	→ Incheon Line 1 toward Songdo Moonlight Festival Park (Technopark) →
L2; Platforms	Side platform, doors will open on the right
