= Central Park station (Incheon) =

Metro station in Incheon, South Korea

I137 센트럴파크 (재외동포청) Central Park (Overseas Koreans Agency)
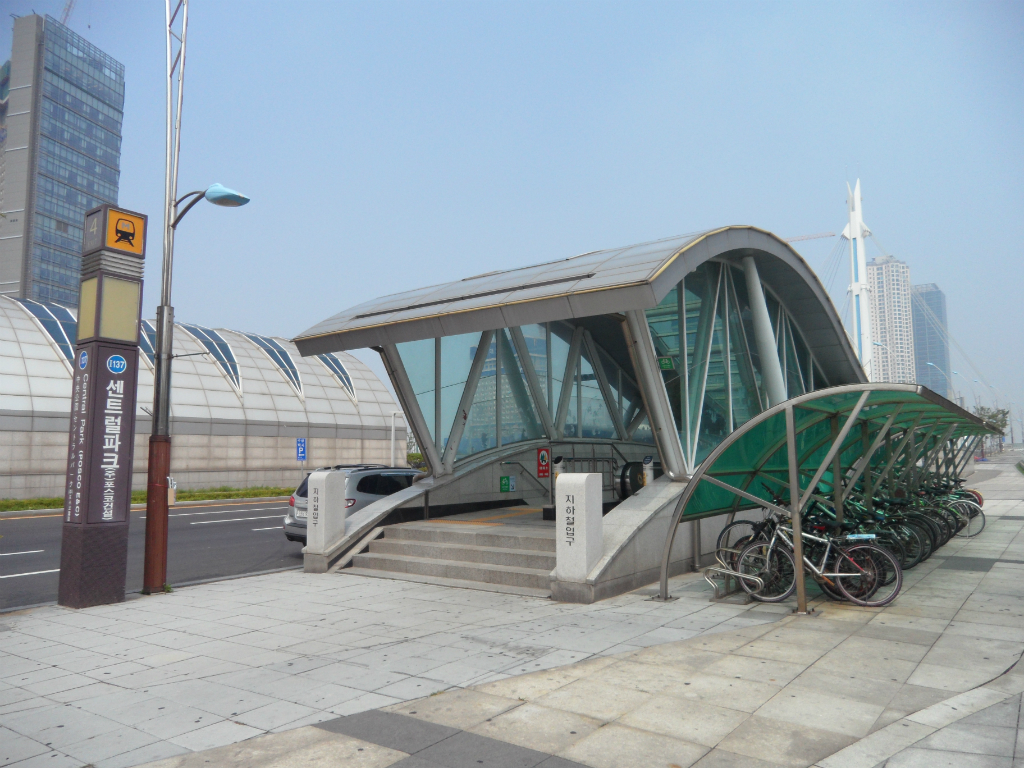
- Central Park Station Exit No. 4

Korean name
- Hangul: 센트럴파크역
- Hanja: 中央公園
- Revised Romanization: Senteureolpakeu-yeok
- McCune–Reischauer: Sent'ŭrŏlp'ak'ŭ-yŏk

General information
- Location: 78 Songdo-dong, Jiha240, Incheon-tower-daero, Yeonsu-gu, Incheon
- Coordinates: 37°23′35″N 126°38′05″E
- Operator: Incheon Transit Corporation
- Line: Incheon Line 1
- Platforms: 2
- Tracks: 2

Construction
- Structure type: Underground

Other information
- Station code: I137

History
- Opened: June 1, 2009

Passengers
- 2017: 6,338

Services
Preceding station	Incheon Subway	Following station
Incheon National University towards Geomdan Lake Park	Incheon Line 1	International Business District towards Songdo Moonlight Festival Park
Location

Central Park Station (Korean: 센트럴파크; Hanja: 中央公園) is a subway station on Line 1 of the Incheon Subway in Jiha240, Incheon-tower-daero, Yeonsu District, Incheon, South Korea.

Its Hanja name is pronounced differently from his Hangul.

== Station layout ==
G	Street Level	Exits
L1	Concourse	Faregates, Ticketing Machines, Station Control
L2; Platforms	Side platform, doors will open on the right
L2; Platforms	Westbound	← Incheon Line 1 toward Geomdan Lake Park (Incheon National University)
L2; Platforms	Eastbound	→ Incheon Line 1 toward Songdo Moonlight Festival Park (Int'l Business District) →
L2; Platforms	Side platform, doors will open on the right

== Neighborhood ==
- Songdo Central Park
- POSCO E&C Tower
- Incheon City History Museum
- Incheon Bridge Observation Deck
- Incheon Art Center
