= Bupyeong Market station =

Metro station in Incheon, South Korea

I119 부평시장 (한길안과병원) Bupyeong Market (Hangil Eye Hospital)
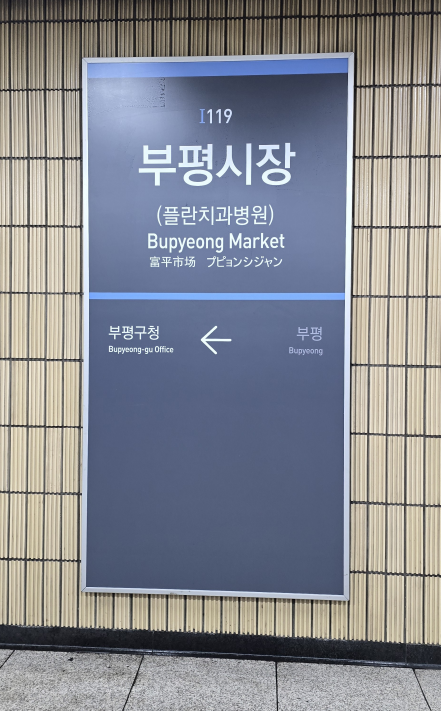
- Station Sign (platform)

Korean name
- Hangul: 부평시장역
- Hanja: 富平市場驛
- Revised Romanization: Bupyeong-sijang-yeok
- McCune–Reischauer: Pup'yŏng-sijang-yŏk

General information
- Location: 224-1 Bupyeong 1-dong, Jiha69, Bupyeongdaero, Bupyeong-gu, Incheon
- Coordinates: 37°29′54″N 126°43′20″E
- Operator: Incheon Transit Corporation
- Line: Incheon Line 1
- Platforms: 2
- Tracks: 2

Construction
- Structure type: Underground
- Cycle facilities: Yes

History
- Opened: October 6, 1999; 27 years ago

Passengers
- 2017: 24,555

Services
Preceding station	Incheon Subway	Following station
Bupyeong-gu Office towards Geomdan Lake Park	Incheon Line 1	Bupyeong towards Songdo Moonlight Festival Park
Location

Bupyeong Market Station (Korean: 부평시장역; Hanja: 富平市場驛) is a subway station on Line 1 of the Incheon Subway in Bupyeong District, Incheon, South Korea.

== Station layout ==
G	Street Level
L1	Concourse	Faregates, Ticketing Machines, Station Control
L2; Platforms	Side platform, doors will open on the right
L2; Platforms	Westbound	← Incheon Line 1 toward Geomdan Lake Park (Bupyeong-gu Office)
L2; Platforms	Eastbound	→ Incheon Line 1 toward Songdo Moonlight Festival Park (Bupyeong) →
L2; Platforms	Side platform, doors will open on the right

== Exits ==
Exit No.	Image	Destinations
1		Bupyeong post office Bupyeong Dong elementary school Bupyeong middle school Bupyeong high school Buk Incheon Jeongbo Sanup high school
2		Bupyeong market
3		Bukbu education office Bupyeong Seo elementary school
4		Bupyeong girls' high school Bupyeong Joongang Hospital
