= Gyeyang station =

Metro station in Incheon, South Korea

Coordinates: 37°34′17″N 126°44′11″E

I110
계양
Gyeyang
계양; Gyeyang
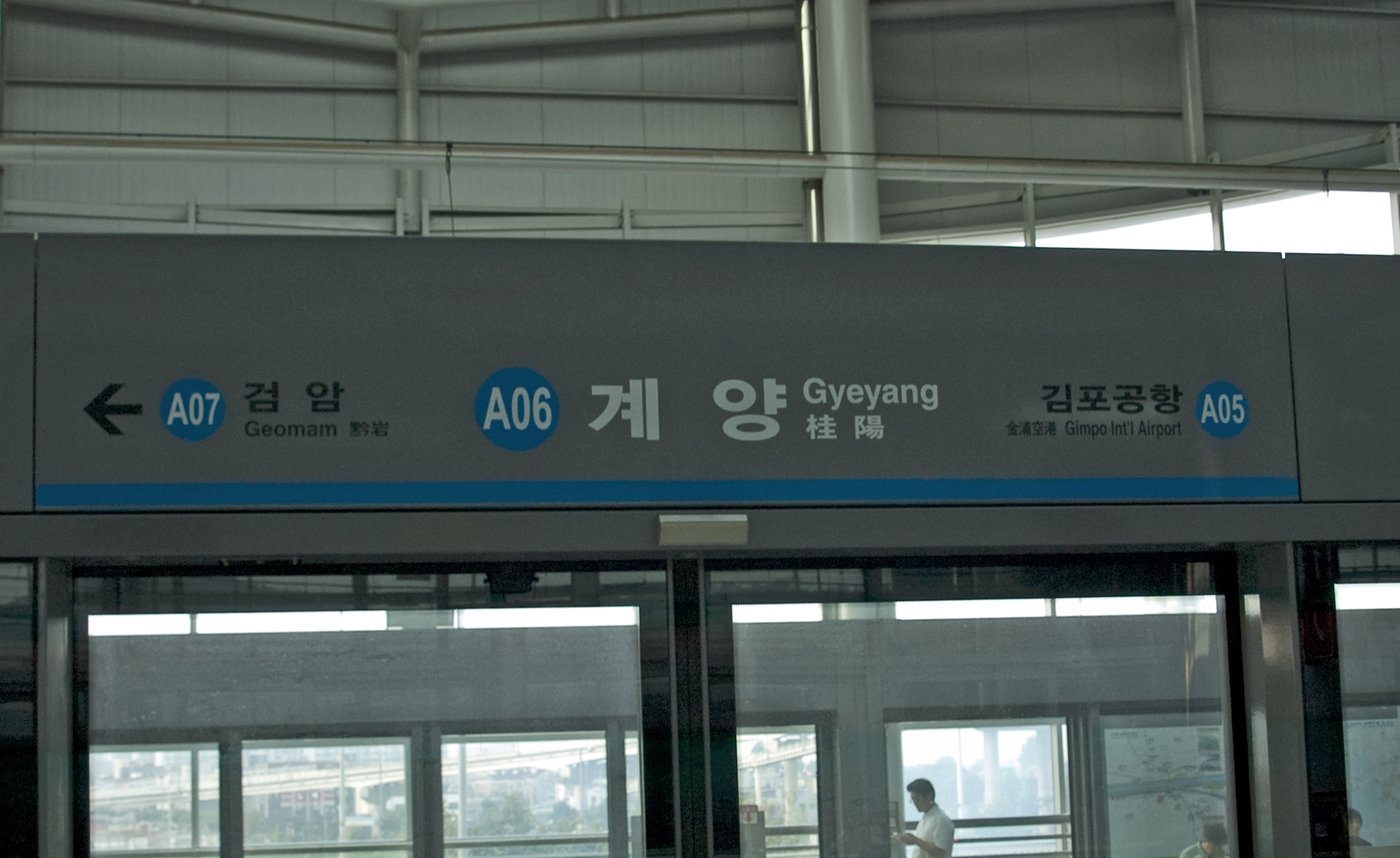
- Gyeyang station

Korean name
- Hangul: 계양역
- Hanja: 桂陽驛
- Revised Romanization: Gyeyang-nyeok
- McCune–Reischauer: Kyeyang-nyŏk

General information
- Location: 451-267 Gyulhyeon-dong, 24 Danamno, Gyeyang-gu, Incheon
- Operator: Airport Railroad Co., Ltd. Incheon Transit Corporation
- Lines: AREX; Incheon Line 1
- Platforms: 4
- Tracks: 4

History
- Opened: March 23, 2007; 19 years ago AREX; March 16, 2007; 19 years ago Incheon Line 1

Services
Preceding station	Seoul Metropolitan Subway	Following station
Gimpo International Airport towards Seoul	AREX Local	Geomam towards Incheon Int'l Airport Terminal 2
Preceding station	Incheon Subway	Following station
Ara towards Geomdan Lake Park	Incheon Line 1	Gyulhyeon towards Songdo Moonlight Festival Park
Location

Gyeyang station is a subway station on Line 1 of the Incheon Subway. It is also a railway station on AREX, a railway linking Seoul Station and Incheon International Airport.

In 2007, station for Incheon subway line opened and then AREX opened on March 23.

== Station layout ==
G	Street Level	Exits
L1	Concourse	Faregates, Ticketing Machines, Station Control
L2; Platforms	Side platform, doors will open on the right
L2; Platforms	Westbound	← Incheon Line 1 toward Geomdan Lake Park (Ara)
L2; Platforms	Eastbound	→ Incheon Line 1 toward Songdo Moonlight Festival Park (Gyulhyeon) →
L2; Platforms	Side platform, doors will open on the right
L3; Platforms	Side platform, doors will open on the left
L3; Platforms	Eastbound	→ AREX toward Incheon International Airport Terminal 2 (Geomam) →
L3; Platforms	Westbound	← AREX toward Seoul (Gimpo International Airport)
L3; Platforms	Side platform, doors will open on the left

== Vicinity ==
- Exit 1 : Gyeyang Elementary & Middle Schools

== Gallery ==
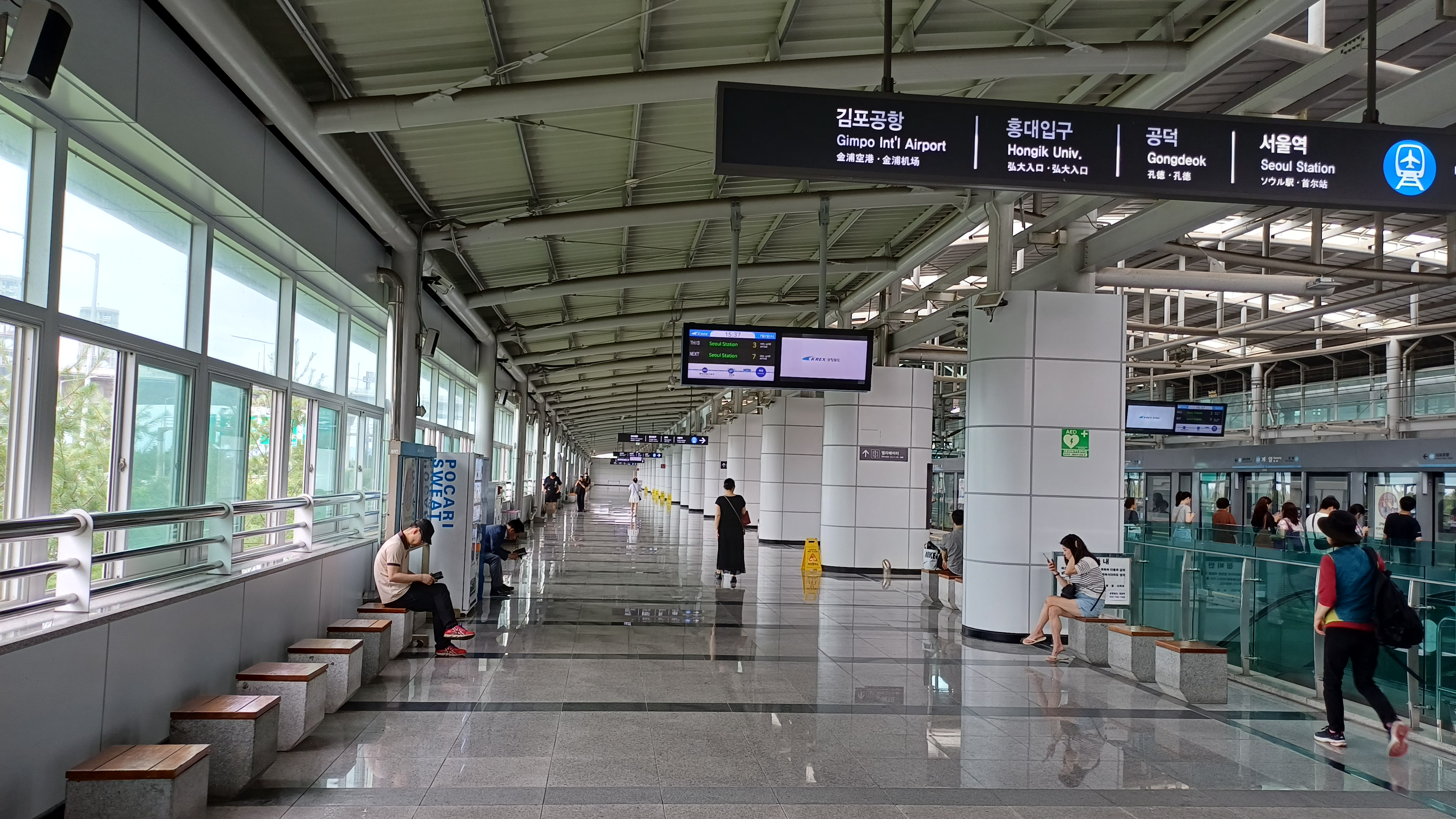
AREX platform

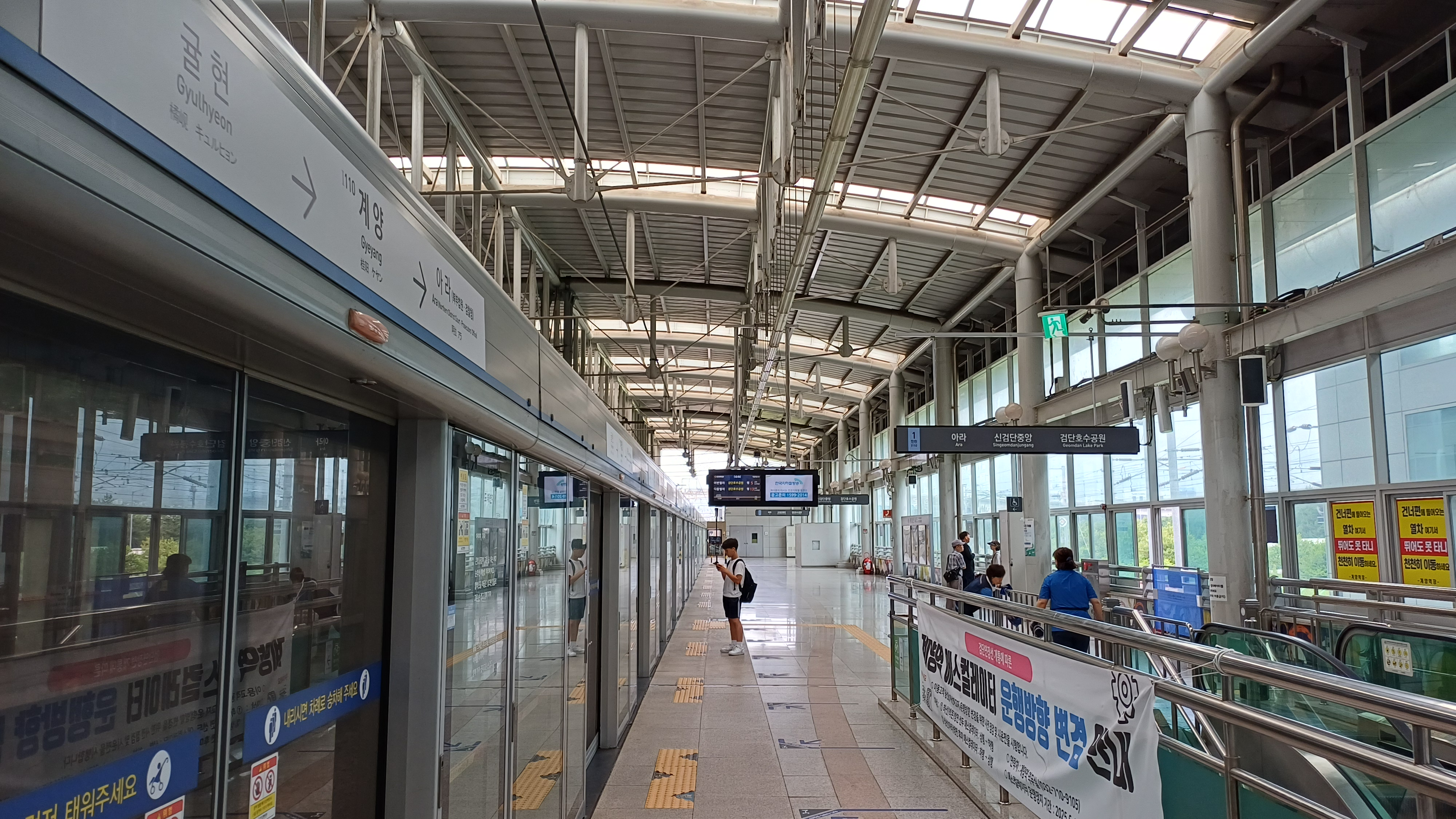
Incheon Line 1 platform

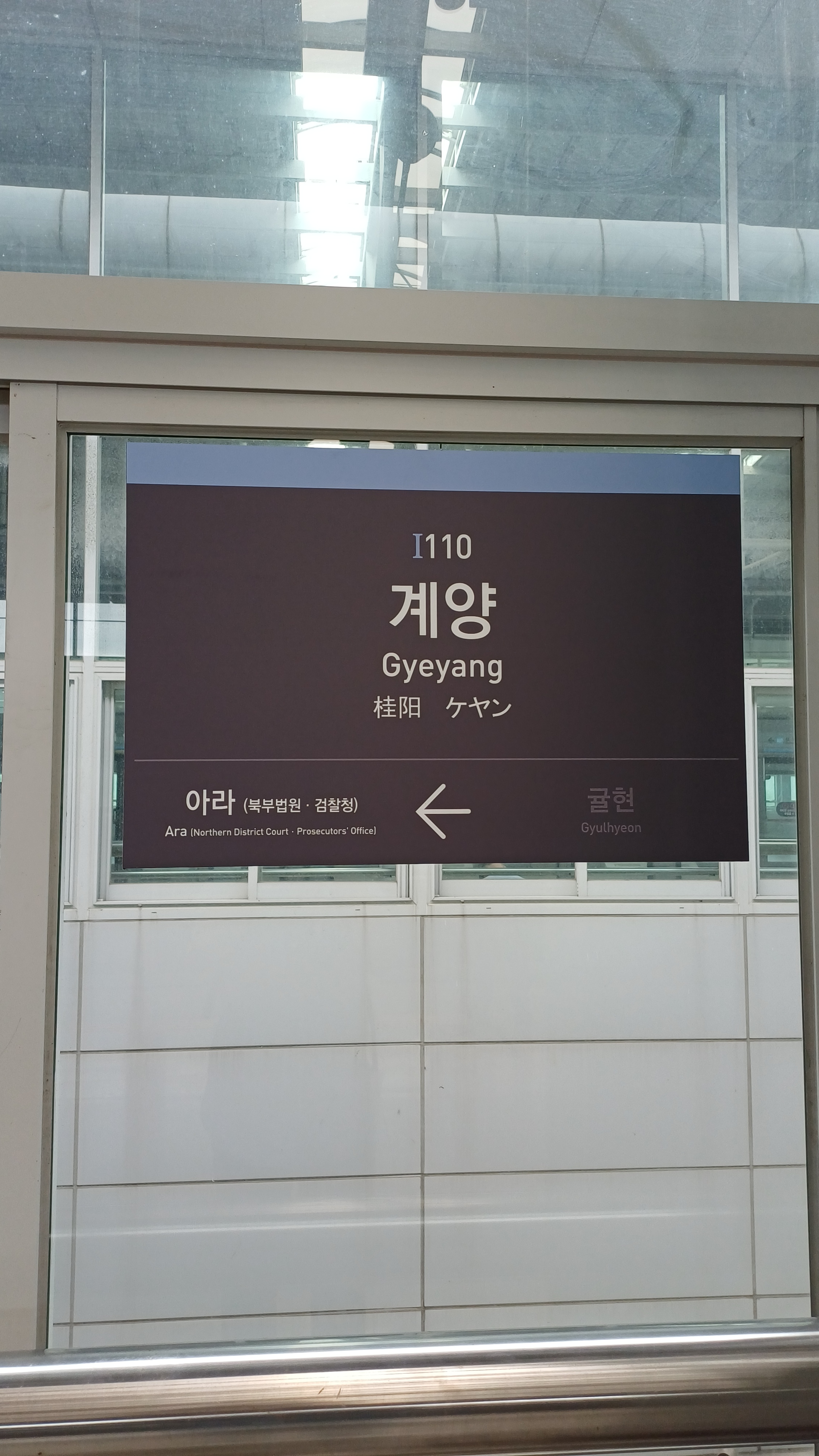
Incheon Line 1 station nameplate

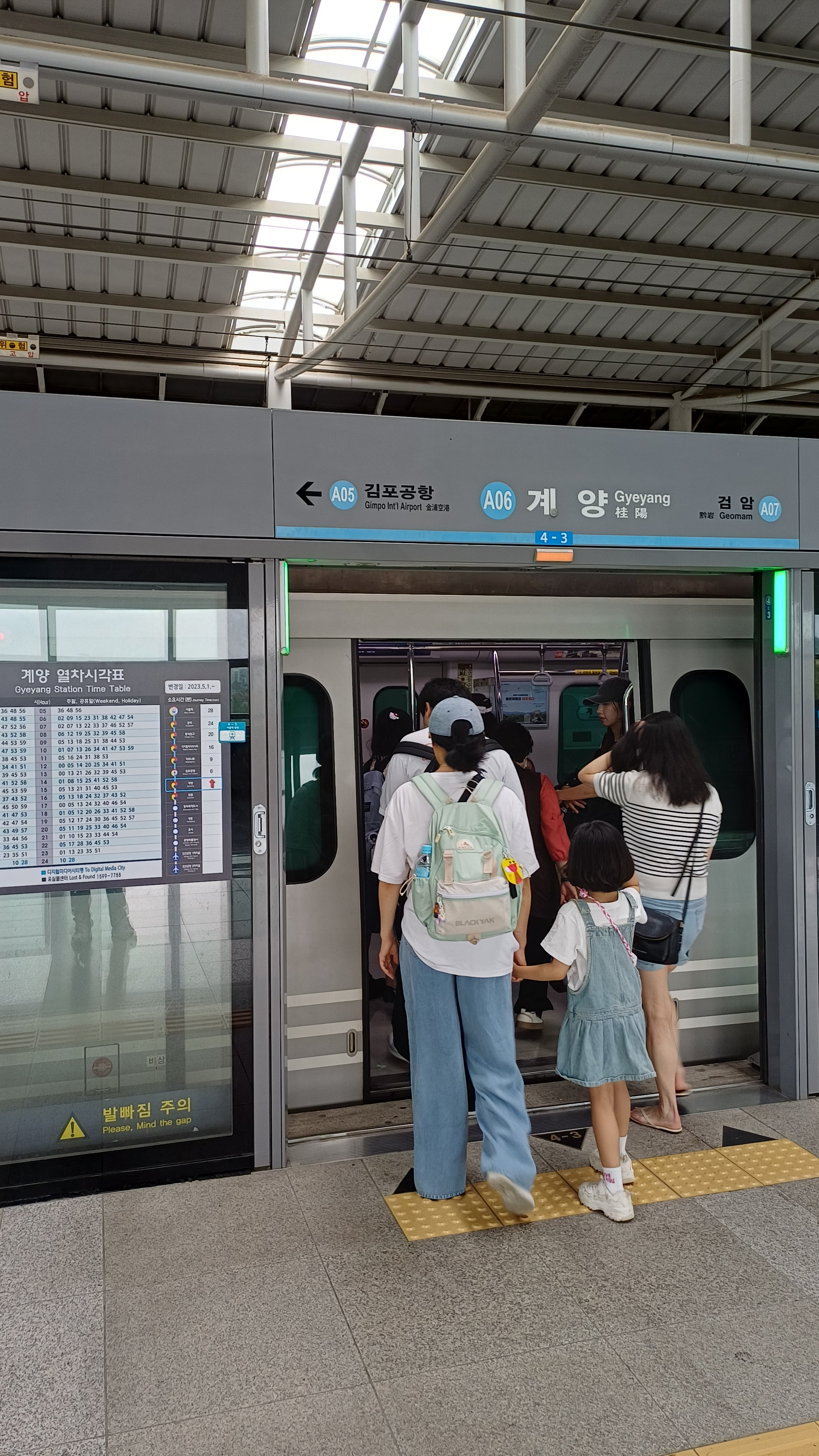
AREX Platform screen doors
