= International Business District station =

Metro station in Incheon, South Korea

Coordinates: 37.39995°N 126.63021°E

I138 국제업무지구 (센트로드) Int'l Business District (Centroad)
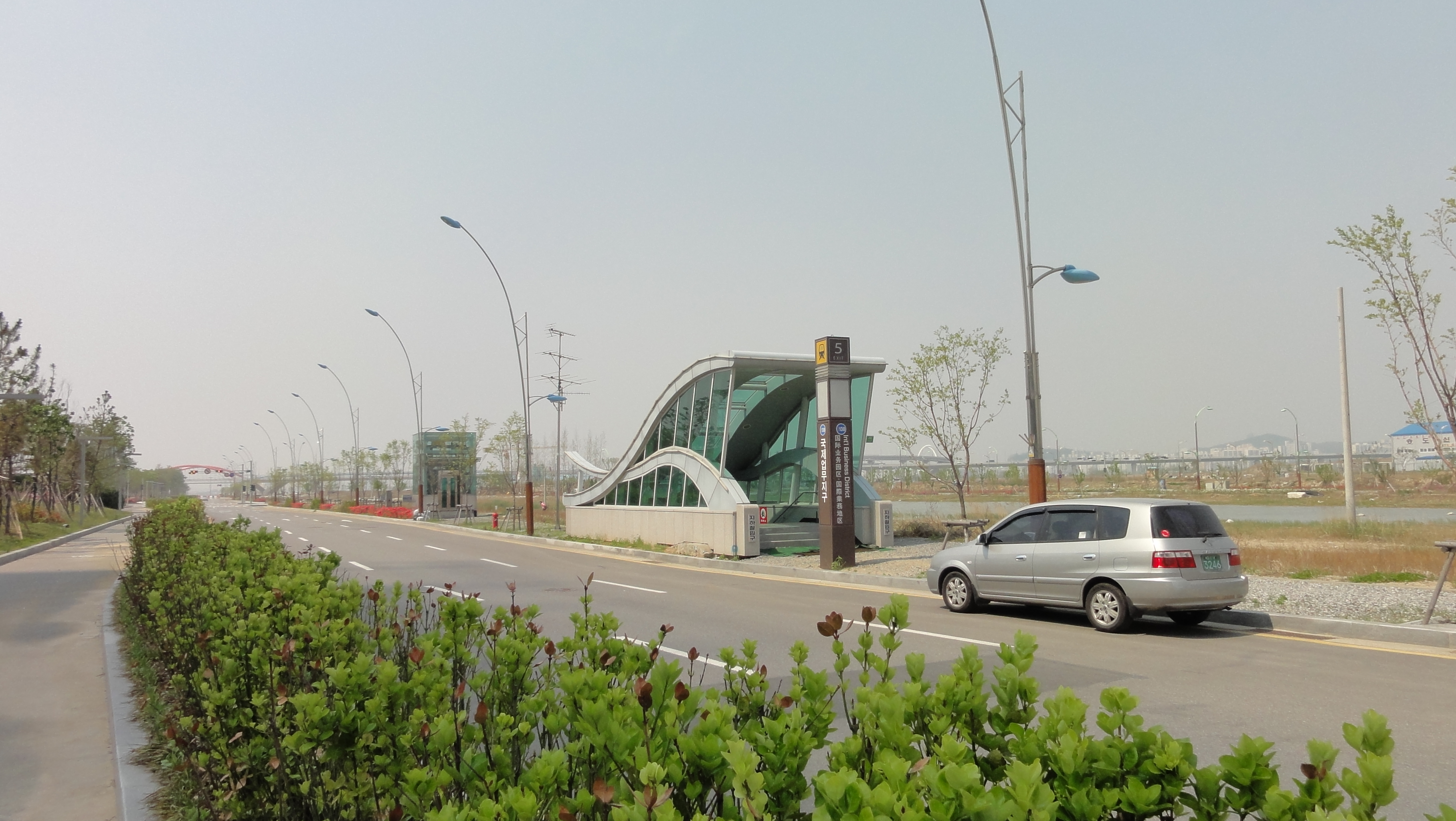
- International Business District station exit No. 5

Korean name
- Hangul: 국제업무지구역
- Hanja: 國際業務地區驛
- Revised Romanization: Gukje eommu jigu-yeok
- McCune–Reischauer: Kukche ŏmmu chigu-yŏk

General information
- Location: 78 Songdo-dong, Yeonsu-gu, Incheon
- Operator: Incheon Transit Corporation
- Line: Incheon Line 1
- Platforms: 2
- Tracks: 3

Construction
- Structure type: Underground

History
- Opened: June 1, 2009

Passengers
- 2017: 1,367

Services
Preceding station	Incheon Subway	Following station
Central Park towards Geomdan Lake Park	Incheon Line 1	Songdo Moonlight Festival Park Terminus
Location

International Business District Station (Korean: 국제업무지구역; Hanja: 國際業務地區驛) is a Line 1 subway station of the Incheon Subway in Yeonsu District, Incheon, South Korea. It is located in the Songdo International Business District.

== History ==
The station was opened on June 1, 2009, by the opening of the Songdo International City Extension.

== Station Layout ==
G	Street Level	Exits
L1	Concourse	Faregates, Ticketing Machines, Station Control
L2; Platforms	Northbound	← Line 1 toward Geomdan Lake Park (Central Park)
L2; Platforms	Island platform, doors will open on the left and right
L2; Platforms	Northbound	← Line 1 toward Geomdan Lake Park (Central Park)
L2; Platforms	Island platform, doors will open on the left and right
L2; Platforms	Southbound	→ Line 1 toward Songdo Moonlight Festival Park (Terminus)

== In popular culture ==
In 2012, the singer PSY 's Gangnam-style promotional video, which became a worldwide hit, captured some scenes at the station's platform.
