= Incheon National University station =

Metro station in Incheon, South Korea

Coordinates: 37.38594°N 126.63940°E

I136 인천대입구 (송도컨벤시아) Incheon National University (Songdo Convensia)
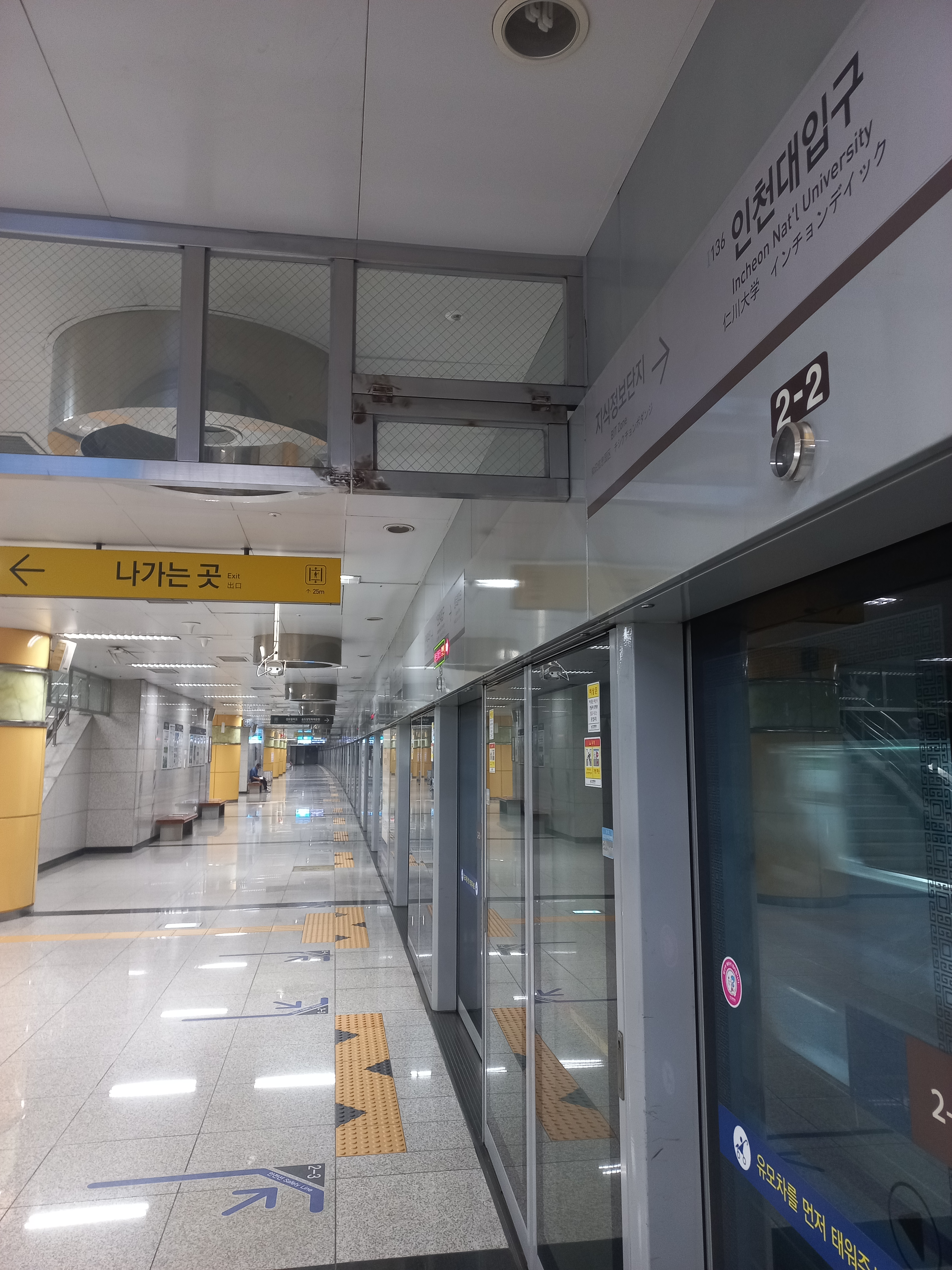

Korean name
- Hangul: 인천대입구역
- Hanja: 仁川大入口驛
- Revised Romanization: Incheondaeipgu-yeok
- McCune–Reischauer: Inch'ŏndaeipku-yŏk

General information
- Location: 48 Songdo-dong, Yeonsu-gu, Incheon
- Operator: Incheon Transit Corporation
- Line: Incheon Line 1
- Platforms: 2
- Tracks: 2
- Connections: Songdo Bus Transfer Center

Construction
- Structure type: Underground

Other information
- Station code: I136

History
- Opened: June 1, 2009

Passengers
- 2017: 9,476

Services
Preceding station	Incheon Subway	Following station
BIT Zone towards Geomdan Lake Park	Incheon Line 1	Central Park towards Songdo Moonlight Festival Park
Location

Incheon National University Station is a subway station on Line 1 of the Incheon Subway in Yeonsu District, Incheon, South Korea. It has four exits connecting it to Incheon National University, nearby hotels, and the east side of Songdo Central Park.

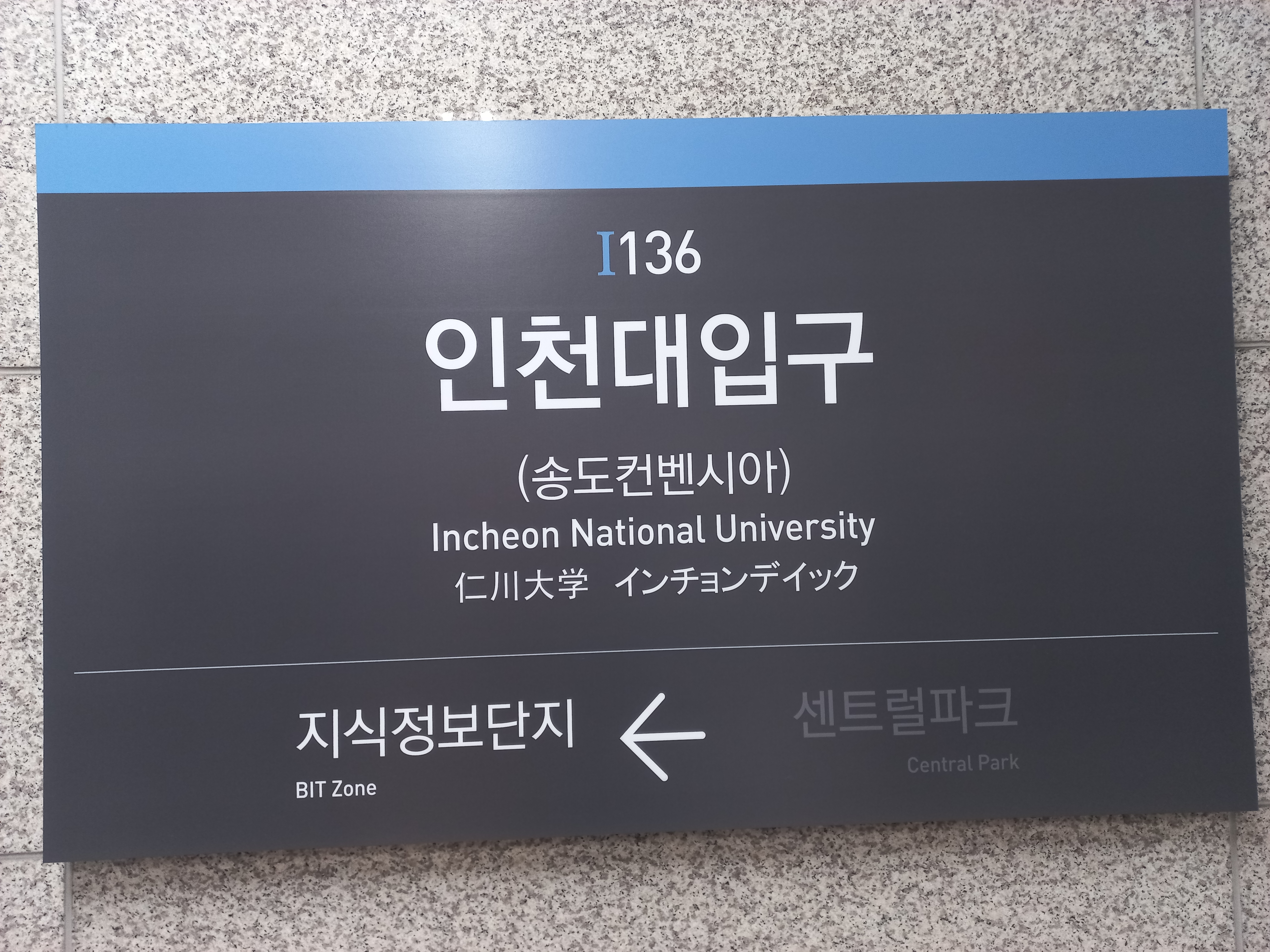

== Station layout ==
G	Street Level
L1	Concourse	Faregates, Ticketing Machines, Station Control
L2; Platforms	Side platform, doors will open on the right
L2; Platforms	Westbound	← Incheon Line 1 toward Geomdan Lake Park (BIT Zone)
L2; Platforms	Eastbound	→ Incheon Line 1 toward Songdo Moonlight Festival Park (Central Park) →
L2; Platforms	Side platform, doors will open on the right

== Neighborhood ==
- Songdo Convensia
- Benikea Premier Songdo Bridge Hotel
- Best Western Songdo Park Hotel
- Central Park
- Songdo International City Cathedral
- Songdo Bus Transfer Center (located in Tomorrow City)
- Songdo 1-dong Administrative Welfare Center
- Sheraton Incheon Hotel
- Incheon National University
- Jack Nicklaus Golf Club
- Tomorrow City
