= Bupyeong-gu Office station =

Metro station in Incheon, South Korea

I118
부평구청 (세림병원)
Bupyeong-gu Office
(Serim General Hospital)
부평구청 (세림병원); Bupyeong-gu Office (Serim General Hospital)
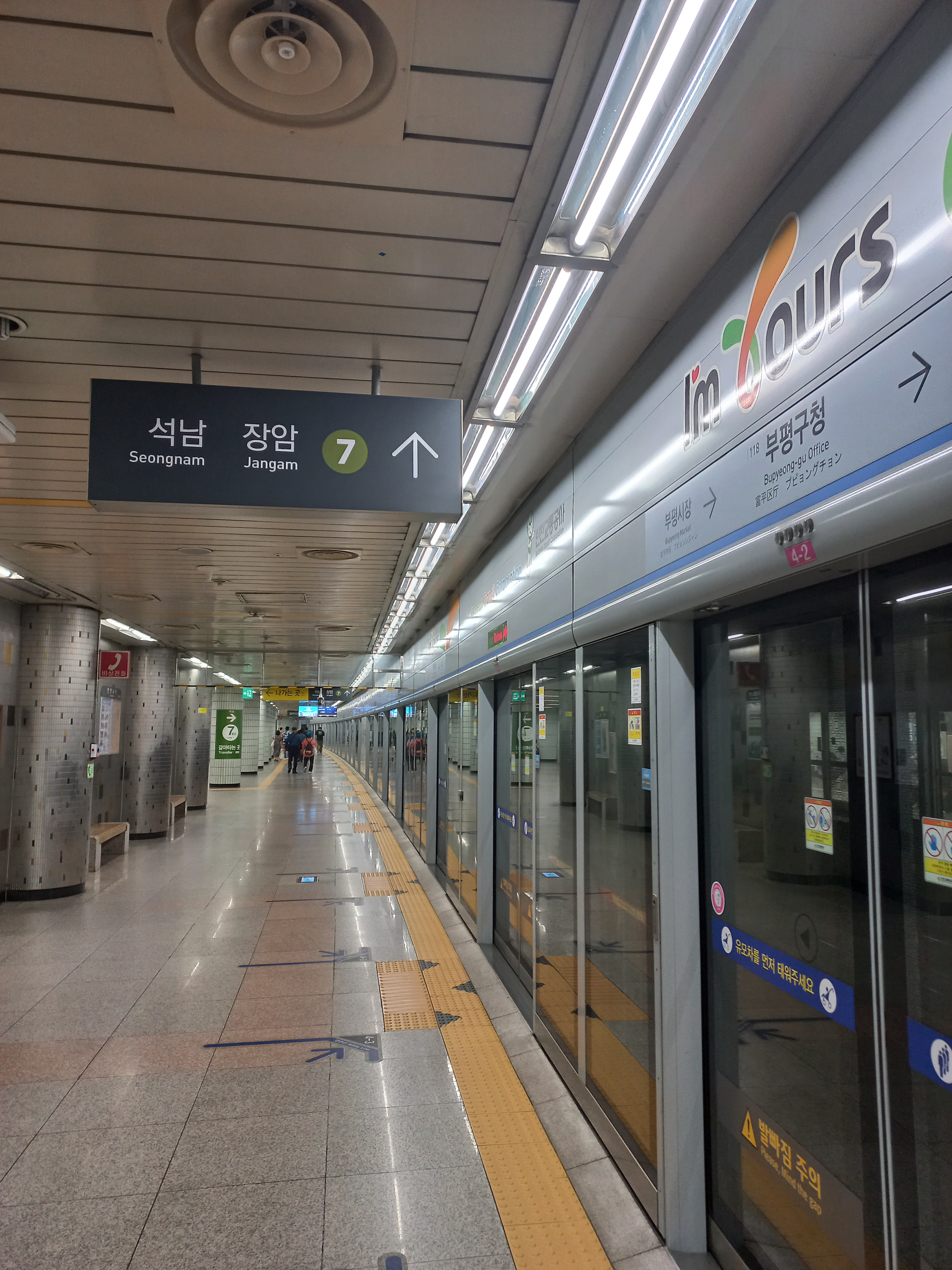
- Incheon Line 1 platform

Korean name
- Hangul: 부평구청역
- Hanja: 富平區廳驛
- Revised Romanization: Bupyeong-gucheong-yeok
- McCune–Reischauer: Pup'yŏng-guch'ŏng-yŏk

General information
- Location: 112 Cheongcheon-dong, Jiha 189 Bupyeongdaero; Bupyeong-gu, Incheon; South Korea
- Coordinates: 37°30′30″N 126°43′14″E
- Operator: Incheon Transit Corporation
- Lines: Incheon Line 1 Line 7
- Platforms: 2
- Tracks: 2

Construction
- Structure type: Underground

History
- Opened: October 6, 1999; 26 years ago Incheon Line 1 October 27, 2012; 13 years ago Line 7

Services
Preceding station	Incheon Subway	Following station
Galsan towards Geomdan Lake Park	Incheon Line 1	Bupyeong Market towards Songdo Moonlight Festival Park
Preceding station	Seoul Metropolitan Subway	Following station
Gulpocheon towards Jangam	Line 7	Sangok towards Seongnam
Location

Bupyeong-gu Office Station is a subway station on Line 1 of the Incheon Subway. In October 2012, it was connected to the Seoul Subway Line 7 and was the terminal station until the next extension to Seongnam was completed on 22 May 2021.

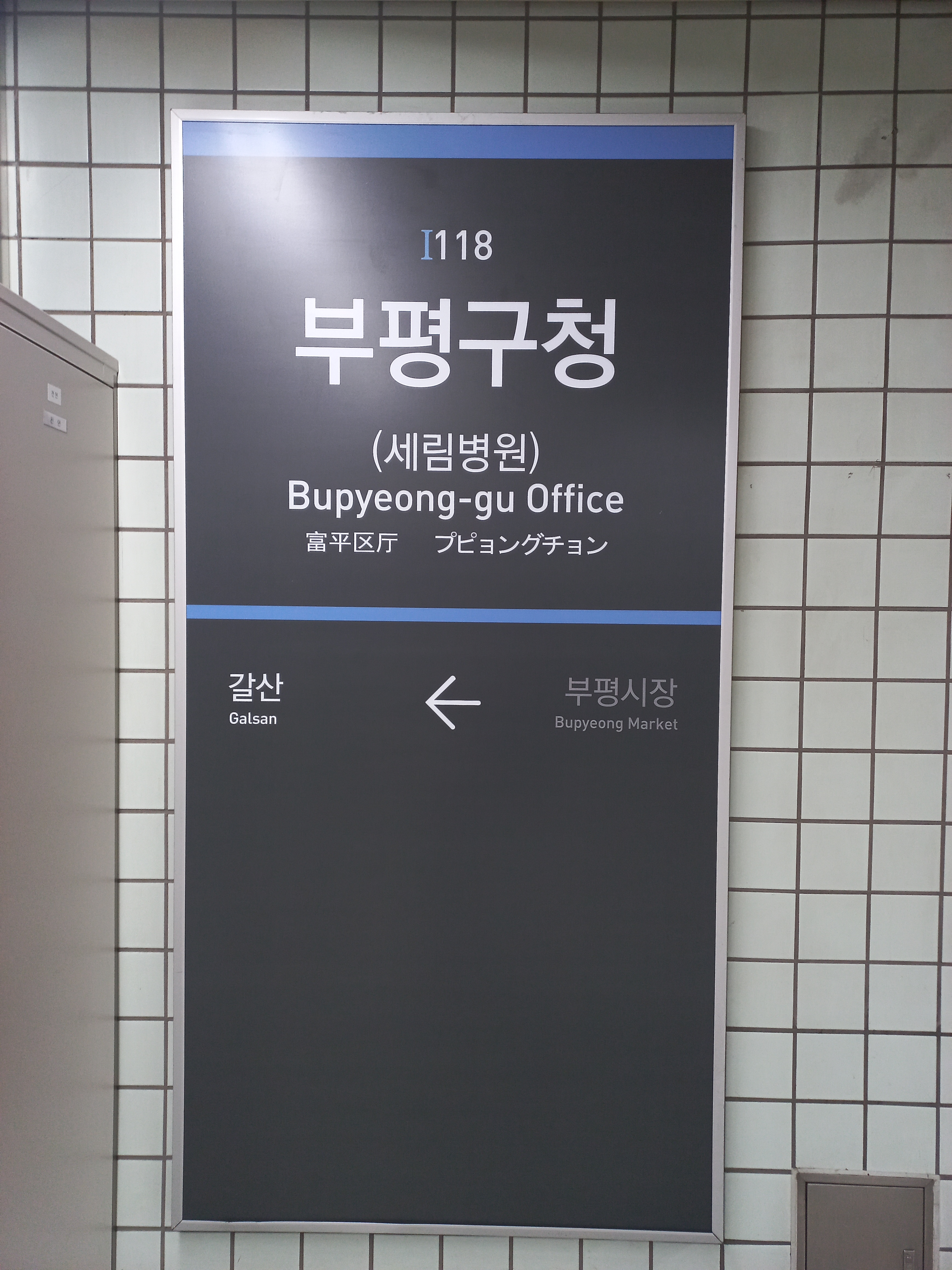
Incheon Line 1 station nameplate

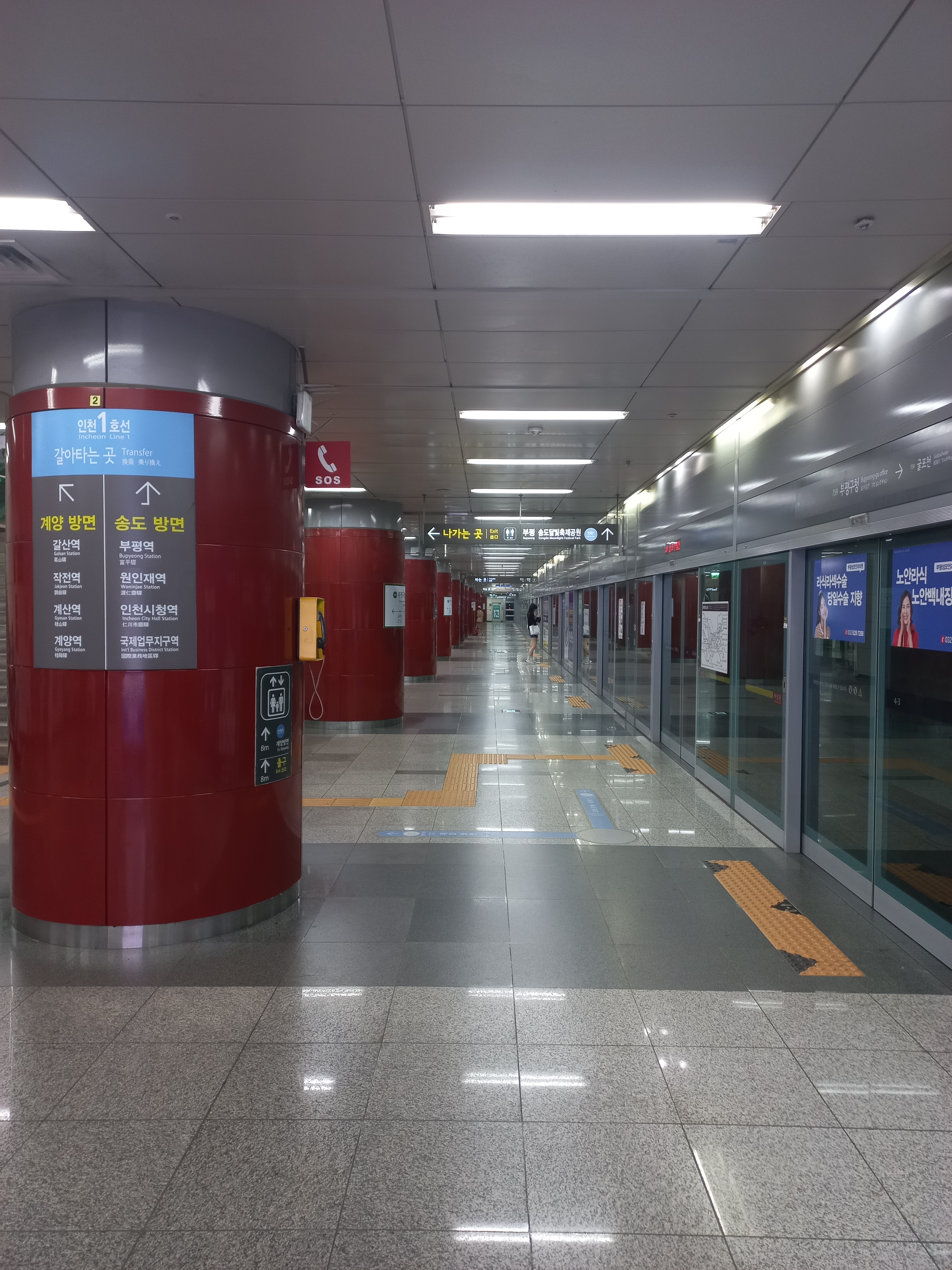
Line 7 platform

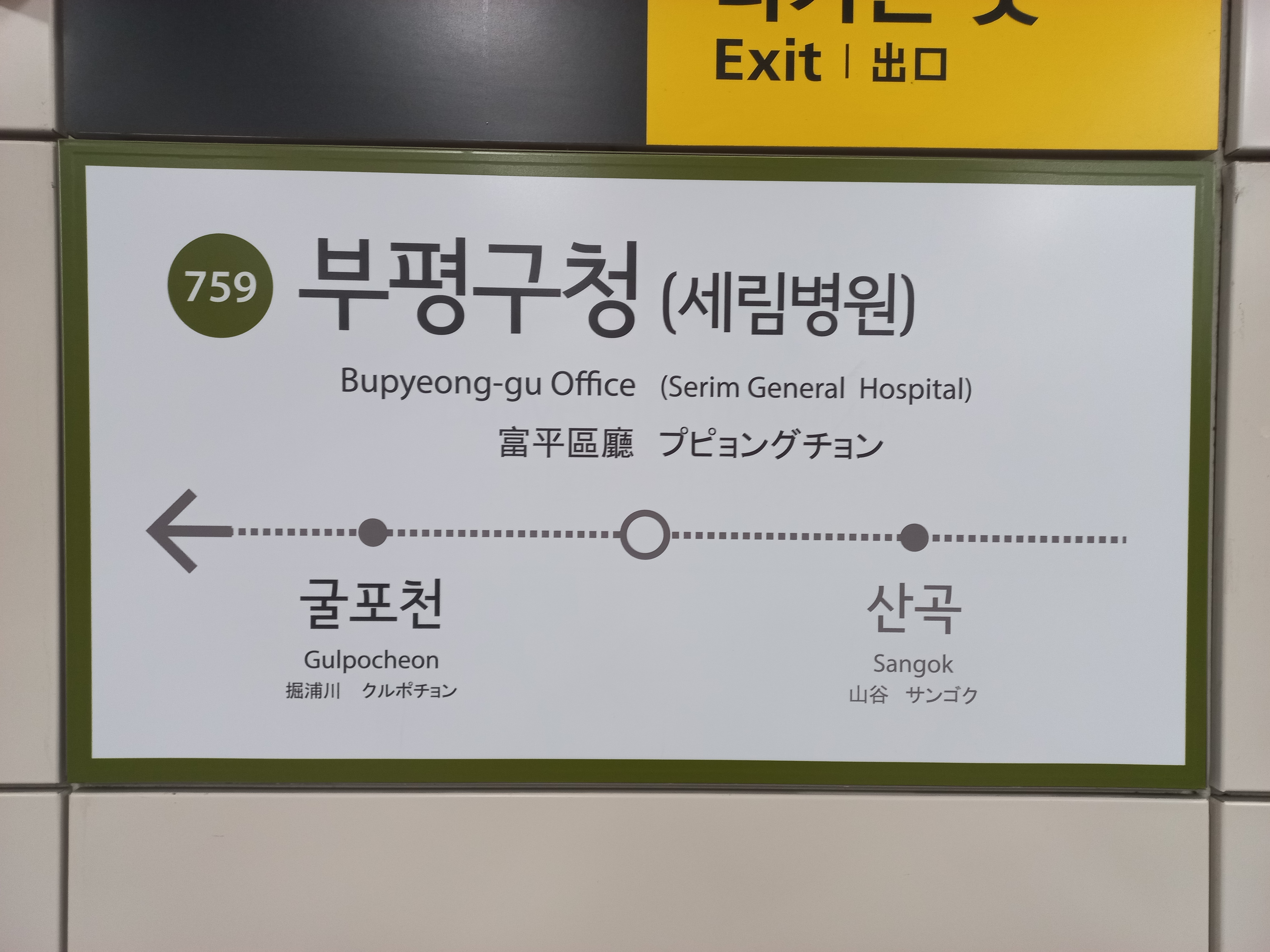
Line 7 station nameplate

== Station layout ==
=== Incheon Metro Line 1 ===
Galsan ↑
S/B | | N/B
↓ Bupyeong Market

Southbound	← ● Incheon Line 1 toward Songdo Moonlight Festival Park
Northbound	● Incheon Line 1 toward Geomdan Lake Park →

=== Seoul Subway Line 7 ===
Gulpocheon ↑
S/B | | N/B
↓ Sangok

Southbound	← ● Line 7 toward Seongnam
Northbound	● Line 7 toward Jangam →

== Vicinity ==
- Exit 1 : Galsan middle school, Eorinyi park, Galsan elementary school, Bupyeong technical high school, Galwol elementary school
- Exit 2 : Geunlin park, Bupyeong-gu office, Gaeheung elementary school
- Exit 3 :
- Exit 4 :
- Exit 5 :
- Exit 6 :
- Exit 7 :
- Exit 8 : Bupyeong police office, Bupyeong Selim Hospital, Majang elementary school, Daewoo Motors South gate
- Exit 9 : Daewoo Motors main gate
