= Dongmak station =

Metro station in Incheon, South Korea

I132 동막 (저어새 생태학습관) Dongmak (The Bird's Ecology Learning Center)
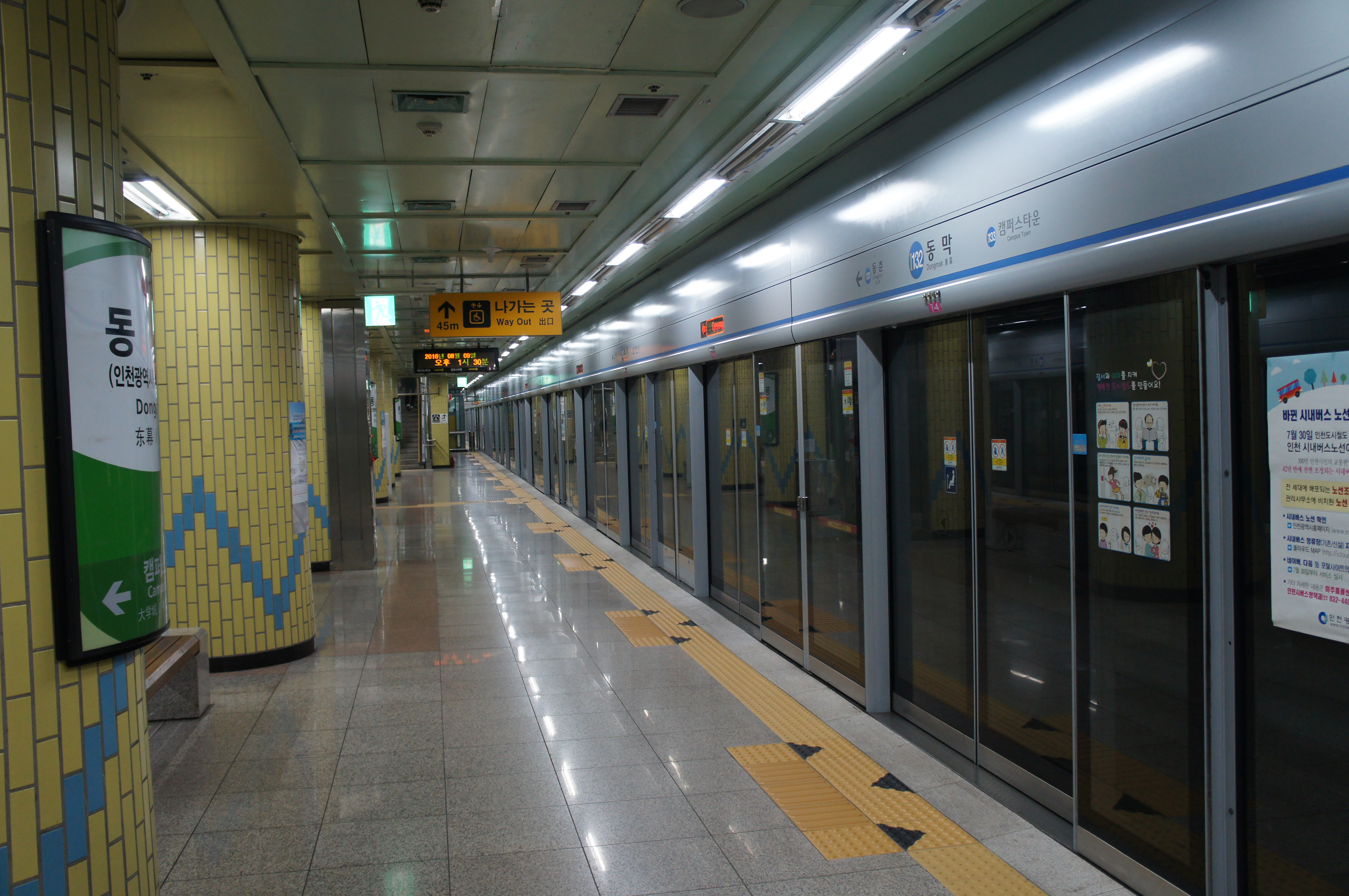

Korean name
- Hangul: 동막역
- Hanja: 東幕驛
- Revised Romanization: Dongmangnyeok
- McCune–Reischauer: Tongmangnyŏk

General information
- Location: 927-1 Dongchun-dong, Jiha80, Gyeongwon-daero, Yeonsu-gu, Incheon
- Coordinates: 37°23′52″N 126°40′26″E
- Operator: Incheon Transit Corporation
- Line: Incheon Line 1
- Platforms: 2 (1 in use)
- Tracks: 3

Construction
- Structure type: Underground

Other information
- Station code: I132

History
- Opened: October 6, 1999

Passengers
- 2017: 12,112

Services
Preceding station	Incheon Subway	Following station
Dongchun towards Geomdan Lake Park	Incheon Line 1	Campus Town towards Songdo Moonlight Festival Park
Location

Dongmak Station is a subway station on Line 1 of the Incheon Subway in Jiha80, Gyeongwon-daero, Yeonsu District, Incheon, South Korea.

== Exits ==
Exit No.	Image	Destinations
1		Namdong industrial complex
2		Namdong industrial complex
3		Daegeon high school Songdo new city
4		Dongchun-2-dong office Incheon girls' technical high school Seomyeon elementary school Dongchun elementary school
