= Incheon Subway Line 1 =

Subway line in Incheon, South Korea

Incheon Line 1
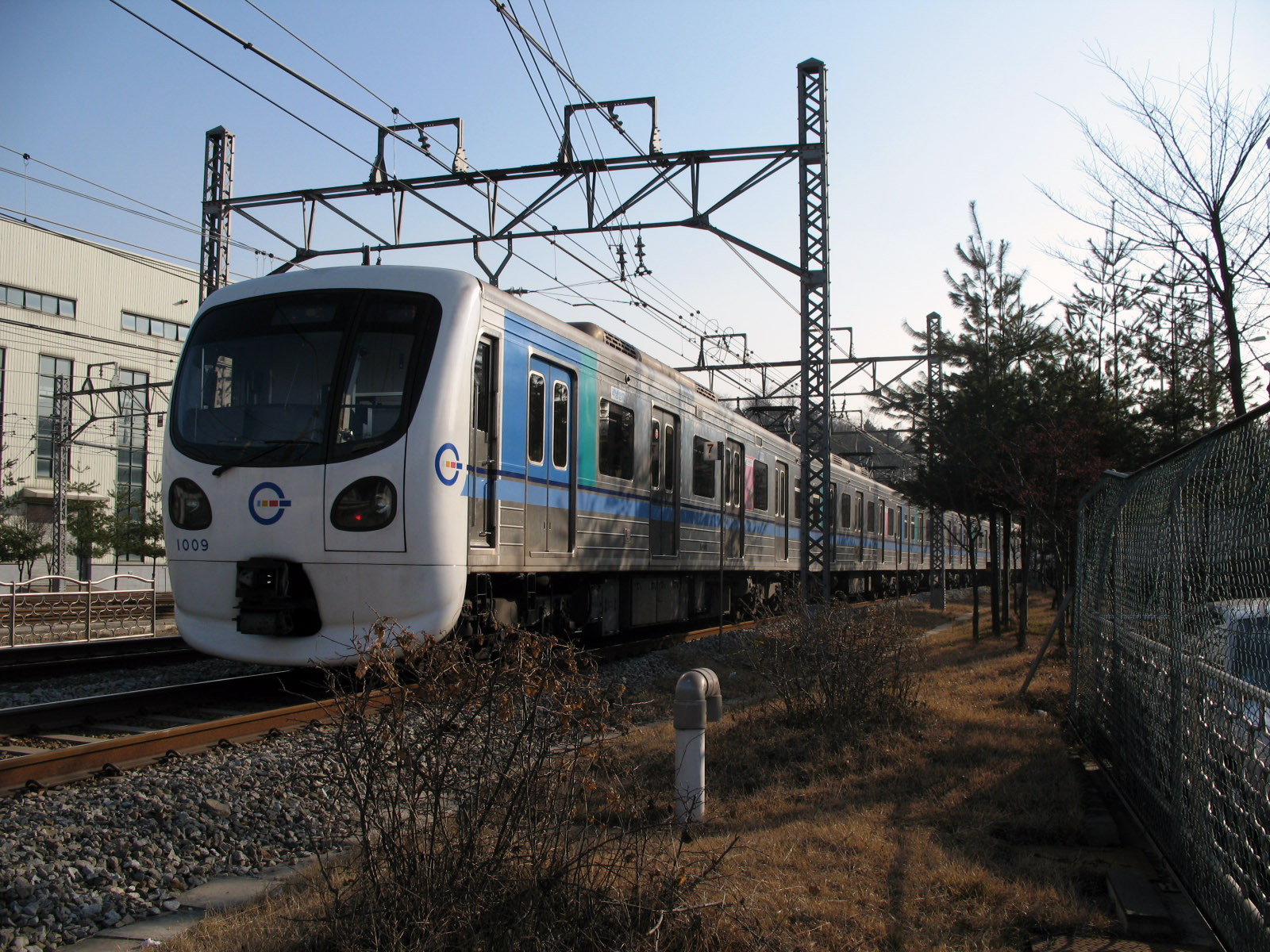

Overview
- Native name: 인천 1호선(仁川一號線); Incheon Il Hoseon
- Status: Operational
- Termini: Geomdan Lake Park; Songdo Moonlight Festival Park station
- Stations: 33

Service
- Type: Rapid transit
- System: Incheon Subway
- Operator: Incheon Transit Corporation

History
- Opened: October 6, 1999; 27 years ago
- Last extension: 2025

Technical
- Line length: 37.1 km (23.1 mi)
- Num of tracks: 2
- Electrification: 1,500 V DC overhead catenary
Route map

Incheon Subway Line 1 (Korean: 인천도시철도 1호선) is a 30.3-kilometer (18.8 mi) north-south subway line, part of the Incheon Subway system. The line is also included as a part of the overall Seoul Metropolitan Subway network; Bupyeong Station has a free transfer with Seoul Subway Line 1, Gyeyang Station connects with the AREX Line which leads to Incheon International Airport and Seoul Station, Bupyeong-gu Office Station has a free transfer with Seoul Subway Line 7, and Woninjae Station has a free transfer with the Suin-Bundang Line.

== Background ==
Incheon's Line 1 makes Incheon the fourth city in South Korea and fifth in the Korean Peninsula with a subway system, after Pyongyang, Seoul, Busan, and Daegu.

A trip along the line from Gyeyang in the north to the International Business District in the south takes approximately 57 minutes. From Bakchon station to the International Business District station, the line is underground.

== History ==
- March 1999: Trial runs begin.
- October 6, 1999: The line opens from Bakchon to Dongmak, after six years of construction.
- December 7, 1999: A northern extension from Bakchon to Gyulhyeon opens.
- March 16, 2007: Another northern extension from Gyulhyeon to Gyeyang opens, connecting with the Airport Railroad
- June 1, 2009: A southern extension from Dongmak to International Business District opens.
- December 12, 2020: One stop extension to Songdo Moonlight Festival Park opens.
- June 28, 2025: A northern extension from Gyeyang to Geomdan Lake Park opens.

== Rolling stock ==
The line uses 34 8-car trains. The first 25 trains were built between 1998 and 1999 by Daewoo Heavy Industries and Rotem, while the last 9 trains were built between 2007 and 2008 by Hyundai Rotem to provide trains following the extension of the line.

== Stations ==
All stations are located in Incheon.

Station Number	Station Name English	Station Name Hangul	Transfer	Distance in km	Total Distance	Location
I107	Geomdan Lake Park	검단호수공원		---	0.0	Geomdan-gu
I108	Singeomdanjungang	신검단중앙		0.8	0.8	Geomdan-gu
I109	Ara (Northern District Court & Prosecutors' Office)	아라 (북부법원·검찰청)		2.0	2.8	Geomdan-gu
I110	Gyeyang	계양	AREX	4.0	6.8	Gyeyang-gu
I111	Gyulhyeon	귤현		0.9	7.7	Gyeyang-gu
I112	Bakchon	박촌		1.5	9.2	Gyeyang-gu
I113	Imhak	임학		1.1	10.3	Gyeyang-gu
I114	Gyesan	계산 (경인여자대학교)		1.1	11.4	Gyeyang-gu
I115	Gyeong-in National University of Education	경인교대입구 (상록호텔조리직업전문학교)		0.9	12.3	Gyeyang-gu
I116	Jakjeon	작전 (인천세종병원)		0.9	13.2	Gyeyang-gu
I117	Galsan	갈산 (경문실용전문학교)		1.4	14.6	Bupyeong-gu
I118	Bupyeong-gu Office	부평구청 (로이문화예술 실용전문학교)	Seoul Subway Line 7	1.0	15.6	Bupyeong-gu
I119	Bupyeong Market	부평시장 (한길안과의원)		1.1	16.7	Bupyeong-gu
I120	Bupyeong	부평 (부평힘찬병원)	Seoul Subway Line 1	0.9	17.6	Bupyeong-gu
I121	Dongsu	동수		0.9	18.5	Bupyeong-gu
I122	Bupyeongsamgeori	부평삼거리		1.1	19.6	Bupyeong-gu
I123	Ganseogogeori	간석오거리		1.2	20.8	Namdong-gu
I124	Incheon City Hall	인천시청역	Incheon Subway Line 2	1.4	22.2	Namdong-gu
I125	Culture & Arts Center	예술회관 (가천대 길병원)		1.0	23.2	Namdong-gu
I126	Incheon Bus Terminal	인천터미널 (푸른세상안과)		0.8	24.0	Michuhol-gu
I127	Munhak Sports Complex	문학경기장 (그랜드오스티엄웨딩컨벤션)		0.8	24.8	Yeonsu-gu
I128	Seonhak	선학		0.8	25.6	Yeonsu-gu
I129	Sinyeonsu	신연수 (가천대학교 메디컬캠퍼스)		1.1	26.7	Yeonsu-gu
I130	Woninjae	원인재	Suin–Bundang Line	0.9	27.6	Yeonsu-gu
I131	Dongchun	동춘 (스퀘어원)		1.1	28.7	Yeonsu-gu
I132	Dongmak	동막 (저어새 생태학습관)		1.0	29.7	Yeonsu-gu
I133	Campus Town	캠퍼스타운 (연세대학교)		1.6	31.3	Yeonsu-gu
I134	Technopark	테크노파크 (현대프리미엄아울렛송도점)		0.8	32.1	Yeonsu-gu
I135	BIT Zone	지식정보단지		1.4	33.5	Yeonsu-gu
I136	Incheon National University	인천대입구 (송도컨벤시아)		1.0	34.5	Yeonsu-gu
I137	Central Park	센트럴파크 (포스코건설)		0.9	35.4	Yeonsu-gu
I138	International Business District	국제업무지구 (센트로드)		0.8	36.2	Yeonsu-gu
I139	Songdo Moonlight Festival Park	송도달빛축제공원		0.9	37.1	Yeonsu-gu

== See also ==
- Incheon Subway
- List of metro systems
- Seoul Metropolitan Subway
- Transportation in South Korea
