= Geomdan District =

District of Incheon, South Korea

Geomdan
- Autonomous District
- Flag
- Interactive map of Geomdan
- Country: South Korea
- Region: Sudogwon
- Provincial level: Incheon
- Administrative divisions: 8 administrative dong

Area
  - Total: 47.61 km^{2} (18.38 sq mi)

Population (2026)
  - Total: 268,000
  - Dialect: Seoul
- Website: geomdan.go.kr

Korean name
- Hangul: 검단구
- Hanja: 黔丹區
- RR: Geomdan-gu
- MR: Kŏmdan-gu

Geomdan District (Korean: 검단구) is a district of Incheon, South Korea. It was established on July 1, 2026 after being split from the former Seo District.

== Administrative divisions ==
- Geomdan-dong and Majeon-dong (divided into Geumgok-dong and parts of Majeon-dong)
- Bullo-Daegok-dong (divided into Bullo-dong and Daegok-dong)
- Wondang-dong, Ara 1-dong, and Ara 2-dong (divided into parts of Wondang-dong and parts of Dangha-dong)
- Dangha-dong (divided into Baekseok-dong, Sicheon-dong, and parts of Dangha-dong, Wondang-dong, and Majeon-dong)
- Oryu-Wanggil-dong (divided into Oryu-dong and Wanggil-dong)
