= Incheon Subway =

Rapid transit system in Incheon, South Korea

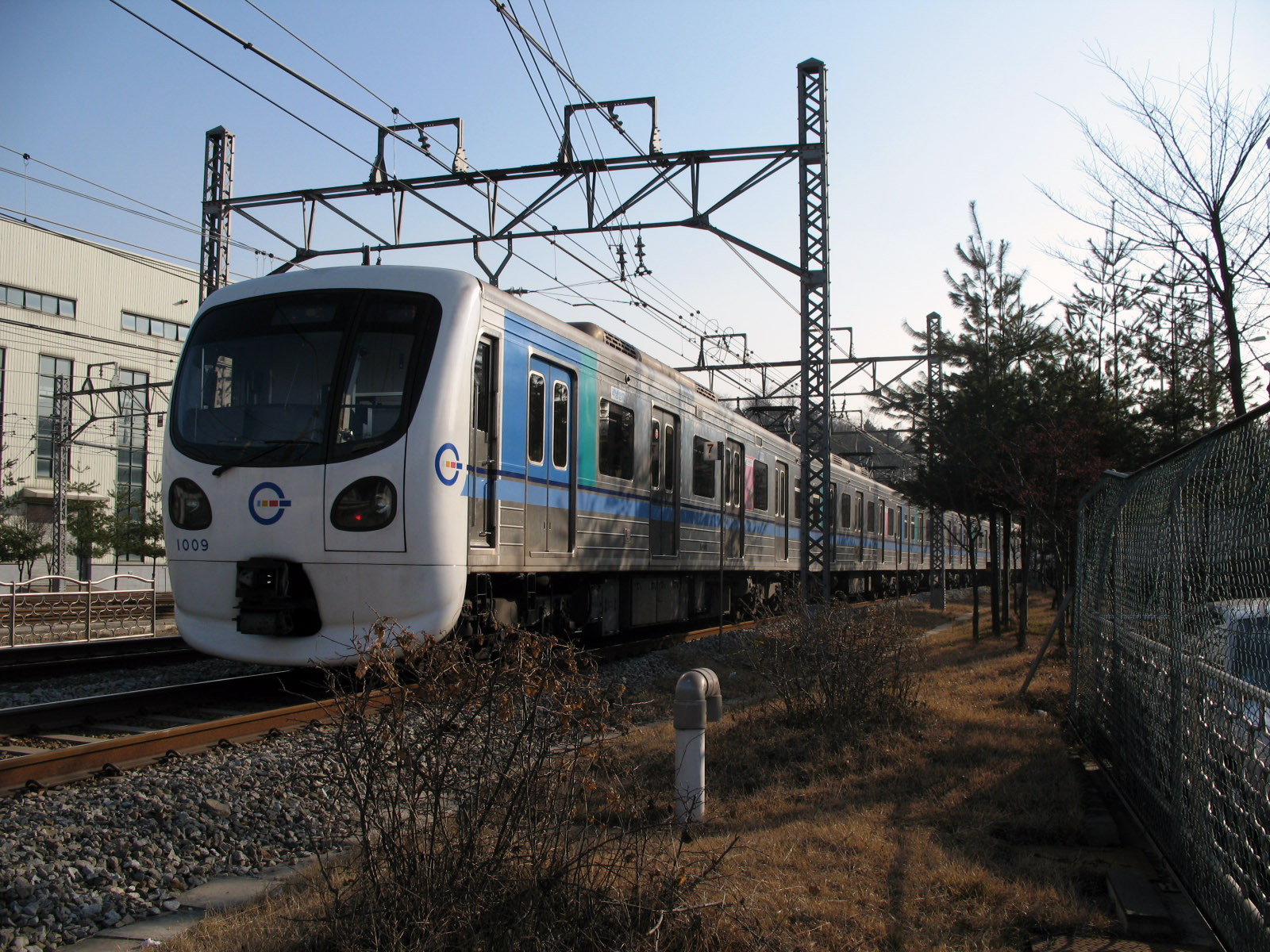

Overview
- Owner: Incheon City Government
- Locale: Incheon, South Korea
- Transit type: Rapid transit
- Number of lines: 3
- Number of stations: 65
- Daily ridership: 199,527

Operation
- Began operation: October 6, 1999; 27 years ago
- Operator: Incheon Transit Corporation

Technical
- System length: 73.7 km (45.8 mi)
- Track gauge: 1,435 mm (4 ft 8 1/2 in)
System map

- Incheon Subway
- Hangul: 인천 도시철도
- Hanja: 仁川都市鐵道
- RR: Incheon dosi cheoldo
- MR: Inch'ŏn tosi ch'ŏlto

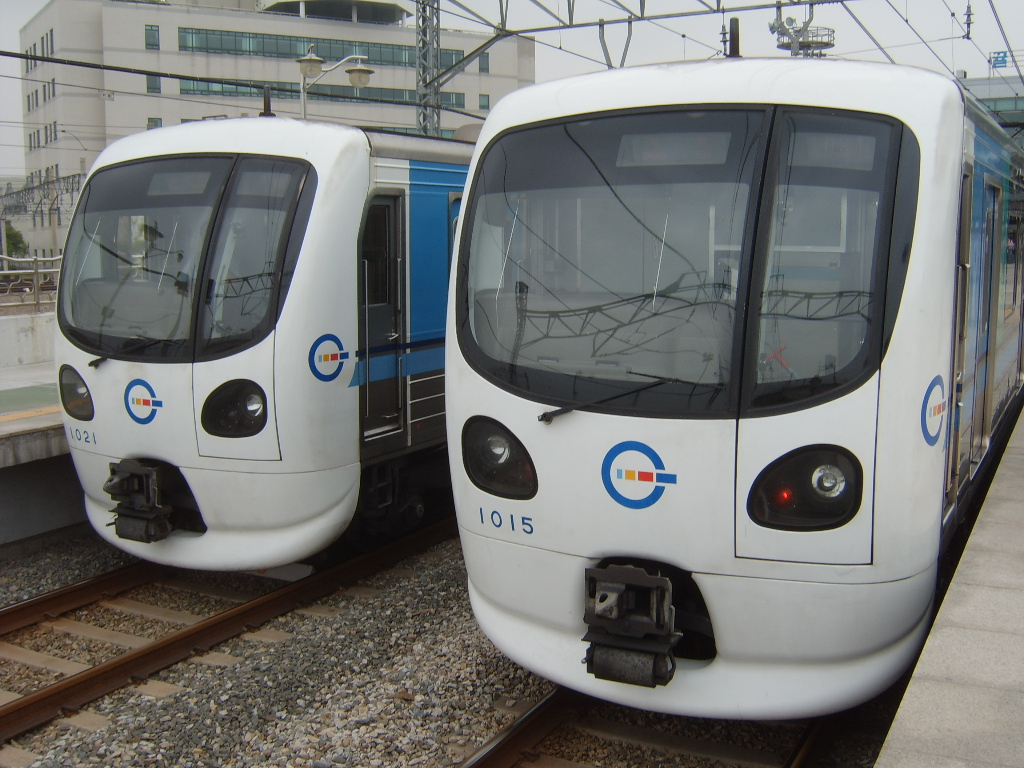
ITC Class 1000

The Incheon Subway (Korean: 인천 도시철도) is a subway system serving the South Korean city of Incheon. The system is operated by Incheon Transit Corporation, and is part of the greater Seoul Metropolitan Subway.

== Lines ==
The Incheon Subway currently has two lines running entirely within the titular region, as well as having connections to the greater metropolitan area through Seoul Metro Line 7.

Line Name English	Line Name Hangul	Starting Station(s)	Ending Station(s)	Stations	Total Length in km
Line 1	1호선	Geomdan Lake Park	Songdo Moonlight Festival Park	33	37.1 km
Line 2	2호선	Geomdan Oryu	Unyeon	27	29.1 km
Seoul Subway Line 7	수도권 전철 7호선	Onsu station	Seongnam station, Incheon	11	14.1 km

=== Line 1 ===
Line 1 is a 30.3-kilometer (18.8 mi) north-south subway line. After six years of construction, the line opened for regular service on October 6, 1999 as the fourth subway system in South Korea, after Seoul, Busan, and Daegu. Transfers to the Seoul Metropolitan Subway can be made via Bupyeong Station to Seoul Subway Line 1, as well as the Suin Line to Seoul at Woninjae Station. A trip along the line from Gyeyang in the north to International Business District in the south takes approximately 57 minutes. The color of the line is light blue.

A one-station extension to Gyeyang opened in March 2007, providing transfers to AREX. A six-station south extension opened in June 2009.

The line uses 34 8-car trains. The first 25 trains were built between 1998 and 1999 by Daewoo Heavy Industries and Rotem, while the last 9 trains were built between 2007 and 2008 by Hyundai Rotem to provide trains following the extension of the line.

=== Line 2 ===
Line 2 is a 29.1-kilometer (18.1 mi) north-south light metro line. After seven years of construction, the line opened for regular service on July 30, 2016. There are transfer points at Geomam (with AREX), Juan (with Seoul Subway Line 1), and Incheon City Hall (with Incheon Line 1). Line 2 has aboveground sections north of Asiad Stadium. The color of the line is Orange.

The line uses 37 2-car trains, all of which were built in 2013 by Hyundai Rotem.

=== Seoul Metro Line 7 ===
Line 7 on the Seoul Subway was extended beyond Onsu Station with 9 additional stations beyond Seoul City and into Incheon on October 27, 2012. The 10.2-kilometer (6.3 mi) extension had ended at Bupyeong-gu Office Station, meeting Incheon Subway Line 1. On May 22, 2021, Line 7 was extended deeper into Incheon with the opening of the 3.94-kilometer (2.45 mi) extension to Seongnam. The section of the line in Incheon and Bucheon Cities are operated by Incheon Transit Corporation with their own fleet of Incheon Transit Corporation SR000 series trains, and both fleets through service into each other's portion of the line. Future plans call for the relevant portion of the line to extended all the way to Cheongna International City station, with transfers available to AREX.

== Expansion ==
=== Line 3 ===
The future Line 3 is planned to be a circular line of the Incheon Subway. It will intersect Seoul Subway Line 1 at Dowon Station and Incheon Subway Line 1 at Dongmak Station. The color will be Light Green.

=== Juan-Songdo Line ===
Juan Songdo Line is a 14.1-kilometer (8.8 mi) long tram line proposed by Incheon City. Construction starts in 2028 and aims to operate in 2033. The vehicle will be operated with one vehicle (5 modules) of streetcar vehicles and can accommodate 48 seats and 171 standing seats. It will be operated with 12 vehicles, and the driving time at the peak is 4.5 minutes.There are transfer points at Juan (with Seoul Subway Line 1), (with Incheon Subway Line 2), Citizens Park (with Incheon Subway Line 2), Inha University, Hagik, Songdo (with Suin-Bundang Line), and Incheon National University (with Incheon Subway Line 2)

== Fare ==
The basic adult fare is ₩1,250 if you pay by card and ₩1,300 if you pay in cash.

== See also ==
- Transport in South Korea
- Incheon
- Seoul Metropolitan Subway - the bigger urban rail system that Incheon Metro is incorporated into
- List of metro systems
