= Geomdan Lake Park station =

Metro station in Incheon, South Korea

I107 검단호수공원 Geomdan Lake Park
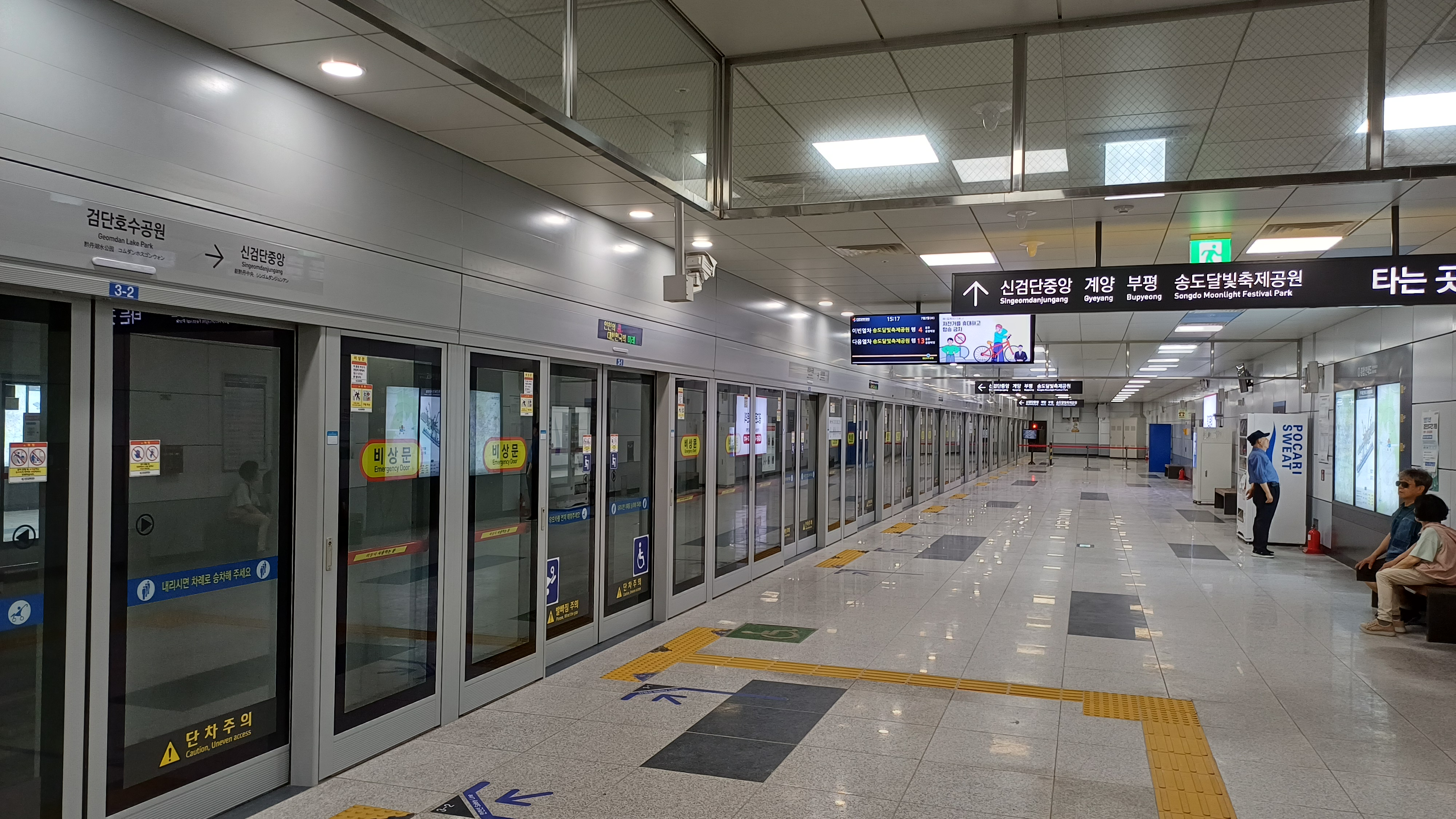
- Station platform

Korean name
- Hangul: 검단호수공원역
- Hanja: 黔丹湖水公園驛
- RR: Geomdan hosu gongwon-yeok
- MR: Kŏmdan hosu kongwŏn-yŏk

General information
- Location: 608-16 Bullo-dong, Geomdan District, Incheon
- Operator: Incheon Transit Corporation
- Line: Incheon Line 1
- Platforms: 2
- Tracks: 2

Construction
- Structure type: Underground

History
- Opened: June 28, 2025; 14 months ago

Services
Preceding station	Incheon Subway	Following station
Terminus	Incheon Line 1	Singeomdanjungang towards Songdo Moonlight Festival Park
Location

Geomdan Lake Park station (Korean: 검단호수공원역) is a Line 1 subway station of the Incheon Subway in Geomdan District, Incheon. This station is a northern terminus of Line 1. It opened on June 28, 2025.

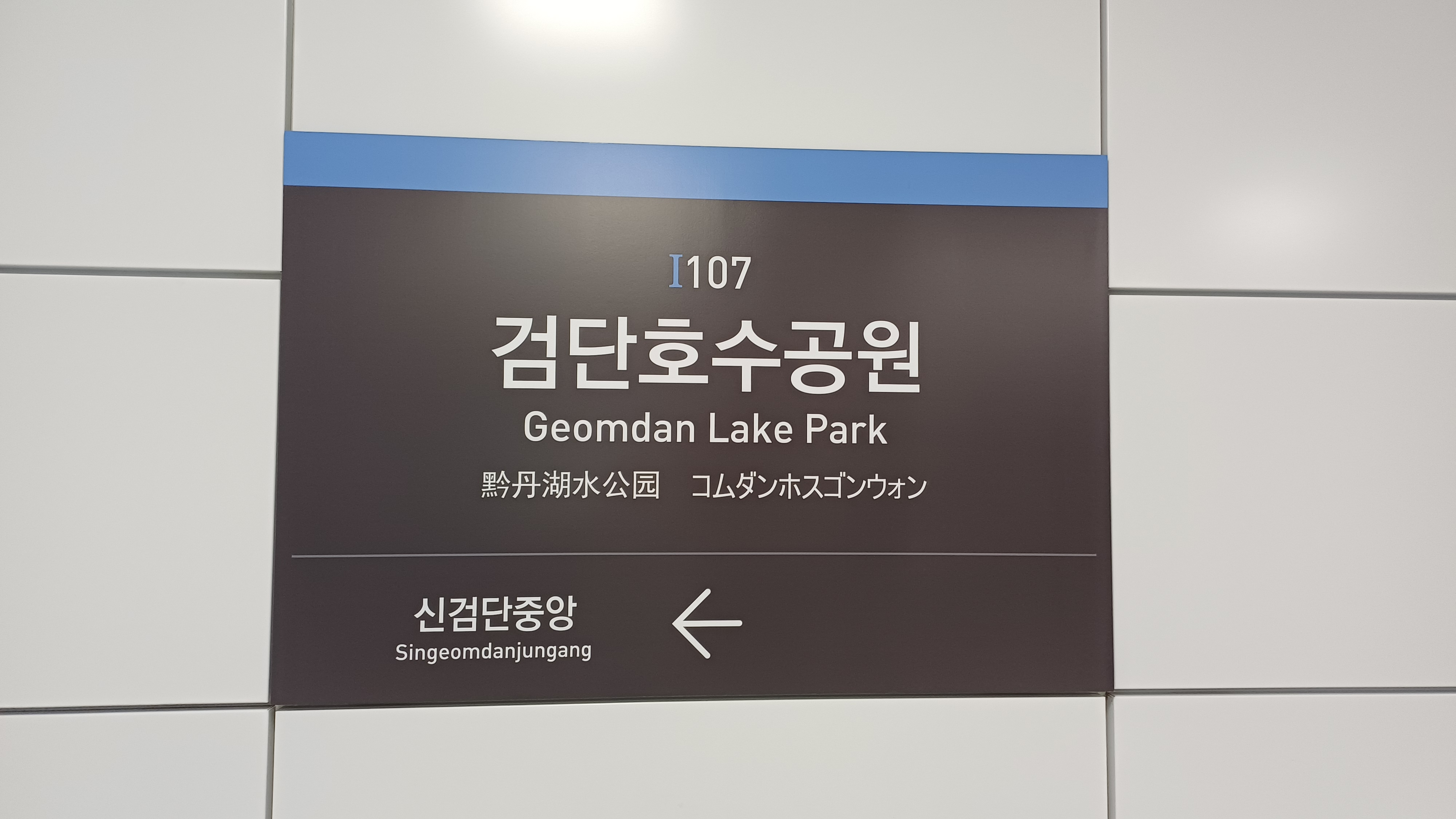
Station nameplate
