= Songdo Moonlight Festival Park station =

Metro station in Incheon, South Korea

I139 송도달빛축제공원 Songdo Moonlight Festival Park
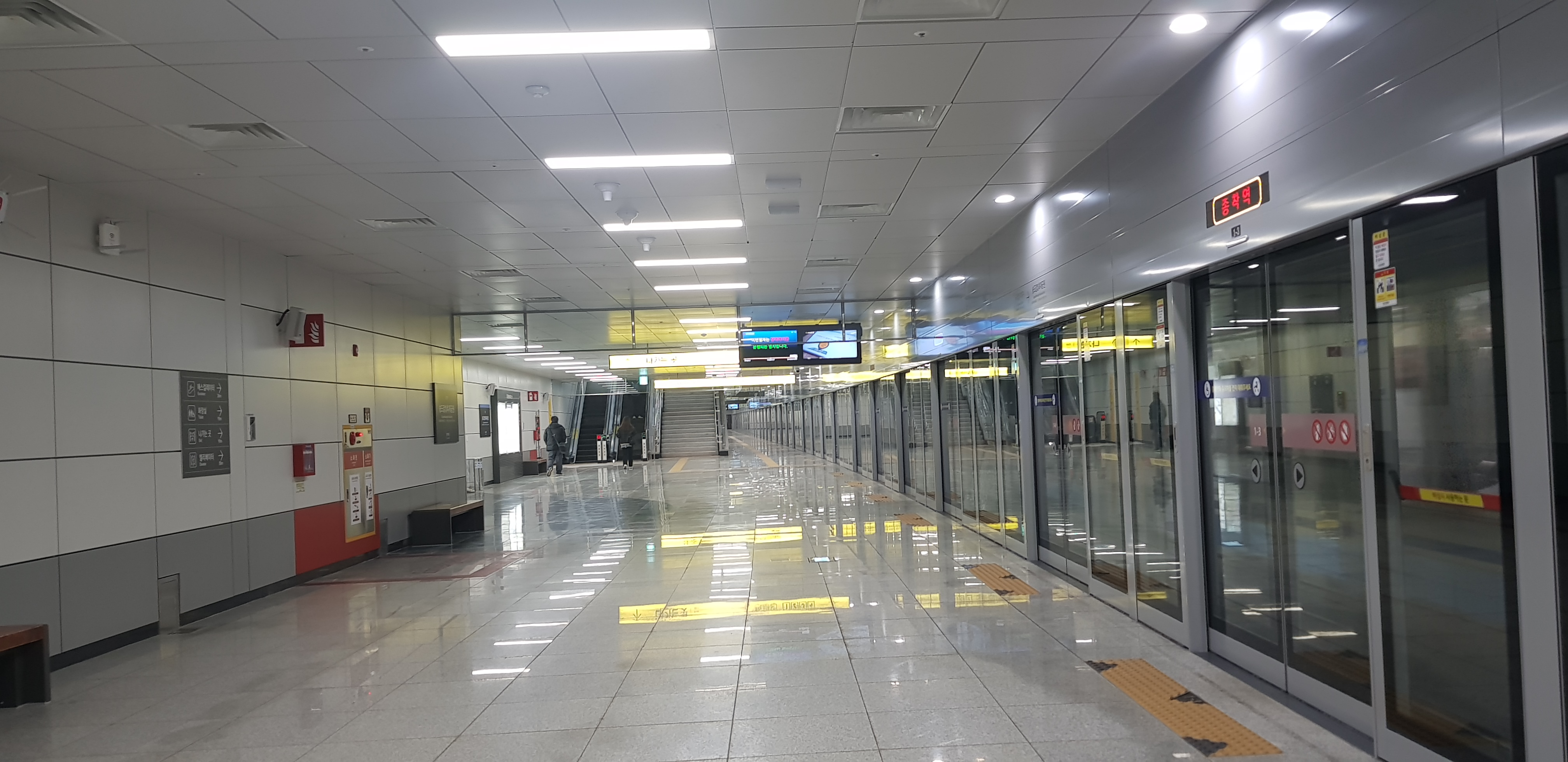

Korean name
- Hangul: 송도달빛축제공원역
- Hanja: 松島달빛祝祭公園驛
- Revised Romanization: Songdo dalbit chukje gongwon-yeok
- McCune–Reischauer: Songdo dalbit ch'ukche gongwŏn-yŏk

General information
- Location: 340 Songdo-dong, Yeonsu-gu, Incheon
- Operator: Incheon Transit Corporation
- Line: Incheon Line 1
- Platforms: 2
- Tracks: 2

Construction
- Structure type: Underground

History
- Opened: December 12, 2020

Services
| Preceding station | Incheon Subway | Following station |
|---|---|---|
| International Business District towards Geomdan Lake Park | Incheon Line 1 | Terminus |
Location

Songdo Moonlight Festival Park station (Korean: 송도달빛축제공원역) is a Line 1 subway station of the Incheon Subway in Yeonsu District, Incheon, South Korea. It opened on December 12, 2020 and became the terminal station at the same time. It is designed to allow trains to pass the section beyond the station at a speed of 65 km/h when the route is extended later.

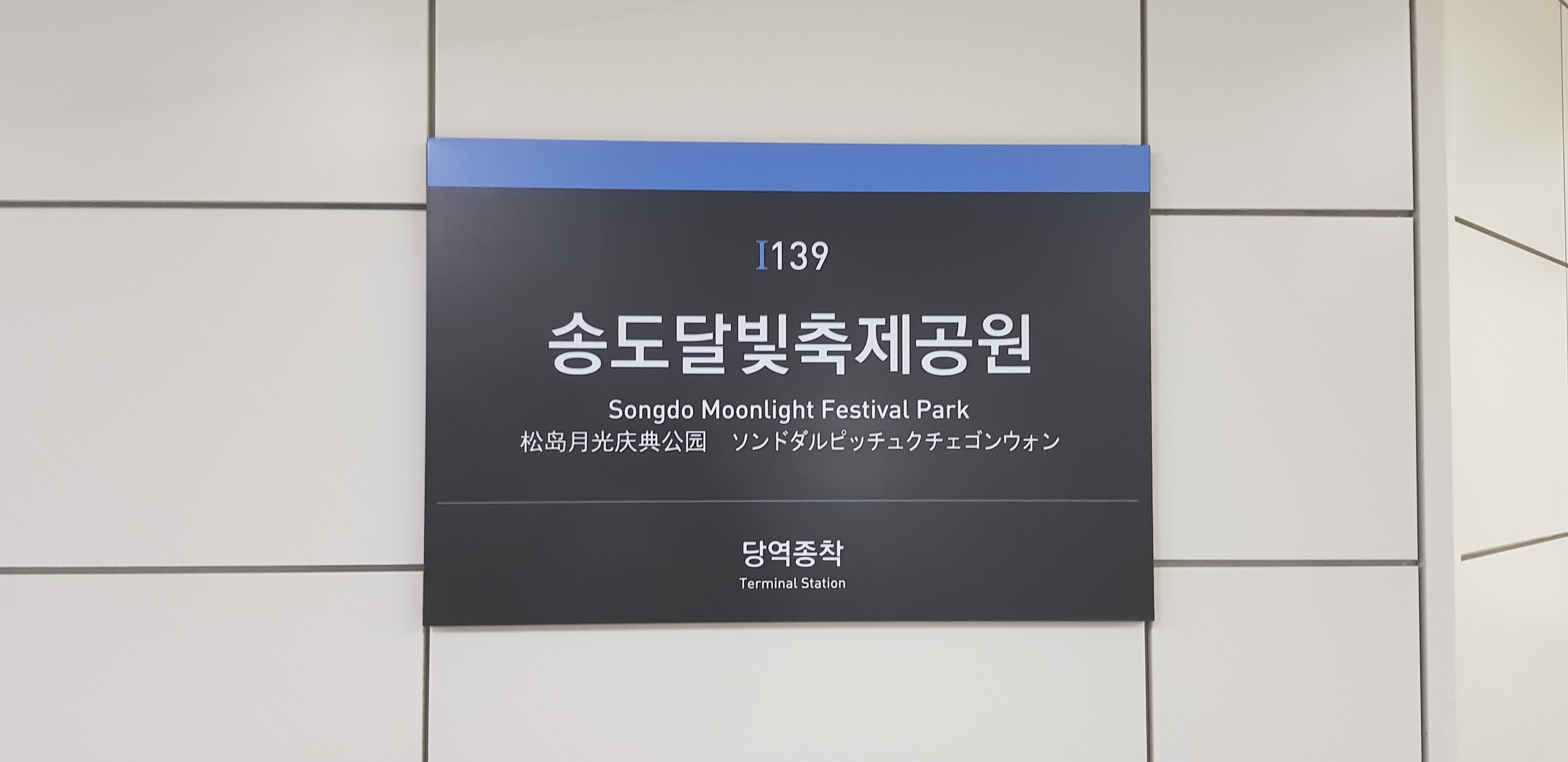
