= 2014 Asian Games opening ceremony =

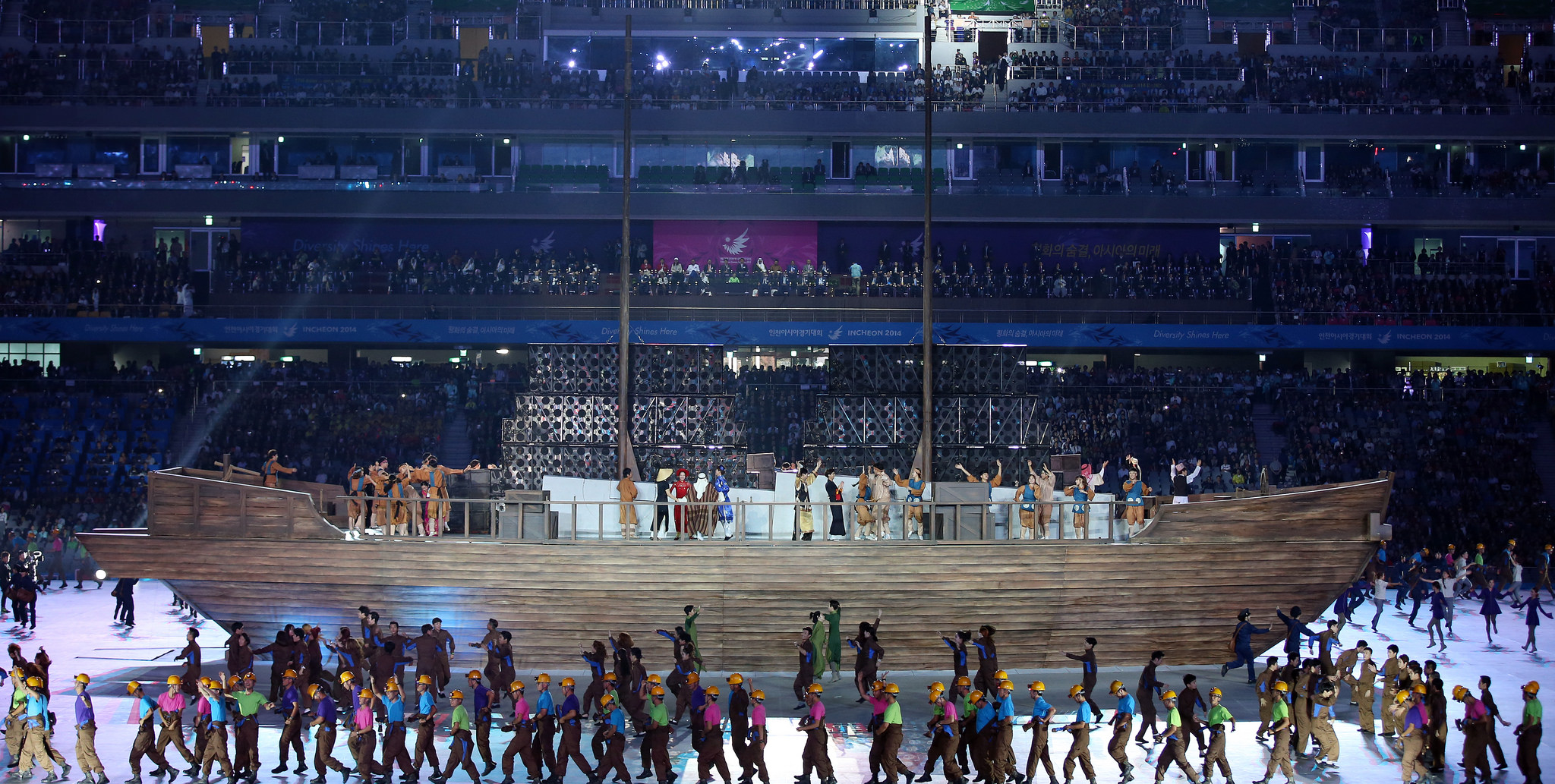
- Date: 19 September 2014
- Time: 19:18 – 22:20 KST (UTC+9)
- Location: Incheon, South Korea; 37.547418°N 126.665797°E
- Filmed by: IHB (KBS N Sports, MBC); IGBS; CCTV; IRIB; ABU

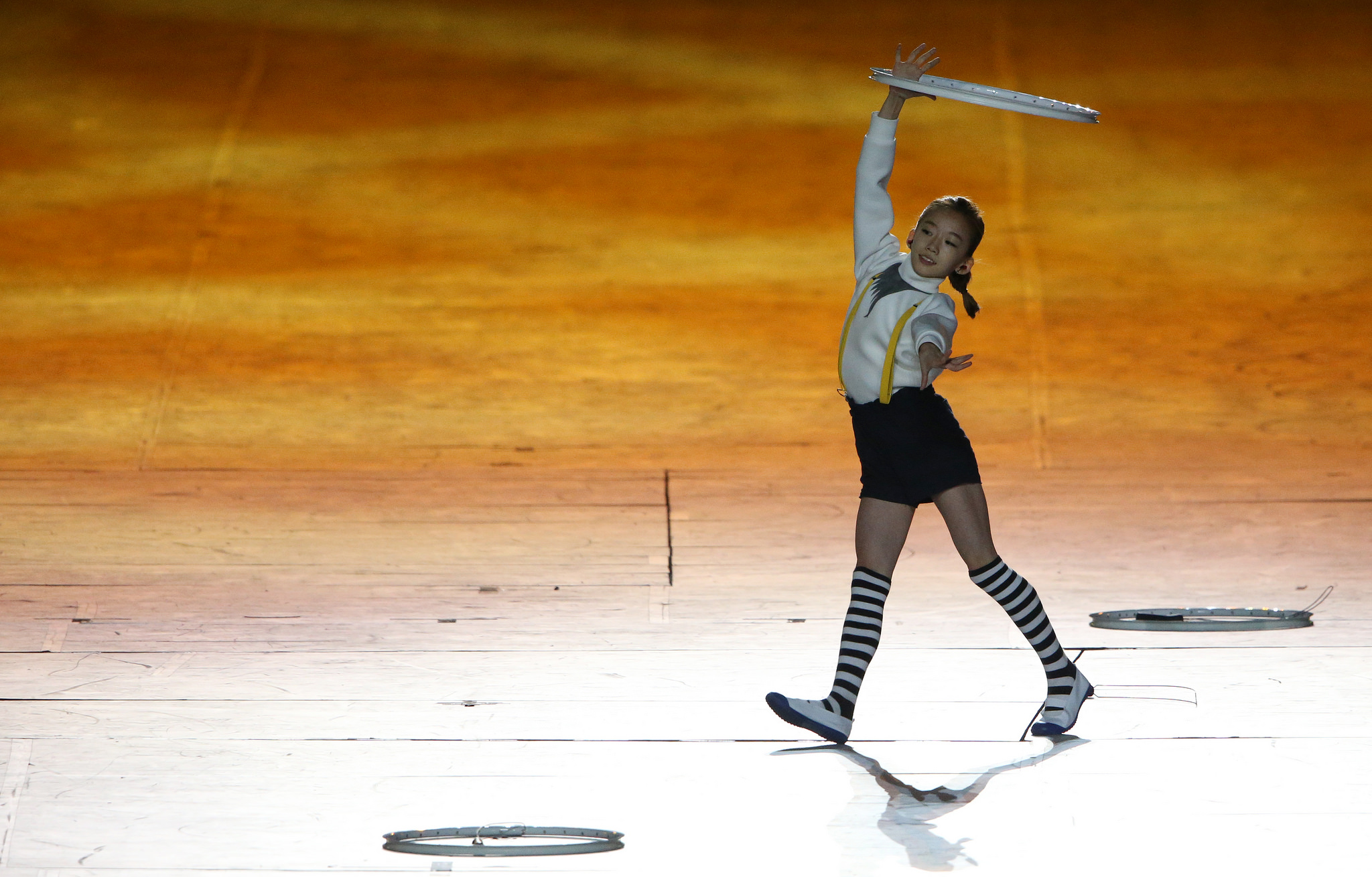
Young Korean gymnast, Kim Min acted at the ceremony.

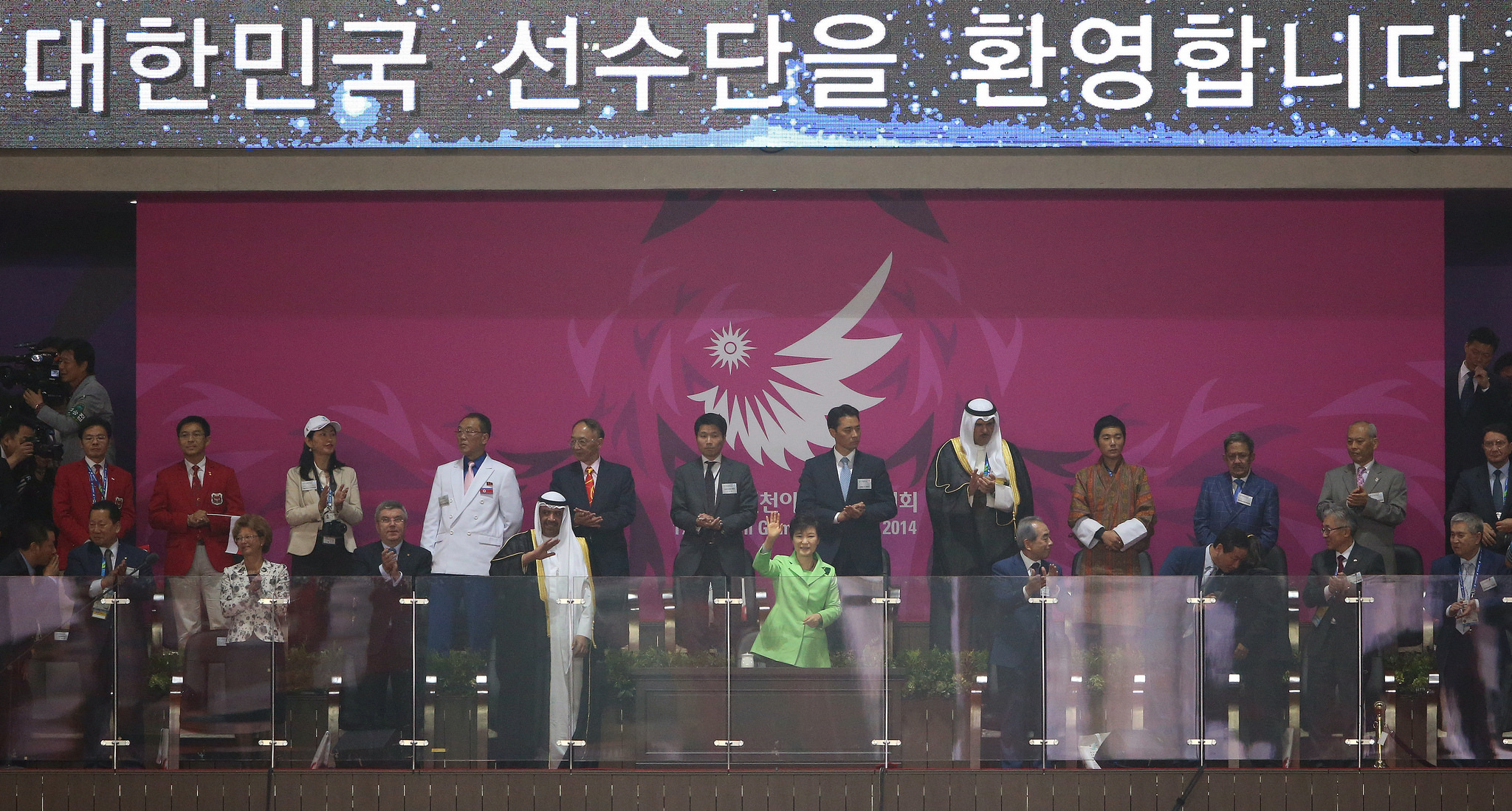
Official guests at the ceremony, South Korean President Park Geun-hye at the middle.

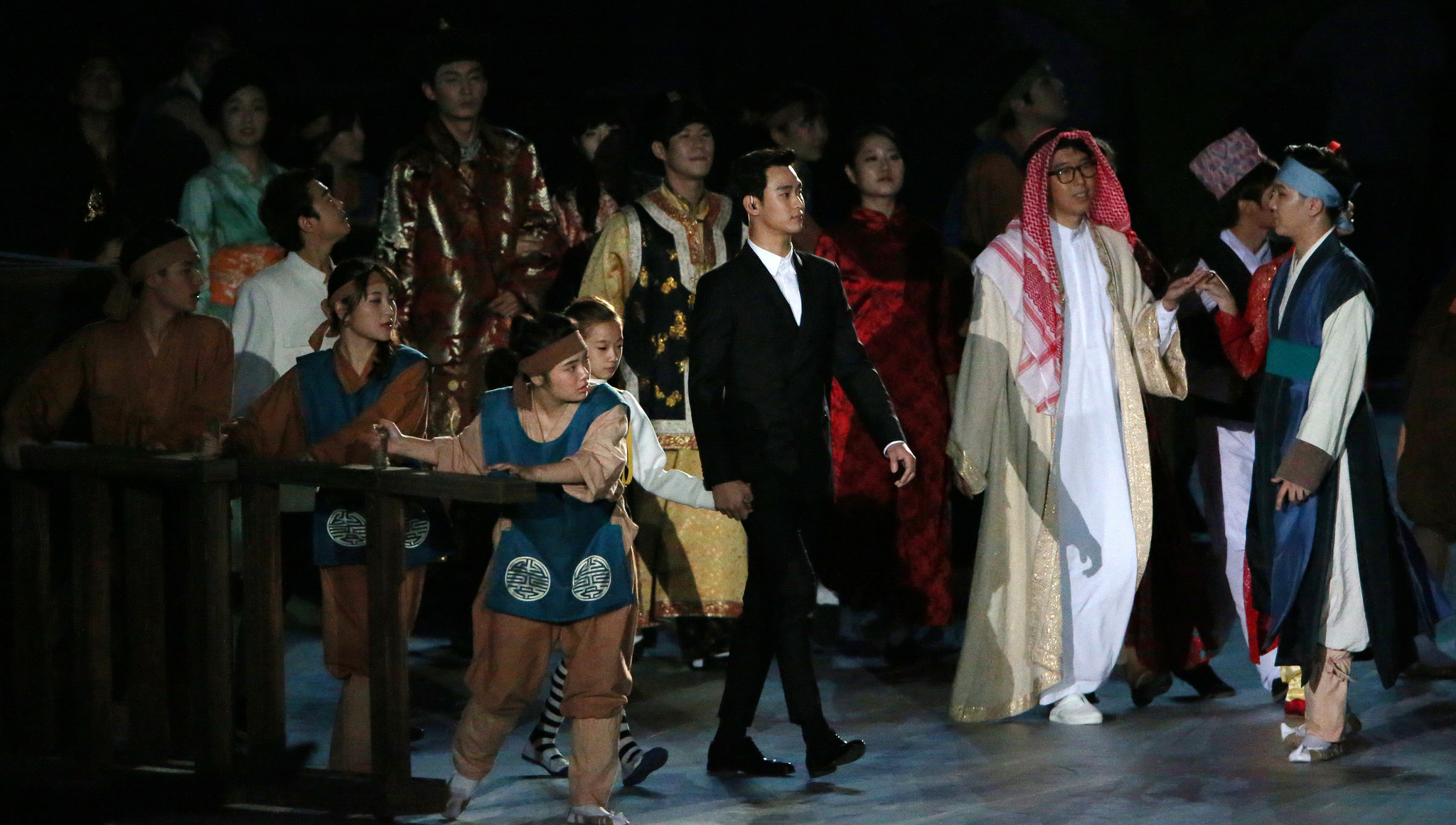
Asian countries presenting their traditional clothing and culture during the ceremony

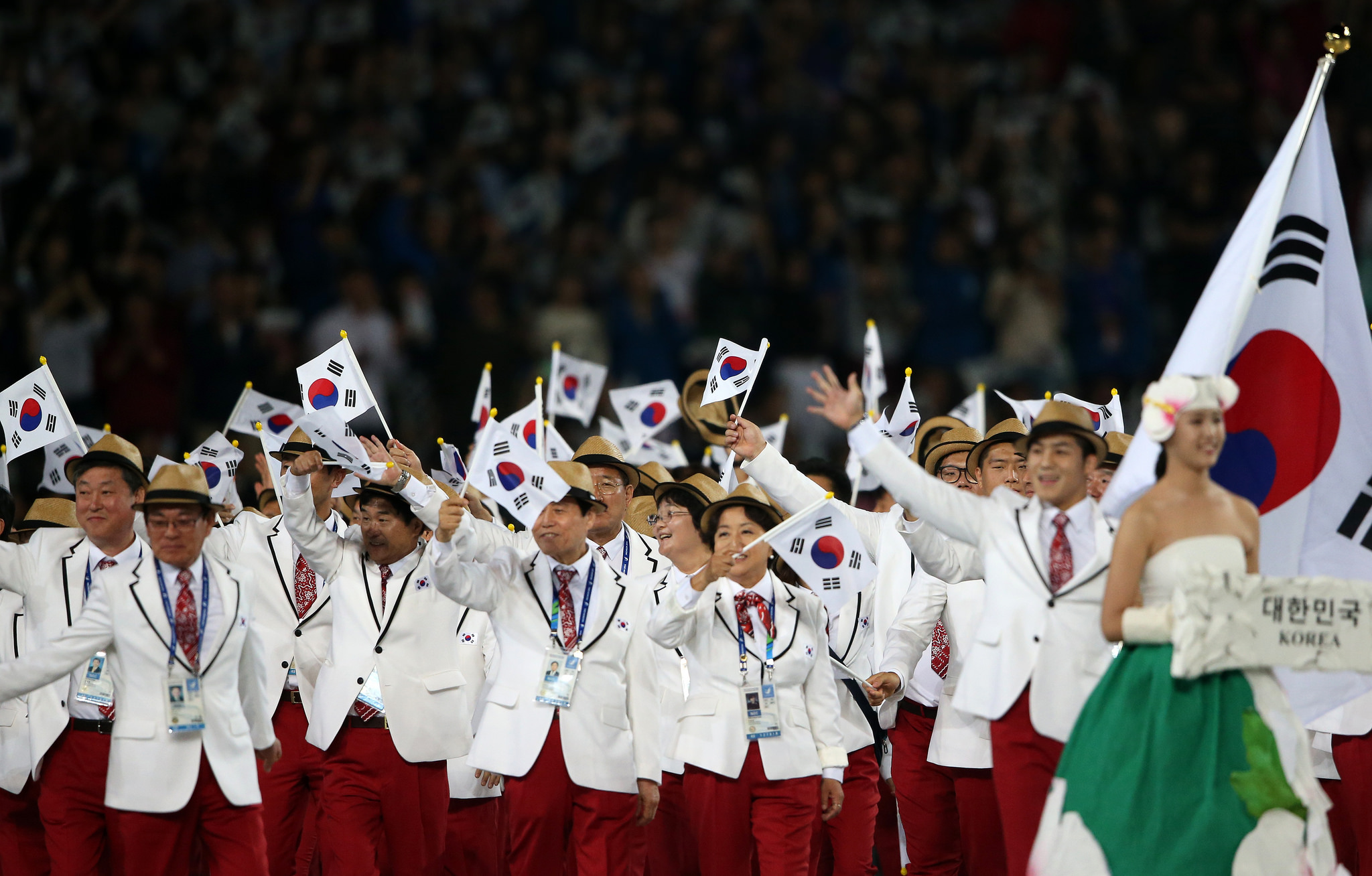
South Korea entering the stadium as host country.

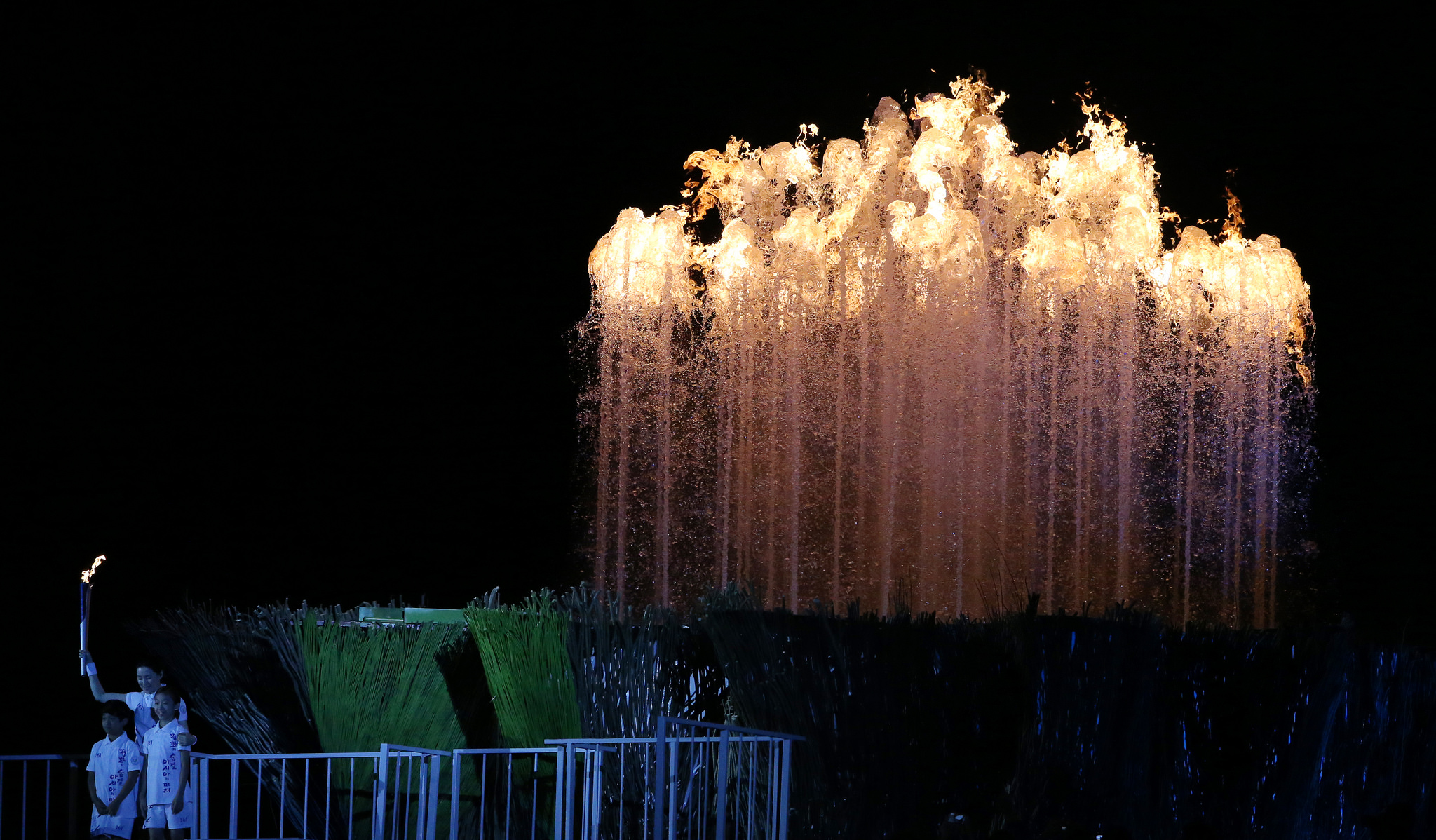
Flame burning at the top of Asiad Main Stadium.

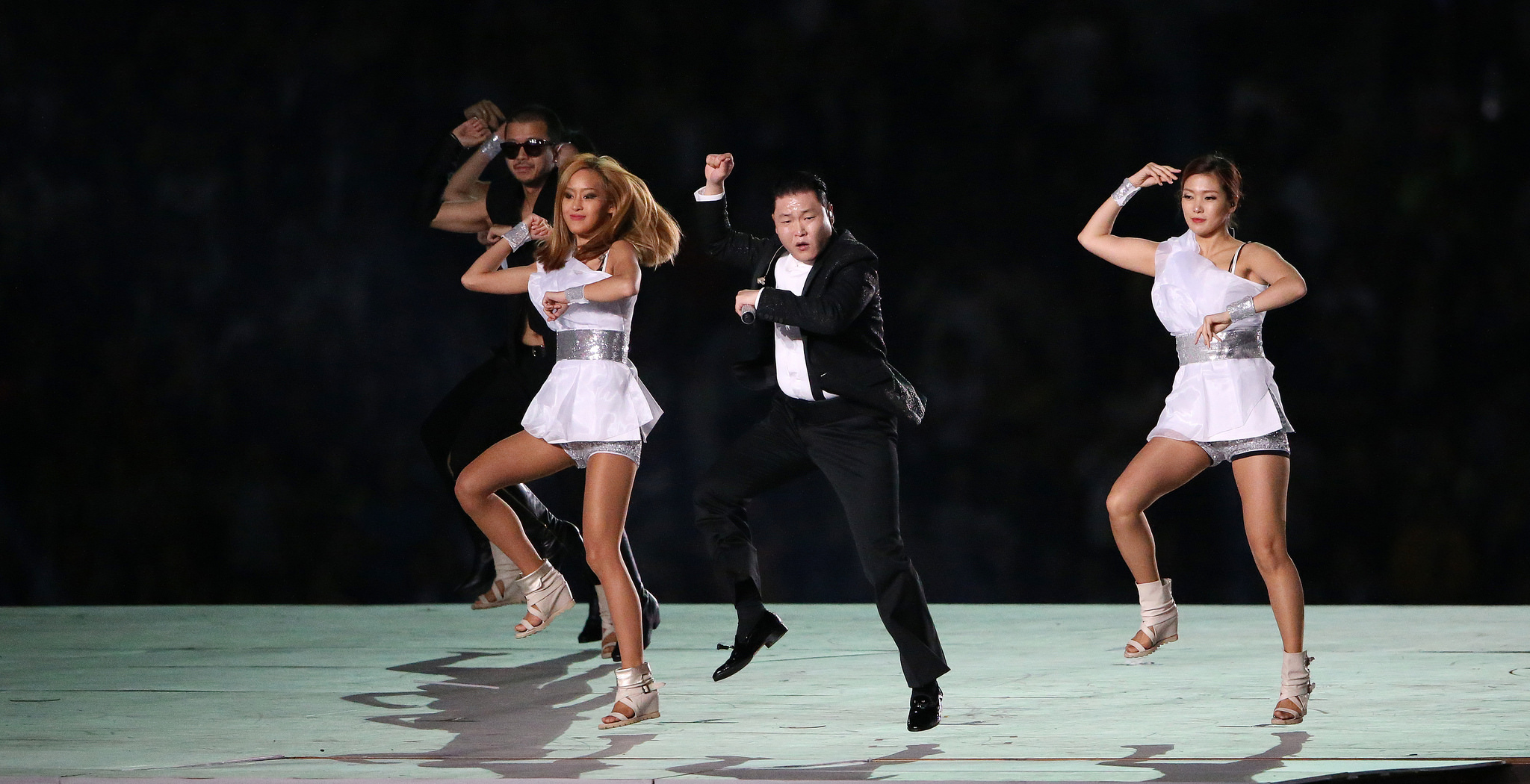
Psy performing Gangnam Style

The 2014 Asian Games opening ceremony was held on Friday, 19 September 2014 at the newly built Incheon Asiad Main Stadium. It began at 7:18 pm and ended at 10:20 pm Korea Standard Time (UTC+9). It was directed by two renowned Korean film directors: Im Kwon-taek who directed famous films such as Chunhyang (2000) and Sopyonje (1993) and Jang Jin who directed The Front Line (2011). Entertainer Kim Seong-ju and KBS emcee Yun Su-yeong were the hosts and the voice overs of the ceremony. The music of the ceremony's artistic performance was performed by Incheon Philharmonic Orchestra.

== Proceedings ==
=== Countdown ===
A countdown footage was shown on the stadium scoreboard with a Pop-up book featuring sceneries of the 45 participating nations of the Asian Games. Aerial fireworks released all over the stadium, forming the numbers "5, 4, 3, 2, 1" during the last five counts of the countdown and words: "Welcome" to marking the beginning of the ceremony. This was followed by a video of the mayor of Incheon, Yoo Jeong-bok introducing his city to the audiences.

=== Prelude ===
The ceremony started with a few introductory performances. The first one, featuring a little girl named Kim Min rolling a hoop across the main stadium to actor Jang Dong-Gun who in turn gave the hoop back to her, in an act that remembered the 1988 Summer Olympics opening ceremonies, the “Hoop Boy and Girls” performances. Kim is a young rhythmic gymnast attending Incheon Cheongil Primary School who hoped to represent Korea in the 2020 Summer Olympics. She was later joined by 44 other hoop-rolling children from various schools to represent the 45 participating nations of the games as well as the population of the Asian continent of 4.5 billion. In the second one, a few women dancers in traditional costume gathered at the center of the stage to form Cheongsachorong, a traditional Korean lantern to mark the arrival of notable guests including Park Geun-hye, then the President of South Korea. The third performance featured soprano Sumi Jo who sang "The Song of the Asiad," dedicated by poet Ko Un, along with Incheon Metropolitan Citizens Choir, a choir consisting of 919 residents of the host city symbolising the event's opening date. The performance was composed by Kim Youngdong, a representative composer for traditional music of Korea. At the end of the performance, Sumi Jo sang the Korean traditional folk song Arirang with 10-vocalist choir. Before the start of the main performance, a video of the 2014 Asian Games torch relay was played with British band Coldplay's single, Viva la Vida as background music.

=== Main event ===
The cultural performance covered four sections that tells the story about Asia, which were "Asia a long time ago", "Asia, connected through sea routes", "Asia becoming family and friends", and "One Asia the future we meet today". South Korean actors Jang Dong-gun and main cast of My Love from the Star, Kim Soo-hyun led the stories, with Jang narrating the first story and Kim appearing through a video during the second stage. Section one "Asia a long time ago" tells about the beginning of Asia, which was built upon one continuous land and people live peacefully as a part of nature together with other living things such as trees, animals, plants and flowers. After sometime, the continent is being separated alongside its people and natural beings. Section two "Asia, connected through sea routes" started with a footage about Girl on a Ship, Sim Cheong a devoted daughter in a fairy tale who sacrificed herself by jumping into the sea to become a sacrifice to sea-god and rescue her blind father. This was follow by a second footage, featuring the hoop girl, Kim earlier aboard the ship with Kim Soo-hyun and travel to all parts of Asia to meet the different people around the continent and take them together to visit Incheon. Five musical artists Ock Joo-hyun, Michael K. Lee, Cha Ji-yeon, Yang Joon-Mo and Jung Sung-hwa performing "We meet again" while the second footage was playing. In section three "Asia becoming family and friends", Prince Biryu, a founder of an ancient nation in the port city of Incheon thousands of years ago and Sim Cheong meet together in modern Incheon and witness the scenery and infrastructure of the city such as mail services, telephone services, rail transport system, airport, bridges, buildings, Incheon Asiad sports complex and seaport. During section four "One Asia the future we meet today", Ahn Sook-sun, Prince Biryu, Sim Cheong and the people of Incheon welcome home the ship that arrive to Incheon carrying Kim Min, Kim-Soo Hyun and the different people from all parts of Asia. The Sail of the ship was raised to represent hope for new future, united and modern Asia and Asia as one.

After the cultural performance, eight people brought the national flag into the stadium. They are Um Hong-Gil: renowned Korean mountaineer, and the first person in Asia to climb all of the 16 highest Himalayan peaks; Seok Haekyun, heroic captain of Aden Bay; Lee Bongju, the Boston men's marathon winner in 2001; actor Hyun-bin, an honorary ambassador of Incheon 2014; ballerina Kang Sujin; Korean lawmaker Jasmine Lee, the first non-ethnic Assembly member; professional golfer Park Seri, the youngest golfer being inducted into the World Golf Hall of Fame on the LPGA Tour; and finally, Lim Chun-ae, the triple gold medal winning middle distance runner at the 1986 Asian Games in Seoul. The flag was raised by the military personnel to the South Korean national anthem.

The Parade of Nations was conducted in Korean alphabetical order, hence the order began with Nepal and ended with host South Korea. All 45 national delegations participated in the parade and each of them were led by an official wearing a dress decorated with their country's natural symbols. Then, Kim Young-soo, the games' organising committee chairman and Olympic Council of Asia chairman Sheikh Ahmad Al-Fahad Al-Sabah gave their respective speeches and President of South Korea, Park Geun-hye declared the games open.

Another eight people brought the Flag of the games' governing body Olympic Council of Asia into the stadium. They are Ha Hyungjoo, a golden medalist for Judo at the 1984 Summer Olympics; Yoon Kyungshin, a handball player, who participated in the Asian Games five times and won five golden medals; badminton star Park Joobong, who is listed in Guinness World Record with 72 victories in international Championships; Yeo Hongchulpp, a golden medalist for gymnastics in the 1998 Asian Games; Baek Okja, a golden medalist in the shot put at the 1970 Asian Games; Hyeon Jeonghwa, who garnered a Grand Slam of international table-tennis Championships; Shin Junghee, the first Korean female to become international judge, a chair for athletes in Korean Olympic Committee; and Jang Miran, the first golden medalist for South Korea in weightlifting. The flag was raised by the military personnel to the short version of the Olympic Council of Asia Hymn. Archer Oh Jinhyek and fencer Nam Hyunhee took the athletes' oath, while judges, representing the sports of hockey and rhythmic gymnastics Kim Honglae and Suh Heajung took the judges' oath.

South Korean K-Pop artist group JYJ consists of Kim Jae-joong, Yoochun and Junsu, performing a medley of few of their singles including "Only One", the games' official theme song, "Flame" and their hit "Empty" during the torch relay section. The torch was relayed into the stadium by Lee Seungyeop, 'a Korean baseball hitter'; professional golfer, Park Inbee; speed skater Lee Kyouhyuk; basketball legend Park Chansook; and tennis pioneer, Lee Hyungtaik. South Korean actress, Lee Young Ae the main cast of Jewel in the Palace (or Dae Jang Geum) climb to the top of the stadium to light up the cauldron accompanied by young diving talent Kim Young-ho and young gymnast Kim Joo-won and aerial fireworks were released all over the stadium to mark the start of the games. The ceremony concludes with Psy performing a funky remake of "Champion," one of his early favourites singles, alongside Chinese pianist Lang Lang and global hit song at the time, "Gangnam Style". (Since 24 November 2012, Gangnam Style's music video was the most-viewed YouTube video until it was overtaken by Wiz Khalifa's "See You Again" on 10 July 2017.)

== Parade of Nations ==
During the Parade of Nations, athletes and officials from each participating country paraded in the Stadium preceded by their flag. Each flag bearer had been chosen either by the nation's National Olympic Committee or by the athletes themselves.

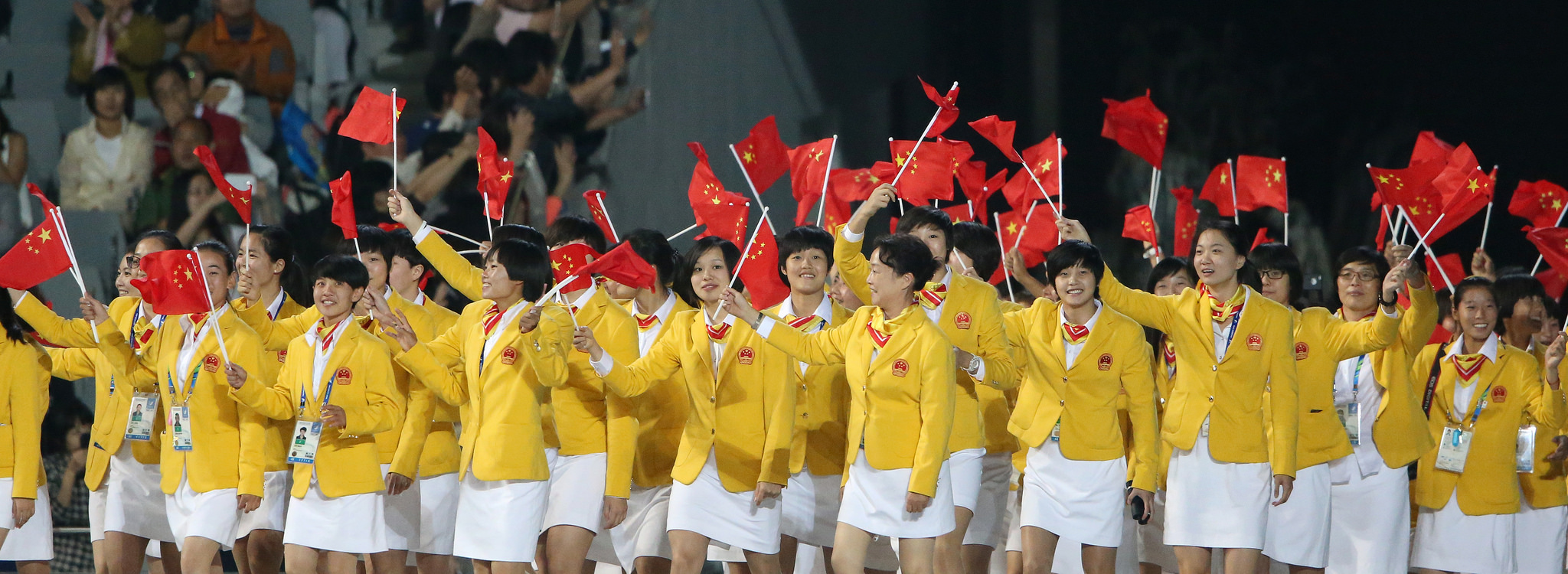
China entering the Incheon Asiad Main Stadium

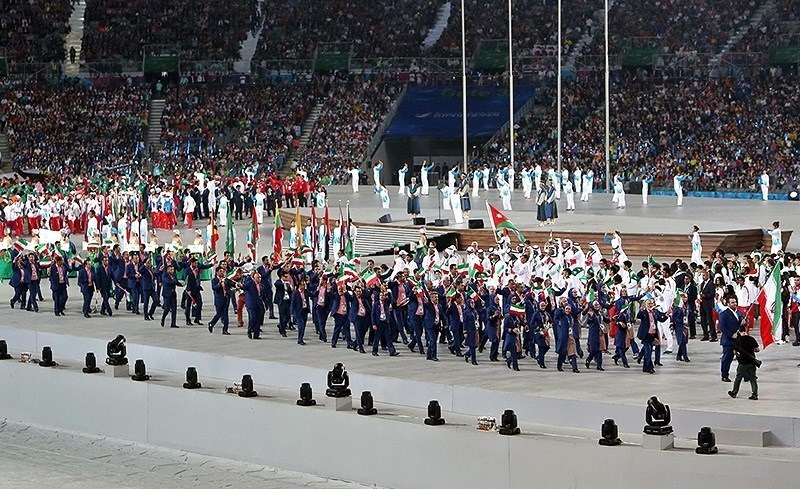
Iran entering the stadium with Behdad Salimi carrying the flag

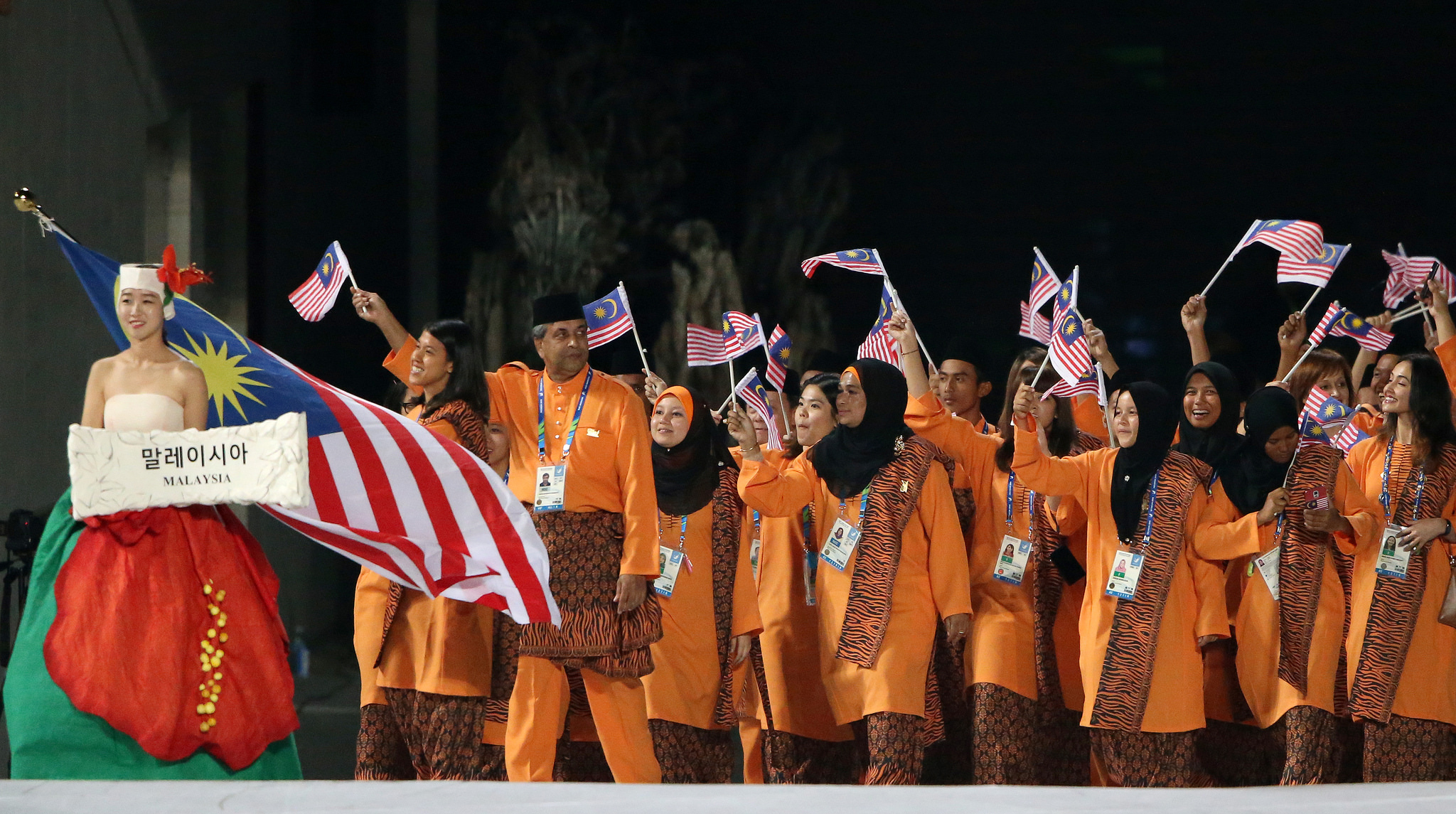
Malaysia athletes entering the stadium with squash legend, Nicol David carrying the Flag

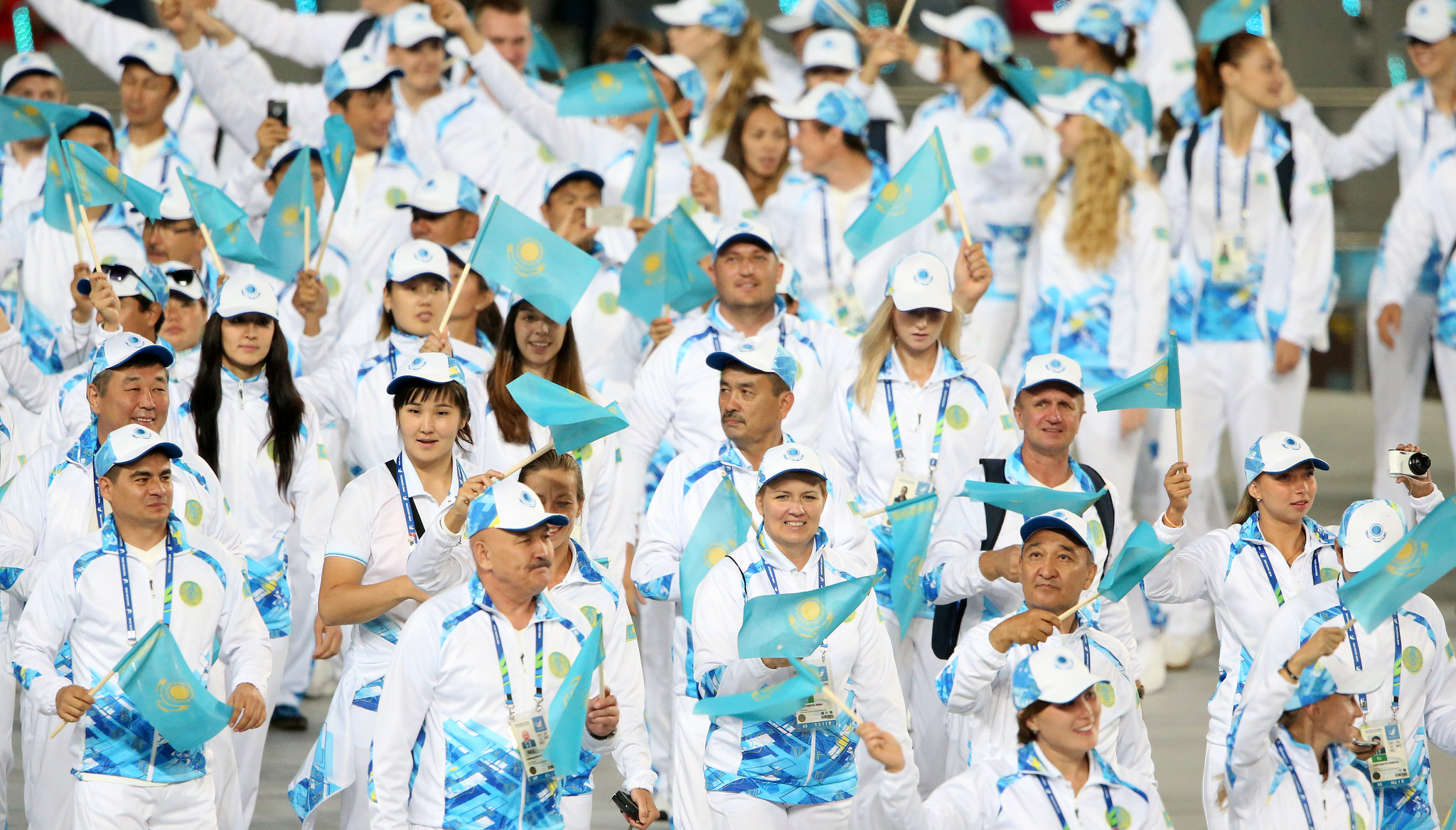
Kazakhstan entering the stadium as the 32nd country

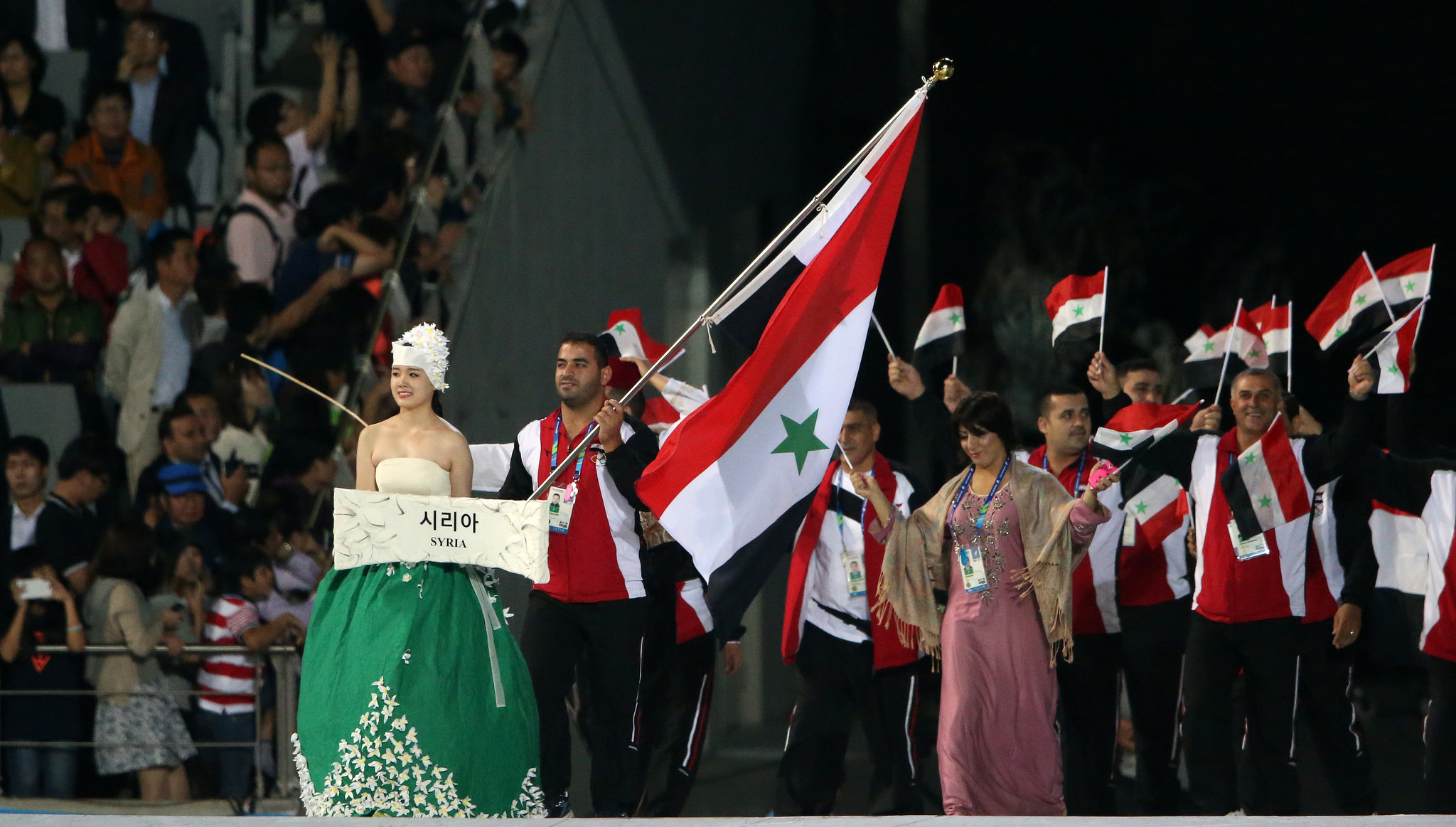
Syria with flag bearer Ahed Joughili, weightlifter and multiple medalist

Below is a list of national flagbearers during the ceremony. The nations entered in alphabetic order of their country names in Korean. Whilst most countries entered under their short names, a few entered under more formal or alternative names, mostly due to political disputes. The Republic of China (commonly known as Taiwan) entered with the compromised name and flag of "Chinese Taipei", using an English transliteration of the name (차이니스 타이페이 Chainiseu Taibei) to avoid translation issues.

The two Koreas entered separately, in contrast to the 2002 Asian Games (when host South Korea marched together with North Korea last). A few minor discrepancies also occurred:

- North Korea entered as the abbreviation "DPR Korea" in English and the full name 조선민주주의인민공화국 Joseon Minjujuui Inmin Gonghwaguk in Korean. Unusually, the English announcer directly called out the abbreviation "DPR Korea" upon North Korea's entrance. (North Korea usually abbreviates its official English team name in the Asian Games, but the announcer calls it out in full.)
- South Korea entered as the short name "Korea" in English and the full name 대한민국 Daehan Minguk in Korean, but the English announcer called out the full name "Republic of Korea".

Order	Nation	Korean	Roman transliteration	Flag bearer	Sport
1	Nepal (NEP)	네팔	Nepal	Sneh Rajya Laxmi Rana	Shooting
2	Timor-Leste (TLS) (Timor-Leste)	동티모르	Dongtimoreu	Lurdes Fabiola	Taekwondo
3	Laos (LAO)	라오스	Raoseu	Phoxay Aphailath	Wushu
4	Lebanon (LIB)	레바논	Rebanon	Elias Nacif	Judo
5	Macau (MAC)	마카오, 차이나	Makao, Chaina	Chao Man Hou	Swimming
6	Malaysia (MAS)	말레이시아	Malleisia	Nicol David	Squash
7	Maldives (MDV)	몰디브	Moldibeu	Ismail Sajid	Volleyball
8	Mongolia (MGL)	몽골	Monggol	Gantugs Jantsan	Archery
9	Myanmar (MYA)	미얀마	Miyanma	Nay Lin Aung	Volleyball
10	Bahrain (BRN)	바레인	Barein	Ali Husain Ali	Handball
11	Bangladesh (BAN)	방글라데시	Banggeulladesi	Abdullah Hel Baki	Shooting
12	Vietnam (VIE)	베트남	Beteunam	Hoàng Quý Phước	Swimming
13	Bhutan (BHU)	부탄	Butan	Kinley Tshering	Archery
14	Brunei (BRU) (Brunei Darussalam)	브루나이	Beurunai	Muhammad Fidaly Sanif	Karate
15	Saudi Arabia (KSA)	사우디아라비아	Saudiarabia	Sultan Al-Hebshi	Athletics
16	Sri Lanka (SRI)	스리랑카	Seurirangka	Chinthana Vidanage	Weightlifting
17	Syria (SYR)	시리아	Siria	Ahed Joughili	Weightlifting
18	Singapore (SIN)	싱가포르	Singgaporeu	Gary Yeo	Athletics
19	United Arab Emirates (UAE)	아랍에미리트	Arabemiriteu	Juma Al-Maktoum	Shooting
20	Afghanistan (AFG)	아프가니스탄	Apeuganiseutan	Mahmood Haidari	Taekwondo
21	Yemen (YEM)	예멘	Yemen	Yaser Ba-Matraf	Taekwondo
22	Oman (OMA)	오만	Oman	Hatem Al-Hamhami	Football
23	Jordan (JOR)	요르단	Yoreudan	Sam Daghles	Basketball
24	Uzbekistan (UZB)	우즈베키스탄	Ujeubekiseutan	Rishod Sobirov	Judo
25	Iraq (IRQ)	이라크	Irakeu	Younis Mahmoud	Football
26	Iran (IRI)	이란	Iran	Behdad Salimi	Weightlifting
27	India (IND)	인도	Indo	Sardara Singh	Field hockey
28	Indonesia (INA)	인도네시아	Indonesia	I Gede Siman Sudartawa	Swimming
29	Japan (JPN)	일본	Ilbon	Kaori Kawanaka	Archery
30	North Korea (PRK) (DPR Korea)	조선민주주의인민공화국	Joseon Minjujuui Inmin Gonghwaguk	Sok Yong-bom	Boxing
31	China (CHN)	중국	Jungguk	Lei Sheng	Fencing
32	Kazakhstan (KAZ)	카자흐스탄	Kajaheuseutan	Adilbek Niyazymbetov	Boxing
33	Qatar (QAT)	카타르	Katareu	Mubarak Ali Al Muraikhi	Bowling
34	Cambodia (CAM)	캄보디아	Kambodia	Sorn Seavmey	Taekwondo
35	Kuwait (KUW)	쿠웨이트	Kuweiteu	Fehaid Al-Deehani	Shooting
36	Kyrgyzstan (KGZ)	키르기스스탄	Kireugiseuseutan	Bolot Toktogonov	Judo
37	Chinese Taipei (TPE)	차이니스 타이베이	Chainiseu Taibei	Chen Chien-chen	Volleyball
38	Tajikistan (TJK)	타지키스탄	Tajikiseutan	Mavzuna Chorieva	Boxing
39	Thailand (THA)	태국	Taeguk	Kawin Thamsatchanan	Football
40	Turkmenistan (TKM)	투르크메니스탄	Tureukeumeniseutan	Gylychdurdyyev Gurbanmuhammet	Volleyball
41	Pakistan (PAK)	파키스탄	Pakiseutan	Muhammad Imran	Field hockey
42	Palestine (PLE)	팔레스타인	Palleseutain	Ahmad Maher	Football
43	Philippines (PHI)	필리핀	Pillipin	Geylord Coveta	Sailing
44	Hong Kong (HKG)	홍콩, 차이나	Hong Kong, Chaina	Cheng Kwok Fai	Sailing
45	South Korea (KOR) (Korea)	대한민국	Daehan Minguk	Kim Hyeon-woo	Wrestling

== Notable guests ==
=== Koreans ===
- Park Geun-hye, President of South Korea
- Yoo Jeong-bok, Mayor of Incheon
- Lee Myung-bak, former South Korean president and his wife Kim Yoon-ok

=== Foreign dignitaries ===
- Thomas Bach, president of International Olympic Committee
- Ahmed Al-Fahad Al-Ahmed Al-Sabah, president of Olympic Council of Asia
- Yōichi Masuzoe, Governor of Tokyo
