= G20 2010 =

G20 2010 may refer to:

- 2010 G20 Toronto summit, the G20 summit on 26–27 June 2010 in Toronto, Canada
- 2010 G20 Seoul summit, the G20 summit on 11–12 November 2010 in Seoul, South Korea
