= Gyeong-in National University of Education station =

Metro station in Incheon, South Korea

I115 경인교대입구 (상록호텔조리직업전문학교) Gyeong-in Nat'l Univ. of Education (Sangnok Hotel Culinary Arts College)
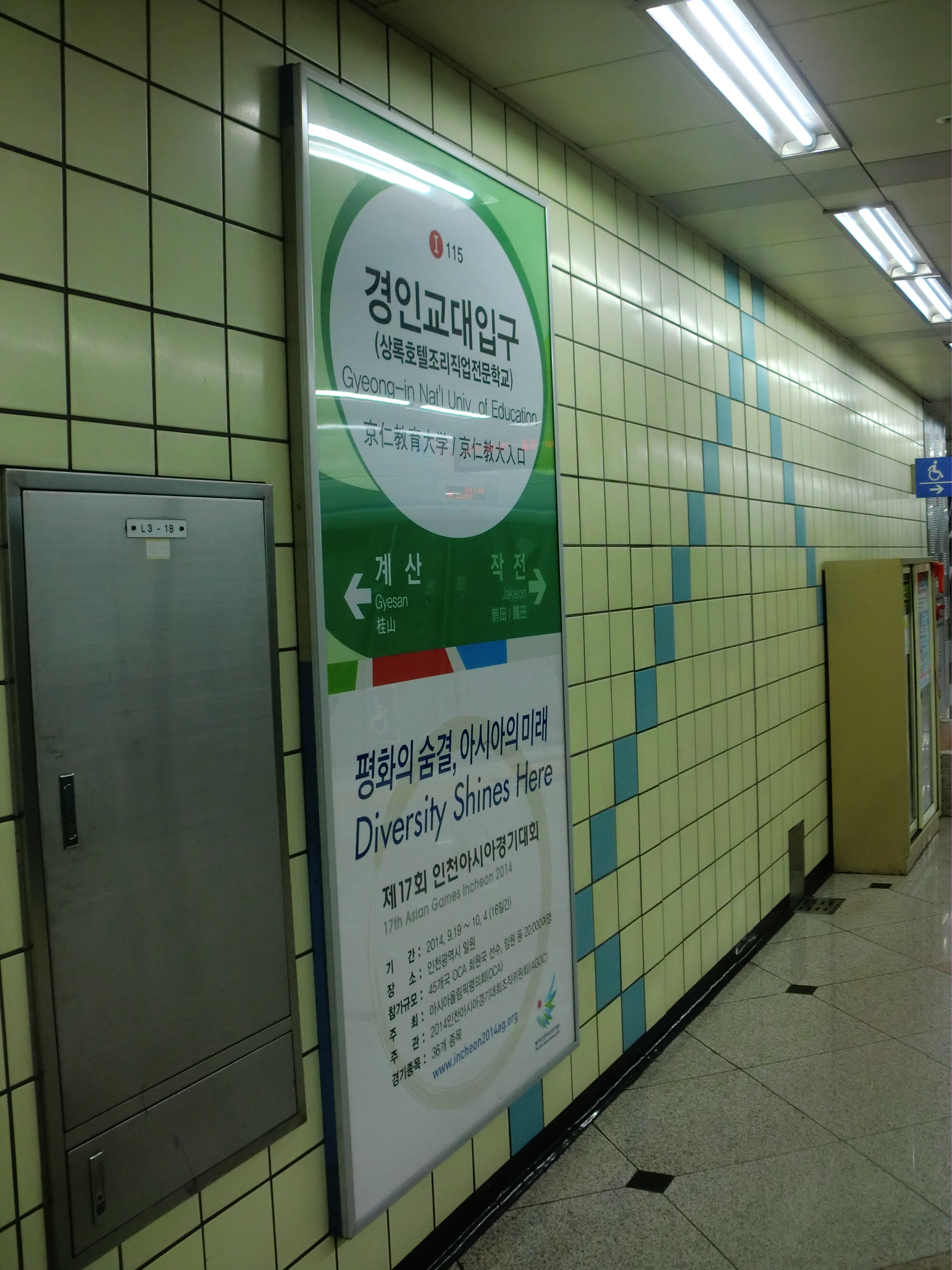

Korean name
- Hangul: 경인교대입구역
- Hanja: 京仁敎大入口驛
- Revised Romanization: Gyeongin-gyodae-ipgu-yeok
- McCune–Reischauer: Kyŏngin-gyodae-ipku-yŏk

General information
- Location: 168 Gyeyangdaero Jiha, Gyeyang-gu, Incheon
- Coordinates: 37°32′18.97″N 126°43′21.63″E
- Operator: Incheon Transit Corporation
- Line: Incheon Line 1
- Platforms: 2
- Tracks: 2

Construction
- Structure type: Underground

Other information
- Station code: I115

History
- Opened: October 6, 1999; 27 years ago

Services
Preceding station	Incheon Subway	Following station
Gyesan towards Geomdan Lake Park	Incheon Line 1	Jakjeon towards Songdo Moonlight Festival Park
Location

Gyeong-in National University of Education Station is located at Gyeyang district of Incheon in South Korea. The station was opened in 1999 of which the name was Incheon National university of education station. In 2003, the term was changed following the alteration of university. The university changed its name into Gyeongin National University of Education.

== Station layout ==
G	Street Level
L1	Concourse	Faregates, Ticketing Machines, Station Control
L2; Platforms	Side platform, doors will open on the right
L2; Platforms	Westbound	← Incheon Line 1 toward Geomdan Lake Park (Gyesan)
L2; Platforms	Eastbound	→ Incheon Line 1 toward Songdo Moonlight Festival Park (Jakjeon) →
L2; Platforms	Side platform, doors will open on the right

== Exits ==
Exit No.	Image	Destinations
1		Bupyeong Elementary School; Gyesan Market
2		Gyesan post agency
3		Gyeyang District
4		Gyeongin National University of Education
5		Bupyeong Hyanggyo
6		BukIncheon Middle School

== Ridership ==
Station	Figure			
Station	2003	2004	2005	2006
Line 1 of Incheon subway	8113	7649	7203	7012
