= Imhak station =

Metro station in Incheon, South Korea

I113 임학 Imhak
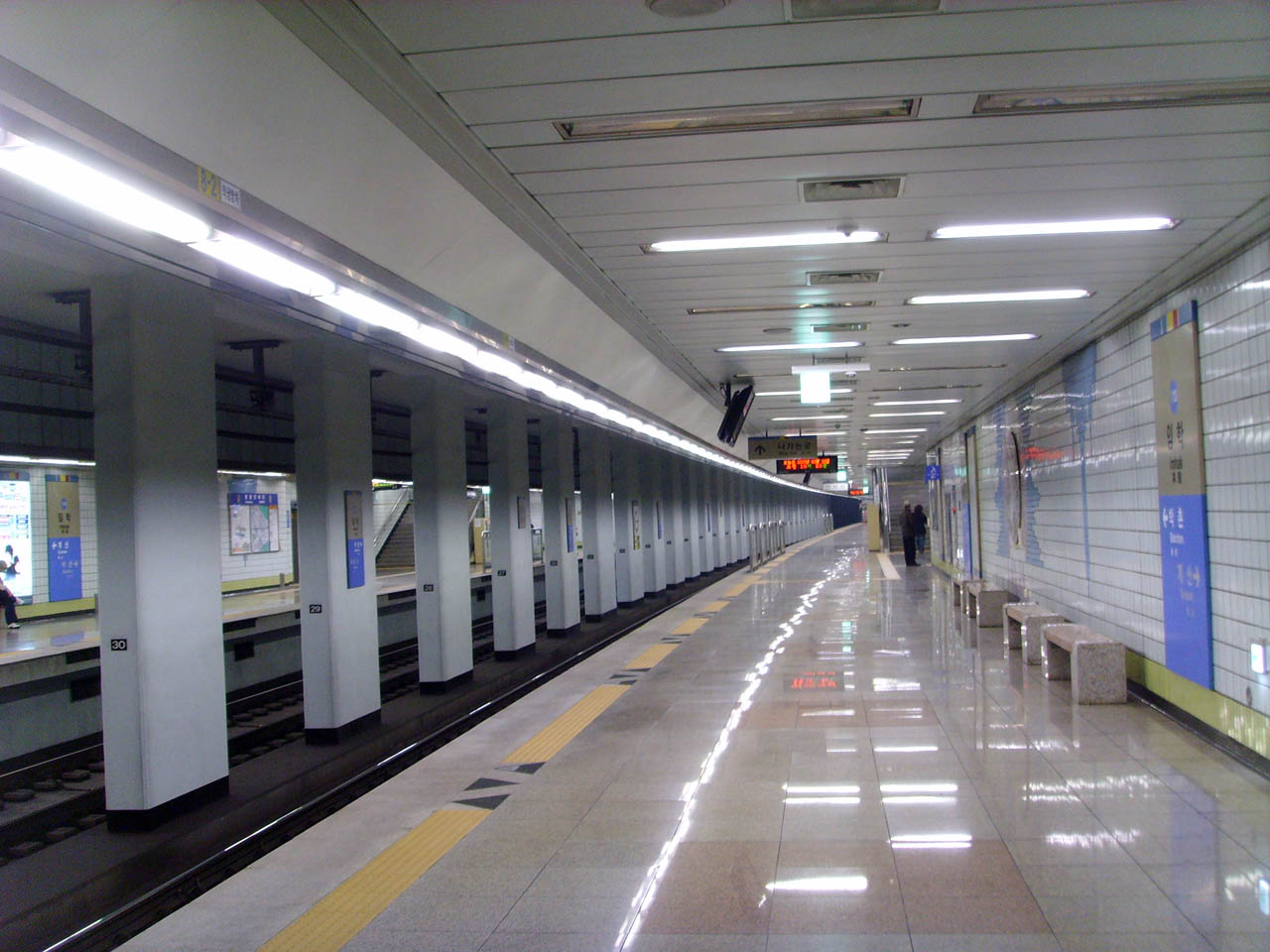
- Station platform before screen installation

Korean name
- Hangul: 임학역
- Hanja: 林鶴驛
- Revised Romanization: Imhangnyeok
- McCune–Reischauer: Imhangnyŏk

General information
- Location: 878 Jangjero Jiha, Gyeyang-gu, Incheon
- Coordinates: 37°32′42″N 126°44′19″E
- Operator: Incheon Transit Corporation
- Line: Incheon Line 1
- Platforms: 2
- Tracks: 2

Construction
- Structure type: Underground

Other information
- Station code: I113

History
- Opened: October 6, 1999; 27 years ago

Services
Preceding station	Incheon Subway	Following station
Bakchon towards Geomdan Lake Park	Incheon Line 1	Gyesan towards Songdo Moonlight Festival Park
Location

Imhak Station (Korean: 임학역; Hanja: 林鶴驛) is a subway station on Line 1 of the Incheon Subway in Gyeyang District, Incheon, South Korea.

== History ==
The station was opened on October 6, 1999, and in 2014, the screen door was installed.

== Station layout ==
G	Street Level
L1	Concourse	Faregates, Ticketing Machines, Station Control
L2; Platforms	Side platform, doors will open on the right
L2; Platforms	Westbound	← Incheon Line 1 toward Geomdan Lake Park (Bakchon)
L2; Platforms	Eastbound	→ Incheon Line 1 toward Songdo Moonlight Festival Park (Gyesan) →
L2; Platforms	Side platform, doors will open on the right

== Exits ==
Exit No.	Image	Destinations
1		Imhak middle school Byeongbang elementary school
2		Gyeyang high school Gilju elementary school Grand Mart; Gyeyang police station Gyesan girls' high school Gyeyang post office Jakjeon elementary school
3		Kookmin Bank; Gyeyang public library
4		Saemaeul Geumgo
