= Gyesan station =

Metro station in Incheon, South Korea

I114 계산 (경인여자대학교) Gyesan (Kyung-in Women's College)
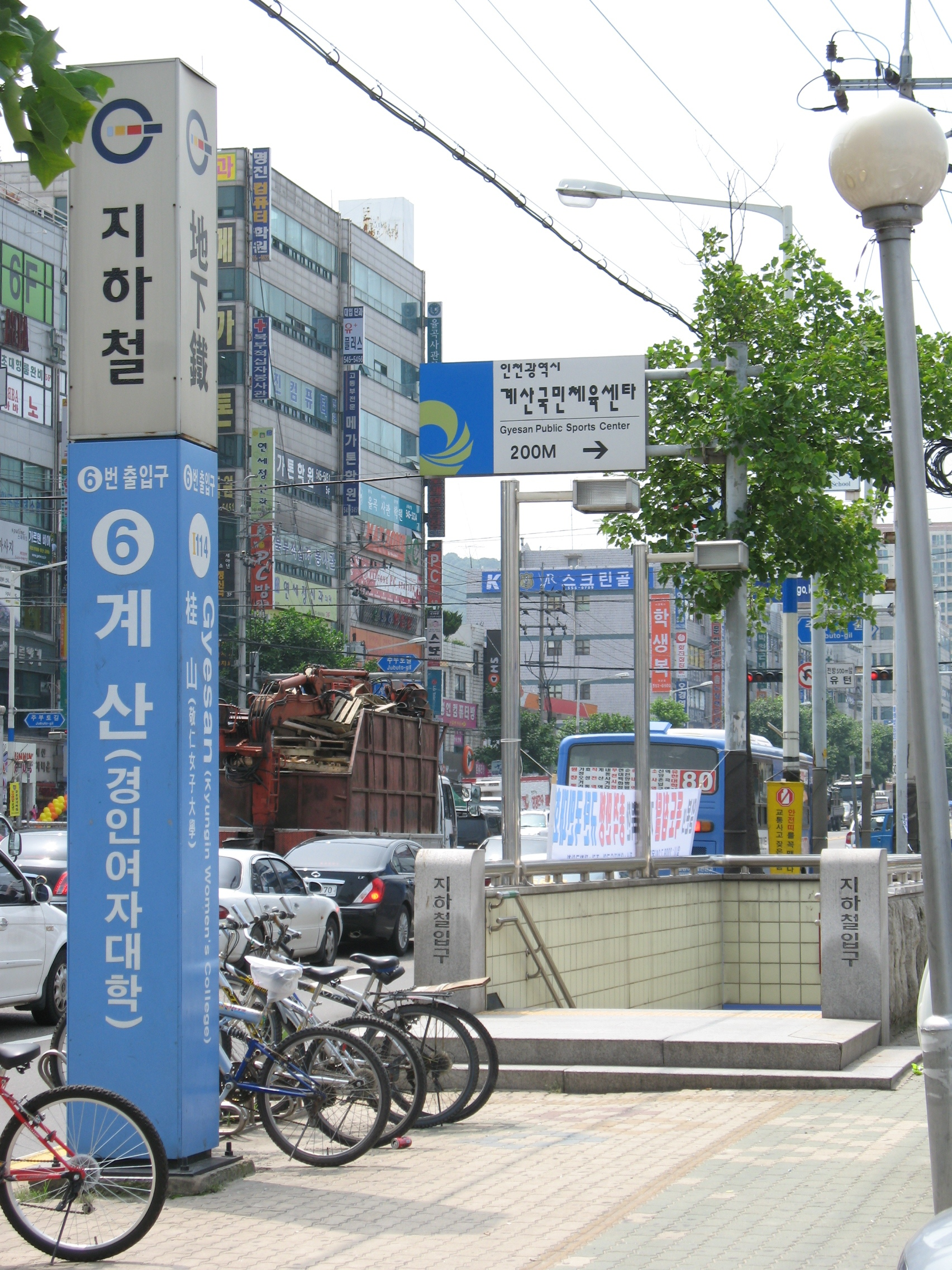
- Gyesan Station Exit No. 6

Korean name
- Hangul: 계산역
- Hanja: 桂山驛
- Revised Romanization: Gyesannyeok
- McCune–Reischauer: Kyesannyŏk

General information
- Other names: Kyungin Women's College
- Location: 1094 Gyeongmyeongdaero; Jiha, Gyeyang-gu, Incheon
- Coordinates: 37°32′35.99″N 126°43′42.68″E
- Operator: Incheon Transit Corporation
- Line: Incheon Line 1
- Platforms: 2
- Tracks: 2

Construction
- Structure type: Underground
- Parking: Yes
- Cycle facilities: Yes

Other information
- Station code: I114

History
- Opened: October 6, 1999; 27 years ago

Services
Preceding station	Incheon Subway	Following station
Imhak towards Geomdan Lake Park	Incheon Line 1	Gyeong-in National University of Education towards Songdo Moonlight Festival Park
Location

Gyesan station (Korean: 계산역; Hanja: 桂山驛) is a subway station on Line 1 of the Incheon Subway located at Gyesan 1,2 dong, Gyeyang District, Incheon. The station is nearby Kyung-in Women's College.

== Structure ==
Gyesan Station is a 2 platform, 2 track underground station. As the ticket gates are separated according to platform, there is no way of crossing over without checking your ticket.

=== Station layout ===
G	Street Level
L1	Concourse	Faregates, Ticketing Machines, Station Control
L2; Platforms	Side platform, doors will open on the right
L2; Platforms	Westbound	← Incheon Line 1 toward Geomdan Lake Park (Imhak)
L2; Platforms	Eastbound	→ Incheon Line 1 toward Songdo Moonlight Festival Park (Gyeong-in Nat'l Univ. of Education) →
L2; Platforms	Side platform, doors will open on the right

== Exits ==
Exit No.	Image	Destinations
1		Annam elementary school Annam middle school Gyeyang-gu office Gyeyang police office Gyesan girls' middle school Gyeyang post office Grand Mart; Homever
2		Samsung Plaza; Daewoo Motors; Gyesan technical high school Gyeyang fire station Gyesan girls' high school
3		Bupyeong elementary school
4		Gyesan post office Gyeongin women's college Gyesan elementary school
5		Gyesan-2-dong
6		Geunlin park Gyesan high school Ansan elementary school Gyeyang public library
