= Bakchon station =

Metro station in Incheon, South Korea

I112 박촌 Bakchon
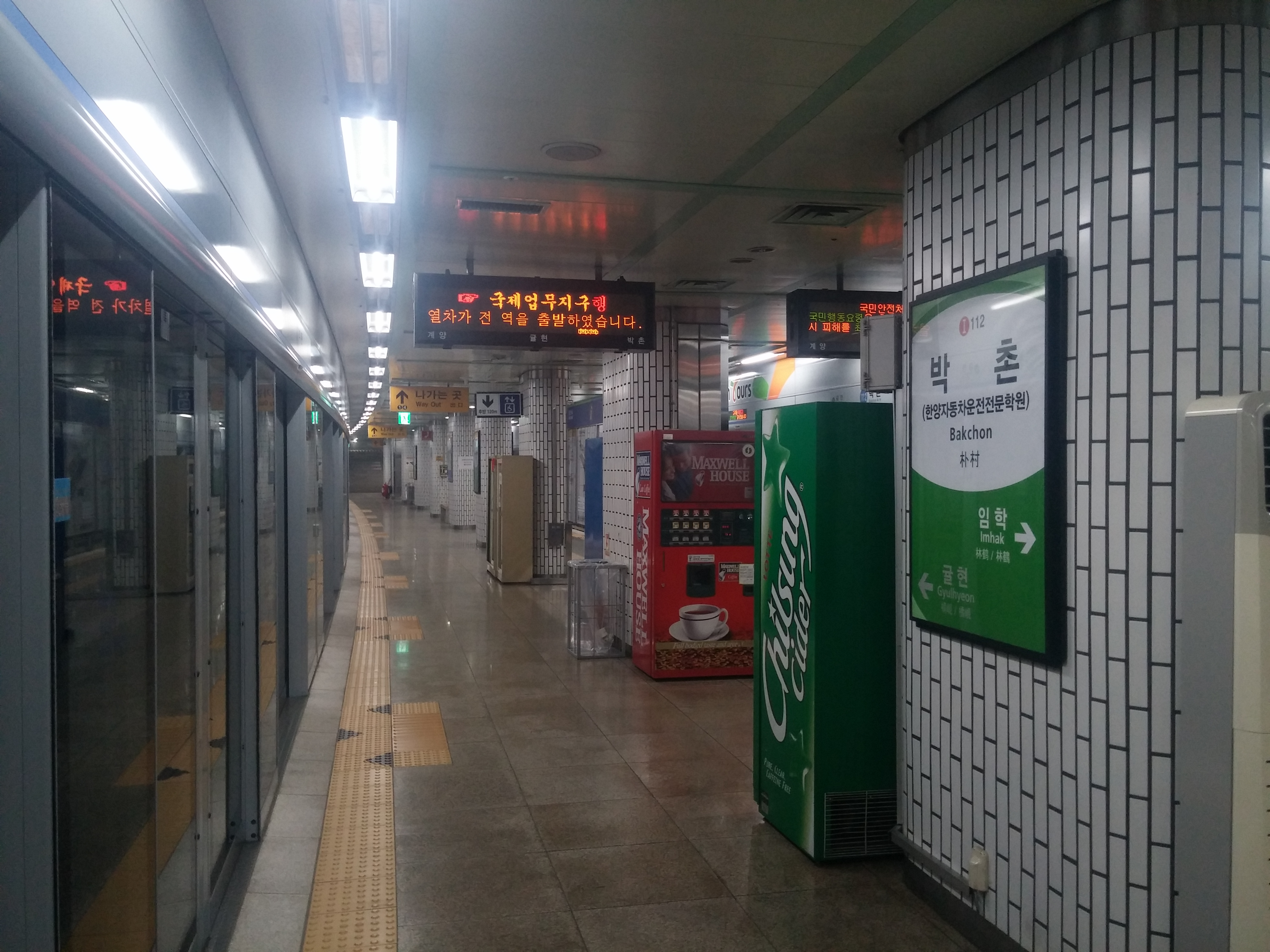

Korean name
- Hangul: 박촌역
- Hanja: 朴村驛
- Revised Romanization: Bakchonnyeok
- McCune–Reischauer: Pakch'onnyŏk

General information
- Location: 994 Jangjero Jiha, Gyeyang-gu, Incheon
- Coordinates: 37°33′15.18″N 126°44′43.25″E
- Operator: Incheon Transit Corporation
- Line: Incheon Line 1
- Platforms: 2
- Tracks: 3

Construction
- Structure type: Underground

Other information
- Station code: I112

History
- Opened: October 6, 1999; 26 years ago

Passengers
- 2017: 7,216

Services
Preceding station	Incheon Subway	Following station
Gyulhyeon towards Geomdan Lake Park	Incheon Line 1	Imhak towards Songdo Moonlight Festival Park
Location

Bakchon Station (Korean: 박촌역; Hanja: 朴村驛) is a subway station on Line 1 of the Incheon Subway in Gyeyang District, Incheon, South Korea

== Station layout ==
The platform has two island platforms and three tracks commonly referred to as “three-tracks, two-island”, and has a screen door installed. Under normal circumstances, only unloaded and commercial ships are used for business. Parks arriving and departing from and arriving at Barkchon also handle passengers at the top and bottom platforms respectively.

From the beginning of the opening, the mid-line was used to return and handle passengers on trains that repeatedly run between Bakchon and Dongmak. However, due to the abolition of the train, as of May 2019, it will be used in emergencies, such as vehicle replacement due to obstacles, as well as in trains leaving the vehicle base. The middle line toward Gyulhyeon is not connected to the mainline.

G	Street Level	Exits
L1	Concourse	Faregates, Ticketing Machines, Station Control
L2; Platforms	Westbound	← Incheon Line 1 toward Geomdan Lake Park (Gyulhyeon)
L2; Platforms	Island platform, doors will open on the right
L2; Platforms	Through tracks	← Not in regular service →
L2; Platforms	Island platform, doors will open on the right
L2; Platforms	Eastbound	→ Incheon Line 1 toward Songdo Moonlight Festival Park (Imhak) →

== Exits ==
Exit No.	Image	Destinations
1		Bakchon-dong, Dongyang-dong
2		Yeil high school Bangchook middle school Yangchon elementary school Yangchon middle school
3		Gyeyang Nonghyup
4		Soyang elementary school
