= Jakjeon station =

Metro station in Incheon, South Korea

I116 작전 (인천세종병원) Jakjeon (Incheon Sejong Hospital)
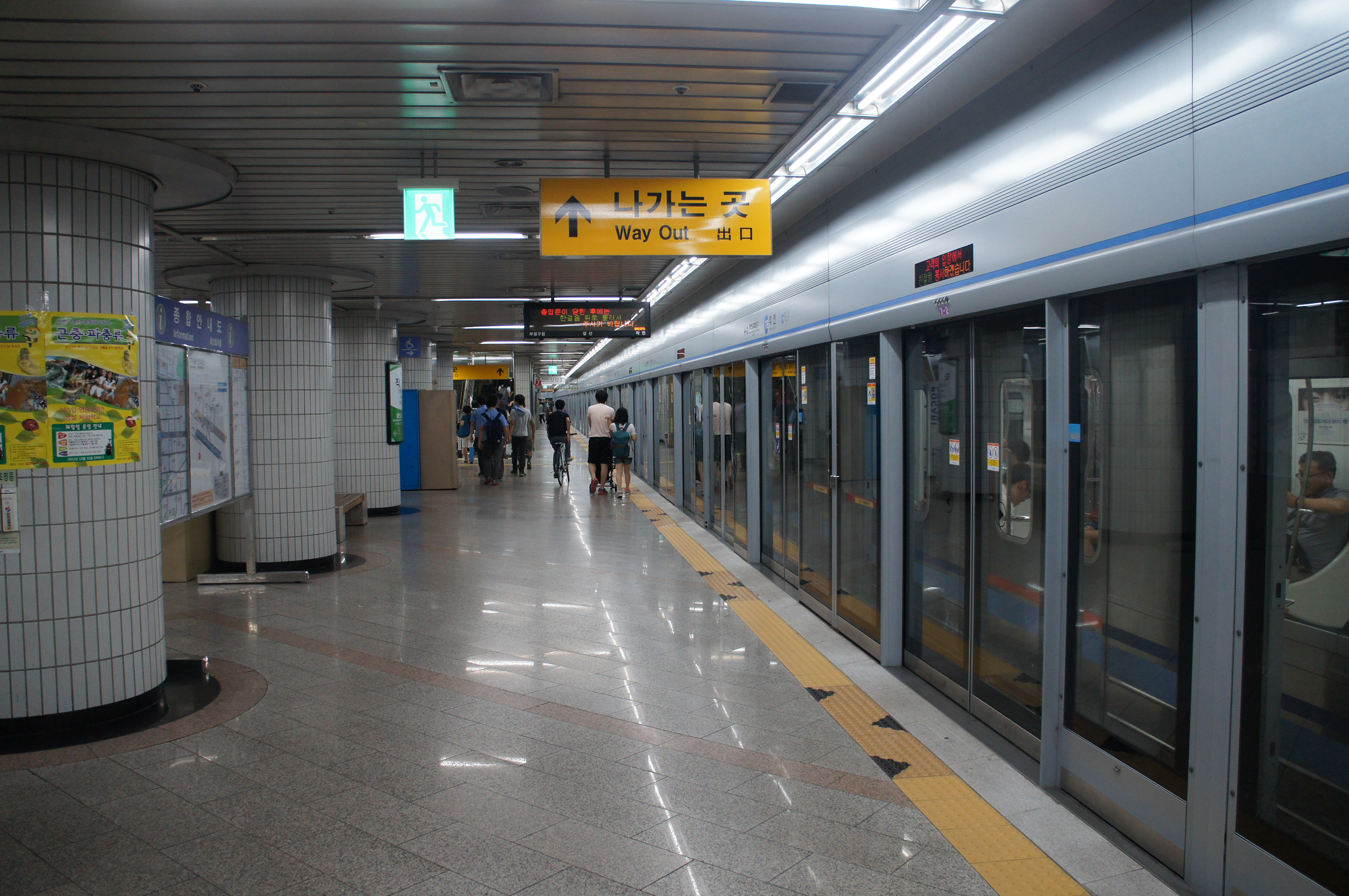

Korean name
- Hangul: 작전역
- Hanja: 鵲田驛
- Revised Romanization: Jakjeonnyeok
- McCune–Reischauer: Chakchŏnnyŏk

General information
- Other names: Hallym Hospital
- Location: 80 Gyeyangdaero Jiha, Gyeyang-gu, Incheon
- Coordinates: 37°31′49.20″N 126°43′21.27″E
- Operator: Incheon Transit Corporation
- Line: Incheon Line 1
- Platforms: 1
- Tracks: 2

Construction
- Structure type: Underground
- Cycle facilities: Yes

Other information
- Station code: I116

History
- Opened: October 6, 1999; 27 years ago

Services
Preceding station	Incheon Subway	Following station
Gyeong-in National University of Education towards Geomdan Lake Park	Incheon Line 1	Galsan towards Songdo Moonlight Festival Park
Location

Jakjeon Station (Korean: 작전역; Hanja: 鵲田驛) is a subway station on Line 1 of the Incheon Subway located at Jakjeon-dong, Gyeyang District, Incheon, South Korea.

== Overview ==
Jakjeon is a dense residential area with many apartment buildings.

== Passengers ==
Because of its characteristics, many people enter and leave during rush hours. Besides, it roles as a traffic node in the northern area of Bupyeong station with Gyeongin Expressway.

== Station layout ==
G	Street Level
L1	Concourse	Faregates, Ticketing Machines, Station Control
L2; Platforms	Side platform, doors will open on the right
L2; Platforms	Westbound	← Incheon Line 1 toward Geomdan Lake Park (Gyeong-in Nat'l Univ. of Education)
L2; Platforms	Eastbound	→ Incheon Line 1 toward Songdo Moonlight Festival Park (Galsan) →
L2; Platforms	Side platform, doors will open on the right

== Exits ==
Exit No.	Image	Destinations
1		Assembly of Gyeyang gu district Town office of Jakjeon 2 dong Woori Bank Corporation.
2		Town office of Jakjeon 1 dong Jakjeon Market; Jakjeon middle school Jakjeon high school Jakjeon girls' high school
3		National Health Insurance; Jakjeon post office
4		Buk Incheon Tax Office
5		Hyoseong elementary school Home Plus; Hi-mart
6		Gyeyang Shinhyup
7		Hyoseong Dong elementary school Hyoseong middle school
8		Saemaeul Geumgo
