= National University of Education station (disambiguation) =

National University of Education station is a station on Daegu Subway Line 1.

National University of Education station may also refer to:

- Seoul National University of Education station, on Seoul Subway Line 2 and Line 3
- Busan National University of Education station, on Busan Subway Line 1
- Gyeongin National University of Education station, on Incheon Subway Line 1
