= Gyulhyeon station =

Metro station in Incheon, South Korea

I111 귤현 Gyulhyeon
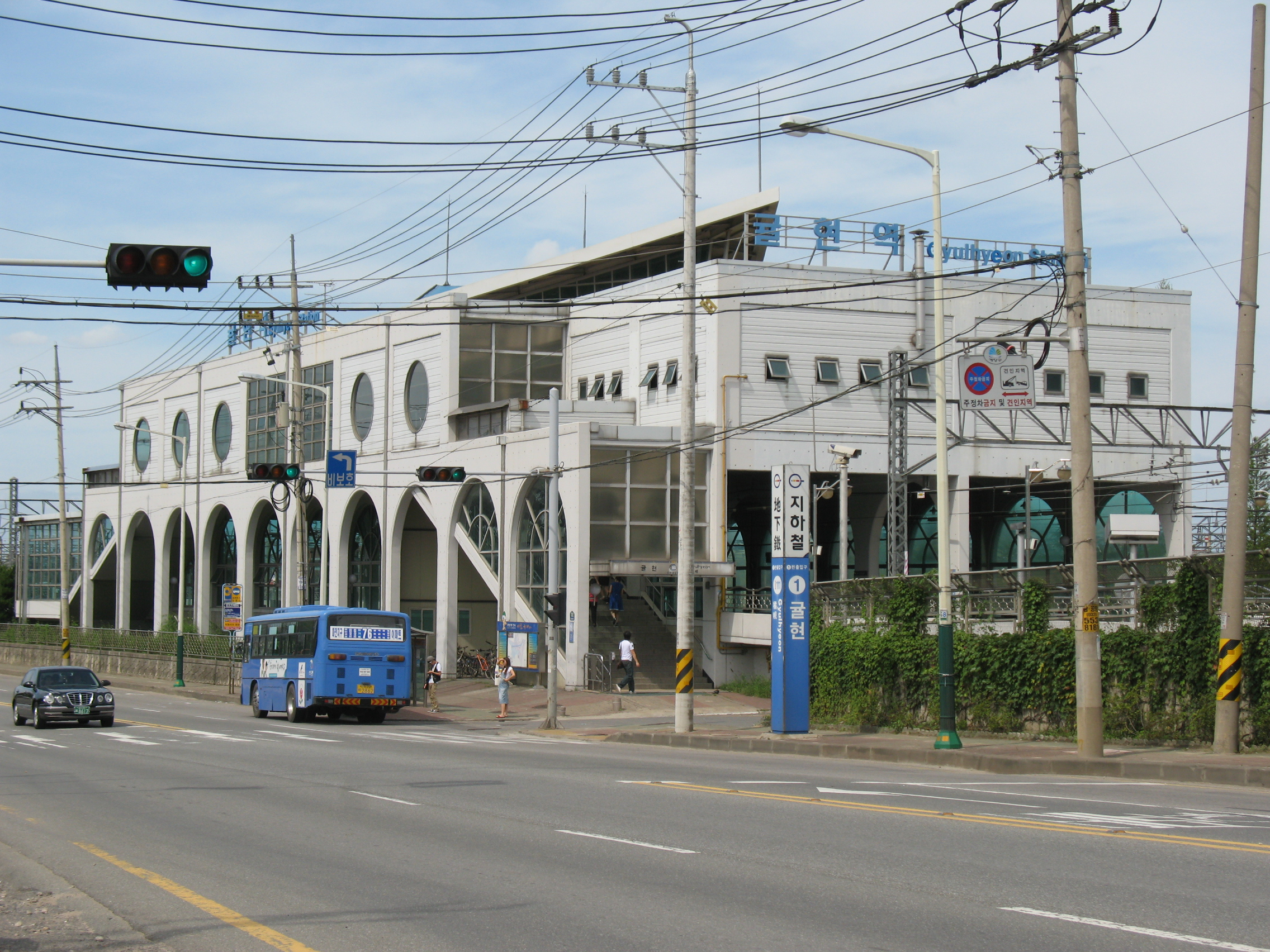

Korean name
- Hangul: 귤현역
- Hanja: 橘峴驛
- Revised Romanization: Gyulhyeonnyeok
- McCune–Reischauer: Kyurhyŏnnyŏk

General information
- Location: 187 Gyulhyeon-dong, 1134 Jangjero, Gyeyang-gu, Incheon
- Coordinates: 37°33′58.85″N 126°44′33.55″E
- Operator: Incheon Transit Corporation
- Line: Incheon Line 1
- Platforms: 2
- Tracks: 2

Construction
- Structure type: At-grade

Other information
- Station code: I111

History
- Opened: December 7, 1999; 26 years ago

Services
| Preceding station | Incheon Subway | Following station |
|---|---|---|
| Gyeyang towards Geomdan Lake Park | Incheon Line 1 | Bakchon towards Songdo Moonlight Festival Park |
Location

Gyulhyeon station (Korean: 귤현역; Hanja: 橘峴驛) is a subway station on Line 1 of the Incheon Subway in Gyeyang District, Incheon, South Korea.

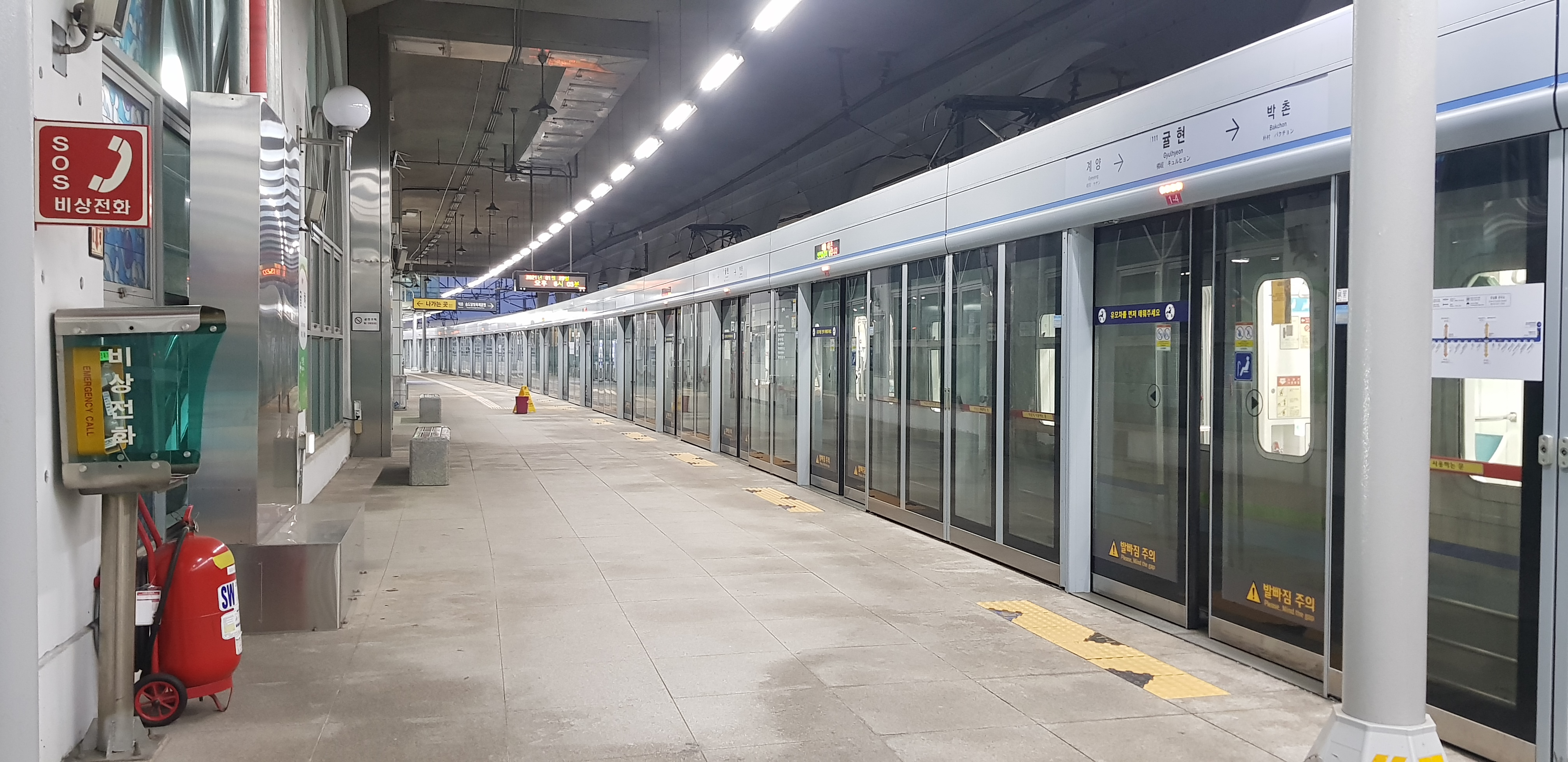
Platform

== Development ==
Gyulhyeon area was a green forest with no development. However, 182 pyeong of this area is scheduled to be developed into a "new city." Committee of planning Incheon city permitted to make these area into mini city area by 2010.

== Station layout ==
| G | Street Level |
| L1 | Concourse | Faregates, Ticketing Machines, Station Control |
| L2; Platforms | Side platform, doors will open on the right |
| L2; Platforms | Westbound | ← Incheon Line 1 toward Geomdan Lake Park (Gyeyang) |
| L2; Platforms | Eastbound | → Incheon Line 1 toward Songdo Moonlight Festival Park (Bakchon) → |
| L2; Platforms | Side platform, doors will open on the right |

== Vicinity ==
- Exit 1 : Gyeyang Middle School, Gyulhyeon Train Depot
