= Gyesan =

Gyesan is a district of Gyeyang which is a ward of Incheon, South Korea. It is 4.55 km squared. It was founded in 1946. There are 95,908 people living in Gyesan district. Gyesan's motto is "be a polite citizen." Gyesan is a residential and commercial district.

== Notable locations ==
- Gyeongin National University of Education
- Gyeongin National University of Education Station
- Gyeyang Mountain
- Gyongin Women's University
- Gyeyang City Library
- Gyesan Station
- Gyeyang District Office
- VIPS
- Lotte Mart, Home Plus
- Gyesan High School
- Gyesan Sports Center
