= 2014 Asian Games torch relay =

- Host city: Incheon, South Korea
- Distance: 5,700 km
- Start date: 13 August 2014
- End date: 19 September 2014

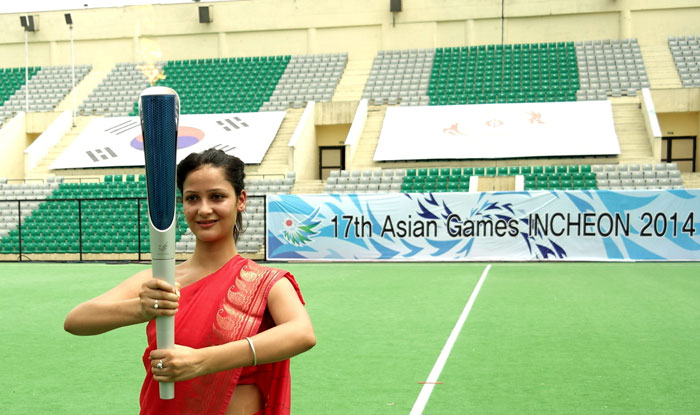
The torch in New Delhi

The 2014 Asian Games torch relay was held from August 13, 2014, and traveled through 70 cities for 5,700 km until the opening ceremony. Two cities were elected as the international torch relay leg, they are New Delhi, India on August 9, 2014 and Weihai, China on August 12, 2014, this also marked the first time the Games hosted by South Korea's city to have international torch relay.

The torch was first lit at Dhyan Chand National Stadium in New Delhi, India, on August 9, 2014, marking the first time the torch was lit outside the host country. The flame from New Delhi was combined with the Manisan Mountain flame at a ceremony on 13 August 2014 on Ganghwado Island to mark the beginning of the national leg of the relay. Both flames were generated from parabolic mirrors directed straight at the sun.

== Route in South Korea ==

August 13
1. Incheon Culture and Arts Center
August 14
2. Yeonan Port
3. Baengnyeongdo

August 16
4. Gimpo International Airport
5. Jeju Province

August 17
6. Gimhae International Airport
7. Pohang
August 18
8. Ulleungdo
9. Pohang
August 19
10. Gyeongju
11. Ulsan
12. Ansan
August 20
13. Ansan
14. Hwaseong
15. Suwon
August 21
16. Anseong
17. Pyeongtaek
18. Cheonan
August 22
19. Asan
20. Yesan
21. Hongseong

August 25
22. Boryeong
23. Gunsan
24. Gwangju

August 26
25. Gangjin
26. Haenam
27. Mokpo
28. Muan
August 27
29. Yeosu
30. Suncheon
August 28
31. Gwangyang
32. Jinju
August 29
33. Samcheong-dong
34. Namwon
35. Jeonju

September 1
36. Iksan
37. Nonsan
38. Gyeryong
39. Daejeon

September 2
40. Sejong
41. Chungju
September 3
42. Mungyeong
43. Gumi
44. Daegu
September 4
45. Cheongdo
46. Miryang
47. Changwon
September 5
48. Tongyeong
49. Geoje
50. Busan

September 10
51. Andong

September 11
52. Andong
53. Jecheon
54. Wonju
September 12
55. Pyeongchang
56. Gangneung
September 13
57. Sokcho
58. Inje
59. Hongcheon
60. Chuncheon

September 15
61. Uijeongbu
62. Hanam
63. Seongnam
64. Anyang

September 16
65. Bucheon
66. Goyang
67. Seoul
September 17
68. Ganghwado
69. Yeongjongdo
70. Yeonsu District
September 18
71. Jung District
72. Dong District
73. Nam District
74. Namdong District
September 19
75. Bupyeong District
76. Gyeyang District
77. Seo District
78. Incheon Asiad Main Stadium
