= Galsan station =

Metro station in Incheon, South Korea

I117 갈산 Galsan
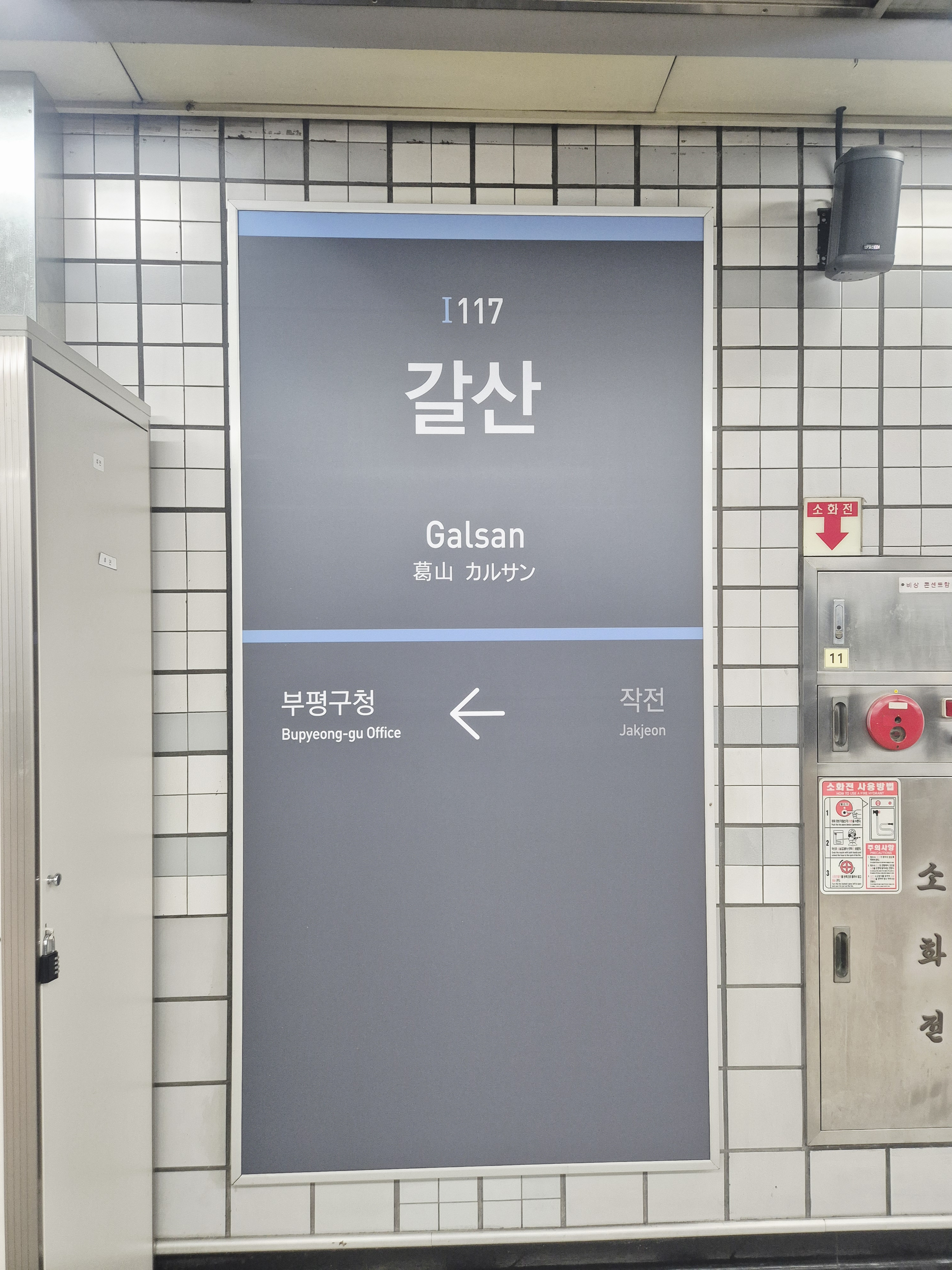

Korean name
- Hangul: 갈산역
- Hanja: 葛山驛
- Revised Romanization: Galsannyeok
- McCune–Reischauer: Kalsannyŏk

General information
- Location: 112 Cheongcheon-dong, 282 Bupyeongdaero Jiha, Bupyeong-gu, Incheon
- Coordinates: 37°31′02″N 126°43′17″E
- Operator: Incheon Transit Corporation
- Line: Incheon Line 1
- Platforms: 2
- Tracks: 2

Construction
- Structure type: Underground
- Cycle facilities: Yes

Other information
- Station code: I117

History
- Opened: October 6, 1999; 27 years ago

Passengers
- 2017: 17,775

Services
Preceding station	Incheon Subway	Following station
Jakjeon towards Geomdan Lake Park	Incheon Line 1	Bupyeong-gu Office towards Songdo Moonlight Festival Park
Location

Galsan Station (Korean: 갈산역; Hanja: 葛山驛) is a subway station on Line 1 of the Incheon Subway in Bupyeong District, Incheon, South Korea.

== Station layout ==
G	Street Level
L1	Concourse	Faregates, Ticketing Machines, Station Control
L2; Platforms	Side platform, doors will open on the right
L2; Platforms	Westbound	← Incheon Line 1 toward Geomdan Lake Park (Jakjeon)
L2; Platforms	Eastbound	→ Incheon Line 1 toward Songdo Moonlight Festival Park (Bupyeong-gu Office) →
L2; Platforms	Side platform, doors will open on the right

== Exits ==
Exit No.	Image	Destinations
1		Bupyeong fire station E-Mart
2		Bupyeong Gwangwang Hotel
3		Daewoo Motors
4		Woolim Lions Valley
