= 2010 G20 Seoul summit =

Fifth meeting of the G20

G20 Summit on Financial Markets and the World Economy 5th G20 summit
- 11–13 November 2010

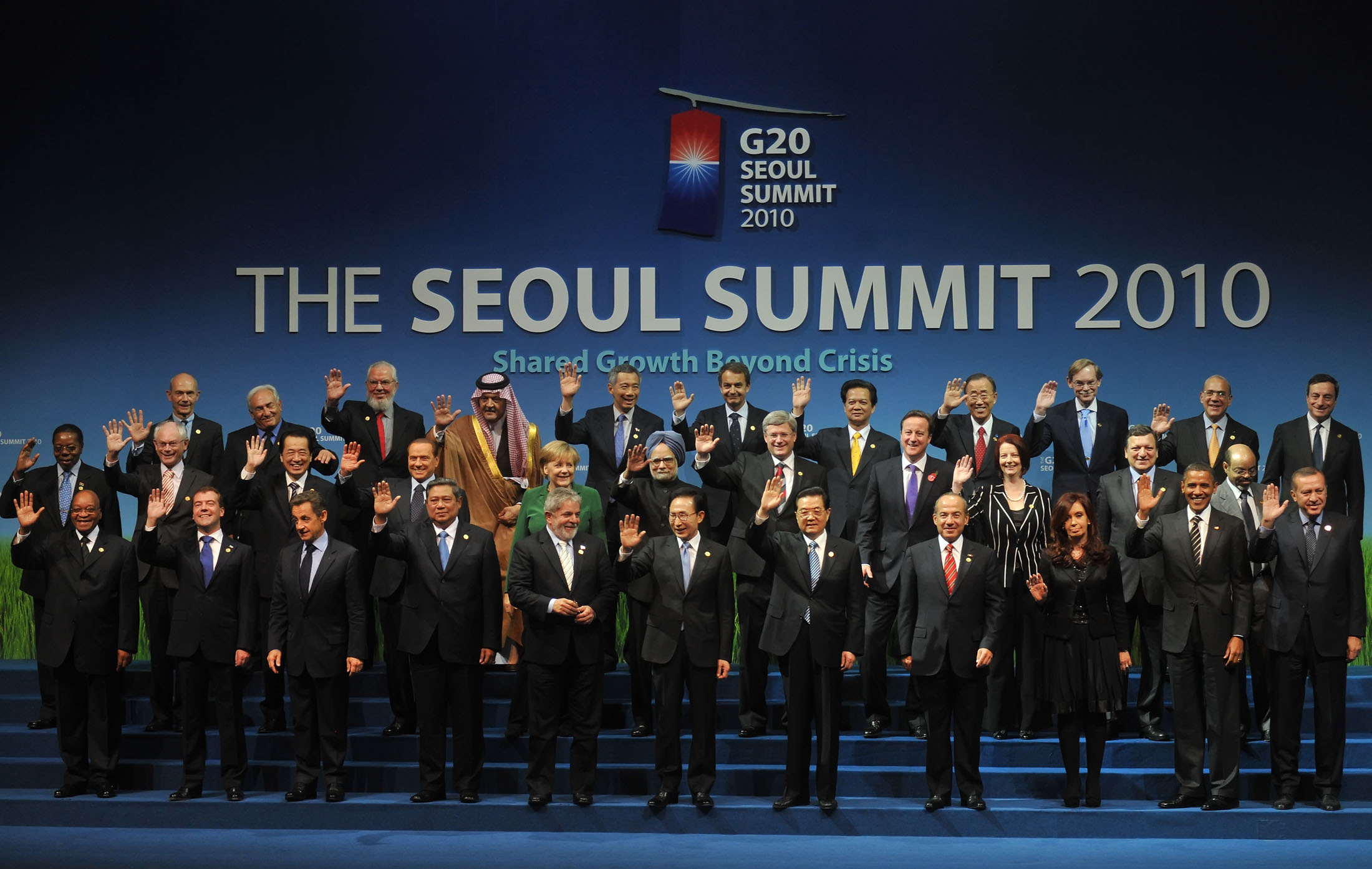
- World leaders at the 2010 G20 Seoul summit
- Host country: South Korea
- Cities: Seoul
- Venues: COEX Convention & Exhibition Center
- Participants: G20; Invited states: Algeria; Ethiopia; Malawi; Singapore, Spain, Vietnam; Invited organizations: ASEAN, AU, FSB, 3G, ILO, IMF, NEPAD, OECD, UN, WBG, WTO
- Chair: Lee Myung-bak

The fifth meeting of the G20 heads of government/heads of state, to discuss the global financial system and the world economy, took place in Seoul, the capital of South Korea, on 11–13 November 2010. South Korea was the first non-G8 nation to host a G20 leaders' summit.

The G20 is the premier forum for discussing, planning, and monitoring international economic cooperation.

The theme of the summit was "Shared Growth Beyond Crisis".

== Agenda ==
The summit leaders addressed several mid- and long-term policy issues, including

- Ensuring global economic recovery
- Framework for strong, sustainable, and balanced global growth
- Strengthening the international financial regulatory system
- Modernizing the international financial institutions
- Global financial safety nets
- Development issues
- The risk of a currency war

Representatives met in advance of the leaders' summit. These sherpas were tasked to draft a closing statement for the summit. The debate over currency exchange rates and imbalances was reported to have been "heated".

== Preparations ==
The summit logo incorporated two images: the sun rising over the sea and a traditional Korean lantern (cheongsachorong).

Originally, three new artificial islands built on the Han River between the Banpo and Dongjak bridges were going to be used as the main venue. However, delayed construction of the islands led for the main summit venue to relocate to COEX Convention & Exhibition Center.

The Republic of Korea Armed Forces and Seoul Metropolitan Police Agency provided security for the venues.

A group of South Korean artists, consisting of Gyu-ri, Seohyun, Jun. K, Changmin, Jaekyung, Jonghyun, Sungmin, Kahi, Luna, Ji Eun, Junhyung, Gayoon, Min, G.O, Bumkey, G.NA, Son Dam-bi, Seo In-guk, IU, and Anna, credited as Group of 20 recorded a song titled "Let's Go" for the summit.

=== Transportation ===
Most world leaders and international media arrived via Incheon International Airport and traveled to the summit venue via motorcades along the highway from the airport.

Transportation around the summit venue was upgraded with electric buses to help media and others around the city.

== Attendance ==
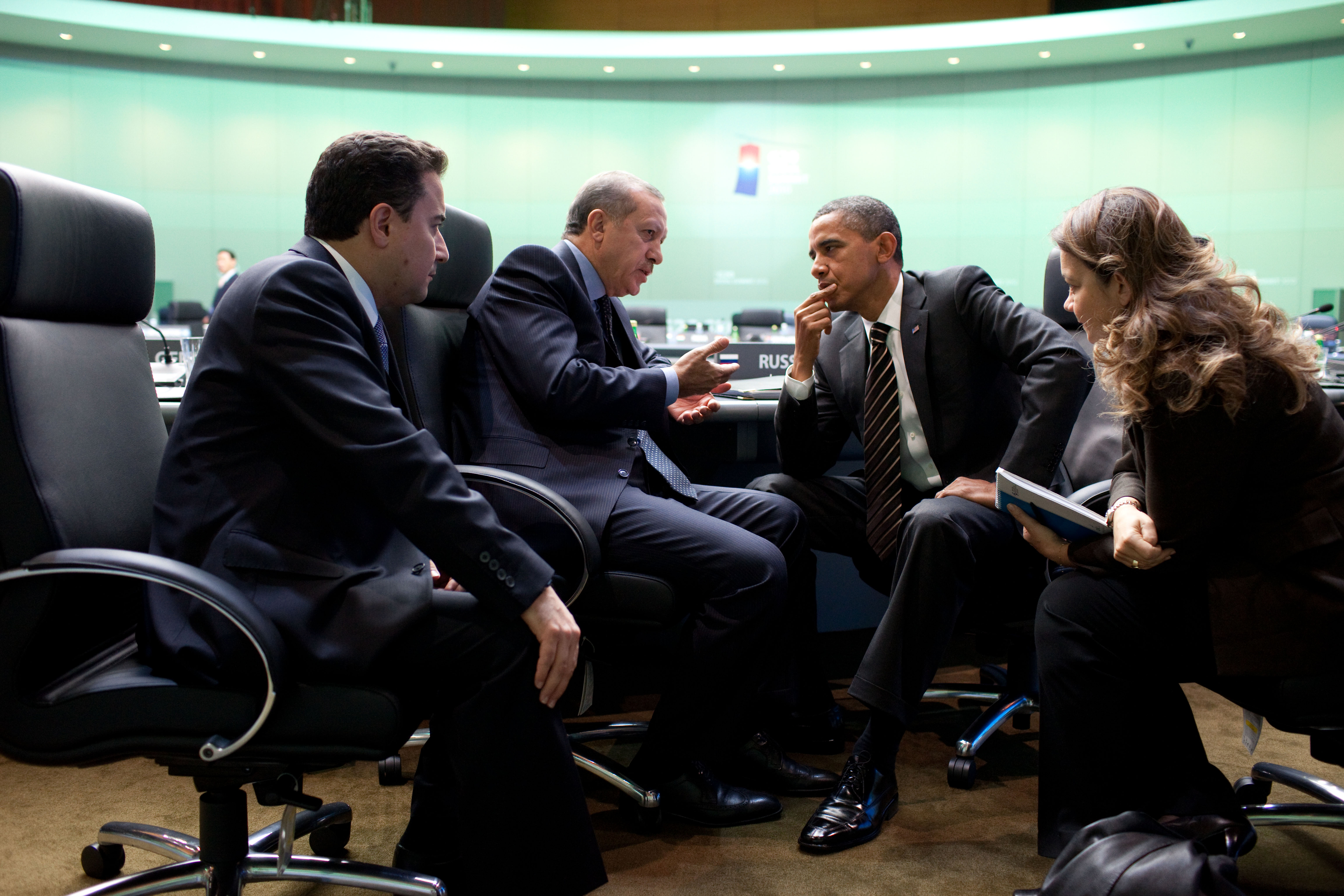
American President Obama and Turkish Prime Minister Erdoğan in conversation.

The participants of the Seoul summit included the leaders and representatives of core members of the G20, which comprises 19 countries and the European Union, which is represented by its two governing bodies, the European Council and the European Commission. Representatives from other countries and regional organizations were invited to take part in the summit.

The South Korean government declined to invite the Netherlands, which had been invited to attend all four previous G20 summits. A Korean spokesman said that "a certain region had been over-represented" in the past; and for this Asian summit, Singapore was invited.

This was the first summit at which there were four women among the leaders. In addition to President Cristina Fernández de Kirchner of Argentina, Prime Minister Julia Gillard of Australia, Chancellor Angela Merkel of Germany, and the president-elect of Brazil, Dilma Rousseff, accompanied her nation's delegation.

This was the first G20 summit for Australia's Prime Minister Gillard, who had only been elected shortly before the Toronto summit. This was also the first opportunity for Prime Minister Lee Hsien Loong of Singapore to listen and to make his voice heard at the G20 leaders' meetings.

G20 members Host nation and leader are indicated in bold text.
Member		Represented by	Title
(Argentina)	Argentina	Cristina Fernández de Kirchner	President
(Australia)	Australia	Julia Gillard	Prime Minister
(Brazil)	Brazil	Luiz Inácio Lula da Silva	President
(Canada)	Canada	Stephen Harper	Prime Minister
(China)	China	Hu Jintao	President
(France)	France	Nicolas Sarkozy	President
(Germany)	Germany	Angela Merkel	Chancellor
(India)	India	Manmohan Singh	Prime Minister
(Indonesia)	Indonesia	Susilo Bambang Yudhoyono	President
(Italy)	Italy	Silvio Berlusconi	Prime Minister
(Japan)	Japan	Naoto Kan	Prime Minister
(Mexico)	Mexico	Felipe Calderón	President
(Russia)	Russia	Dmitry Medvedev	President
(Saudi Arabia)	Saudi Arabia	Saud bin Faisal bin Abdulaziz Al Saud	Foreign Minister
(South Africa)	South Africa	Jacob Zuma	President
(South Korea)	**South Korea**	**Lee Myung-bak**	**President**
(Turkey)	Turkey	Recep Tayyip Erdoğan	Prime Minister
(United Kingdom)	United Kingdom	David Cameron	Prime Minister
(United States)	United States	Barack Obama	President
(European Union)	European Commission	José Manuel Barroso	President
(European Union)	European Council	Herman Van Rompuy	President
**Invited states**
State		Represented by	Title
(Ethiopia)	Ethiopia	Meles Zenawi	Prime Minister
(Malawi)	Malawi	Bingu wa Mutharika	President
(Singapore)	Singapore	Lee Hsien Loong	Prime Minister
(Spain)	Spain	José Luis Rodríguez Zapatero	Prime Minister
(Vietnam)	Vietnam	Nguyễn Tấn Dũng	Prime Minister
**International organisations**
Organisation		Represented by	Title
	African Union	Bingu wa Mutharika	Chairman
	ASEAN	Surin Pitsuwan	Secretary General
	ASEAN	Nguyễn Tấn Dũng	Chairman
	Financial Stability Forum	Mario Draghi	Chairman
	International Labour Organization	Juan Somavía	Head
	International Monetary Fund	Dominique Strauss-Kahn	Managing Director
	NEPAD	Meles Zenawi	Chairman
	OECD	José Ángel Gurría	Secretary-General
(United Nations)	United Nations	Ban Ki-moon	Secretary General
	World Bank Group	Robert Zoellick	President
	World Trade Organization	Pascal Lamy	Director-General

== Security ==
Security for the G20 summit presented a unique array of problems. In addition to the security of the main venue, COEX, South Korea was more broadly responsible for providing a safe venue for the delegations who come to the summit. The National Police Agency led the security detail for the summit, both at the convention venue and the airport as well. Other police and security agencies involved were:

- Presidential Security Service
- National Intelligence Service
- Ministry of National Defense
- National Emergency Management Agency

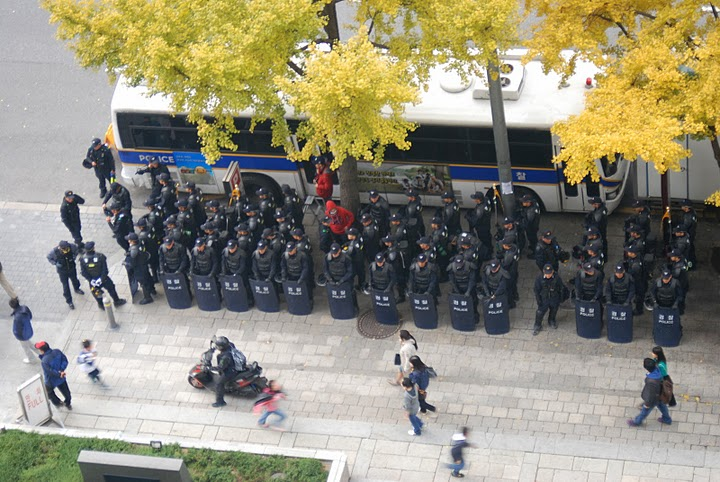
A squad of riot police in front of the Korea Press Center in downtown Seoul — November 7, 2010

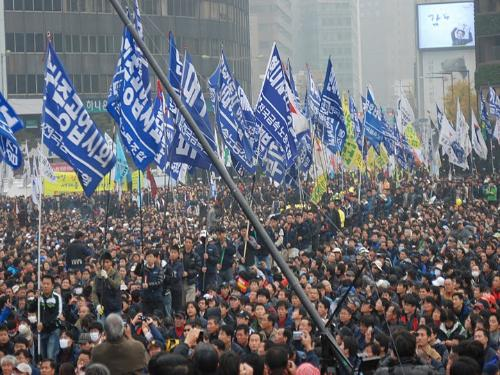
Demonstrators converged on downtown Seoul in protest against the G20 leaders' summit. The labor rally took place in Seoul City Plaza near city hall — November 7, 2010

In preparation, anti-terrorism drills were held by members of the South Korean police, military, special forces and private sector as part of the 2010 Ulchi-Freedom Guardian exercises against simulated hostage situations and chemical, biological and radiological attacks as a preparation for the summit.

Plans for accommodating peaceful protesters were paired with plans for mitigating disruptive demonstrations.

The G20 raised security concerns unrelated to demonstrators protesting the presence of the leaders of 20 economies in Seoul. For example, some analysts projected that anything perceived as a success for South Korea would be simultaneously construed in Pyongyang as a threat to North Korea.

Despite public endorsements by attending leaders, most commentators looking back on the summit have argued that only limited progress was made, especially on the headline issue of currency war and addressing trade imbalances. Leaders were generally unable to agree on key issues, with commentators such as economist Eswar Prasad noting the absence of the sense of unity that had been present at summits during the worse of the 2008 financial crisis. IMF managing director Dominique Strauss-Kahn said this particular summit was "more of a G20 debate than a G20 conclusion".

Relating to the need to rebalance the world economy, agreement had been reached to work on indicative guidelines which will set suggested maximum limits for current account surpluses and deficits, though these are not due to be fleshed out until 2011. G20 leaders also agreed to endorse the Seoul Development Consensus, a set of guidelines and principles for working together with less development nations to improve economic growth and reduce poverty. In contrast to the older Washington Consensus which it supersedes, the Seoul Consensus is less free market–orientated, allowing a larger role for state intervention.

== See also ==
- Club of Madrid
