= Hyun-bin =

- Hangul: 현빈
- RR: Hyeonbin
- MR: Hyŏnbin

Hyun-bin or Hyun-been (Korean: 현빈) is a Korean given name. Notable people with the name include:

- Hong Hyun-bin (born 1997), South Korean baseball outfielder
- Kwon Hyun-bin, South Korean actor, rapper, and model
- Moon Hyun-bin (born 2004), South Korean baseball outfielder
- Park Hyun-bin (born 1982), South Korean trot singer
- Park Hyun-bin (born 2003), South Korean footballer
- Shin Hyun-been, South Korean actress
