= Gyeongin National University of Education =

Training institution in South Korea

Coordinates: 37.5382°N 126.7163°E

- 경인교육대학교
- Motto: Great power (큰 힘); Great love (큰 사랑); Great light (큰 빛)
- Type: National
- Established: 1946
- President: Kim Wang Jun (김왕준)
- Faculty: 127
- Location: [Incheon Campus] (Gyesan-dong san 59-12) 45 Gyodae-Gil Gyeyang-gu Incheon [Gyeonggi Campus] San 6-8 Seoksu-dong, Manan-gu, Anyang, Gyeonggi Province, Incheon & Anyang, South Korea
- Campus: Urban
- Mascots: Crane, Forsythia, Pine Tree
- Website: http://www.ginue.ac.kr/
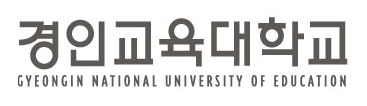

- Gyeongin National University of Education
- Hangul: 경인교육대학교
- Hanja: 京仁敎育大學校
- RR: Gyeongin gyoyuk daehakgyo
- MR: Kyŏngin kyoyuk taehakkyo

Gyeongin National University of Education (GINUE; Korean: 경인교육대학교) is a teacher training institution for future public elementary school teachers in South Korea. It was founded on May 23, 1946 under the name of Gaeseong School of Education in Gyeonggi-do (경기도립 개성사범학교). In 2003, the institution changed its name from Inchon National University of Education (INUE) (인천교육대학교) to Gyeongin National University of Education. The university is the largest educational institute for training future elementary school teachers in Korea.

The university has two campuses: Incheon campus in Gyesan-dong, Gyeyang District, Incheon, and Gyeonggi campus in Seoksu-dong, Manan District, Anyang in Gyeonggi Province. The university offers graduate and undergraduate programs, and has an elementary school attached.

== History ==
On 23 May 1946, the school was founded as the Gaeseong School of Education in Gyeonggi Province (경기도립 개성사범학교). The fourth graduation ceremony took place on 25 March 1952, with 621 people graduating. On 28 June 1952 the school changed its name to the Inchon National School of Education (국립 인천사범학교), and its change of location was approved. On 10 April 1957 an affiliated elementary school opened (인천사범학교 부속국민학교).

The tenth graduation ceremony took place on 12 February 1962, with 2,142 graduates. The Inchon College of Education (인천교육대학) opened on 26 March 1962, and on 1 March 1963 the college opened an affiliated training center for Elementary School Teachers (부설초등교육연수원).

On 1 March 1982, the college was elevated to a four-year college. On 30 July 1990 the college moved to a new campus in Gyesan-dong. On 1 March 1993 the college changed its name to the Inchon National University of Education (인천교육대학교). On 16 August 1995 the university opened a Life-Long Education Center (대학 부설 평생교육원), followed by a graduate school of education on 2 March 1996.

In 1998 and 2002, the university was ranked first nationally in an evaluation of domestic universities by the newspaper JoongAng Ilbo. In 2000 the university was named the best university in another evaluation of education universities and graduate schools in the country.

On 1 March 2003, the university again changed its name, from Inchon National University of Education to Gyeongin National University of Education (경인교육대학교). On 18 May 2004, the university opened a Distant Education and Training Support Center (부설 교육대학 원격 교육·연수지원센터). On 17 September 2004, the university was selected as an excellent specialized university in the metropolitan area. In March 2005 the university opened a new campus in Gyeonggi campus. On 8 February 2007, the Ministry of Education and Human Resources Development selected the university as the best university of education and graduate school of education. It was also selected for the fifth time in the 5-year Metropolitan area universities specialization project in May 2008.

On 25 August 2008, the university was named the best university in an evaluation of faculty academic achievements at national universities. Dong-Gweon Chung was inaugurated as the fifth president on 31 March 2009. On 20 April 2009, the university was chosen as a member university in the national project of college-educational capability reinforcement.

== Academics ==
=== Undergraduate College ===
Due to the university's specialized purpose, the undergraduate college only offers one major, in Elementary Education. However, students can also choose from specialized courses, which cover deeper educational techniques in specific areas. Departments offering specialized courses include Ethics Education, Korean Education, Social Studies Education, Mathematics Education, Science Education, Physical Education, Music Education, Art Education, Practical Arts Education, Computer Education, Education, Early Childhood, and English Education.

=== Graduate school ===
The graduate school of education opened on 2 March 1996 in order to produce competent educators for the advancement of elementary education. There are currently 305 full-time students enrolled majoring in 15 different programs, including majors in Elementary Education Administration, Elementary Education methods, Special Elementary Education, Elementary School Counseling, Elementary Ethics Education, Elementary Korean Education, Elementary Social Education, Elementary Mathematics Education, Elementary Science Education, Elementary Physical Education, Elementary Music Education, Elementary Arts Education, Elementary Practical Arts Education, Elementary Computer Education, Elementary English Education.

== See also ==
- List of national universities in South Korea
- List of universities and colleges in South Korea
- Education in Korea
