= Cheongsachorong =

Traditional Korean red and blue lantern

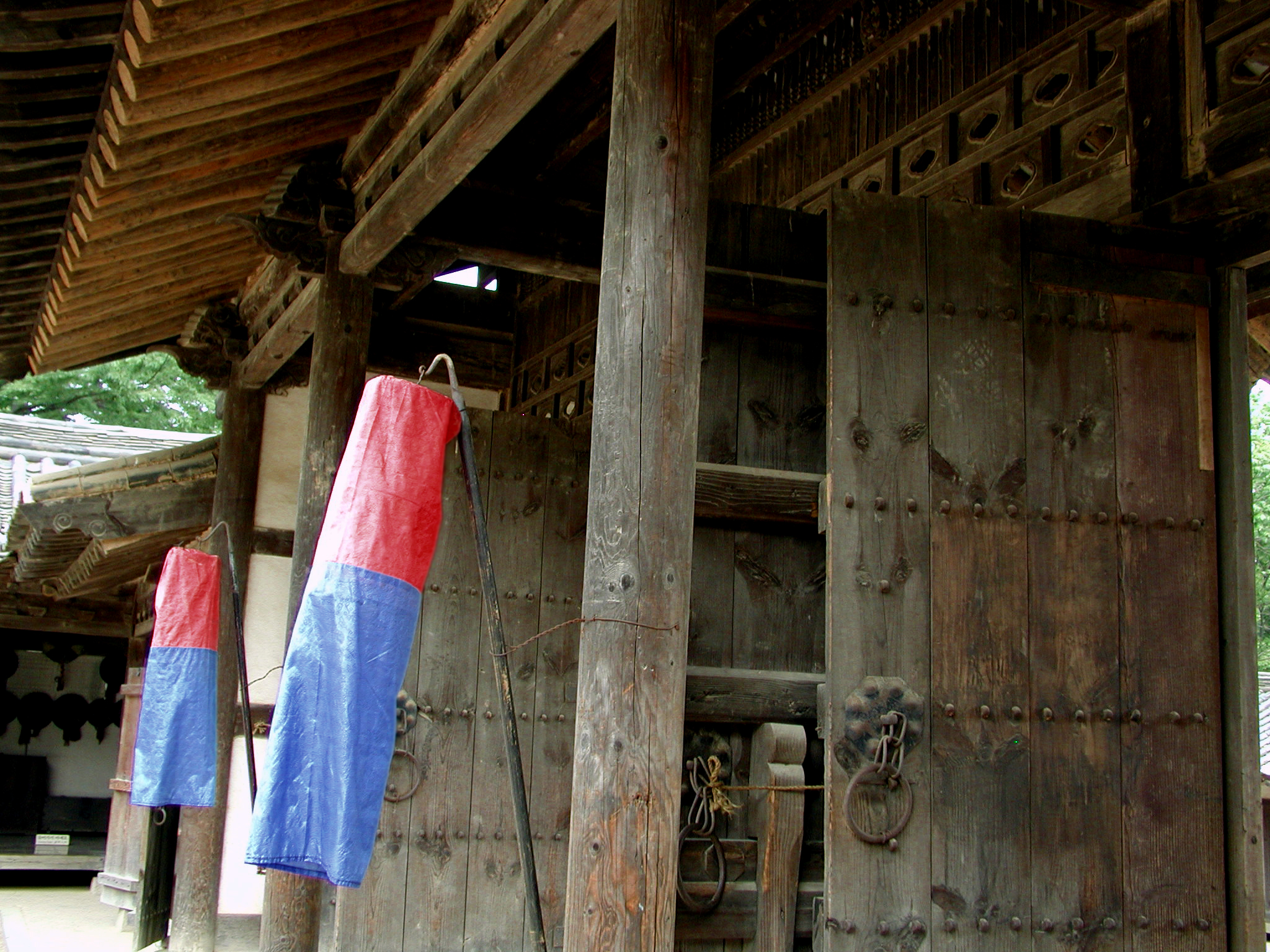
- Two lanterns welcoming guests to a traditional Korean wedding ceremony

Korean name
- Hangul: 청사초롱
- Hanja: 靑紗초籠
- RR: cheongsachorong
- MR: ch'ŏngsach'orong

A cheongsachorong (Korean: 청사초롱) is a traditional Korean lantern. It is typically made by joining red and blue silk shades and hanging a candle inside the body. The two colors are said to represent yin and yang.

Since the Joseon period, the lanterns have been largely associated with wedding ceremonies. In recent years, the lantern has become displayed in various other settings in South Korea. This lantern, like many other South Korean lanterns, are made of bamboo and usually wood. History of this lantern, is debatable, but some sources say that this lantern dates back to the Joseon period.

A stylized cheongsachorong has been featured as the logo of the 2010 G-20 Seoul summit.
