= Gyeyang District =

District of Incheon, South Korea

Coordinates: 37°32′13″N 126°44′16″E

Gyeyang
- Autonomous District
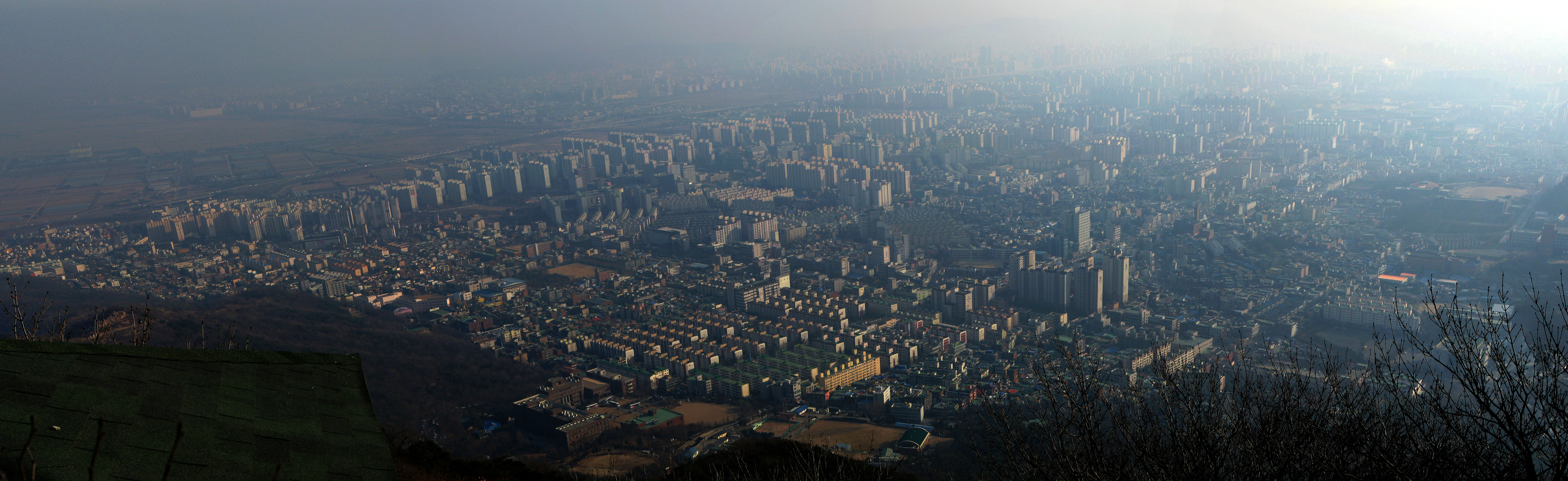

- Flag

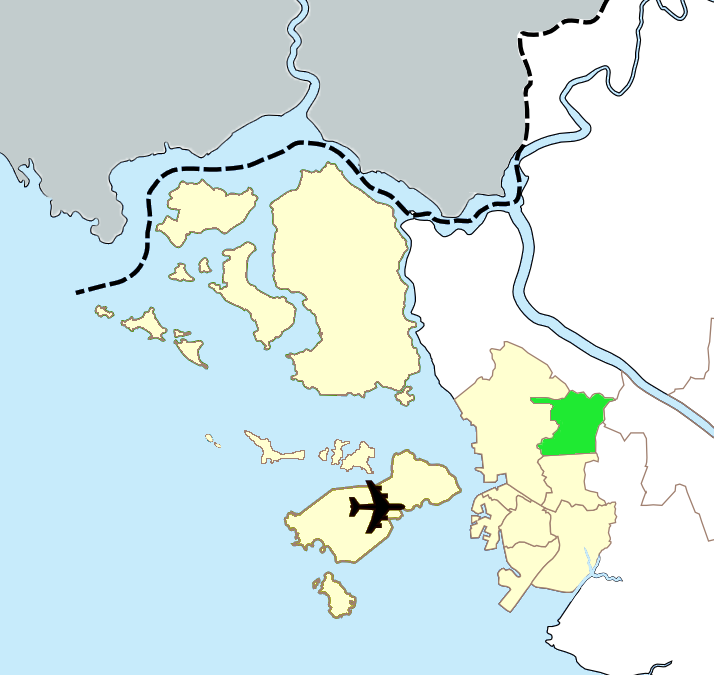
- Country: South Korea
- Region: Sudogwon
- Provincial level: Incheon
- Administrative divisions: 11 administrative dong

Area
  - Total: 45.58 km^{2} (17.60 sq mi)

Population (September 2024)
  - Total: 281,172
  - Density: 6,169/km^{2} (15,980/sq mi)
  - Dialect: Seoul
- Website: Gyeyang District Office

Korean name
- Hangul: 계양구
- Hanja: 桂陽區
- RR: Gyeyang-gu
- MR: Kyeyang-gu

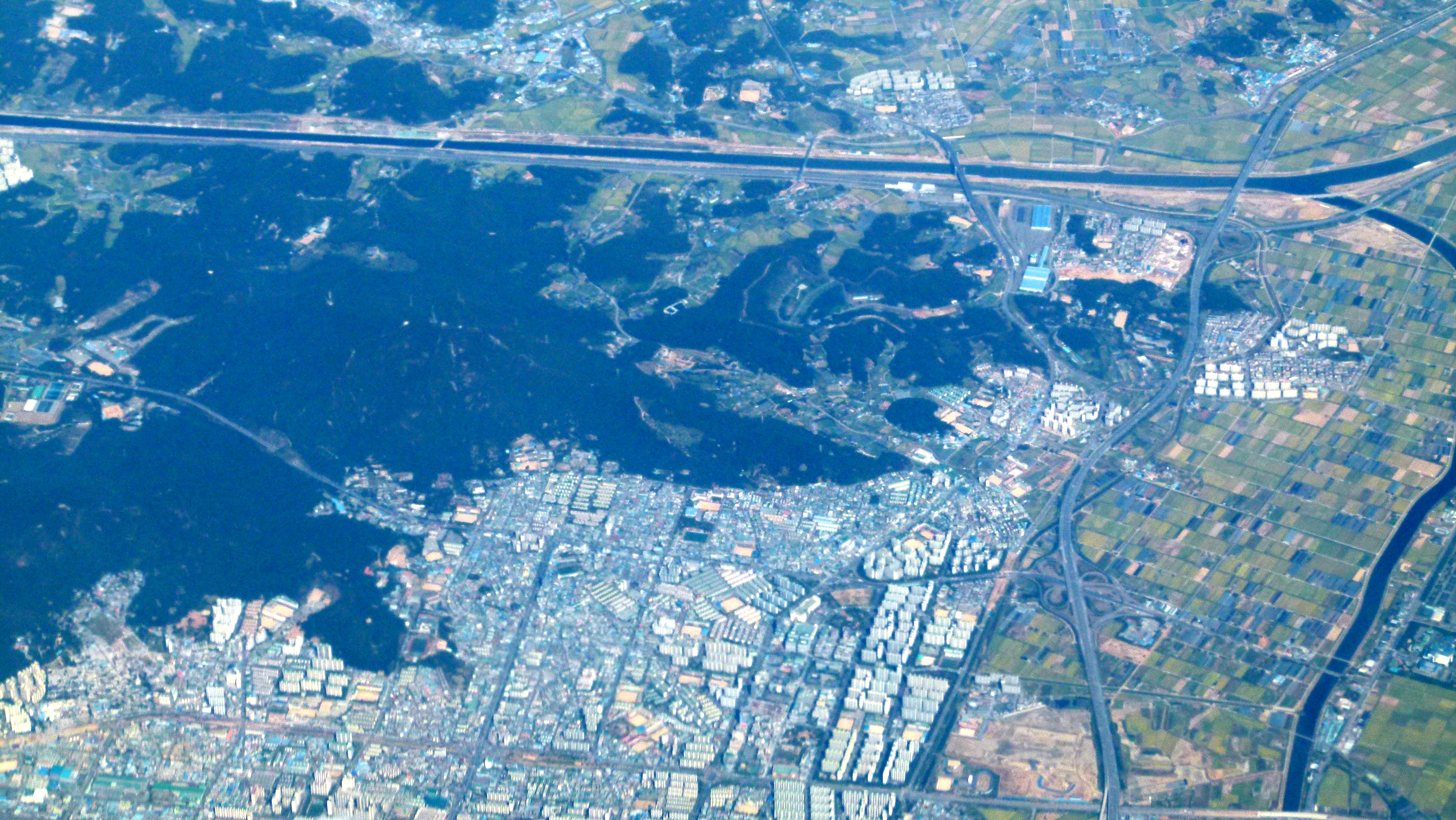
Bird's eye view of Gyeyang

Gyeyang District (Korean: 계양구; IPA: [kje.jaŋ.ɡu]) is a ward in Incheon, South Korea.

== History ==
The first historical record of Gyeyang District goes back to the Goguryeo kingdom in 470 AD under the name of Jubuto-gun. It was renamed to Bupyeong-dohobu in 1413 AD. It was later renamed Gyeyang-myeon and it was renamed again Buk-Gu (North Ward), Incheon as it was annexed to Incheon in 1989. Bupyeong District, Gyeyang District, and Seo District were all formed out of this ward. Seo-gu was separated out in 1988, and both Gyeyang District, and Bupyeong District were formed in 1995.

== Location ==
Gyeyang District borders Bupyeong District to the south, Seo-gu to the west, Seoul's Gangseo-gu and Bucheon to the east, and Gimpo's Gochon-myeon to the north.

== Points of interest ==
Bupyeongdohobu Government Building - Originally built during the reign of King Sejong (1413–1487 AD), it was destroyed during the Japanese invasion of 1592 and again during the Qing invasion of 1636. It was last rebuilt during the reign of King Sukjong (1674–1720 AD)

Gyeyang Mountain (395m, part of the Hannam-jeongmaek mountain range) is located in the northern part of the ward, and is mainland Incheon's highest point (Mani Mountain, located on Ganghwa Island is 469m tall.) Many hiking trails lead around and to the peak of the mountain.

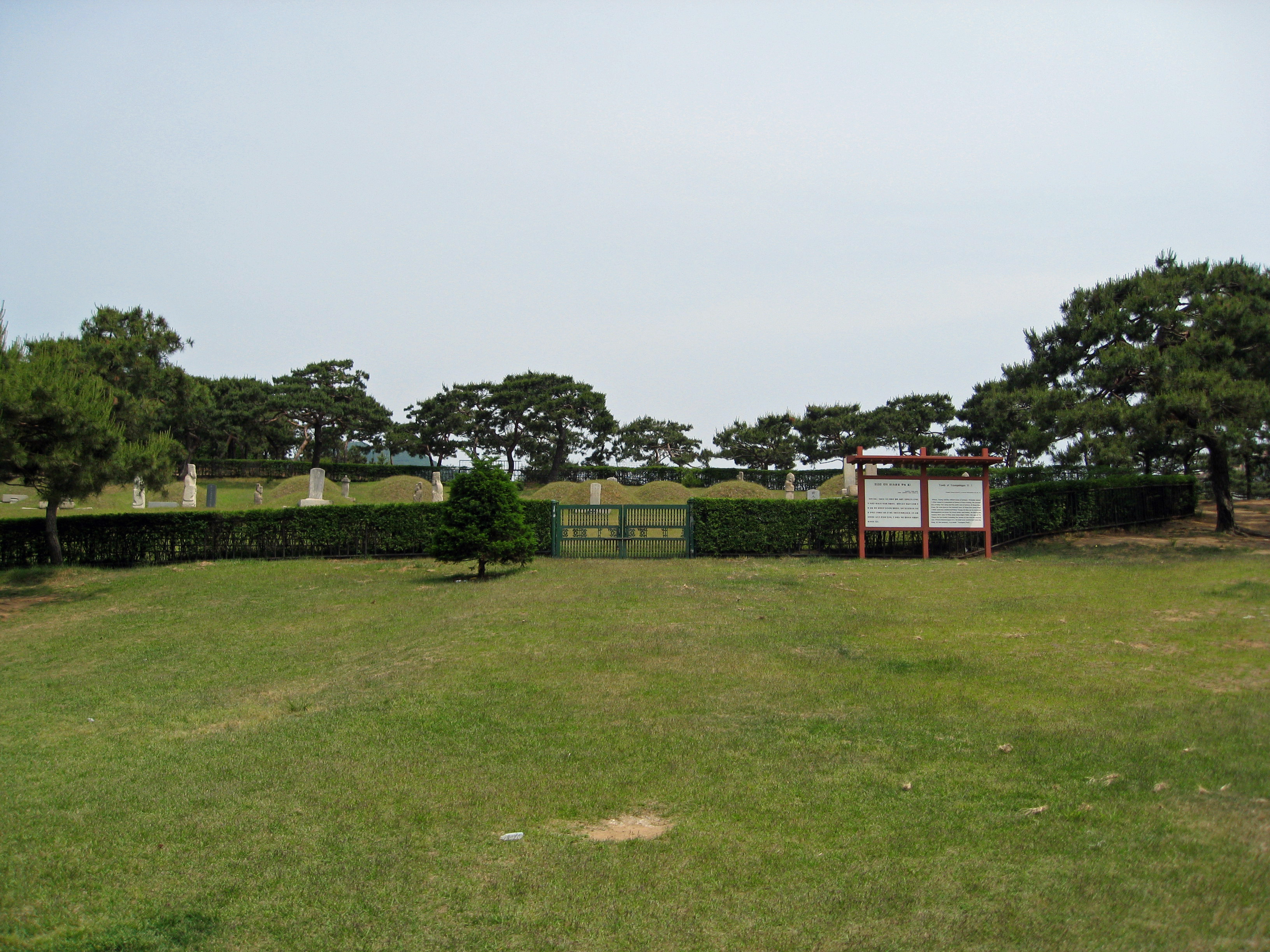
Tomb of Youngshingun Yi I

Tomb of Youngshingun Yi I- Yi I (1424–1526 AD), whose royal name was Youngshingun, was the sixth son of UI Song Gun Chae, who was a son of Prince Hyo-ryeong, who was the second son of King Tae Jong. He was conferred his royal title after giving distinguished service to the royal family and the nation.

== Administrative Divisions of Gyeyang District ==
Administrative divisions

- Hyoseong 1 and 2 Dong
- Gyesan 1 to 4 Dong
- Jakjeon 1 and 2 Dong
- Jakjeon-Seoun Dong (combination of Jakjeon-dong and Seoun-dong)
- Gyeyang 1-dong (divided in turn into Bakchon-dong, Dongyang-dong, Gyulhyeon-dong, Sangya-dong. Haya-dong, Pyeongdong, Nooji-dong, Seonjuji-dong, Ihwa-dong, Oryu-dong, Galhyeon-dong, Duksil-dong, Moksang-dong, Danam-dong and Janggi-dong)
- Gyeyang 2-dong (divided in turn into Imhak-dong, Yeongjong-dong, Byeongbang-dong and Bangchuk-dong)

== Transportation ==
Gyeyang District is served by Incheon Subway Line 1. It also served by AREX.

== Education ==
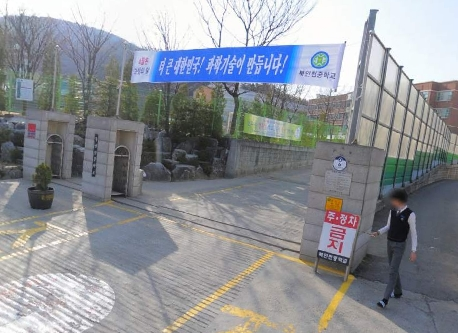
Bugincheon Middle School

Gyeongin National University of Education has a campus in Gyeyang District.

Bugincheon Middle School in Gyesan-1 Dong opened in 1999. It has three buildings. During the period 2008 to 2010, it enrolled 1288 students, equally divided between boys and girls. English language is one area of instruction.
