= List of tallest buildings in Incheon =

This list of tallest buildings in Incheon ranks skyscrapers in the South Korean city of Incheon by height.

== Tallest buildings ==
Only buildings over 150m (as determined by the Council on Tall Buildings and Urban Habitat) are included.

Rank	Name	Image	Height m (ft)	Floors	Year	District	Notes
1	Northeast Asia Trade Tower		305 m (1,001 ft)	68	2011	Yeonsu District	
2	Songdo The Sharp First World Tower 1		235 m (771 ft)	65	2009	Yeonsu District	
2	Songdo The Sharp First World Tower 2		235 m (771 ft)	64	2009	Yeonsu District	
2	Songdo The Sharp First World Tower 3		235 m (771 ft)	64	2009	Yeonsu District	
2	Songdo The Sharp First World Tower 4		235 m (771 ft)	64	2009	Yeonsu District	
6	Artwin Tower 1		208 m (682 ft)	60	2015	Yeonsu District	
6	Artwin Tower 2		208 m (682 ft)	60	2015	Yeonsu District	
8	Songdo Campus Town 101		207 m (679 ft)	55	2016	Yeonsu District	
9	Yonghyun Exllu Tower 103		192 m (630 ft)	55	2012	Nam District	
10	Cheongna Posco The Lake Park 2801		190 m (620 ft)	58	2012	Seo District	
10	Cheongna Exllu Tower 1		190 m (620 ft)	55	2012	Seo District	
10	Cheongna Exllu Tower 2		190 m (620 ft)	55	2012	Seo District	
10	Songdo Posco Centroad Tower 1		190 m (620 ft)	45	2011	Yeonsu District	
14	Cheongna Daewoo Prugio Cluster Tower 1		189 m (620 ft)	58	2013	Seo District	
15	Cheongna Daewoo Prugio Cluster Tower 2		188 m (617 ft)	50	2013	Seo District	
15	Hanwha Eco Metro Apartments Complex 103		188 m (617 ft)	50	2011	Namdong District	
17	Songdo Posco E&C Center Tower 1		185 m (607 ft)	39	2010	Yeonsu District	
17	Songdo Posco E&C Center Tower 2		185 m (607 ft)	39	2010	Yeonsu District	
19	Cheongna Daewoo Prugio Cluster Tower 3		184 m (604 ft)	49	2013	Seo District	
19	Songdo Campus Town 102		184 m (604 ft)	49	2016	Yeonsu District	
19	Songdo Campus Town 104		184 m (604 ft)	49	2016	Yeonsu District	
22	Cheongna Daewoo Prugio Cluster Tower 4		181 m (594 ft)	48	2013	Seo District	
23	Cheongna Posco The Lake Park 2802		180 m (590 ft)	55	2012	Seo District	
23	Cheongna Posco The Lake Park 2803		180 m (590 ft)	55	2012	Seo District	
23	Cheongna Posco The Lake Park 2804		180 m (590 ft)	55	2012	Seo District	
23	Yeonsu Daewoo Prugio Park View Tower A		180 m (590 ft)	43	2011	Yeonsu District	
27	Eco Metro Apartment Complex 904		177 m (581 ft)	47	2011	Namdong District	
27	Songdo Campus Town 103		177 m (581 ft)	47	2016	Yeonsu District	
27	Songdo Campus Town 105		177 m (581 ft)	47	2016	Yeonsu District	
27	Songdo Campus Town 201		177 m (581 ft)	47	2016	Yeonsu District	
31	Songdo Central Park Prugio Tower I		175 m (574 ft)	46	2015	Yeonsu District	
31	Songdo Central Park Prugio Tower II		175 m (574 ft)	46	2015	Yeonsu District	
31	Songdo Central Park Prugio Tower III		175 m (574 ft)	46	2015	Yeonsu District	
34	Hakic Exllu Tower A		173 m (568 ft)	53	2010	Nam District	
34	Eco Metro Apartment Complex 3 The Tower C		173 m (568 ft)	46	2014	Namdong District	
34	Songdo Campus Town 106		173 m (568 ft)	47	2016	Yeonsu District	
34	Songdo Campus Town 202		173 m (568 ft)	46	2016	Yeonsu District	
38	Cheongna Lotte Castle Officetel		170 m (560 ft)	50	2012	Seo District	
38	Songdo Posco Central Park 1 Tower 1		170 m (560 ft)	47	2010	Yeonsu District	
38	Songdo Posco Central Park 1 Tower 2		170 m (560 ft)	47	2010	Yeonsu District	
38	Songdo Posco Central Park 1 Tower 3		170 m (560 ft)	47	2010	Yeonsu District	
38	Songdo Posco Central Park 2 Tower 1		170 m (560 ft)	49	2011	Yeonsu District	
38	Songdo Posco Central Park 2 Tower 2		170 m (560 ft)	49	2011	Yeonsu District	
38	Songdo Posco Central Park 2 Tower 3		170 m (560 ft)	49	2011	Yeonsu District	
45	Songdo Global Campus Daewoo Prugio 105		169 m (554 ft)	45	2013	Yeonsu District	
45	Songdo Global Campus Daewoo Prugio 106		169 m (554 ft)	45	2013	Yeonsu District	
45	Yonghyun Exllu Tower 102		169 m (554 ft)	45	2011	Nam District	
45	Yeonsu Daewoo Prugio Park View Tower B		169 m (554 ft)	40	2011	Yeonsu District	
45	Yeonsu Daewoo Prugio Park View Tower C		169 m (554 ft)	40	2011	Yeonsu District	
50	Hakic Exllu Tower B		165 m (541 ft)	46	2010	Nam District	
51	Lotte Mall Songdo Castle Park 1		163 m (535 ft)	41	2019	Yeonsu District	
51	Lotte Mall Songdo Castle Park 2		163 m (535 ft)	41	2019	Yeonsu District	
53	Incheon The Sharp Sky Tower 101		162 m (531 ft)	49	2020	Michuhol District	
53	Incheon The Sharp Sky Tower 103		162 m (531 ft)	49	2020	Michuhol District	
53	Incheon The Sharp Sky Tower 105		162 m (531 ft)	49	2020	Michuhol District	
53	Incheon The Sharp Sky Tower 107		162 m (531 ft)	49	2020	Michuhol District	
53	Incheon The Sharp Sky Tower 108		162 m (531 ft)	49	2020	Michuhol District	
53	Incheon The Sharp Sky Tower 201		162 m (531 ft)	49	2020	Michuhol District	
53	Incheon The Sharp Sky Tower 203		162 m (531 ft)	49	2020	Michuhol District	
53	Hillstate Songdo The Terrace 103		162 m (531 ft)	49	2020	Yeonsu District	
53	Hillstate Songdo The Terrace 104		162 m (531 ft)	49	2020	Yeonsu District	
53	Hillstate Songdo The Terrace 105		162 m (531 ft)	49	2020	Yeonsu District	
53	Hillstate Songdo The Terrace 107		162 m (531 ft)	49	2020	Yeonsu District	
53	Hillstate Songdo The Terrace 108		162 m (531 ft)	49	2020	Yeonsu District	
65	Yonghyun Exllu Tower 104		158 m (518 ft)	42	2011	Nam District	
65	Cheongna Lotte Castle Premium Town 103		158 m (518 ft)	47	2012	Seo District	
65	Cheongna Lotte Castle Premium Town 104		158 m (518 ft)	47	2012	Seo District	
65	Cheongna Lotte Castle Premium Town 105		158 m (518 ft)	47	2012	Seo District	
69	Cheongna Exllu Tower 3		157 m (515 ft)	45	2012	Seo District	
69	Songdo American Town I'Park Tower 101		157 m (515 ft)	49	2018	Yeonsu District	
69	Songdo American Town I'Park Tower 102		157 m (515 ft)	49	2018	Yeonsu District	
69	Songdo American Town I'Park Tower 103		157 m (515 ft)	49	2018	Yeonsu District	
73	Songdo Prugio Harbor View Tower A		155 m (509 ft)	42	2011	Yeonsu District	
73	Songdo Prugio Harbor View Tower B		155 m (509 ft)	42	2011	Yeonsu District	
73	Songdo International Business Square Tower		155 m (509 ft)	35	2013	Yeonsu District	
76	Songdo Global Campus Daewoo Prugio 104		154 m (505 ft)	41	2013	Yeonsu District	
77	Eco Metro Apartment Complex 1004		151 m (495 ft)	40	2010	Namdong District	
77	Eco Metro Apartment Complex 1005		151 m (495 ft)	40	2010	Namdong District	
77	Eco Metro Apartment Complex 505		151 m (495 ft)	40	2010	Namdong District	
77	Eco Metro Apartment Complex 903		151 m (495 ft)	40	2010	Namdong District	
77	Eco Metro Apartment Complex 906		151 m (495 ft)	40	2011	Namdong District	
82	Songdo Xi Harbour View Tower A		150 m (490 ft)	41	2010	Yeonsu District	
82	Songdo Xi Harbour View Tower B		150 m (490 ft)	41	2010	Yeonsu District	
82	Songdo Global Campus Daewoo Prugio 103		150 m (490 ft)	40	2013	Yeonsu District	
82	Songdo Global Campus Daewoo Prugio 107		150 m (490 ft)	40	2013	Yeonsu District	
82	Songdo G-Tower		150 m (490 ft)	33	2013	Yeonsu District	

== Tallest buildings under construction ==
This lists buildings that are under construction in Incheon and are planned to rise at least 150 m (490 ft). Buildings that have been topped out but are not completed are also included.

Name	Height m (ft)	Floors	Completion	District	Notes
Cheongna City Tower	448 m (1,470 ft)	26	2025	Seo District	Classified as a structure and not a building
Songdo American Town I'Park Tower 201	247 m (810 ft)	70	2025	Yeonsu District	
Hillstate Songdo The Sky 103	198 m (650 ft)	59	2025	Yeonsu District	Other buildings in project: 56 Fl, 51 Fl, 50 Fl, 49 Fl. Exact height of other buildings TBD
