= Seonhak station =

Metro station in Incheon, South Korea

I128 선학 Seonhak
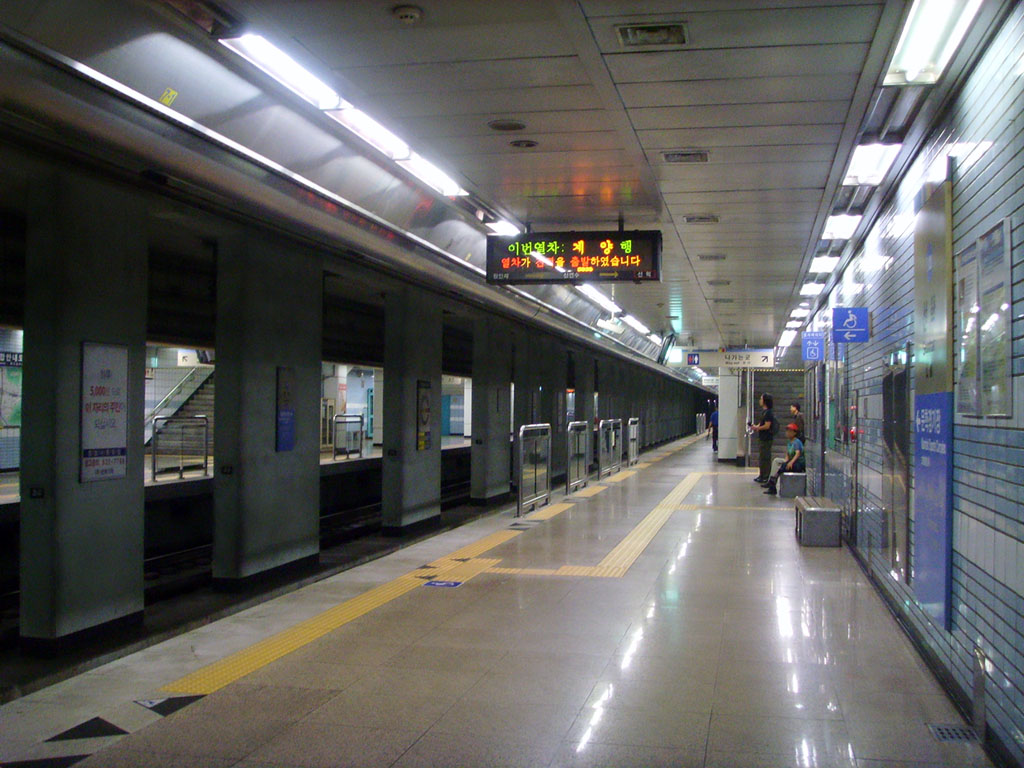

Korean name
- Hangul: 선학역
- Hanja: 仙鶴驛
- Revised Romanization: Seonhangnyeok
- McCune–Reischauer: Sŏnhangnyŏk

General information
- Location: 241-2 Seonhak-dong, Jiha480, Gyeongwon-daero, Yeonsu-gu, Incheon
- Coordinates: 37°25′37.22″N 126°41′56.32″E
- Operator: Incheon Transit Corporation
- Line: Incheon Line 1
- Platforms: 2
- Tracks: 2

Construction
- Structure type: Underground

Other information
- Station code: I128

History
- Opened: October 6, 1999

Passengers
- 2017: 14,009

Services
| Preceding station | Incheon Subway | Following station |
|---|---|---|
| Munhak Sports Complex towards Geomdan Lake Park | Incheon Line 1 | Sinyeonsu towards Songdo Moonlight Festival Park |
Location

Seonhak Station (Korean: 선학역; Hanja: 仙鶴驛) is a subway station on Line 1 of the Incheon Subway in Jiha480, Gyeongwon-daero, Yeonsu District, Incheon, South Korea.

== Station layout ==
| G | Street Level |
| L1 | Concourse | Faregates, Ticketing Machines, Station Control |
| L2; Platforms | Side platform, doors will open on the right |
| L2; Platforms | Westbound | ← Incheon Line 1 toward Geomdan Lake Park (Munhak Sports Complex) |
| L2; Platforms | Eastbound | → Incheon Line 1 toward Songdo Moonlight Festival Park (Sinyeonsu) → |
| L2; Platforms | Side platform, doors will open on the right |

== Exits ==
| Exit No. | Image | Destinations |
|---|---|---|
| 1 | | Geumho apartment |
| 2 | | Seonhak elementary school Seonhak-dong office Seonhak middle school |
| 3 | | Yeonsu Hospital |
| 4 | | Yoonseong apartment |
