= Munhak Sports Complex station =

Metro station in Incheon, South Korea

I127 문학경기장 (그랜드오스티엄 웨딩컨벤션) Munhak Sports Complex (Grand Ostium Wedding Convention)
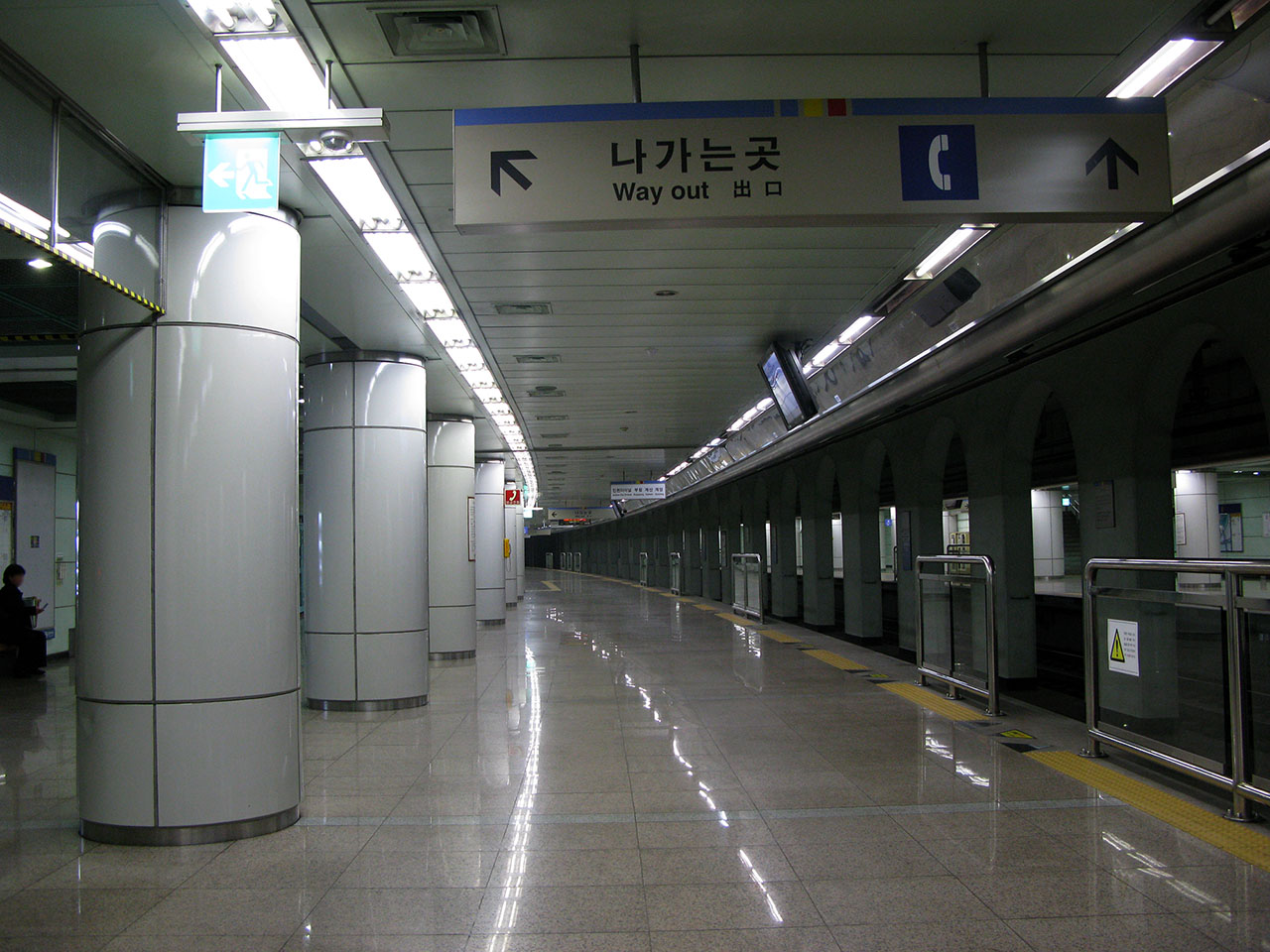

Korean name
- Hangul: 문학경기장역
- Hanja: 文鶴競技場驛
- Revised Romanization: Munhakgyeonggijangyeok
- McCune–Reischauer: Munhakkyŏnggijangyŏk

General information
- Location: 117-1 Seonhak-dong, Jiha2, Yesullo, Yeonsu-gu, Incheon
- Coordinates: 37°26′5.59″N 126°41′52.27″E
- Operator: Incheon Transit Corporation
- Line: Incheon Line 1
- Platforms: 2
- Tracks: 2

Construction
- Structure type: Underground

Other information
- Station code: I127

History
- Opened: October 6, 1999

Passengers
- 2017: 4,343

Services
Preceding station	Incheon Subway	Following station
Incheon Bus Terminal towards Geomdan Lake Park	Incheon Line 1	Seonhak towards Songdo Moonlight Festival Park
Location

Munhak Sports Complex Station is a subway station on Line 1 of the Incheon Subway in Yeonsu District, Incheon, South Korea.

== Station layout ==
G	Street Level
L1	Concourse	Faregates, Ticketing Machines, Station Control
L2; Platforms	Side platform, doors will open on the right
L2; Platforms	Westbound	← Incheon Line 1 toward Geomdan Lake Park (Incheon Bus Terminal)
L2; Platforms	Eastbound	→ Incheon Line 1 toward Songdo Moonlight Festival Park (Seonhak) →
L2; Platforms	Side platform, doors will open on the right

== Exits ==
Exit No.	Image	Destinations
1		Seonhak-dong
2		Munhak Sports Complex; Children's museum Munhak Information high school
