= UNESCAP East and North-East Asia Office =

United Nations organization

UNESCAP-ENEA
- Abbreviation: UNESCAP-ENEA
- Formation: 17 May 2010 in Incheon, South Korea
- Legal status: Active
- Website: enea.unescap.org

Chinese name
- Simplified Chinese: 联合国亚太经社会东亚和东北亚办事处
- Hanyu Pinyin: Liánhéguó Yàtài Jīngshèhuì Dōngyà hé Dōngběiyà Bànshìchù

Korean name
- Hangul: 유엔 아시아태평양경제사회위원회 동북아사무소
- Hanja: 유엔 아시아太平洋經濟社會委員會東北亞事務所
- Revised Romanization: Yuen Asia Taepyeong-yang Gyeongje Sahoe Wiwonhoe Dongbuga Samuso

Mongolian name
- Mongolian Cyrillic: Нэгдсэн Үндэстний Байгууллагын АНДЭЗНК Зүүн ба Зүүн Хойд Азийн салбар

Japanese name
- Kanji: 国連アジア太平洋経済社会委員会北東アジア事務所
- Romanization: Kokuren Ajia Taiheiyō Keizai Shakai Iinkai Hokutō Ajia Jimusho

Russian name
- Russian: Организация Объединённых Наций ЭСКАТО Северная и Северо-Восточная Азия
- Romanization: Organizatsiya Ob'yedinyonnykh Natsiy ESKATO Severnaya i Severo-Vostochnaya Aziya

The Economic and Social Commission for Asia and the Pacific (UNESCAP or ESCAP), East and North-East Asia Office was inaugurated on 17 May 2010 in Incheon, South Korea. Since its establishment, the Office has been working closely with six member States and two associate members to build and strengthen partnerships and cooperation for inclusive and sustainable development in the subregion.

It also serves as the Secretariat of the North-East Asian Subregional Programme for Environmental Cooperation (NEASPEC) which was launched in 1993 by the same six member States as a subregional follow-up of the United Nations Conference on Environment and Development (UNCED, Rio Conference or Earth Summit) in 1992.

== Background ==
Three new ESCAP Subregional Offices were established during 2010-2011 for East and North-East Asia, North and Central Asia, and South and South-West Asia by the UN General Assembly resolution on development-related activities (63/260). The resolution was adopted pursuant to the UN Secretary-General's report (A/62/708) on improving the effective and efficient delivery of the mandates of development-related activities. The report highlighted the need for strengthening programme implementation at the subregional levels, facilitating subregional linkages and policy dialogue, and promoting specific subregional priorities.

== Key areas of work ==
Under the overall mandate to support regional economic cooperation and integration and the achievement of the Sustainable Development Goals (SDGs), the Office carries out the following work:

1. Addressing Social Challenges through Science, Technology and Innovation

- Knowledge-Sharing Platform for Sustainable Ageing Societies
- Youth Innovation for SDGs
- SDGs Monitoring and Implementation using Big Data

2. Strengthening Intraregional Connectivity

- Trade and Transport, in particular, with Mongolia
- International Road Transport Agreement between China, Mongolia, and the Russian Federation
- Policy Consultation and Knowledge Sharing on Cross-Border Trade Facilitation

3. Facilitating Development Cooperation

- North-East Asia Development Cooperation Forum
- Green Technology Facilitation

4. Promoting Disaster Resilient Societies

- Capacity Building for Drought Monitoring and Early Warning in Mongolia
- Disaster-related Statistics and Data

5. Improving Environmental Sustainability through NEASPEC*

- Air Pollution*
- Desertification and Land Degradation*
- Biodiversity and Nature Conservation*
- North-East Asian Marine Protected Areas Network (NEAMPAN)*
- North-East Asia Low Carbon City Platform (NEA-LCCP)*

== Member states ==
- South Korea
- China
- Japan
- North Korea
- Mongolia
- Russia

== Associate members ==
- Hong Kong
- Macau

== Location ==
Located in G-Tower, Incheon, South Korea.

== See also ==
- United Nations Economic and Social Commission for Asia and the Pacific
