= Sinyeonsu station =

Metro station in Incheon, South Korea

I129 신연수 (가천대학교 메디컬캠퍼스) Sinyeonsu (Gachon Univ. Medical Campus)
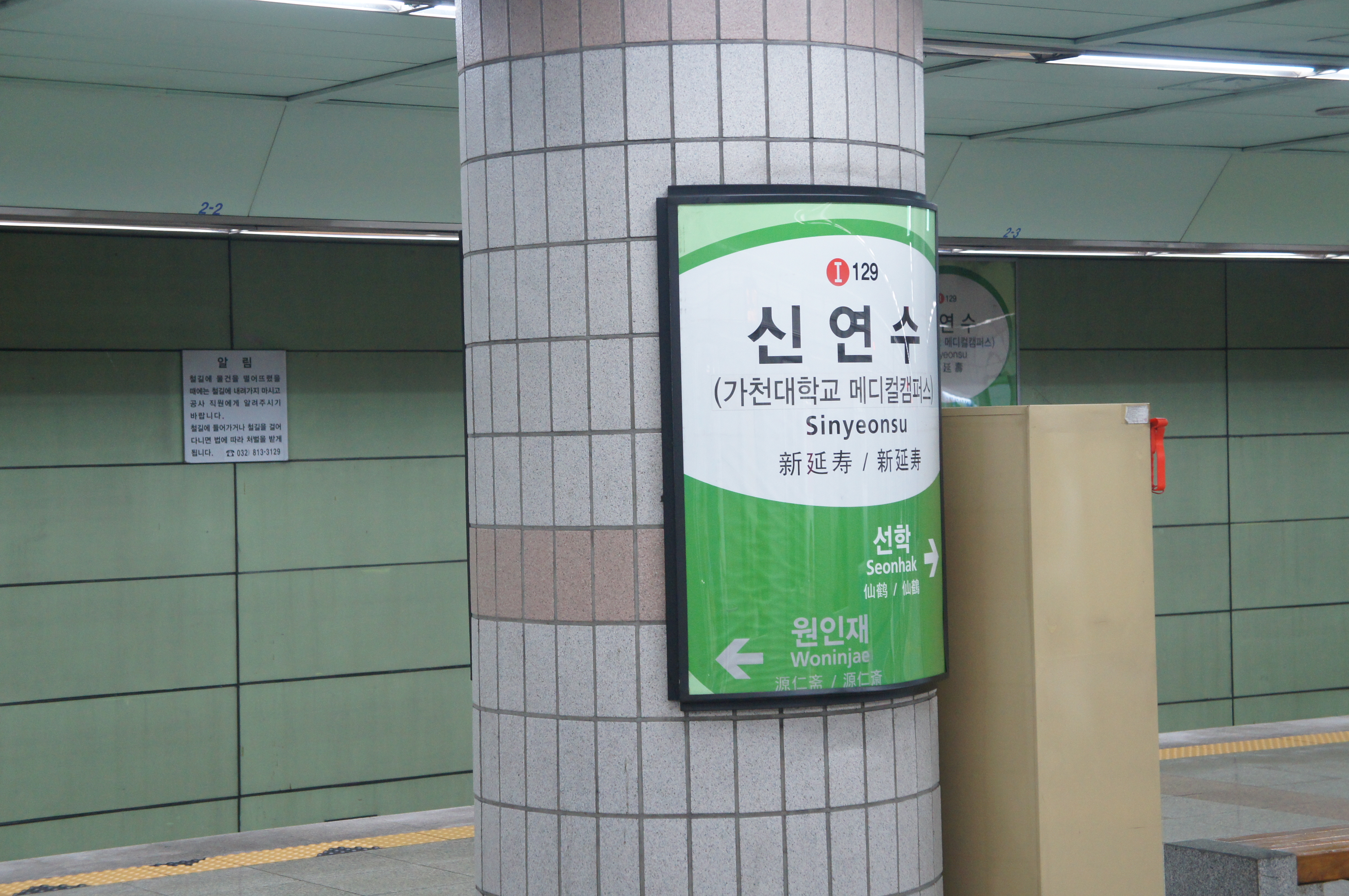

Korean name
- Hangul: 신연수역
- Hanja: 新延壽驛
- Revised Romanization: Sinnyeonsuyeok
- McCune–Reischauer: Sinnyŏnsuyŏk

General information
- Location: 384 Seonhak-dong, Jiha368, Gyeongwon-daero, Yeonsu-gu, Incheon
- Coordinates: 37°25′4.95″N 126°41′38.15″E
- Operator: Incheon Transit Corporation
- Line: Incheon Line 1
- Platforms: 1
- Tracks: 2

Construction
- Structure type: Underground

Other information
- Station code: I129

History
- Opened: October 6, 1999

Passengers
- 2017: 11,059

Services
Preceding station	Incheon Subway	Following station
Seonhak towards Geomdan Lake Park	Incheon Line 1	Woninjae towards Songdo Moonlight Festival Park
Location

Sinyeonsu Station (Korean: 신연수역; Hanja: 新延壽驛) is a subway station on Line 1 of the Incheon Subway in Gyeongwon-daero, Yeonsu District, Incheon, South Korea.

== Station layout ==
G	Street Level	Exits
L1	Concourse	Faregates, Ticketing Machines, Station Control
L2; Platforms	Westbound	← Incheon Line 1 toward Geomdan Lake Park (Seonhak)
L2; Platforms	Island platform, doors will open on the left
L2; Platforms	Eastbound	→ Incheon Line 1 toward Songdo Moonlight Festival Park (Woninjae) →

== Exits ==
Exit No.	Image	Destinations
1		Seonhak middle school Namdong national industrial complex
2		Namdong national industrial complex
3		Red cross hospital Incheon Yeonil school Incheon post office Yeonsu public library Yeonsu middle school
4		Yeonsu elementary school Incheon girls' high school Gacheon medical college Incheon middle school
