= Arts Center Station =

Arts Center Station may refer to:

- Culture & Arts Center station (Incheon Subway), South Korea
- Arts Center station (MARTA), in Atlanta, Georgia, US
- Neiwei Arts Center light rail station on the Circular light rail in Kaohsiung, Taiwan

== See also ==
- Arts Centre (disambiguation)
