= Arts Centre (disambiguation) =

Arts Centre or Art Centre or variants may refer to:

- Arts centre, a community centre specialising in the arts, including a list of arts centres
- ArtCenter College of Design, in Pasadena, California, US
- Arts Center Station (disambiguation)
