= Incheon Bus Terminal station =

Metro station in Incheon, South Korea

Coordinates: 37.44224°N 126.69964°E

I126 인천터미널 (푸른세상안과) Incheon Bus Terminal (Blue World Eye Clinic)
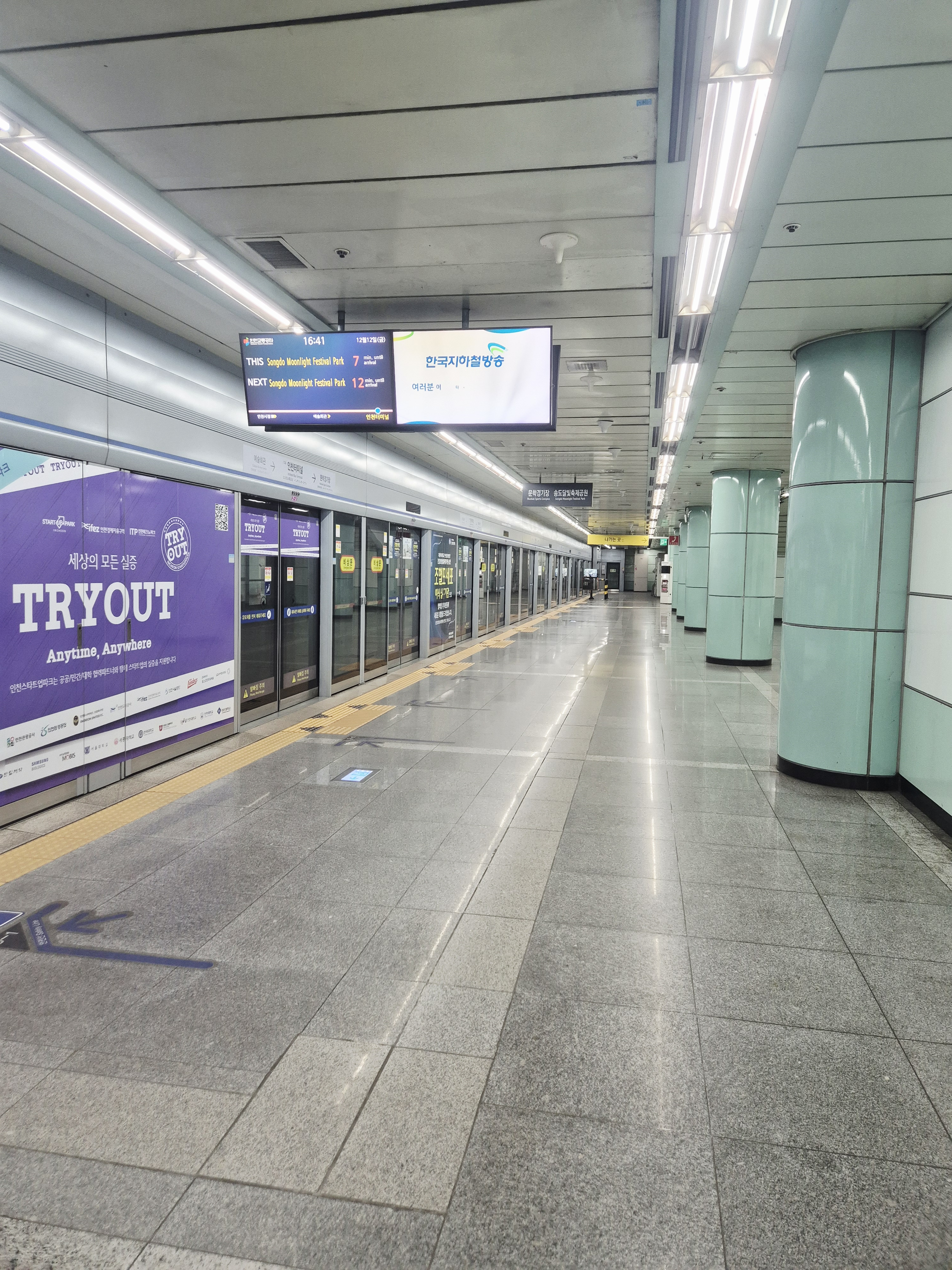

Korean name
- Hangul: 인천터미널역
- Hanja: 仁川터미널驛
- Revised Romanization: Incheon-teomineol-lyeok
- McCune–Reischauer: Inch'ŏn-t'ŏminŏl-lyŏk

General information
- Location: 14 Gwangyo-dong, Michuhol-gu, Incheon
- Operator: Incheon Transit Corporation
- Line: Incheon Line 1
- Platforms: 2
- Tracks: 2

Construction
- Structure type: Underground

Other information
- Station code: I126

History
- Opened: October 6, 1999

Passengers
- 2017: 37,360

Services
Preceding station	Incheon Subway	Following station
Culture & Arts Center towards Geomdan Lake Park	Incheon Line 1	Munhak Sports Complex towards Songdo Moonlight Festival Park
Location

Incheon Bus Terminal Station (Korean: 인천터미널역; Hanja: 仁川터미널驛) is a subway station on Line 1 of the Incheon Subway located at 14 Gwangyo-dong, Nam-gu, Incheon, South Korea.

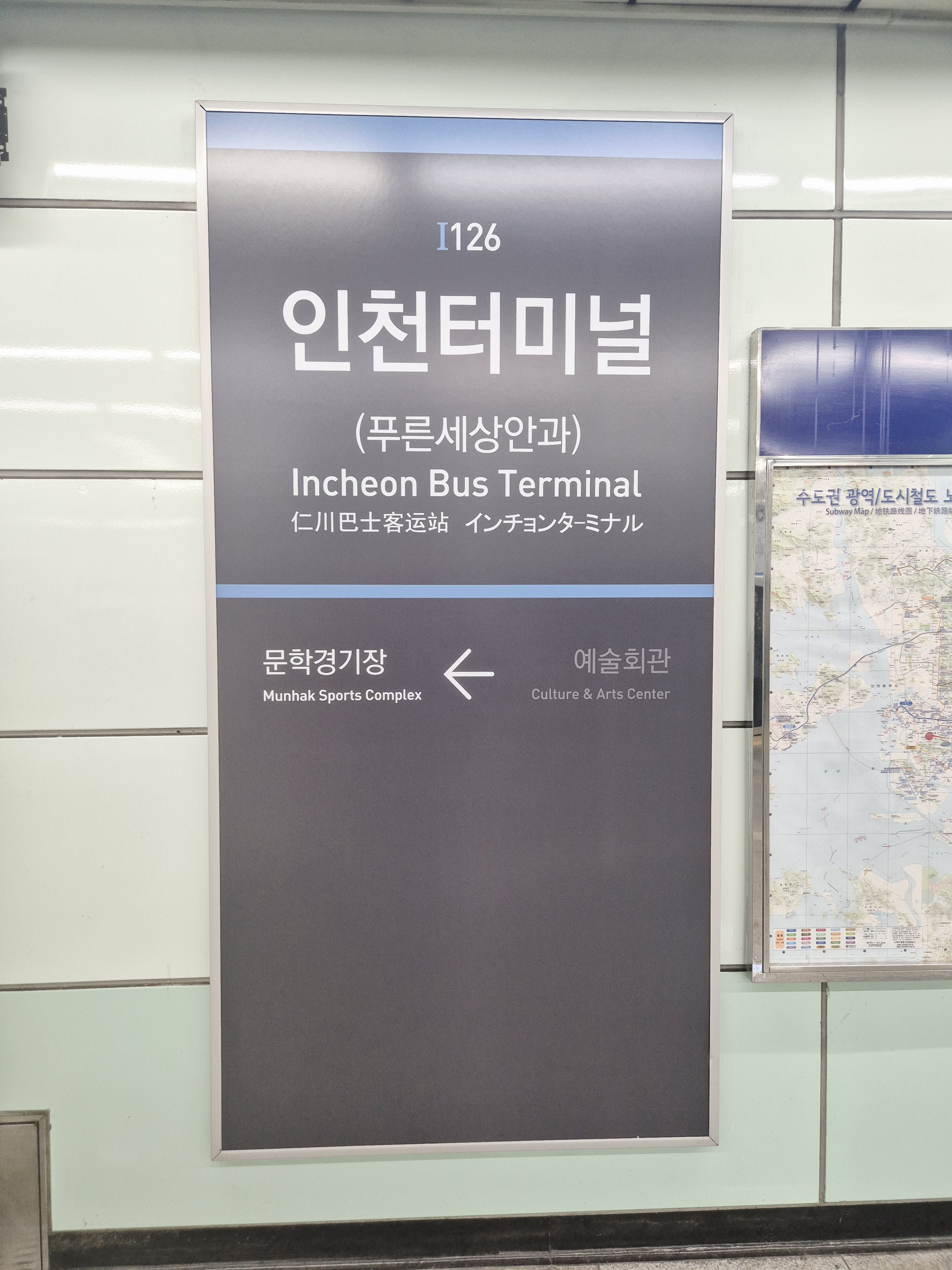

== Station layout ==
G	Street Level
L1	Concourse	Faregates, Ticketing Machines, Station Control
L2; Platforms	Side platform, doors will open on the right
L2; Platforms	Westbound	← Incheon Line 1 toward Geomdan Lake Park (Culture & Arts Center)
L2; Platforms	Eastbound	→ Incheon Line 1 toward Songdo Moonlight Festival Park (Munhak Sports Complex) →
L2; Platforms	Side platform, doors will open on the right

== Exits ==
Exit No.	Image	Destinations
1		Jungang park
2		Sinsegye department store Namdong police office Newcore Outlet; Kyobo books
3		Incheon Bus Terminal
5		Eorinyi Gyotong park Seunghak elementary school Inmyeong girls' high school
6		Gwangyo middle school Gwangyo elementary school Nam Incheon girls' middle school Gwangyo-dong office
