= Hambak Village =

Ethnic enclave in Incheon, South Korea

- Neighborhood
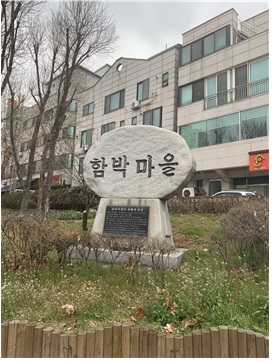
- Sign for the neighborhood (2019)
- Interactive map of Hambak Village
- Coordinates: 37°25′32″N 126°40′58″E
- Country: South Korea
- City: Incheon
- District: Yeonsu

Population (2023)
  - Total: 12,000

Hambak Village (Korean: 함박마을; Russian: Хамбак маыль) is a neighborhood in Yeonsu District, Incheon, South Korea. It is home to a significant foreign population, and has been called "Russia Town".

== Description ==
In September 2023, it was reported that 7,400 of 12,000 residents (61.1%) were foreign nationals. Of them, 3,693 are Koryo-saram: ethnic Koreans of the former Soviet Union. There are also 2,135 Kazakhstanis, 1,829 Uzbekistanis, and 260 Kyrgyzstanis. Two elementary schools in the area have more foreign than domestic students.

Its residents come from a variety of countries, including Vietnam, China, Russia, Kazakhstan, and Uzbekistan. The cost of living in the area is lower than the surrounding areas and it is in close proximity to Incheon International Airport, which has made it an attractive area for immigrants. Much of the signage in the area is written in Cyrllic script.

The area primarily serves lower income residents. The neighborhood has been juxtaposted with the nearby Songdo smart city, which has an advanced underground waste management system and a high cost of living.

== History ==
The area had previously been an enclave for Koryo-saram. Word spread that the area was a good place for Russian speakers to settle, and thus a large number of workers from Central Asia began arriving in the area beginning in the late 2010s.

The area has been described as having a consistent issue with littering. Although CCTV cameras were installed to catch violators, violators instead reportedly learned to avoid being seen by the cameras. In addition, Koreans have alleged that foreign residents have committed a number of crimes. This has caused significant friction between Korean and non-Korean residents in the area, and many Koreans have since left. In June 2023, it was reported that 70 of the 120 restaurants in the area were run by foreigners.

It was reported in 2023 that Yeonsu District was planning a solution for improving relations between foreign and domestic residents. It planned to hold community events, establish a community center, remodel the commercial district, and provide language services and schooling. It also planned to escalate monitoring of illegal trash disposal. Part of the motivation for the community events and language services was to help increase exposure between the groups, in order to promote friendlier relations.
