= Yeonsu Girls' High School =

School in Yeonsu District, South Korea

Coordinates: 37.410880°N 126.671784°E

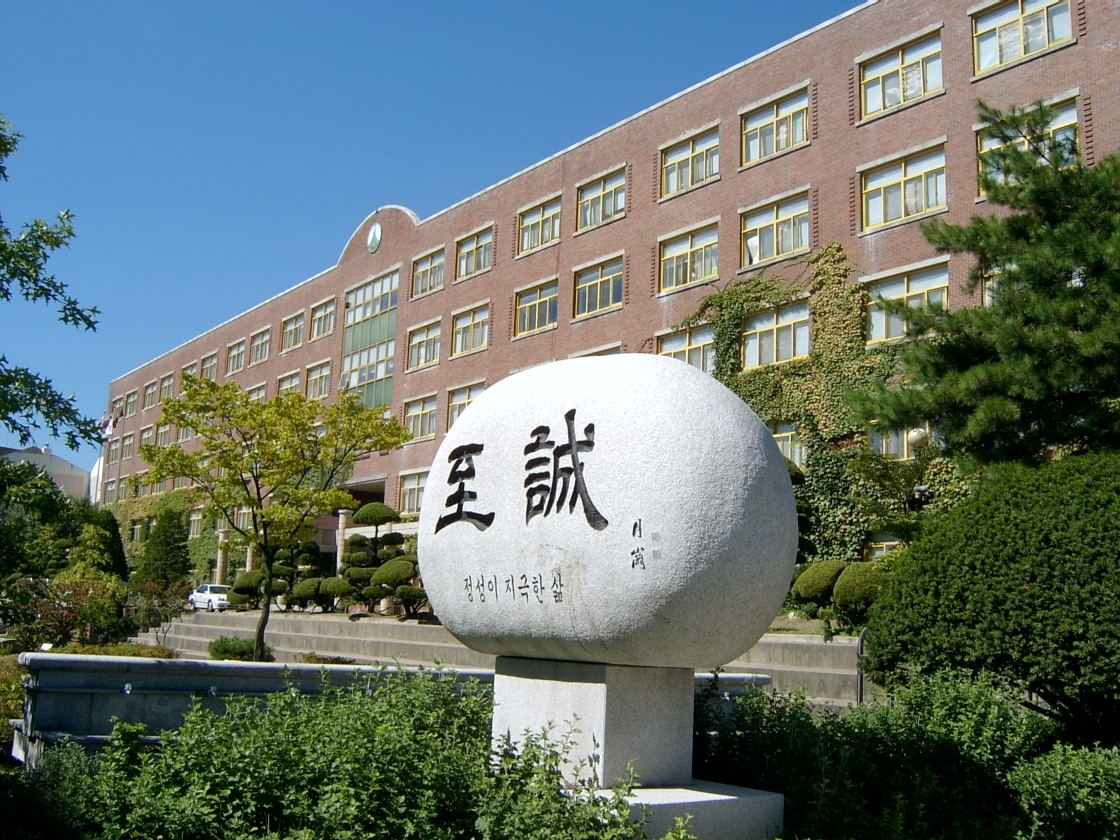
Main entrance from Meonugeum-ro

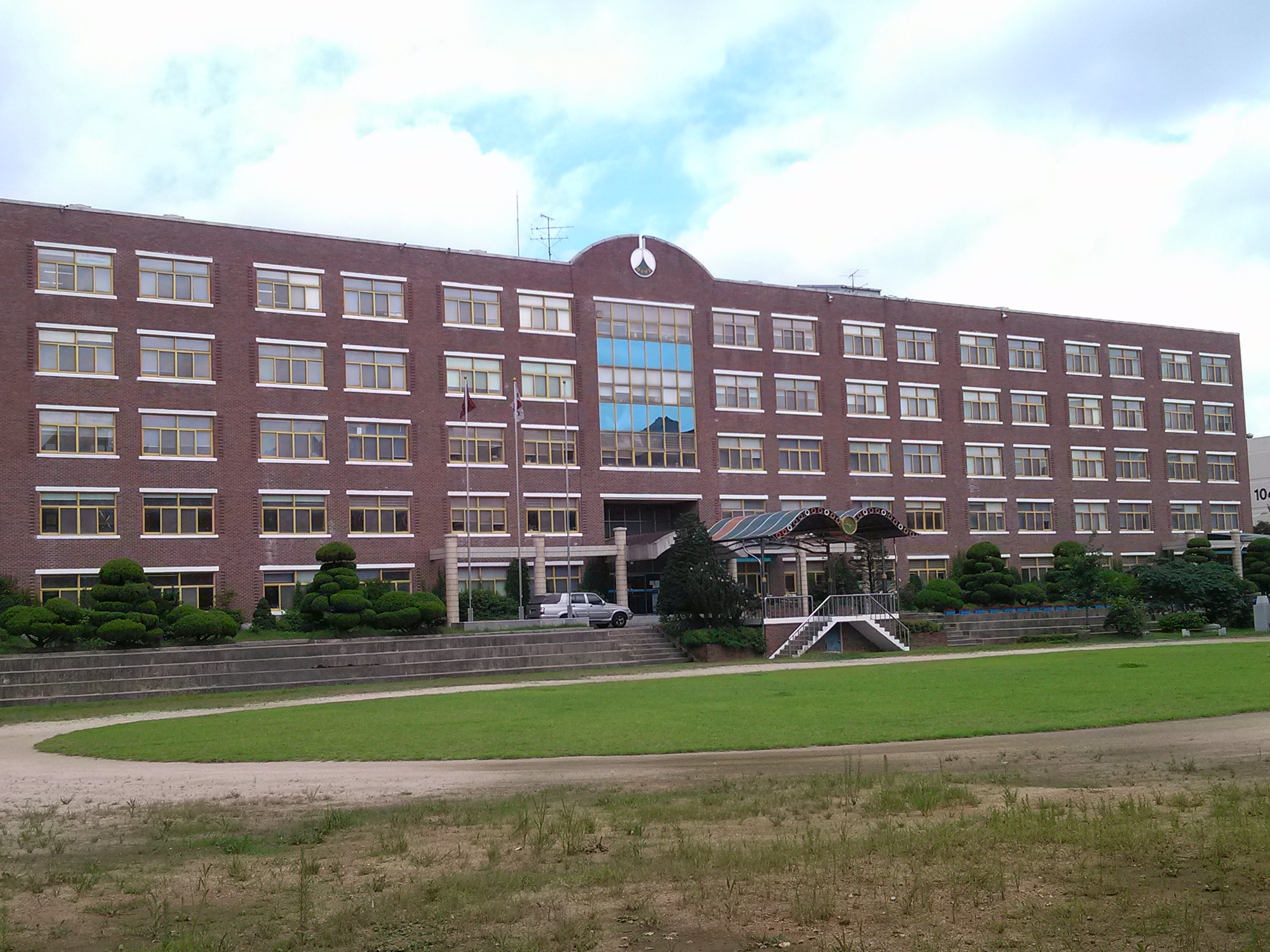
Side view of the school

Yeonsu Girls' High School (연수 여자 고등학교) is a Korean high school located in the Yeonsu District, within the Incheon metropolitan area. The school has over 1000 students and 70 teachers. The school is located at 9 Meonugeum-ro 141beon-gil, Yeonsu-gu, Incheon.
