= Incheon Catholic University =

Coordinates: 37.65749°N 126.44717°E

- 인천가톨릭대학교
- Type: Private
- Established: 1996
- Academic staff: 19
- Students: 177
- Location: Incheon, Ganghwa County
- Website: www.iccu.ac.kr

- Incheon Catholic University
- Hangul: 인천가톨릭대학교
- Hanja: 仁川가톨릭大學校
- RR: Incheon Gatollik daehakgyo
- MR: Inch'ŏn Kat'ollik taehakkyo

Incheon Catholic University (Korean: 인천가톨릭대학교) is a private university located in the Yeonsu District of Incheon, South Korea.

Incheon Catholic University was founded in March 1996 with 40 students in the theology department. Choi Ki-bok was the first president. In 1997, he established the Korean Institute for Culture and the Asian Evangelization Research Institute.

As of 2015, the faculty was divided into the theological college (Theology Department), the formative arts university (Painting Department, Environmental Sculpture Department, Visual Design Department, and Environmental Design Department), and the college (Nursing Department). The graduate school consists of a general graduate school and special graduate school.
