= Culture & Arts Center station (Incheon Subway) =

Metro station in Incheon, South Korea

I125 예술회관 (대찬병원) Culture & Arts Center (Daechan Hospital)
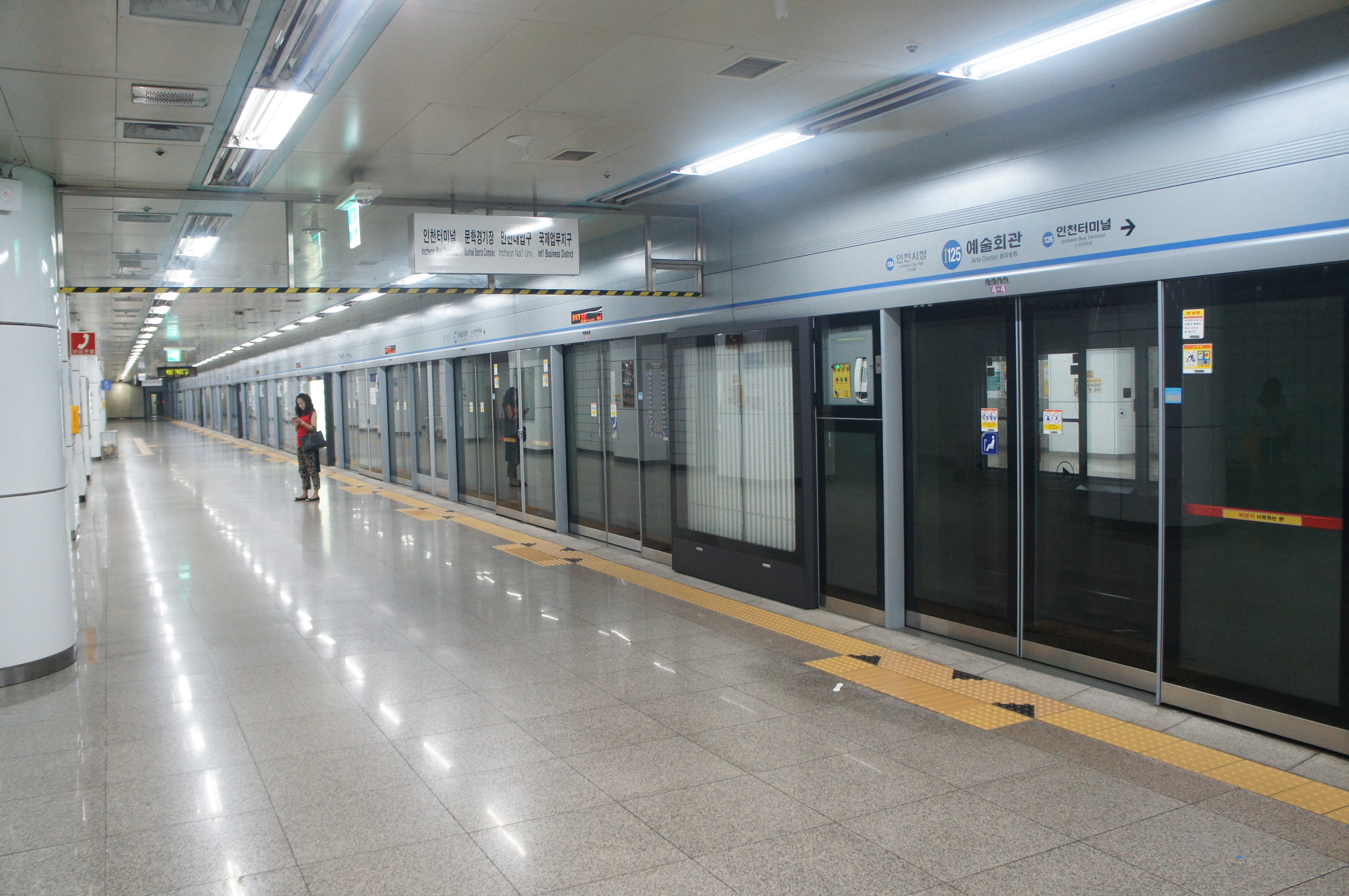

Korean name
- Hangul: 예술회관역
- Hanja: 藝術會館驛
- Revised Romanization: Yesulhoegwan-yeok
- McCune–Reischauer: Yesurhoegwan-yŏk

General information
- Location: 1408 Guwol-dong, Jiha172, Yesul-ro, Namdong-gu, Incheon
- Coordinates: 37°26′58″N 126°42′04″E
- Operator: Incheon Transit Corporation
- Line: Incheon Line 1
- Platforms: 2
- Tracks: 2

Construction
- Structure type: Underground

Other information
- Station code: I125

History
- Opened: October 6, 1999

Passengers
- 2017: 26,508

Services
Preceding station	Incheon Subway	Following station
Incheon City Hall towards Geomdan Lake Park	Incheon Line 1	Incheon Bus Terminal towards Songdo Moonlight Festival Park
Location

Culture & Arts Center Station, formerly Arts Center Station, is a subway station on Line 1 of the Incheon Subway. It is located next to the Incheon Culture & Arts Center and the Incheon Olympic Park in the Incheon Bus Terminal area of central Incheon.

== Station layout ==
G	Street Level
L1	Concourse	Faregates, Ticketing Machines, Station Control
L2; Platforms	Side platform, doors will open on the right
L2; Platforms	Westbound	← Incheon Line 1 toward Geomdan Lake Park (Incheon City Hall)
L2; Platforms	Eastbound	→ Incheon Line 1 toward Songdo Moonlight Festival Park (Incheon Bus Terminal) →
L2; Platforms	Side platform, doors will open on the right

== Exits ==
Exit No.	Image	Destinations
1		CGV; Homeplus
2		Citibank Korea
3		Guwol Girls' Middle School
4		Heunggook Life Insurance
5		Lotte Department Store; Incheon Regional Police Office
6		Arts Center
7		Arts Center
8		Olympics Park
9		Guwol-dong Post Office; Olympic Park
10		Gyeongin Regional Labor Office; Jungang Park
11		Jungang Park
