= National Museum of World Writing Systems =

Coordinates: 37.3947°N 126.6380°E

- 국립세계문자박물관
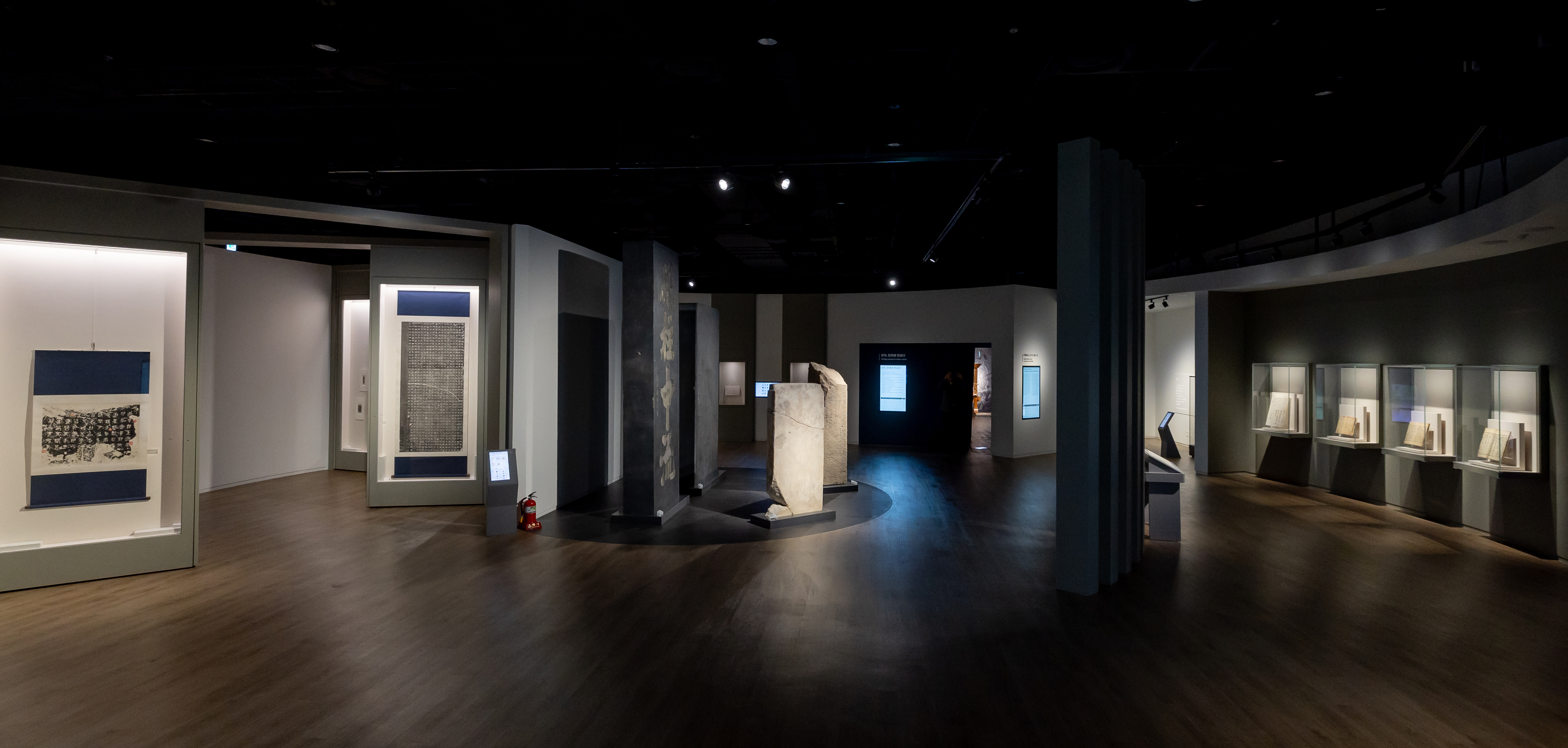
- Established: 29 June 2023
- Location: Incheon, South Korea
- Type: History museum

The National Museum of World Writing Systems (Korean: 국립세계문자박물관) is a museum on writing systems located in Songdo-dong, Yeonsu District, Incheon, South Korea. Construction began in 2019, and the museum was opened in 2023.

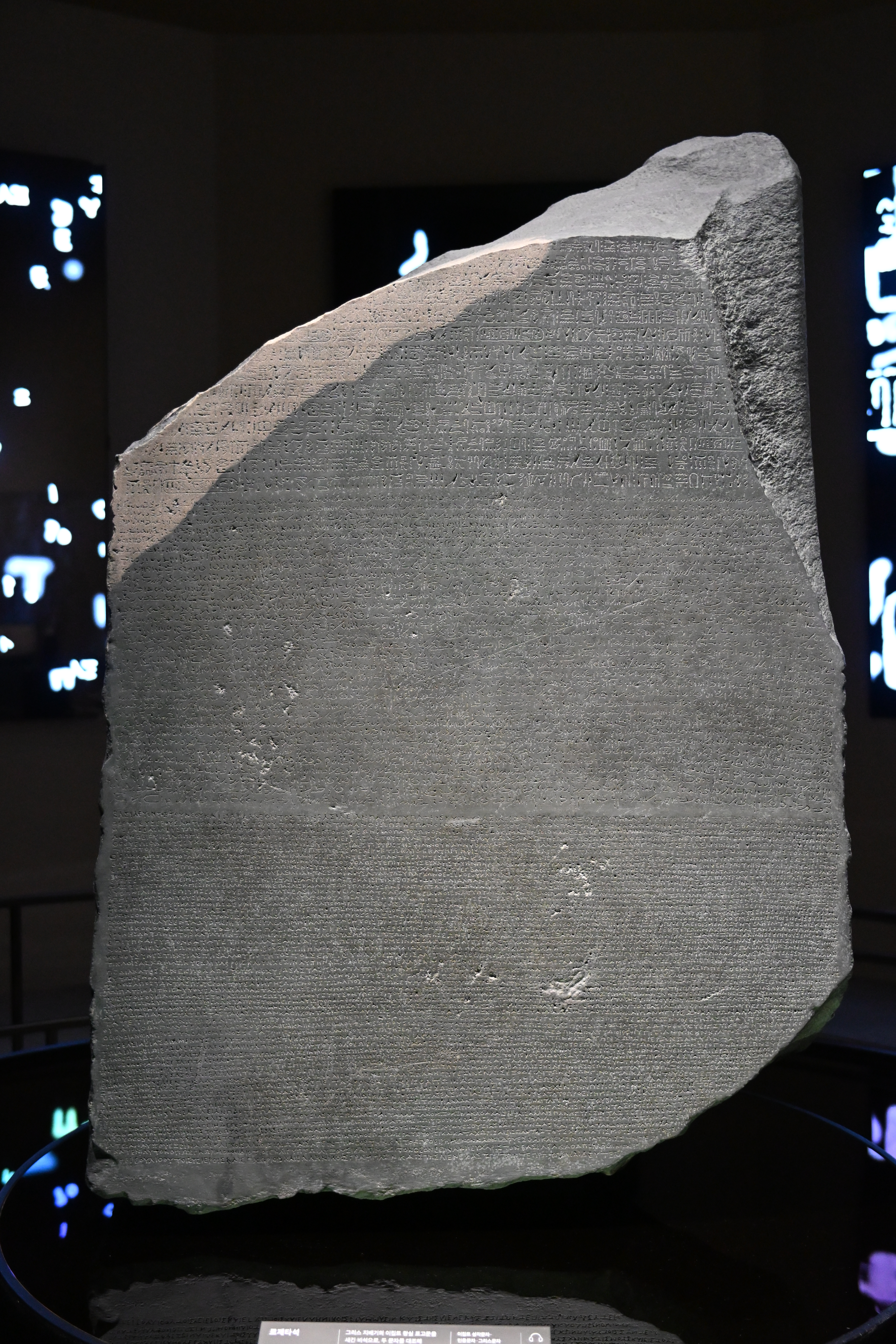
Rosetta Stone replica

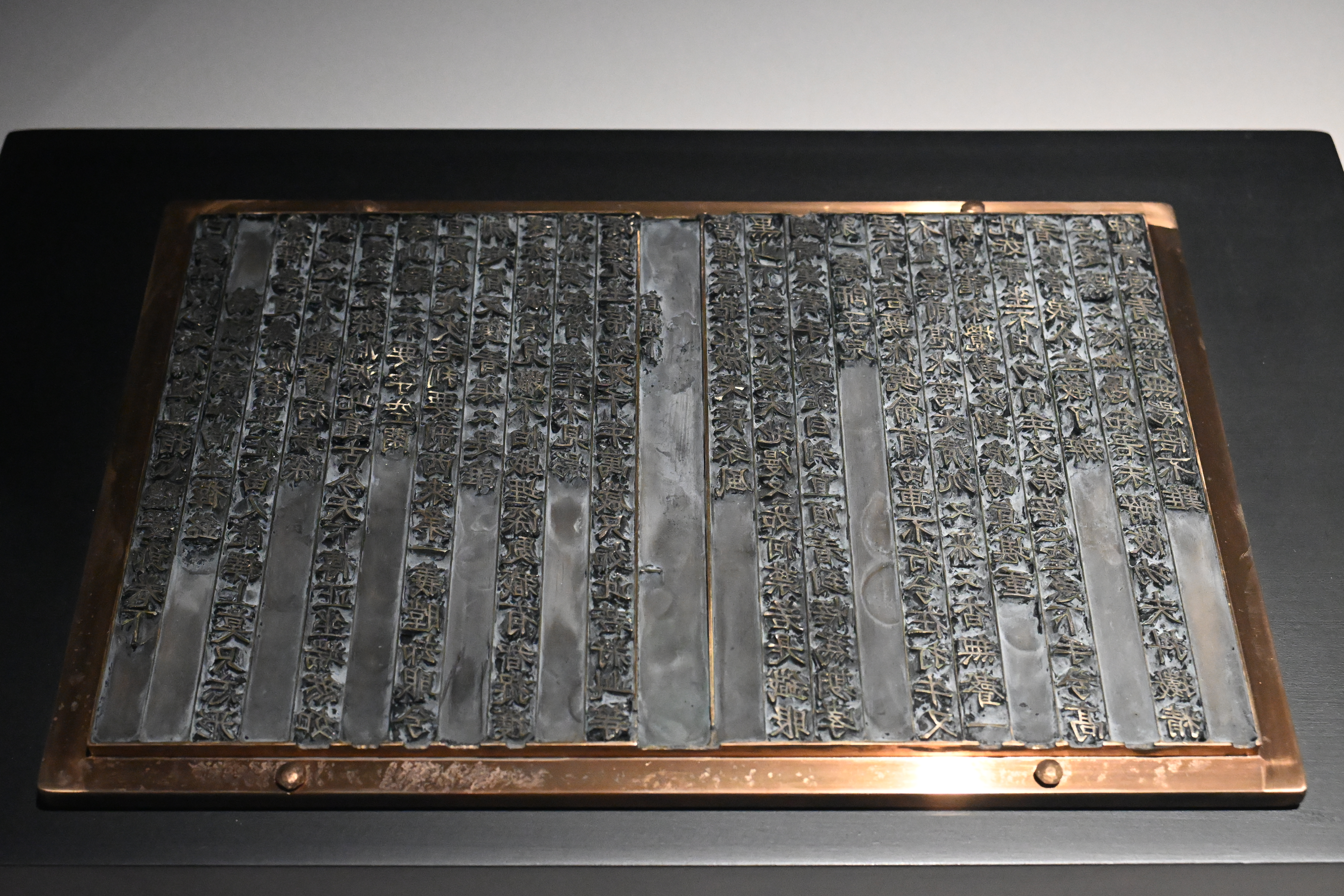
Replica metal print plate of Jikji Simche Yojeol

The permanent collection compares the development of 55 different language scripts around the world. Examples of scripts include cuneiform, Egyptian hieroglyphs, and Korean Hangul. At its opening, the museum contained artifacts such as ancient Akkadian cuneiform tablets from Southwest Asia dating between 2,000 BC and 1,600 BC and a Johannes Gutenberg 42-line bible. Explanations in the museum are available to visitors in 9 different languages.
