= Songdo The Sharp First World =

Residential project in Songdo IBD, South Korea

Songdo First World
- 송도더샵퍼스트월드
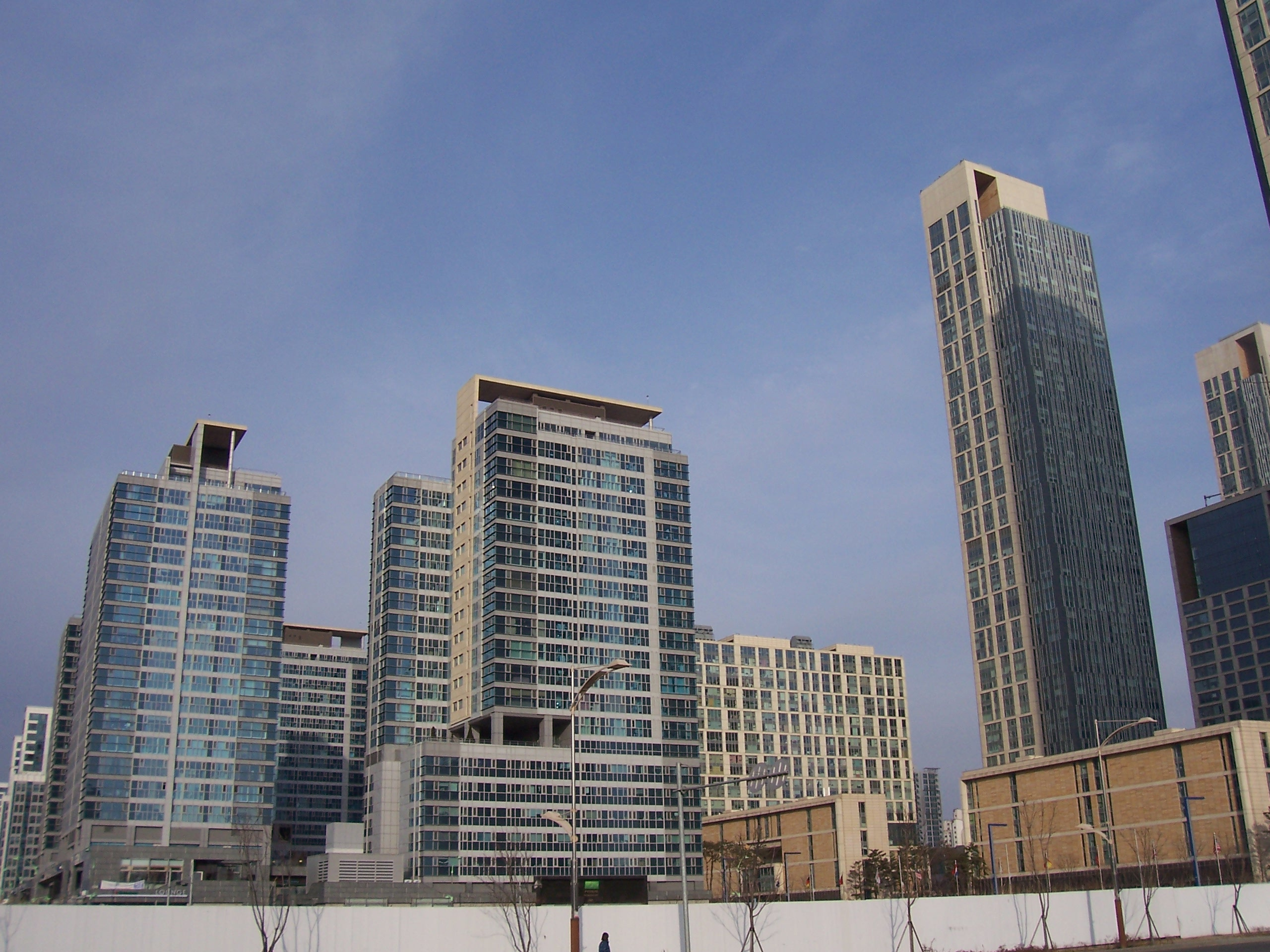
- First World, March 2012
- Interactive map of the Songdo First World area

General information
- Status: Completed
- Type: Mixed-use, residential
- Location: Songdo IBD; Songdo International City, Incheon Free Economic Zone, Incheon; South Korea
- Coordinates: 37°23′28.28″N 126°38′54.72″E
- Estimated completion: April 2009

Technical details
- Floor count: 3 FL to 64 FL
- Floor area: 5.7 million sf, 2685 units

Design and construction
- Architect: KPF / BAUM
- Developer: Gale International, POSCO E&C

Songdo First World is the first completed residential project in Songdo IBD, South Korea. There are four buildings, each with 65 floors. Featuring over 2,500 residential and workspace units within the complex, this luxury building was designed by Kohn Pedersen Fox (KPF) and BAUM. It is located adjacent to the Songdo convensia, Northeast Asia Trade Tower and the subway station.

== See also ==
- List of tallest buildings in Incheon
- List of tallest buildings in South Korea
