= Incheon Bus Terminal =

Bus station in Incheon, South Korea

Coordinates: 37°26′30″N 126°42′05″E

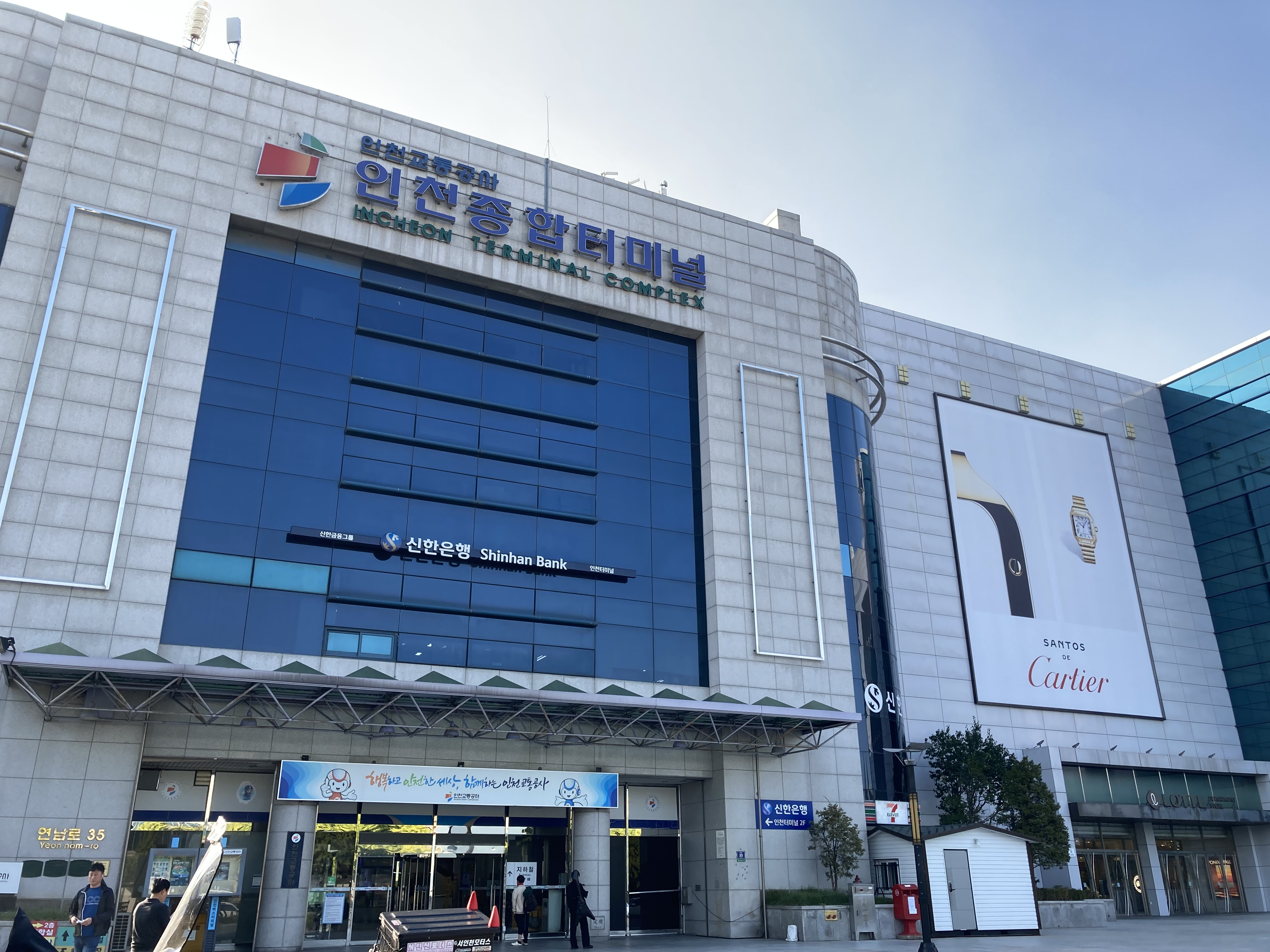
Incheon Bus Terminal

Incheon Bus Terminal, not far from Incheon City Hall, is the busiest bus station in Incheon, South Korea and the main gateway for intranational buses connecting Incheon city. It is operated by Incheon Transit Corporation which was founded by the city government.

The terminal serves national routes operated by companies such as Samhwa Express, as well as local and intercity buses.

The eponymous subway station of Incheon Subway line 1 (Incheon Bus Terminal Station) and a Lotte department store are located by the terminal. The area in front of the terminal is one of the most congested in Incheon.

== Arounds ==
Nearby are Incheon Terminal Station Line 1, Lotte Department Store, and Lotte Mart, and there is a movie theater (Lotte Cinema). There is Rodeo Street in Guwol-dong, a nearby busy street.

== Photos ==
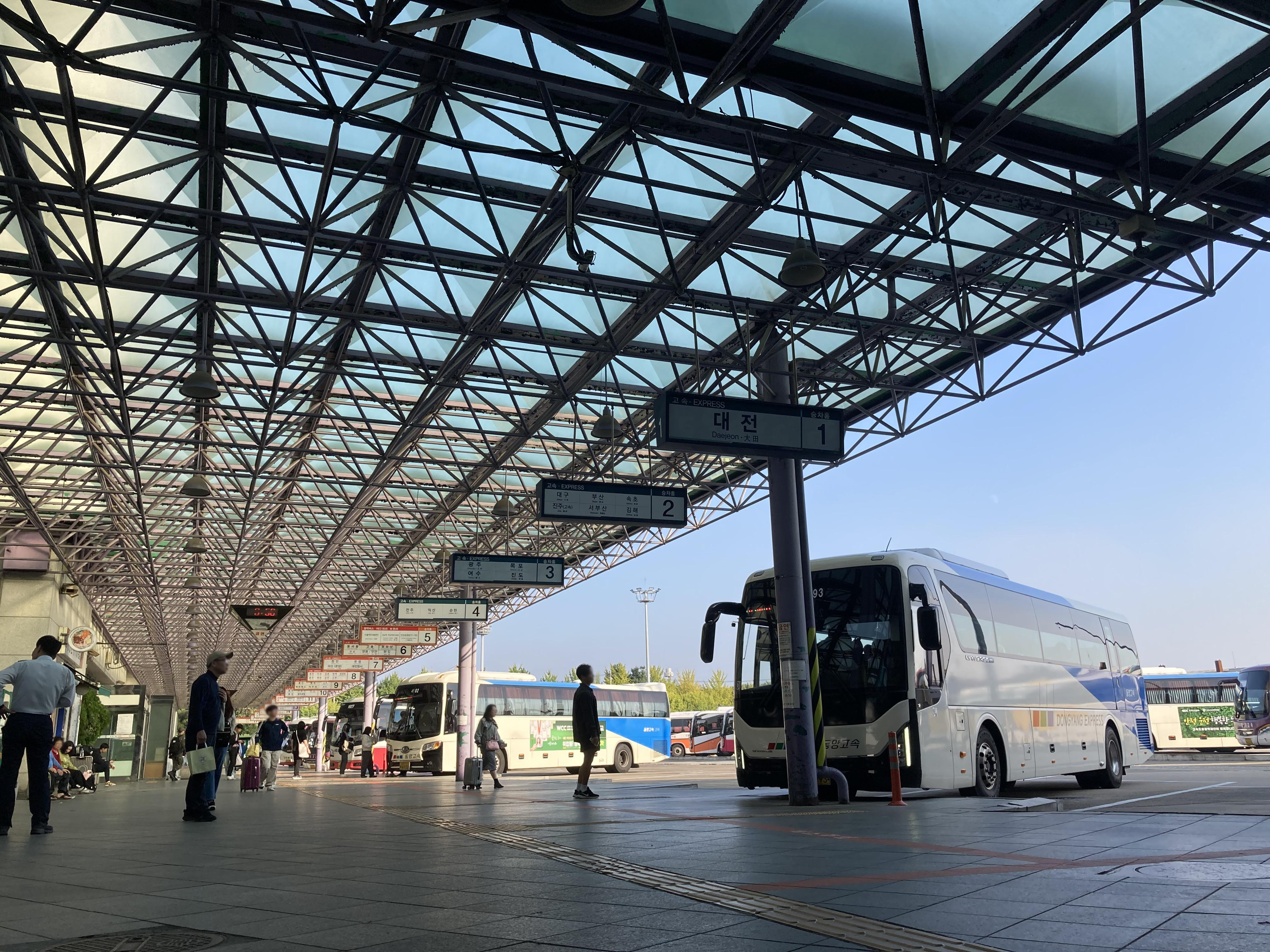
Bus Terminal Departure Platform

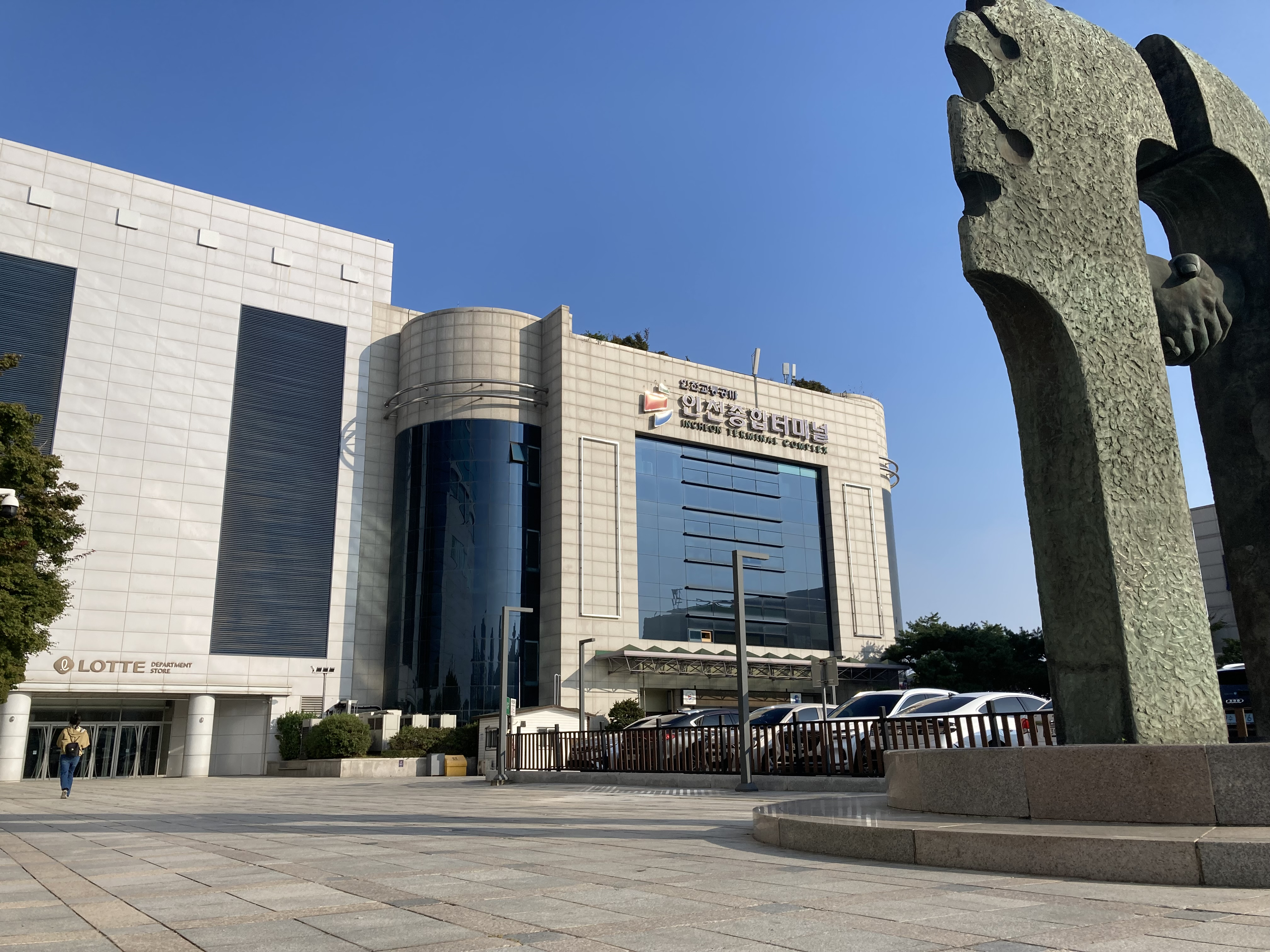
Incheon Bus Terminal Entrance

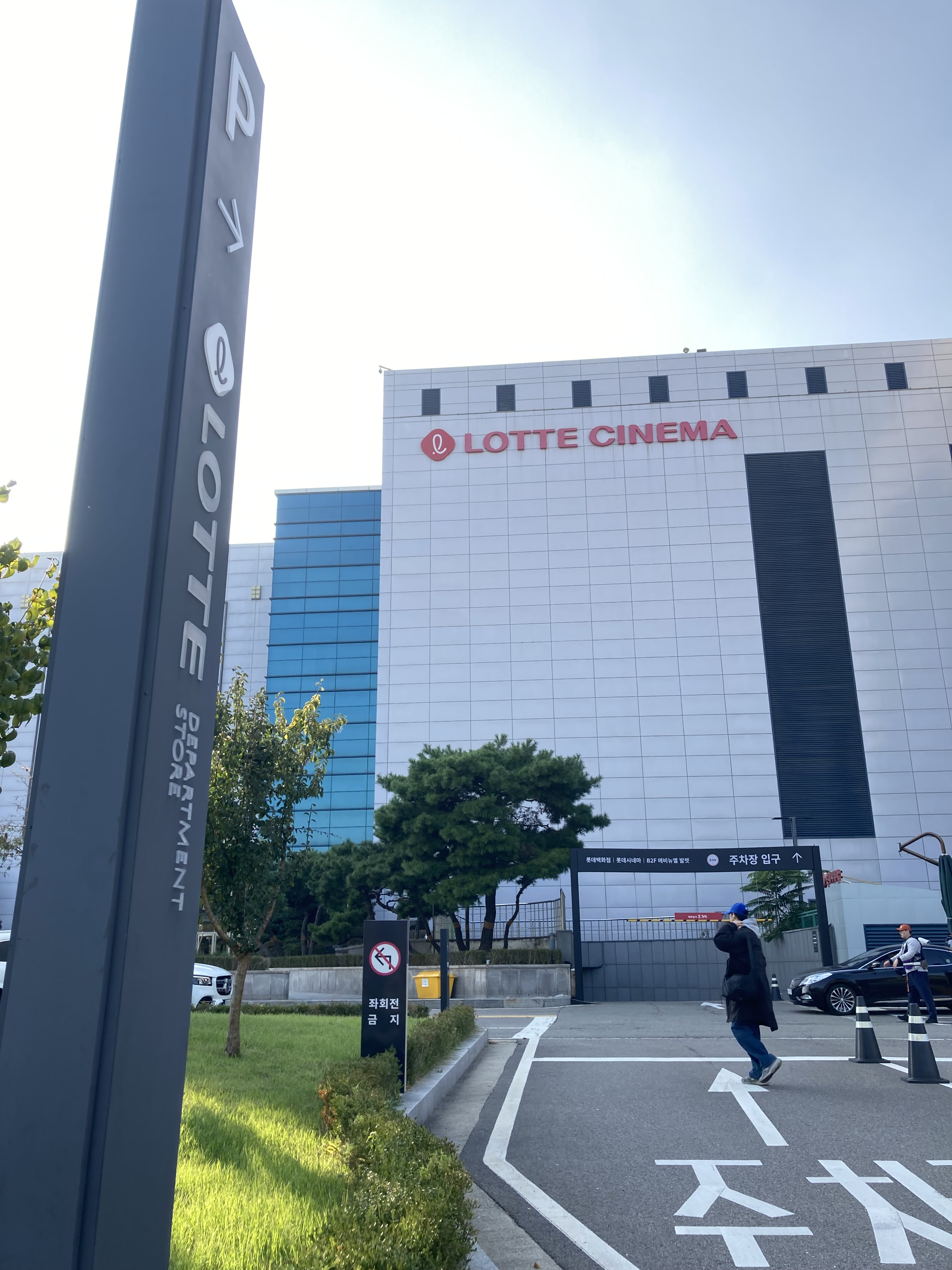
Nearby Lotte Department Parking Entrance

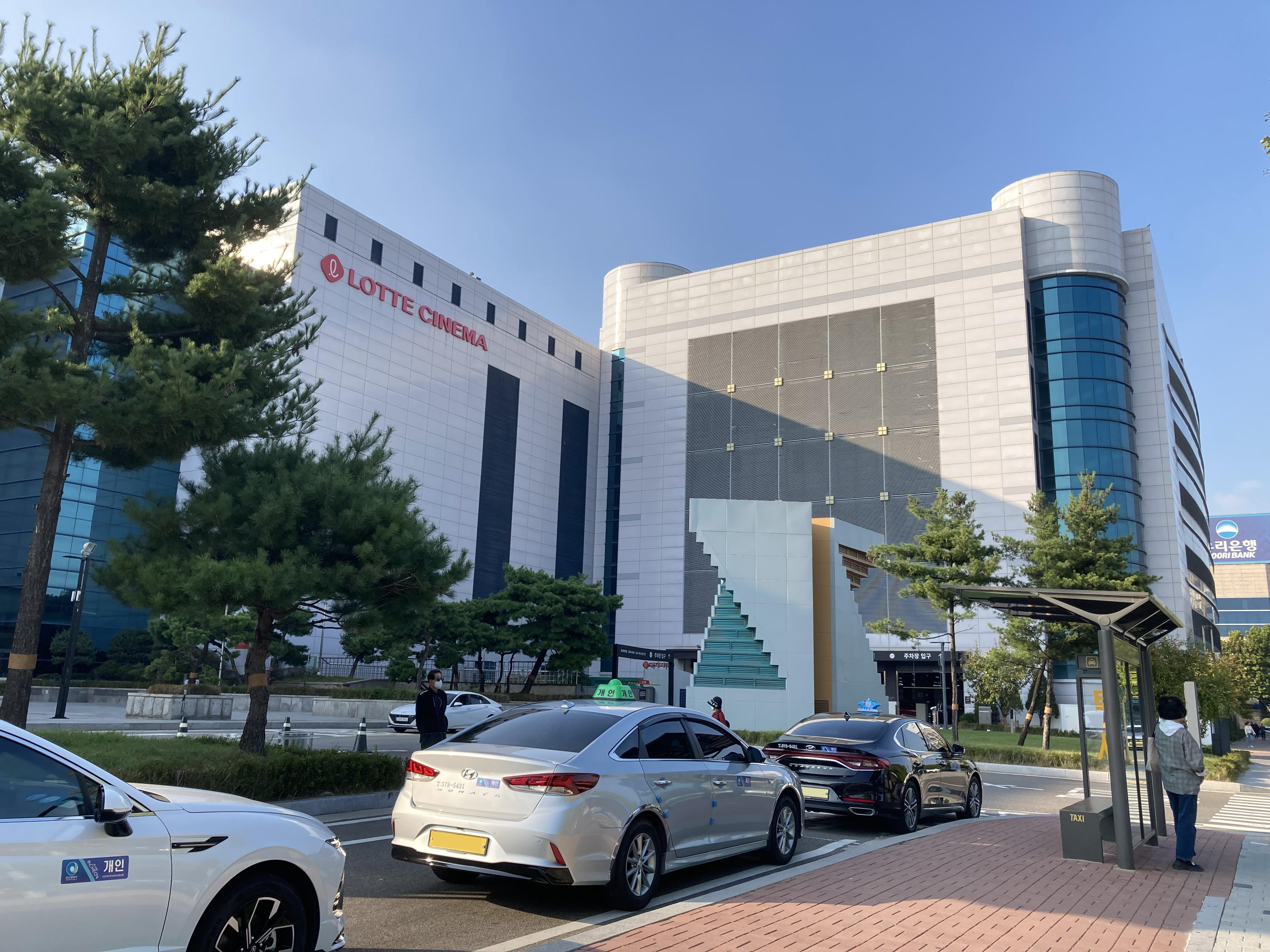
Bus Terminal Front Tax Platform

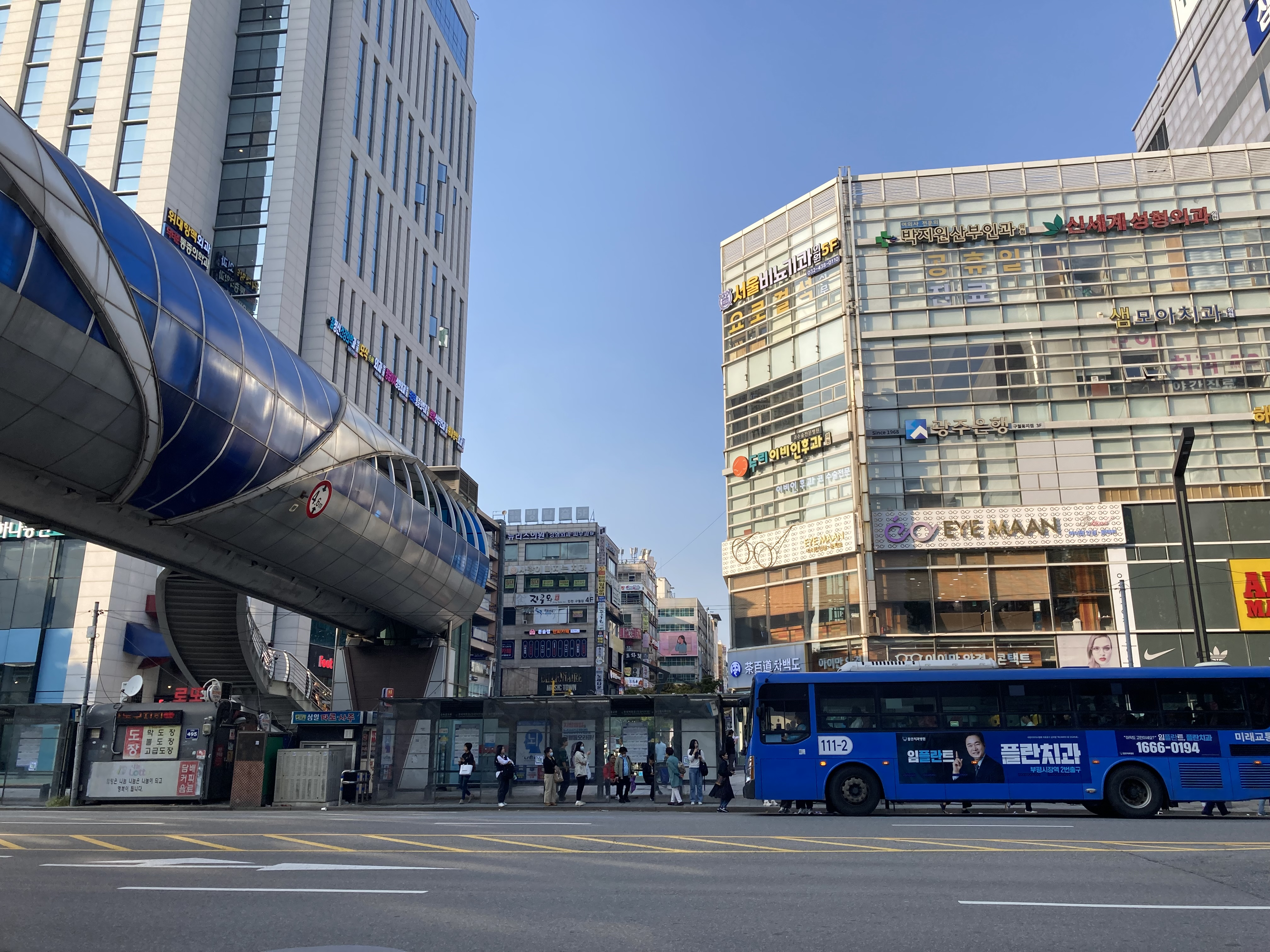
Incheon Bus Terminal Bridge

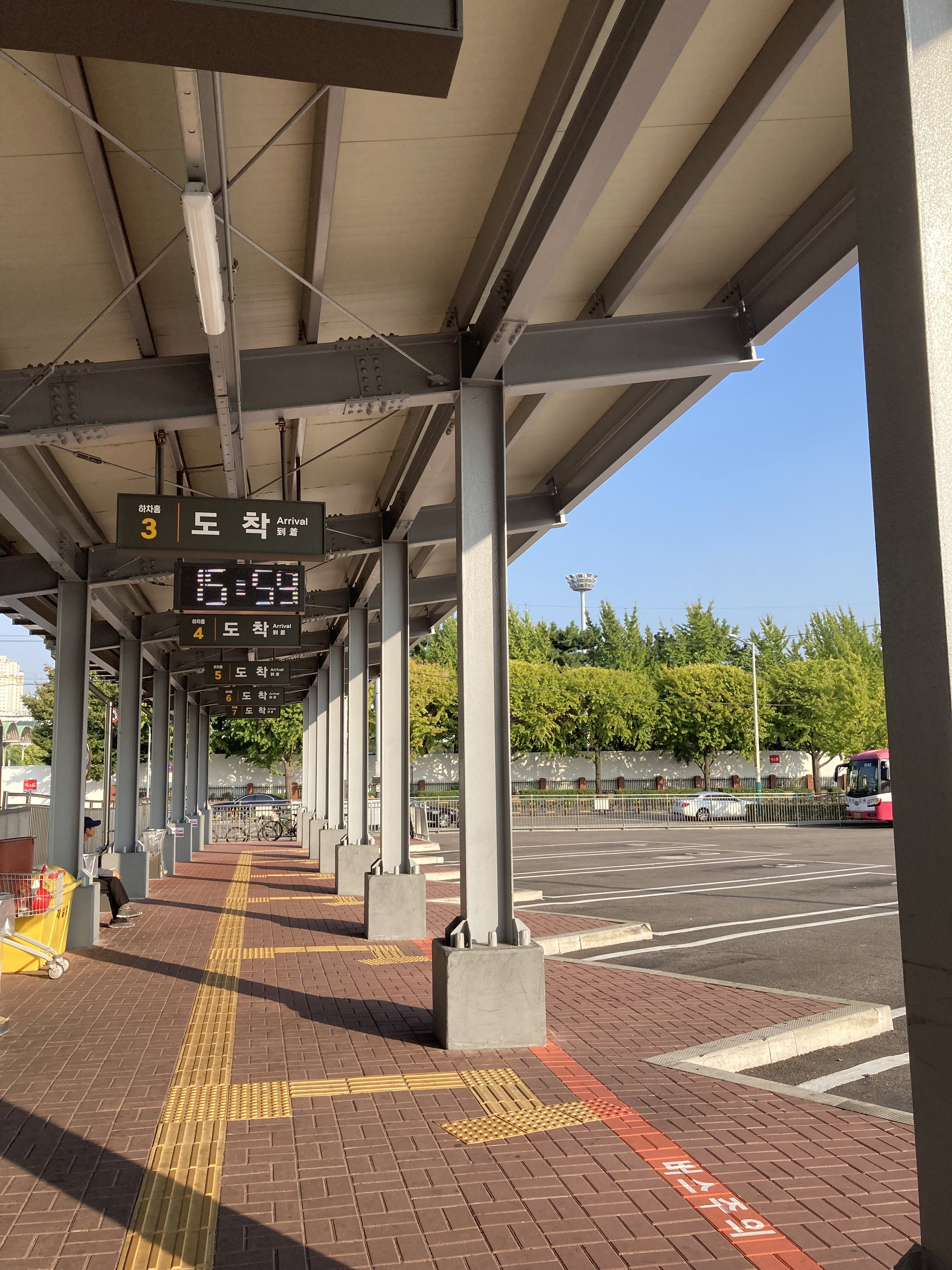
Arrival Platform

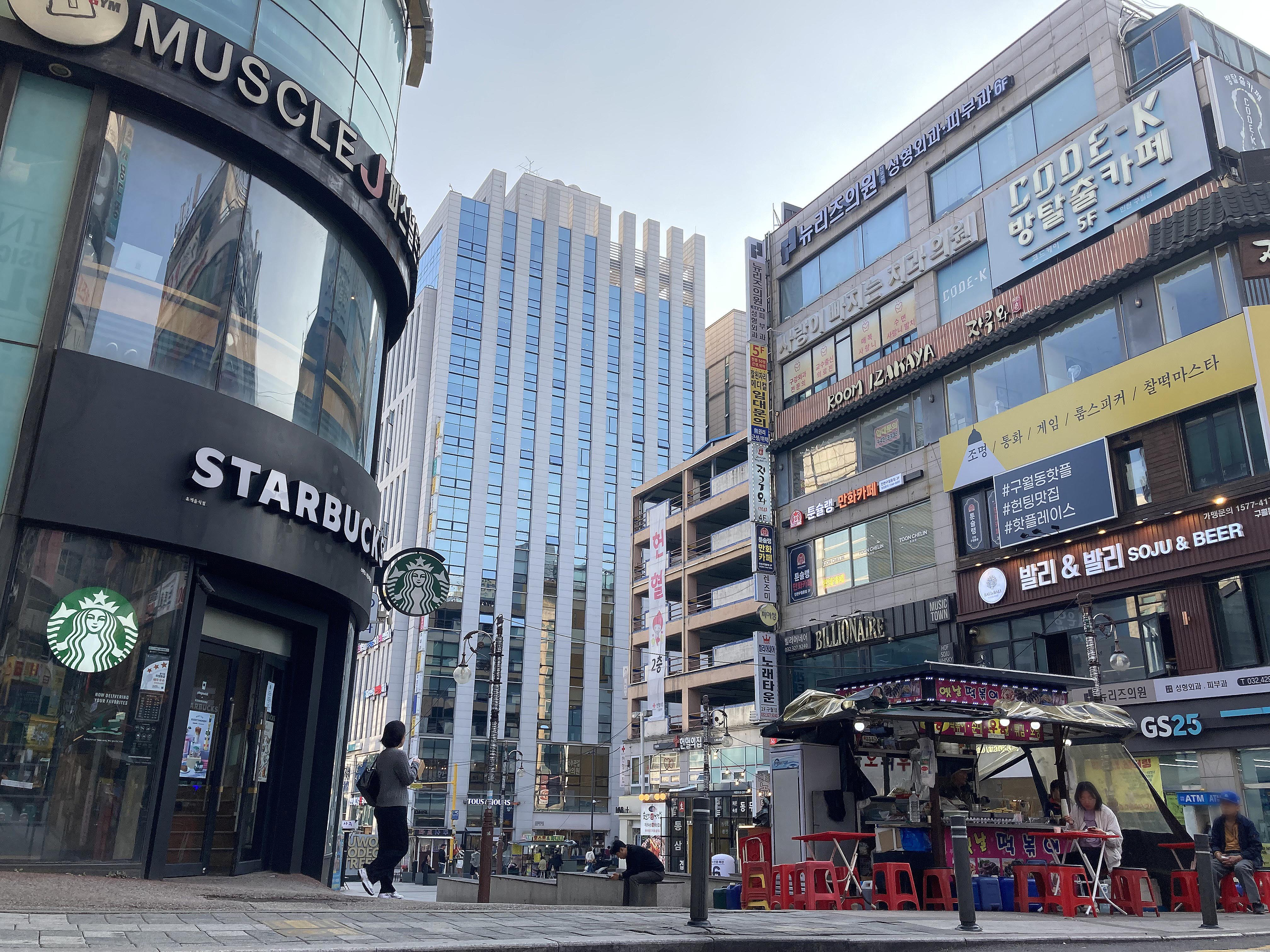
Nearby Starbucks in Guwol-dong Rodeo Street

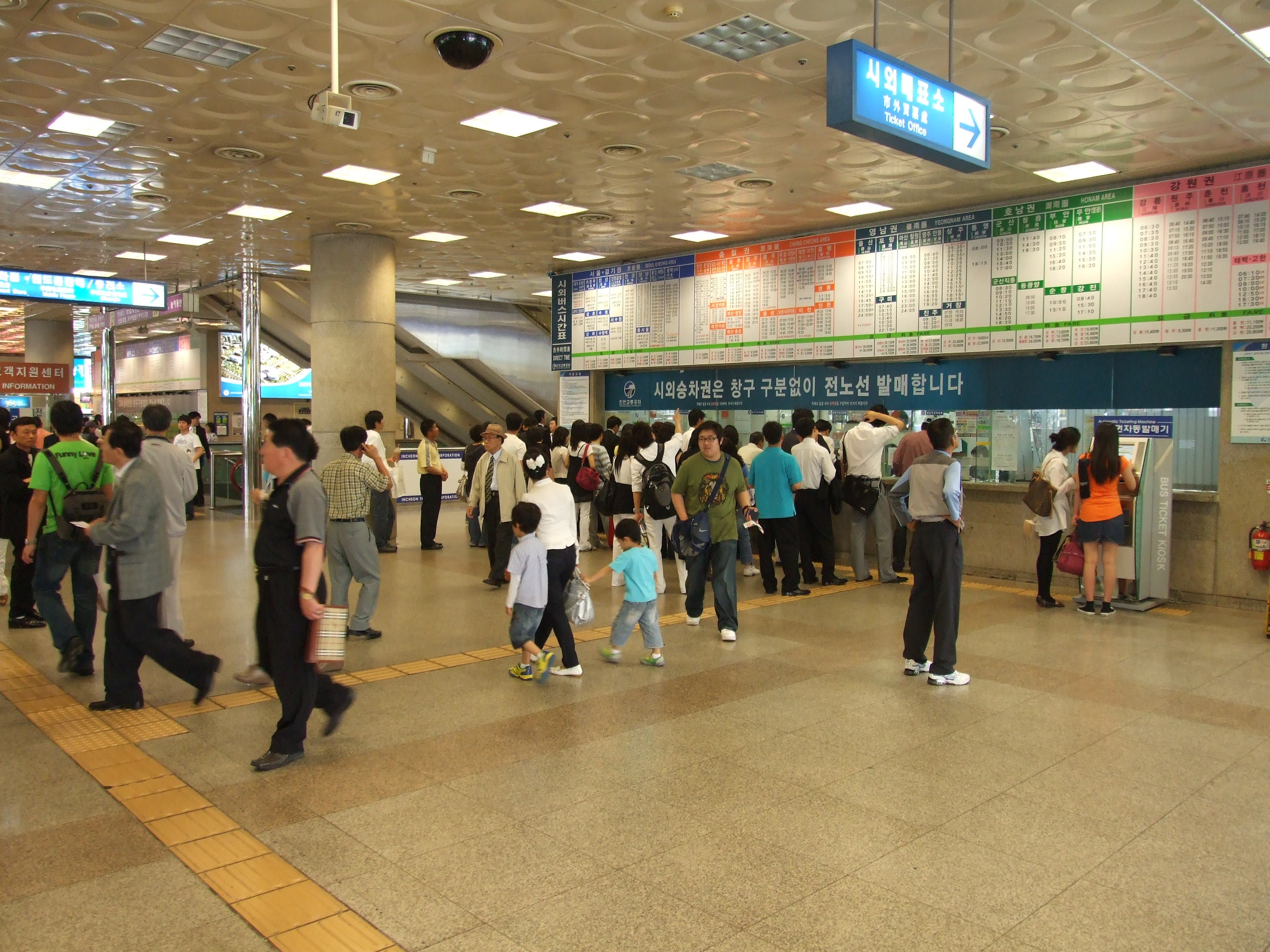
Bus Terminal Waiting Room & Ticket Office

== History ==
Originally, Incheon's bus terminal was operated with separate terminals for each operator around Dongincheon Station, but on September 25, 1975, a bus terminal with 5,000 pyeong of land and 1,200 pyeong of basement was opened in the area of 614 Yonghyeon-dong, Nam-gu, near the terminus of Gyeongin Expressway. A five-story terminal above ground was completed. At that time, Kum-A Industries built it at a cost of approximately 600 million won at the time. Afterwards, due to problems with narrow facilities and aging buildings due to expansion of development in the Incheon area, it was moved to its current location upon the opening of the Shinsegae Department Store Incheon branch on November 6, 1998. The site of the old terminal located in Yonghyeon-dong was transformed into Yonghyeon-dong Daewoo Apartments and redeveloped in 2001.

In May 2009, Incheon Transportation Corporation relocated the terminal to Unyeon-dong, Namdong-gu, Incheon Metropolitan City due to overcapacity of the current bus terminal located in Gwangyo-dong, and established a plan to redevelop the current location using private capital, but this was virtually canceled. Instead of planning to redevelop the existing site after relocating the terminal, Incheon Transportation Corporation sold the terminal to Lotte Group in September 2012 to solve financial difficulties. As a result, Shinsegae Department Store Incheon Branch closed on December 28, 2018, and was renamed Lotte Department Store Incheon Terminal Branch from January 4, 2019. During the change process, the existing Lotte Department Store Incheon branch located in Guwol-dong, opposite, was sold and changed to Elios Department Store.
