= G-Tower (Incheon) =

Skyscraper in Incheon, South Korea

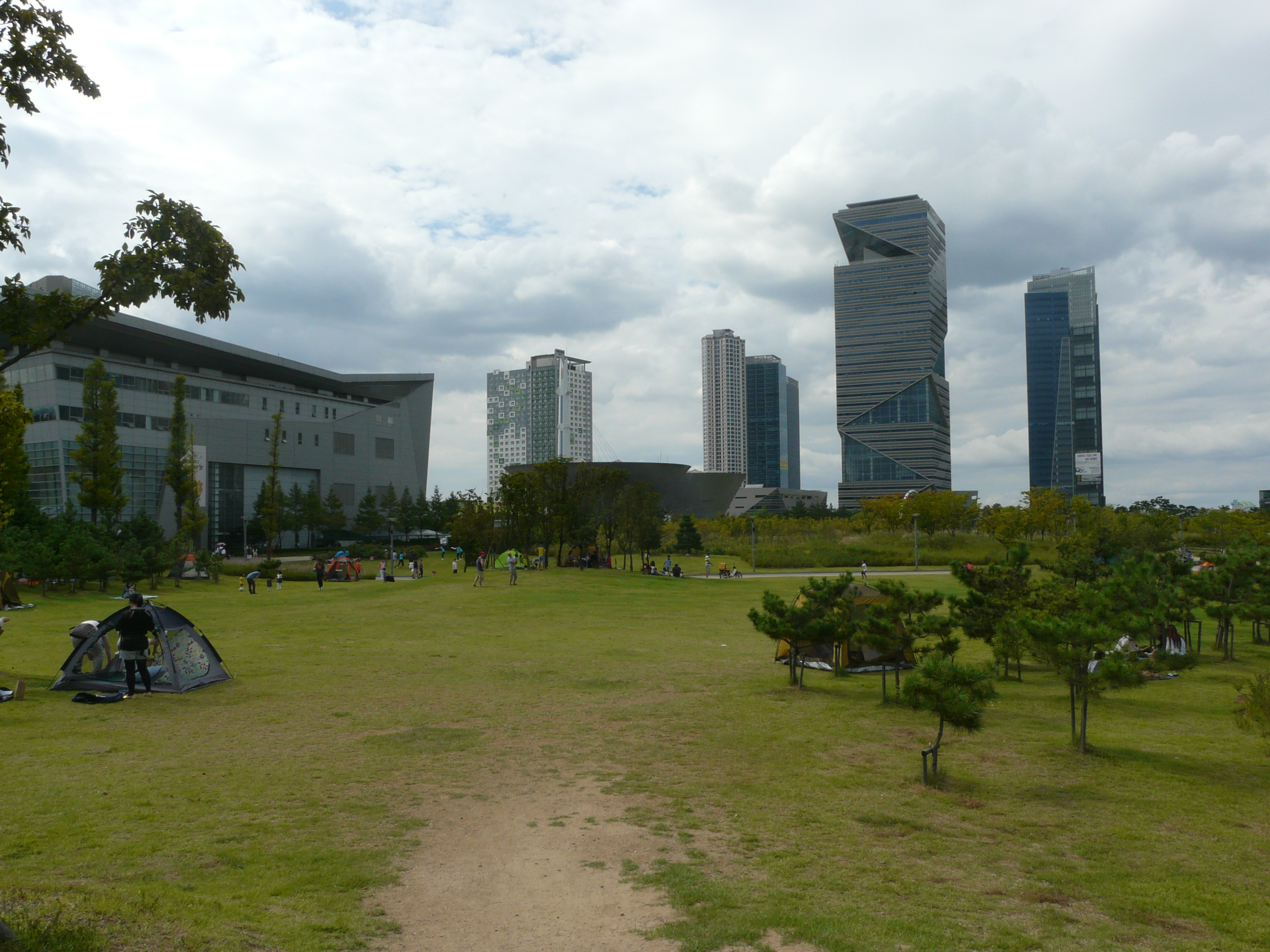
- Interactive map of the G-Tower area

General information
- Status: Complete
- Location: Incheon, South Korea
- Coordinates: 37°23′46.87″N 126°38′03.16″E
- Construction started: 2010
- Estimated completion: 2013

Height
- Height: 150 m (490 ft)

Technical details
- Floor count: 33

G-Tower (Korean: G타워) is a 33-floor, 150-metre (490 ft) skyscraper currently completed. It houses international organizations, restaurants, banks, and a post office. The city can be viewed from the 33rd floor, which is accessible to the public. The tower is popular among foreigners, as many international organizations, including United Nations offices, are based in the building.
