= Yeonsu District =

District of Incheon, South Korea

Yeonsu
- Autonomous District
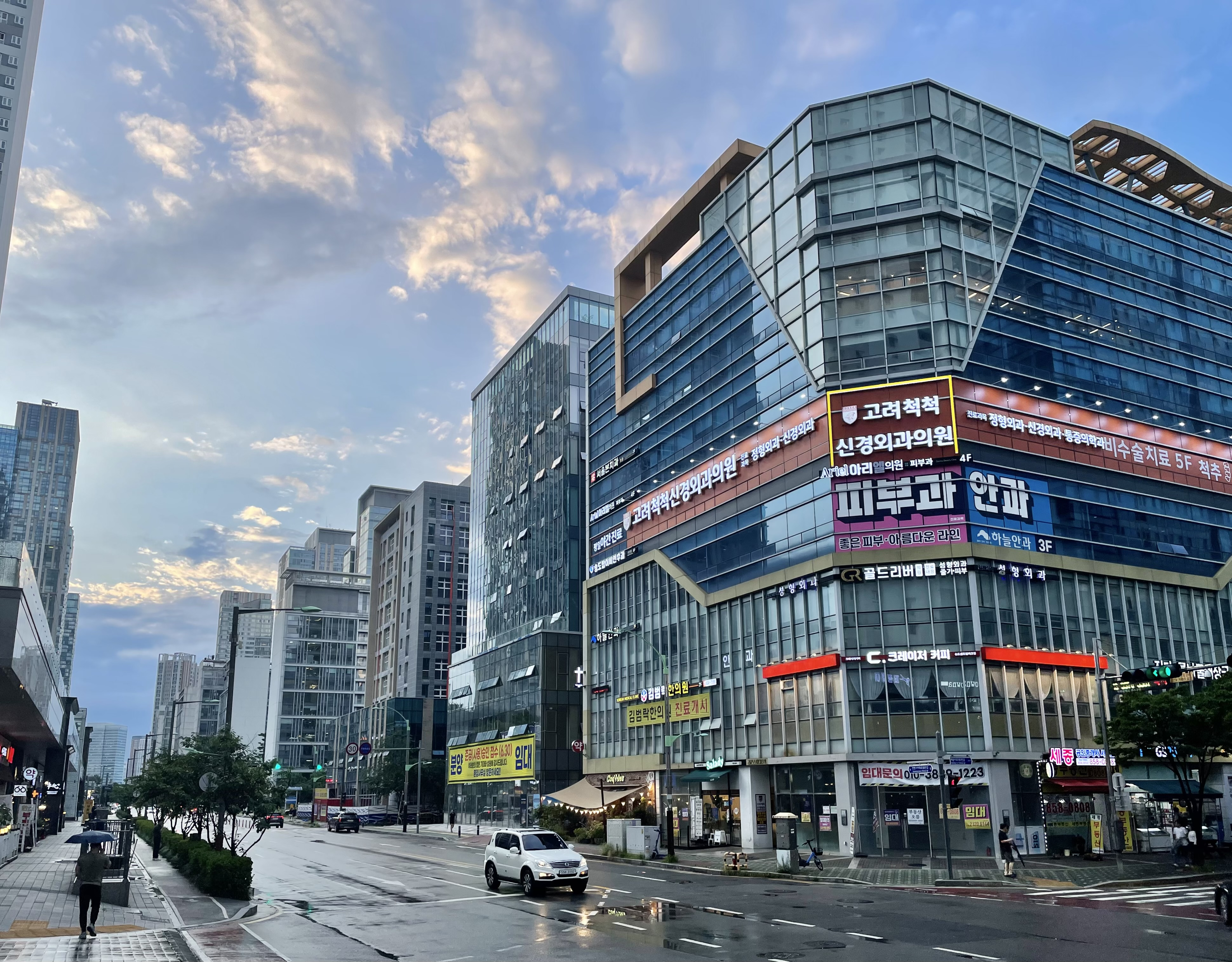
- Convensia-daero

- Flag

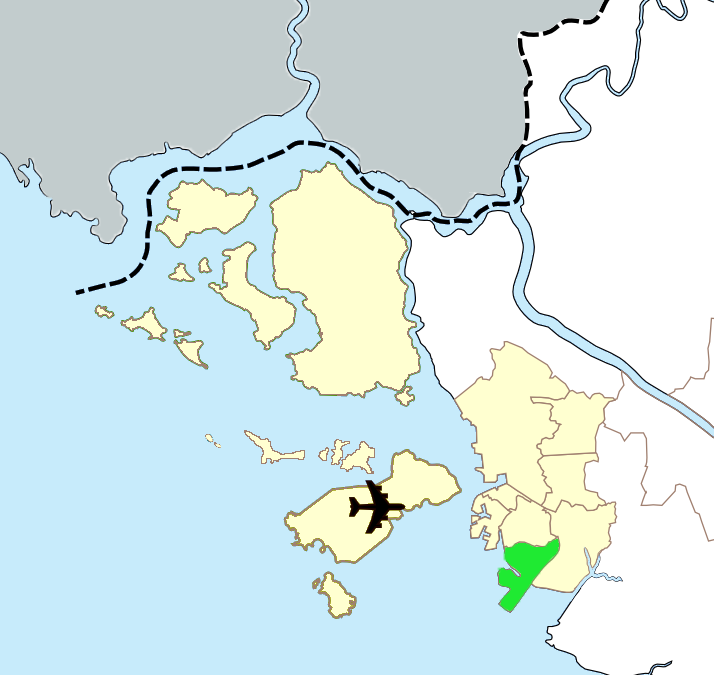
- Coordinates: 37°24′34″N 126°40′42″E
- Country: South Korea
- Region: Sudogwon
- Provincial level: Incheon
- Administrative divisions: 12 administrative dong

Area
  - Total: 50.8 km^{2} (19.6 sq mi)

Population (September 2024)
  - Total: 398,972
  - Density: 7,850/km^{2} (20,300/sq mi)
  - Dialect: Seoul
- Website: Yeonsu District Office

Korean name
- Hangul: 연수구
- Hanja: 延壽區
- RR: Yeonsu-gu
- MR: Yŏnsu-gu

Yeonsu District (Korean: 연수구) is a district in southern Incheon, South Korea. To the east is Namdong District (Namdong District), on its north border is Nam District (Nam District), and the Yellow Sea is on the west and south sides. Munhak Mountain (Munhaksan) rises in the north, and Seunggi Stream (Seunggicheon) flows south to the Yellow Sea.

== History ==
On March 1, 1995, Yeonsu District annexed part of Nam District. In addition, Yeonsu-1-dong was subdivided into Yeonsu-1-dong and Yeonsu-3-dong, and Dongchun-dong into Dongchun-1-dong and Dongchun-2-dong. On January 1, 1996, Dongchun-2-dong was divided into Dongchun-2-dong and Cheonyang-dong. In 2003, Okyeon-dong was divided into Okyeon-1-dong and Okyeon-2-dong. Cheongnyang-dong was absorbed into Donchun-3-dong. In 2006, Songdo-dong was established and placed under the jurisdiction of Dongchun-2-dong. In 2007, Donchun-2-dong was split into Dongchun-2-dong and Songdo-dong. In 2012, Songdo-dong was split into Songdo-1-dong and Songdo-2-dong.

Yeonsu District signed an agreement with Greenville, North Carolina in the United States to become sister cities in 2017.

== Description ==
Administrative divisions

The Yeonsu District of Incheon is made up of 6 legal divisions and 12 administrative divisions. The area of Yeonsu District is 42.74 km^{2}.

Administrative Division	Chinese characters	Area (km^{2})	Households	Population
Ongnyeon-1(il)-dong	玉蓮1洞	2.15	8,193	23,689
Ongnyeon-2-(i)-dong	玉蓮2洞	1.93	8,436	25,204
Seonhak-dong	仙鶴洞	2.41	8,492	22,103
Yeonsu-1(il)-dong	延壽1洞	1.52	11,681	28,090
Yeonsu-2(i)-dong	延壽2洞	1.00	9,813	25,499
Yeonsu-3(sam)-dong	延壽3洞	1.00	7,793	21,599
Cheonghak-dong	靑鶴洞	2.39	12,651	31,921
Dongchun-1(il)-dong	東春1洞	3.40	6,091	18,893
Dongchun-2(i)-dong	東春2洞	4.55	7,189	22,769
Dongchun-3(sam)-dong	東春3洞	0.70	6,044	20,869
Songdo-1(il)-dong	松島1洞	15.13	10,704	35,026
Songdo-2(i)-dong	松島2洞	12.22	6,432	21,457
Yeonsu District	延壽區	42.74	104,748	292,589

The area is also host to Hambak Village, a community of majority foreigners from Central Asia.

=== Population ===
As of 2010, the population of the 0-14 age group was 25%; of those 65 and over, 6.7%. The working class population of the 15-64 age group was 68.21%, less than the national average of 72.8%. There were somewhat more males with 100.6 males to 100 females.

=== Politics ===
Yeonsu District has one election district. As the population grew, it was suggested that another district be created for the 2016 general election.

== Attractions ==
The district contains the National Museum of World Writing Systems, which opened in 2023.

== Education ==
- Chadwick International School Songdo
- Incheon Catholic University
- Yeonsu Girls' High School
- Incheon National University

== See also ==
- Songdo
