= Weidong Ferry =

Shipping company connecting South Korea and China

Weihai Weidong Ferry Co Ltd is a joint Chinese-South Korean company that operates international ferries between the Chinese province of Shandong and the South Korean port city of Incheon.

== Operations ==
Weidong operate 4 vessels:

- New Golden Bridge VII (passenger & cargo)
- New Golden Bridge V (passenger & cargo)
- Sinokor Pyongtaek (container)
- MV Kalimanis (container)

== Passenger Operations ==
=== New Golden Bridge VII ===
The New Golden Bridge VII operates three weekly services between Weihai and Incheon, departing Weihai at 19:00 on Sunday, Tuesday & Thursday, arriving into Incheon at 9:30 the next day. The return service departs Incheon at 18:30 on Monday, Wednesday and Saturday, arriving into Weihai at 09:00 the next day.

The New Golden Bridge VII has a gross weight of 27,000 MT. It has accommodation for 796(Maximum including crew) passengers over five classes and a Ro-Ro cargo capacity of 7,200Ton TEU.

=== New Golden Bridge V ===
The New Golden Bridge V operates three weekly services between Qingdao and Incheon, departing Qingdao at 17:00 on Monday, Wednesday & Friday, arriving into Incheon at 11:00 the next day. The return service departs Incheon at 17:00 on Tuesday, Thursday and Saturday, arriving into Qingdao at 09:00 the next day.

The New Golden Bridge V has a gross weight of 30,000 MT. It has accommodation for 660 passengers over four classes and a Ro-Ro cargo capacity of 325 TEU.

== Cargo Operations ==
Weidong operate 2 cargo only ships that do not routinely carry fare paying passengers

=== Sinokor Pyongtaek ===
Sinokor Pyongtaek operates twice weekly between Weihai and Incheon, departing Weihai at 18:00 on Sunday and Wednesday, arriving into Incheon at 11:00 the next day. The return service departs Incheon at 19:00 on Tuesday and 21:00 on Thursday, arriving into Weihai at 08:00 on Wednesday and 10:00 on Friday.

=== MV Kalimanis ===
MV Kalimanis operates twice weekly between Qingdao and Incheon, departing Qingdao at 18:00 on Wednesday & Saturday, arriving into Incheon at 19:00 the next day. The return service departs Incheon at 08:00 on Tuesday and Friday, arriving into Qingdao at 07:00 the next day.
