= Cheongna International City station =

Metro station in Incheon, South Korea

청라국제도시 (하나금융타운); Cheongna Int'l City (Hana Financial Town)
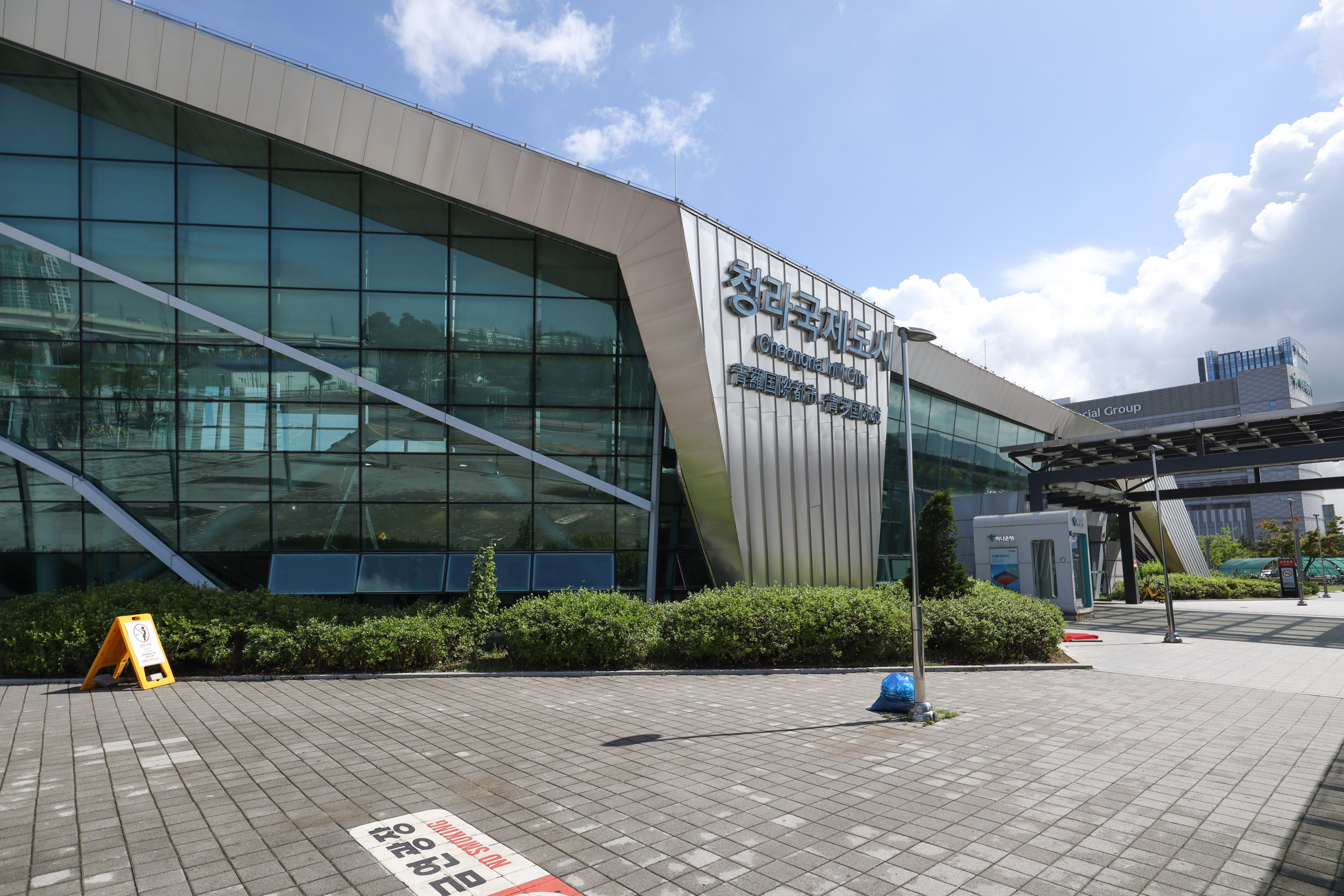
- Cheongna International City station building

Korean name
- Hangul: 청라국제도시역
- Hanja: 靑羅國際都市驛
- Revised Romanization: Cheongna gukje dosi-yeok
- McCune–Reischauer: Ch'ŏngna gukche tosi-yŏk

General information
- Location: Gyeongseo-dong, Seohae District, Incheon
- Coordinates: 37.5552°N 126.6252°E
- Operator: Airport Railroad Co., Ltd.
- Line: AREX
- Platforms: 1
- Tracks: 2

Construction
- Structure type: Aboveground

History
- Opened: June 21, 2014

Services
Preceding station	Seoul Metropolitan Subway	Following station
Geomam towards Seoul	AREX Local	Yeongjong towards Incheon Int'l Airport Terminal 2
Location

Cheongna International City (Korean: 청라국제도시역; Hanja: 靑羅國際都市驛) is a station on AREX in Gyeongseo-dong, Seohae District, Incheon, South Korea.

It is situated near the entrance of the Incheon International Airport Expressway. It has an unusual design: the first building is built for access to the station, and the second building, which houses the platforms, is connected to the first building with a skybridge. It was opened in 2014.

== Station layout ==
G	Street Level	Exits
L1	Concourse	Faregates, Ticketing Machines, Station Control
L2; Platforms	Eastbound	AREX Local toward Incheon International Airport Terminal 2 (Yeongjong) → AREX Express does not stop here →
L2; Platforms	Island platform, doors will open on the right
L2; Platforms	Westbound	← AREX Local toward Seoul (Geomam) ← AREX Express does not stop here

== Services ==
A bimodal tram connects to the station.

== Gallery ==
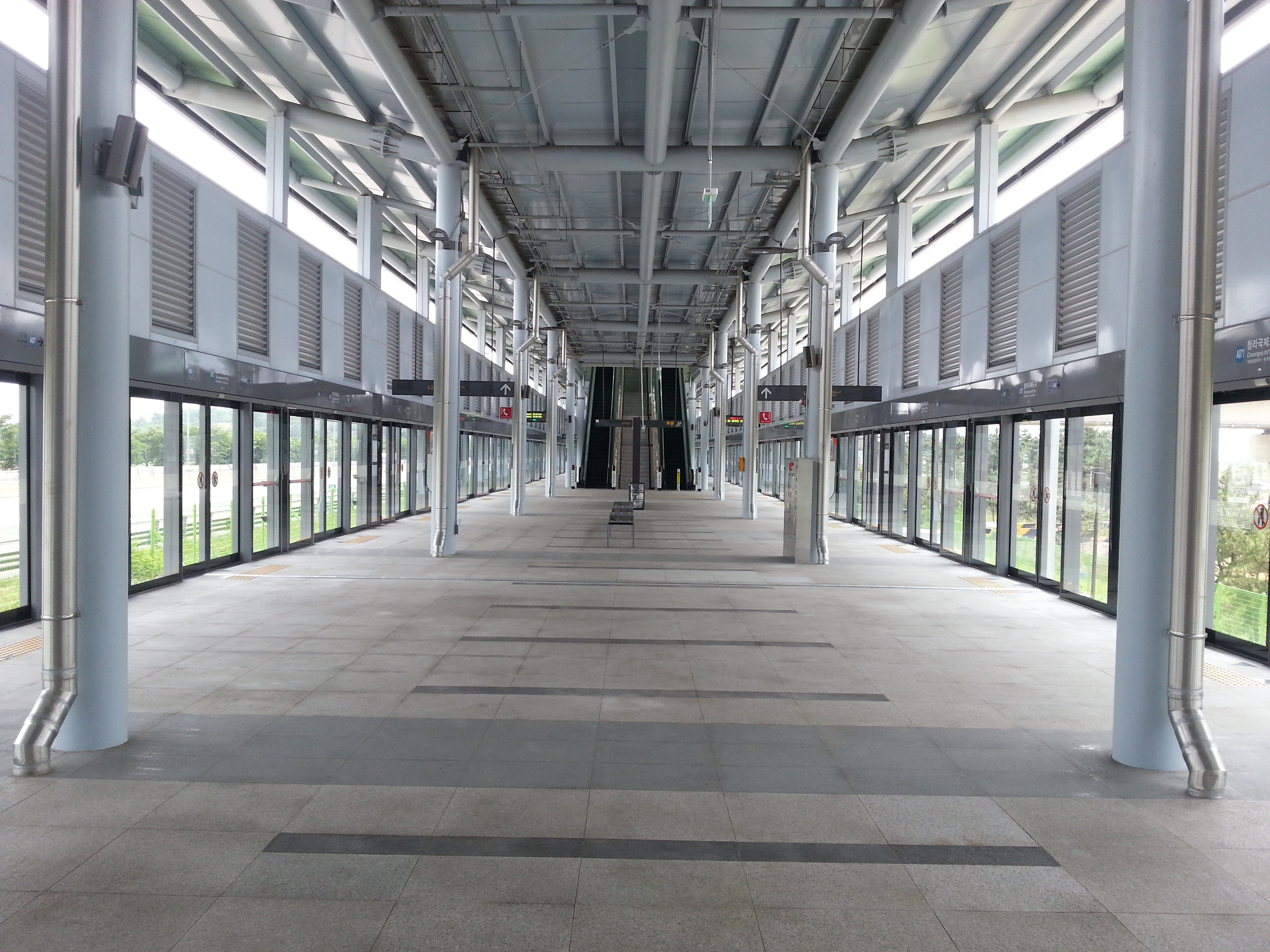
Platforms

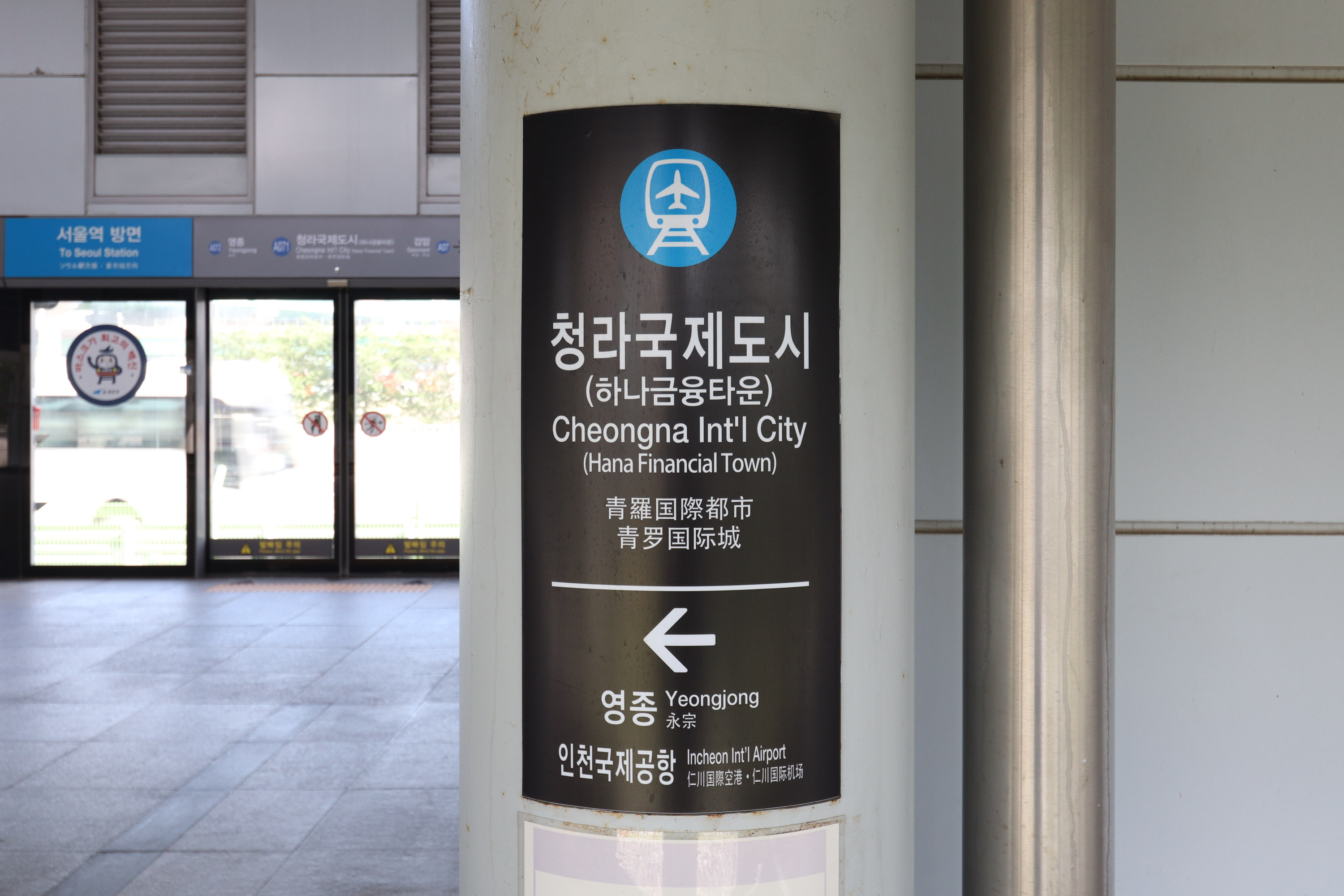
Station nameplate

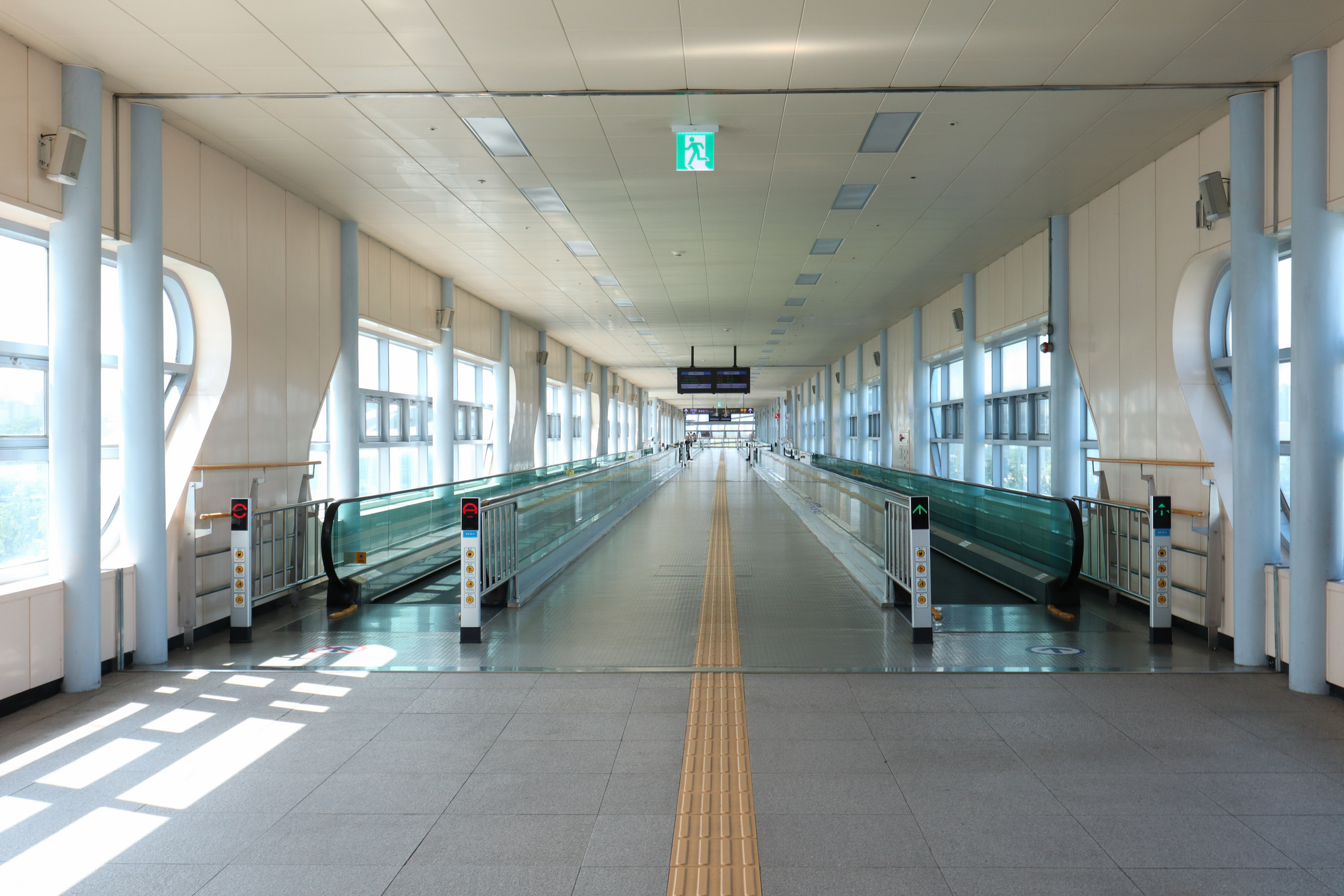
Skybridge
