= Geomam station =

Metro station in Incheon, South Korea

Coordinates: 37°34′9″N 126°40′25″E

검암 (한국환경공단); Geomam (Korea Environment Corporation)
I207
검암 (검암역 로얄파크씨티)
Geomam
(Geomam Station Royal Park City)
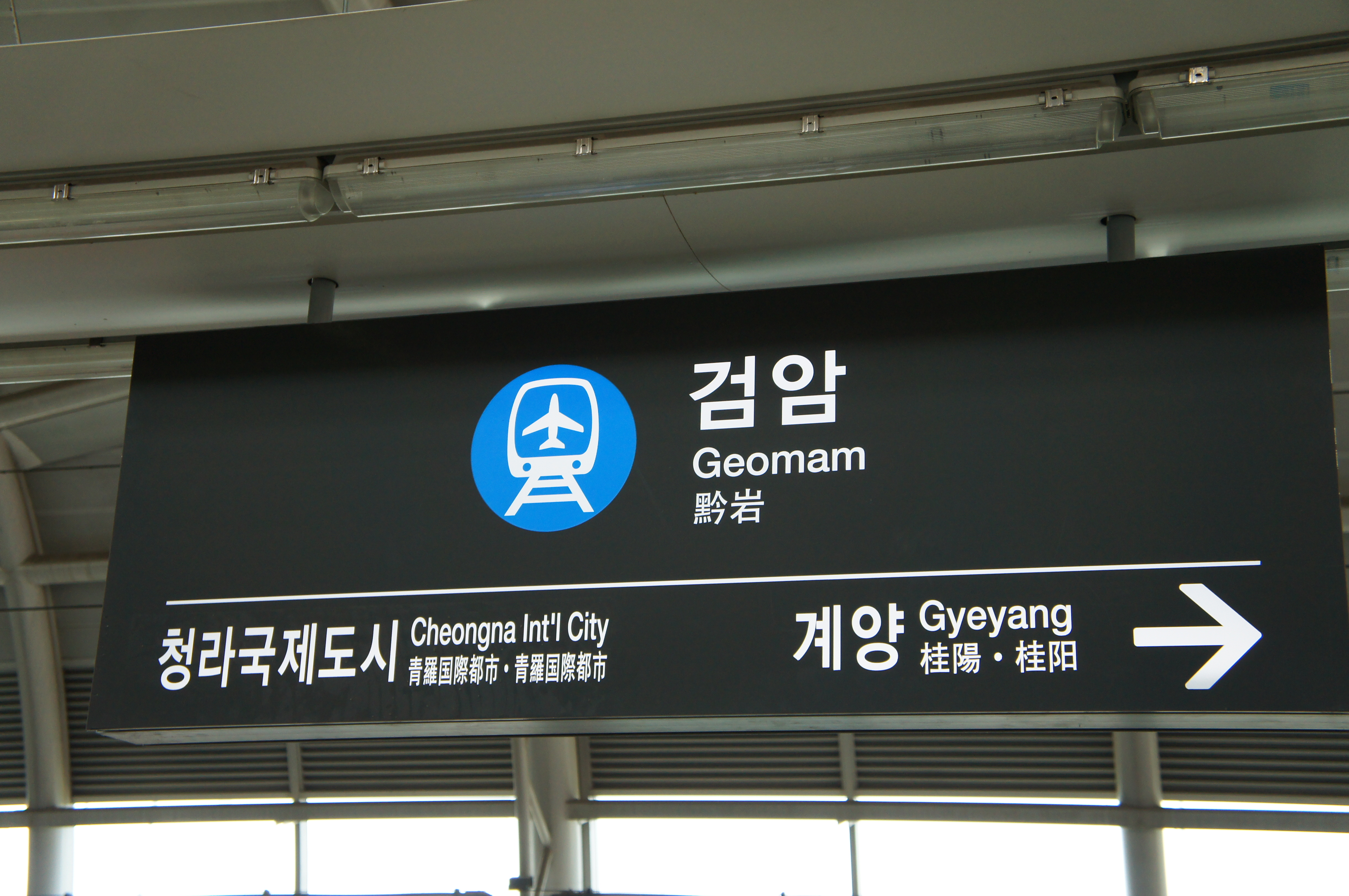
- Geomam AREX station name sign

Korean name
- Hangul: 검암역
- Hanja: 黔岩驛
- Revised Romanization: Geomam-yeok
- McCune–Reischauer: Kŏmam-yŏk

General information
- Location: 414-204 Geomam-dong, 26 Geombawiro, Seohae District, Incheon
- Operator: Airport Railroad Co., Ltd. Incheon Transit Corporation
- Lines: AREX; Incheon Line 2
- Platforms: 4
- Tracks: 6

Construction
- Structure type: Aboveground/Underground

Key dates
- March 23, 2007: AREX opened
- July 30, 2016: Incheon Line 2 opened
- March 28, 2018: KTX service suspended

Services
Preceding station	Seoul Metropolitan Subway	Following station
Gyeyang towards Seoul Station	AREX Local	Cheongna International City towards Incheon Int'l Airport Terminal 2
Preceding station	Incheon Subway	Following station
Dokjeong towards Geomdan Oryu	Incheon Line 2	Geombawi towards Unyeon
Location

Geomam station is a railway station on AREX and Incheon Subway Line 2. Since June 2014, the KTX train operates from Incheon International Airport to Busan or Mokpo. It has stopped operating KTX since March 2018. In September 2018, Korail officially announced that they would stop operating KTX to Incheon International Airport due to lack of passenger use. This was the first KTX station after Incheon Airport. Before KTX started to run on AREX, all platforms were high-leveled with screen doors. The KTX started to run, they took away the platform screen doors only at the both end of the side horizontally and turned into low-leveled platform without screen doors.

== Vicinity ==
- Korail Airport Railroad Corporation headquarters
- SeoIncheon High School
- Geomam Elementary School
- Geomam-sageori (4-way junction)

== Gallery ==
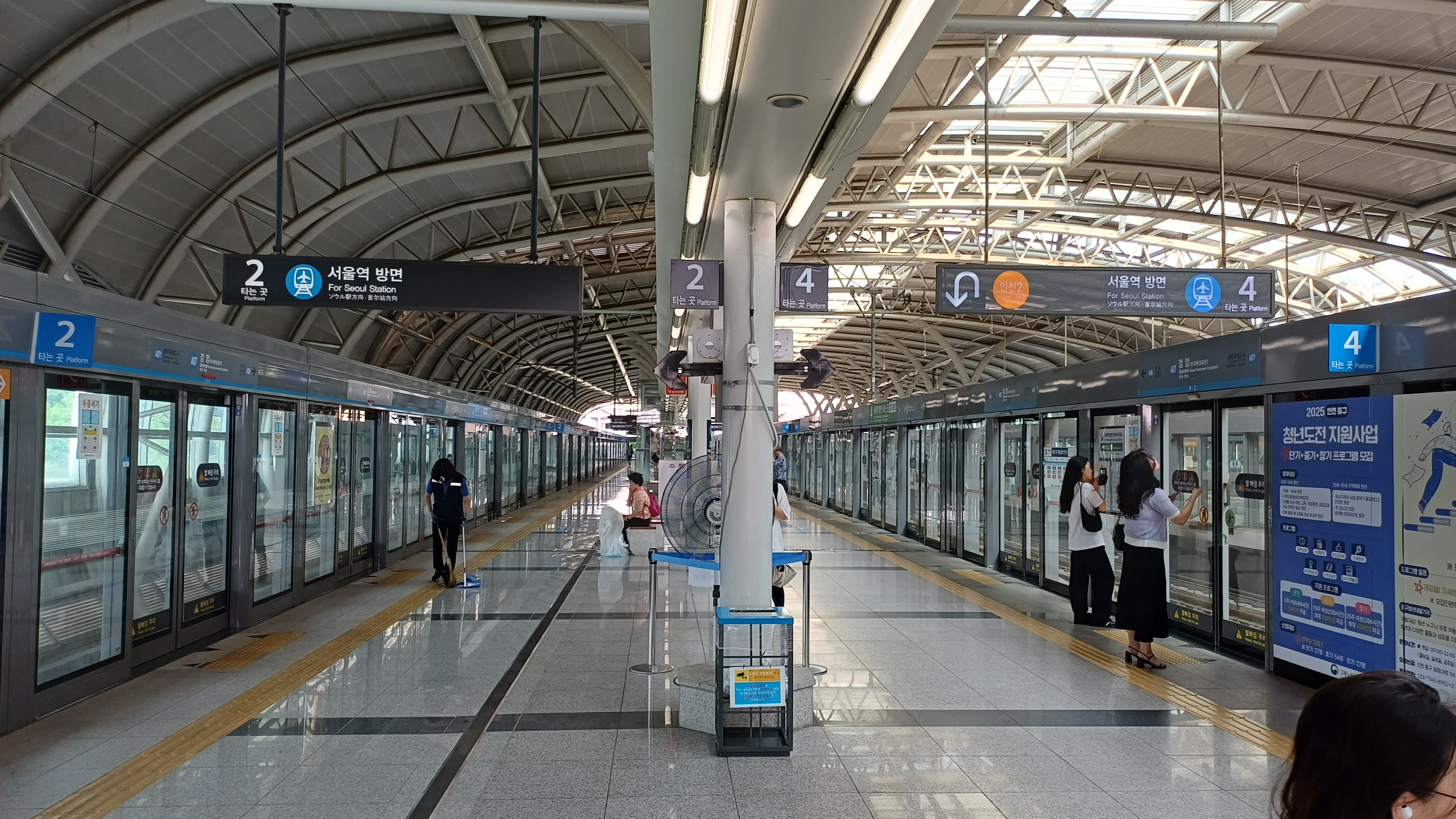
AREX Platform

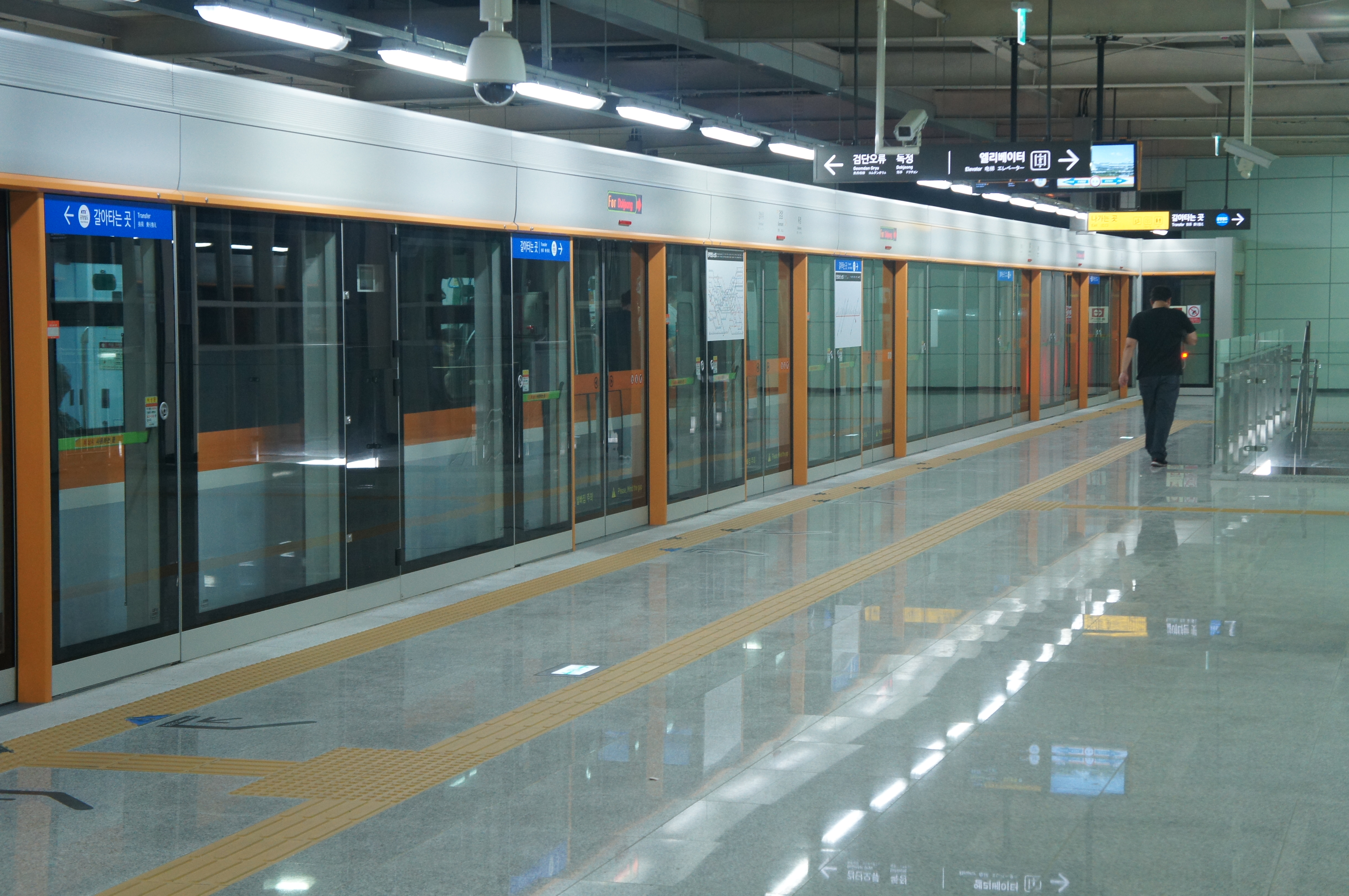
Incheon Line 2 platform

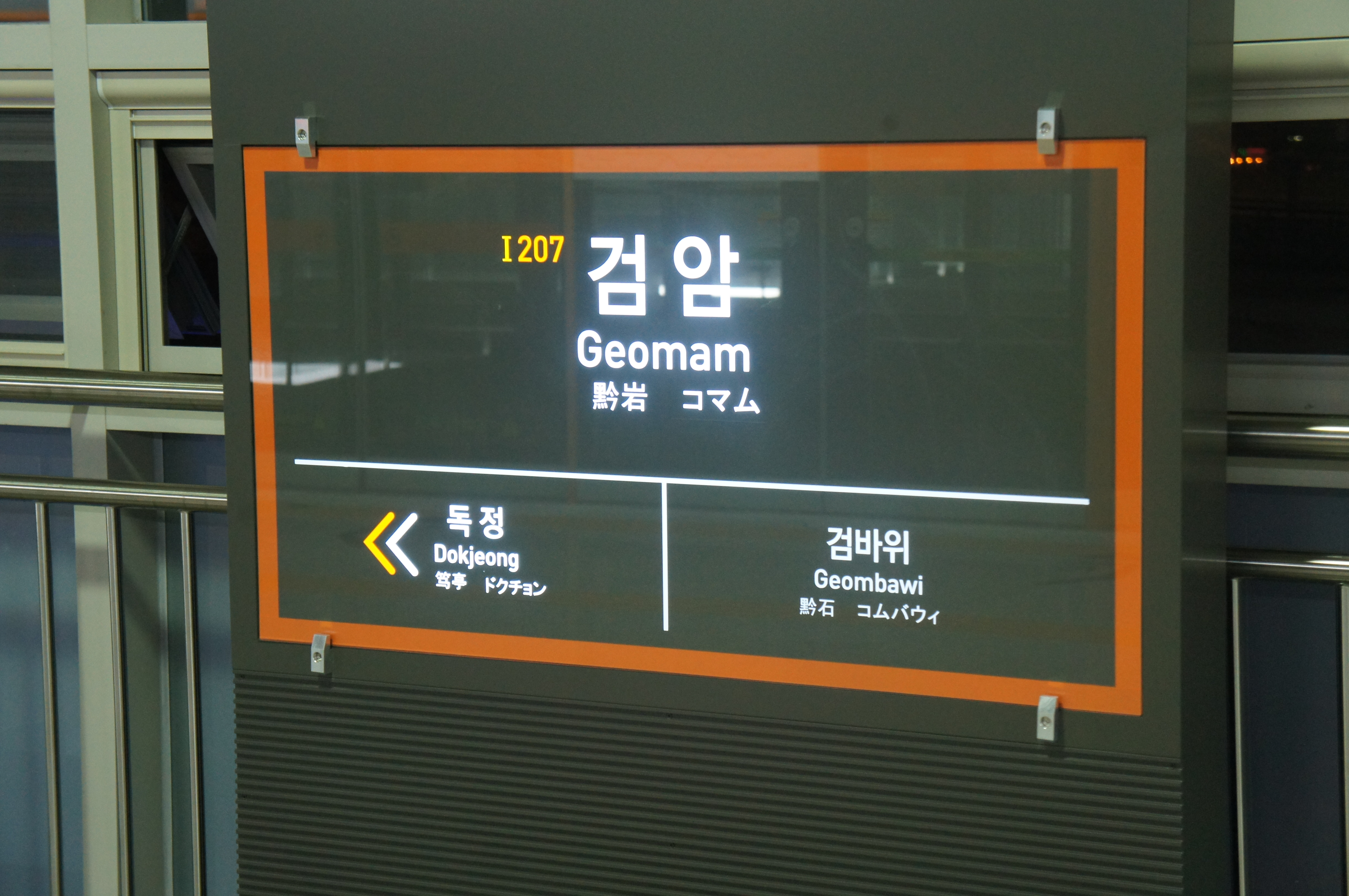
Incheon Line 2 station name sign
