= Yeongjong station =

Metro station in Incheon, South Korea

영종; Yeongjong
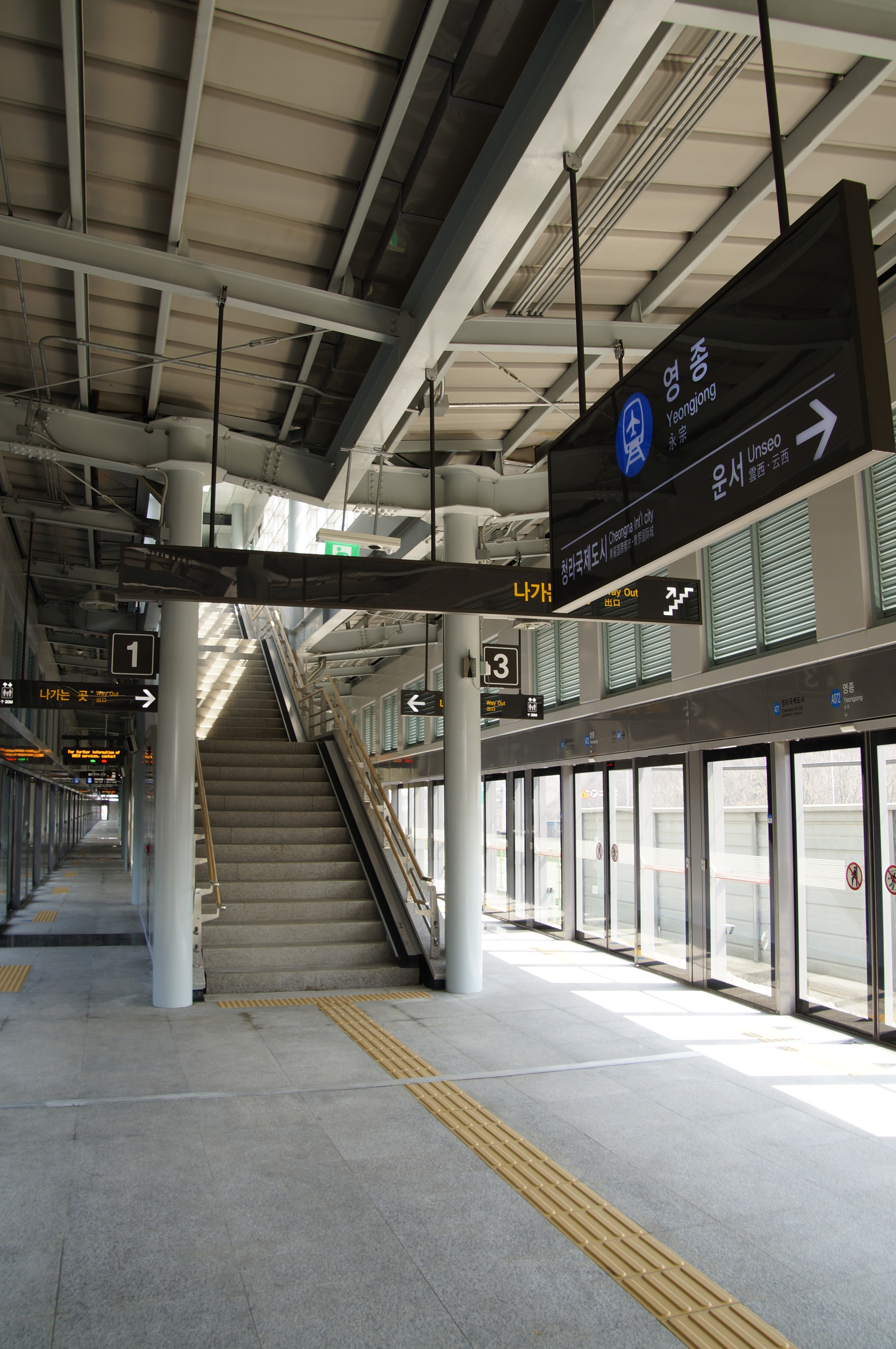
- Yeongjong station

Korean name
- Hangul: 영종역
- Hanja: 永宗驛
- Revised Romanization: Yeongjong yeok
- McCune–Reischauer: Yŏng chong yŏk

General information
- Location: Unbuk-dong, Yeongjong District, Incheon
- Operator: Airport Railroad Co., Ltd.
- Line: AREX
- Platforms: 2
- Tracks: 4

Construction
- Structure type: Underground

History
- Opened: March 26, 2016

Services
Preceding station	Seoul Metropolitan Subway	Following station
Cheongna International City towards Seoul	AREX Local	Unseo towards Incheon Int'l Airport Terminal 2
Location

Yeongjong station is a railway station on AREX located in Unbuk-dong, Yeongjong District, Incheon, South Korea. Although it was present as a station shell when the first phase of the line opened (as a 2-track, 2-platform station), it was opened almost a decade later on March 26, 2016.

== Structure ==
The form of the platform is a two-sided four-line double-sum platform. If the 2nd or 3rd station inside is mainline, the 1st and 4th station outside is mainline, and if the direct train is overtaking, the general train is evacuated by handling passengers on the mainline.

From the time of its opening, a two-sided, two- way counter platform structure was constructed in advance to prepare for the new station. However, as the plan was changed so that the sub-main line, which was originally planned to be installed at Cheongna International City station, was built at this station, the new station was constructed and used at a location slightly shifted toward Cheongna International City station.
