= AREX Class 2000 =

Airport commuter train

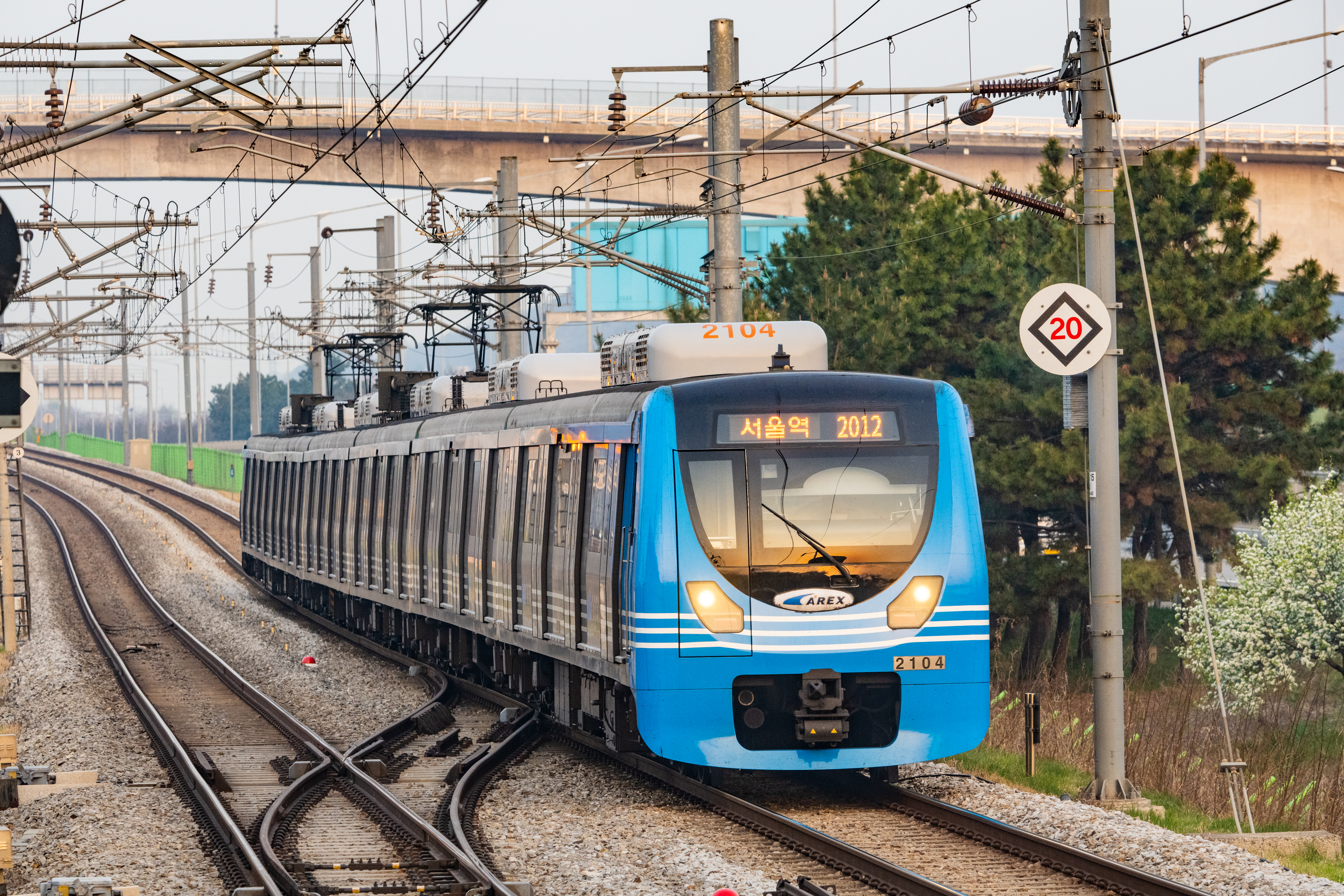
- AREX Class 2000 (1st generation)
- Stock type: Electric multiple unit
- Manufacturer: Hyundai Rotem
- Constructed: 2005–2006 (1st generation, 1st batch); 2009–2010 (1st generation, 2nd batch); 2017 (1st generation, 3rd batch); 2025 (2nd generation)
- Number in service: 9 (1st generation, 1st batch); 11 (1st generation, 2nd batch); 2 (1st generation, 3rd batch); 9 (2nd generation)
- Formation: 6 cars per train TC-M'-M'-M'-M'-TC
- Fleet numbers: 2-01–2-09 (1st generation, 1st batch); 2-10–2-20 (1st generation, 2nd batch); 2-21–2-22 (1st generation, 3rd batch); 2-23–2-31 (2nd generation)
- Line served: AREX (all-stop services only)

Specifications
- Maximum speed: 110 km/h (68 mph) (service); 1st generation: 120 km/h (75 mph) (design); 2nd generation: 150 km/h (93 mph) (design)
- Traction system: Hyundai Rotem IGBT-VVVF (1st generation); Toshiba SiC-VVVF (2nd generation)
- Power output: 4200 kW
- Deceleration: 3.5km/h/s (service), 4.5km/h/s (emergency)
- Electric system: 25 kV AC 60 Hz
- Headlight type: Light-emitting diode

The AREX Class 2000 is an electric multiple unit of the Airport Railroad operated by the Incheon International Airport Railroad on the AREX service. It is used on the all-stop AREX services and hence has a more metro like layout with 4 pairs of doors per side and longitudinal seating, in contrast to the express layout the Class 1000 has.

It is equipped with CCTV monitors and ATP speedometers from Alstom to support driver-only operation, and like commuter trains on other lines or urban railway vehicles, it lacks restrooms. Currently a total of 31 trainsets of 6 cars each (186 cars) are in operation.

== History ==
The first 9 sets, numbered 2-01 to 2-09, were manufactured between September 2005 and February 2006 and were delivered between December 2005 and July 2006. They were delivered by rail towards Incheon station, where they were transferred to Incheon Port, sent to Yeongjongdo, and transported to Yongyu Depot.

The second batch of trains, numbered 2-10 to 2-20, were manufactured between June 2009 and March 2010 and were delivered between December 2009 and June 2010. They were delivered by rail towards Susaek station and transported to Yongyu Depot.

The third batch of trains, numbered 2-21 and 2-22, were manufactured and delivered in 2Q 2017. On September 15, 2025, the first of nine second generation 2000 series trains began revenue service on the all-stop service. The trains feature a redesigned exterior and interior and a top operating speed of 150 km/h (93 mph). Two more sets are expected to enter service by October 17 with the remaining six entering service by the end of the year.

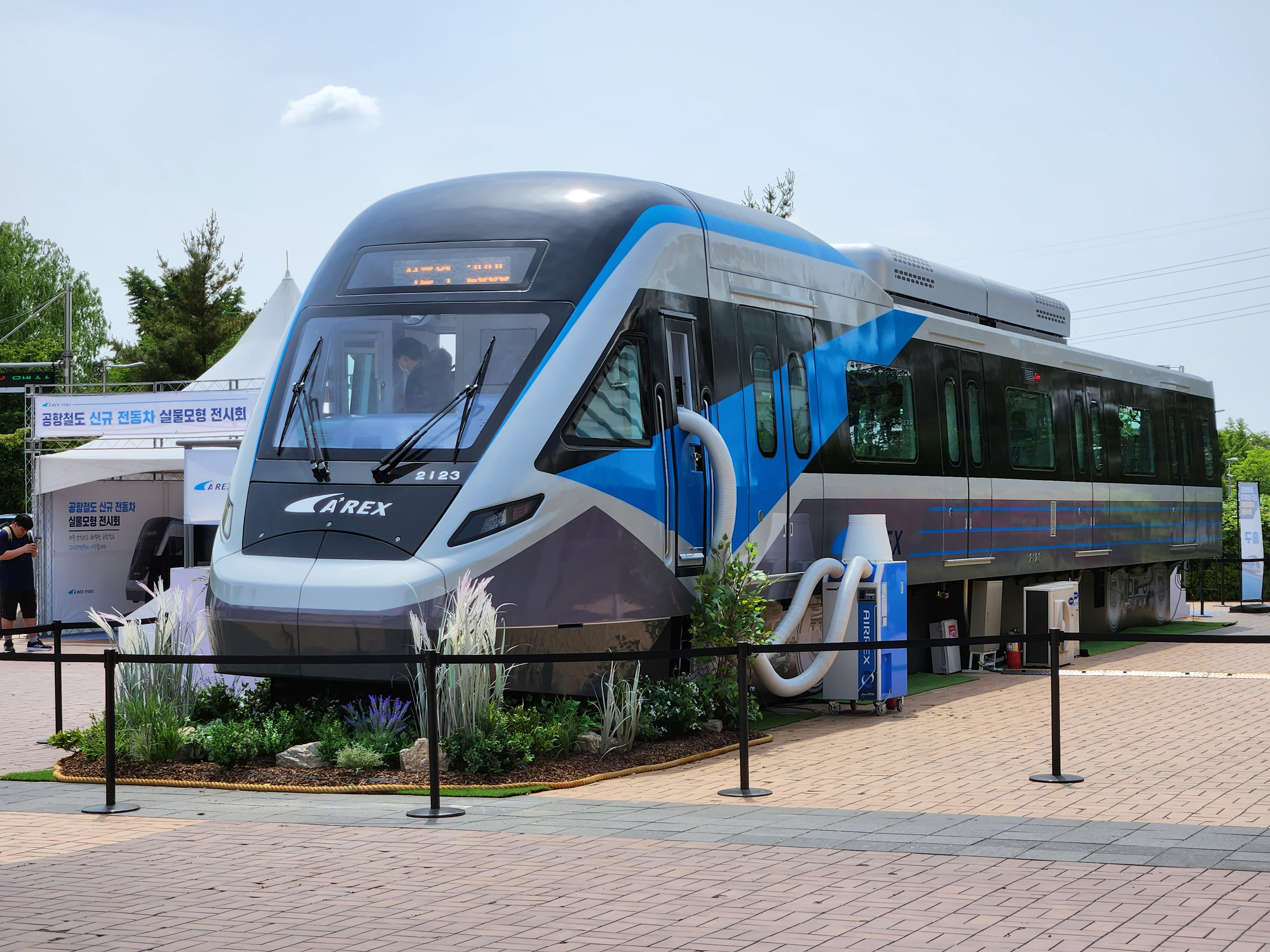
Mockup of a 2000 series car with updated design
