= AREX =

Airport express rail line in South Korea

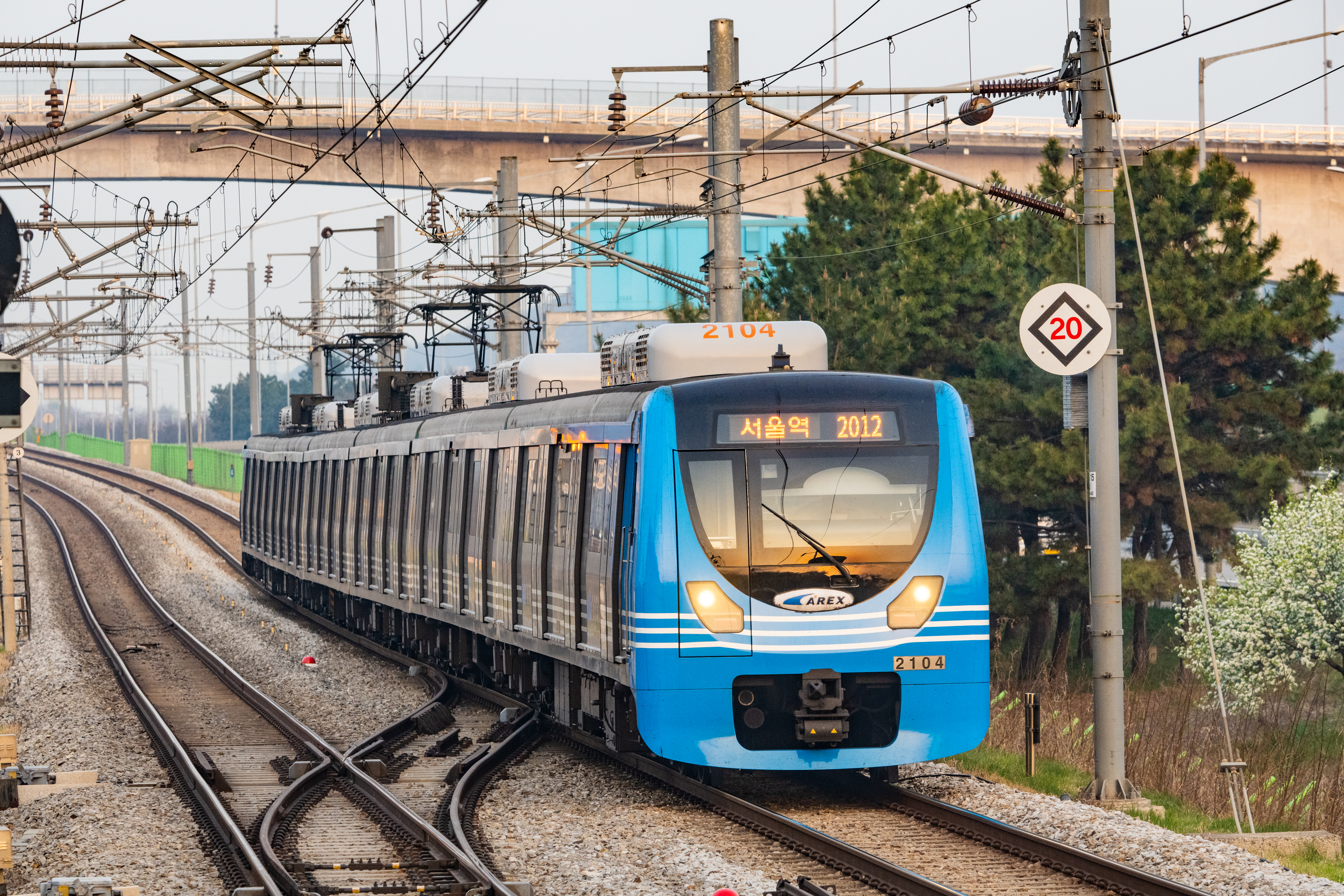

Overview
- Status: Operational
- Owner: Korea Rail Network Authority
- Termini: Seoul Station; Geomam / Incheon Int'l Airport Terminal 2
- Stations: 14

Service
- Type: Commuter Rail
- System: Seoul Metropolitan Subway
- Operator(s): Airport Railroad Co., Ltd.
- Depot: Yongyu
- Daily ridership: 182,343

History
- Opened: Phase 1: March 23, 2007; 19 years ago Phase 2: December 29, 2010; 15 years ago Phase 3: September 2018; 8 years ago

Technical
- Line length: 63.8 km (39.6 mi)
- Num of tracks: 2
- Track gauge: 1,435 mm (4 ft 8 1/2 in)
- Electrification: 25 kV 60 Hz AC from overhead catenary
- Operating speed: 110 km/h (68 mph)

- AREX
- Hangul: 인천국제공항철도
- Hanja: 仁川國際空港鐵道
- RR: Incheon gukjegonghang cheoldo
- MR: Inch'ŏn kukchegonghang ch'ŏlto

AREX (Airport Railroad Express; Korean: 인천국제공항철도) is an airport rail link and commuter rail line in the Seoul Metropolitan Area of South Korea, linking Incheon International Airport and Gimpo International Airport with Seoul Station. The section between the two airports opened on March 23, 2007, and the line was extended to Seoul Station on December 29, 2010. The color used for route information for regular trains is a shade of blue called 'sea blue', while for express trains, it is orange.

Long-distance Korea Train Express high speed trains started to use the line from June 30, 2014, but discontinued the service in March 2018 due to low ridership.

== History ==
=== Phase 1 ===
The line was initially announced in July 1998 as the Incheon International Airport Railroad (인천국제공항철도), abbreviated IREX (Incheon Airport Railroad Express) which can be seen on the railings of overhead crossings by the line. The project was launched as South Korea's first build-operate-transfer (BOT) franchise. The concession was won by a consortium of 11 Korean companies, which incorporated as the Incheon International Airport Railroad Company (IIARCo) in March 2001. The original main shareholders were Hyundai (27%), POSCO (11.9%), Daelim (10%), Dongbu (10%) and the Korean National Railroad (9.9%).

After significant delays, construction of the line started in 2001, after the opening of Incheon Airport. About 60% of the line is underground, and reaches Incheon International Airport on Yeongjong Island via the lower deck of Yeongjong Bridge, a combined road-rail bridge. IIARCo contracted project management and the supply of equipment and trains, altogether worth about €400 million, to Incheon Korean French Consortium (IKFC). This consortium includes French company Alstom, its South Korean subsidiary Eukorail, and the South Korean rolling stock manufacturing company Rotem, which also supplied the technology for the KTX high-speed rail system.

The line and the operating company was renamed AREX in June 2006. The first 37.6 km (23.4 mi) segment from Incheon International Airport Terminal 1 to Gimpo International Airport opened on March 23, 2007. This makes AREX the first dedicated airport rail link and the second railway line in the Korean Peninsula (after Seoul Subway Line 5) to directly serve an airport.

In March 2009, Korail acquired an 88.8% share of the company. Upon the acquisition, the operating company changed its name to Korail Airport Railroad as of November 30, 2009.

=== Phase 2 ===
Phase 2 of the line runs from Gimpo International Airport to Seoul Station, which increased the length to 58 km (36 mi). At Gimpo the line is underground, rising to the surface to cross the Han River on the Magok Railway Bridge before descending underground for the final time. This section was built in a cut and cover tunnel running parallel to Susaek and Gajwa before connecting with Hongik University and Gongdeok, then diving to terminate deep underground on the west side of Seoul Station. The second phase opened for regular service on December 29, 2010, with the exception of Gongdeok station, which was planned to open around early 2011, but was delayed to November 29, 2011.

=== Phase 3 ===
Phase 3 of the line was opened in September 2018. During phase 3 Magongnaru station was opened.

=== Further extensions and improvements ===
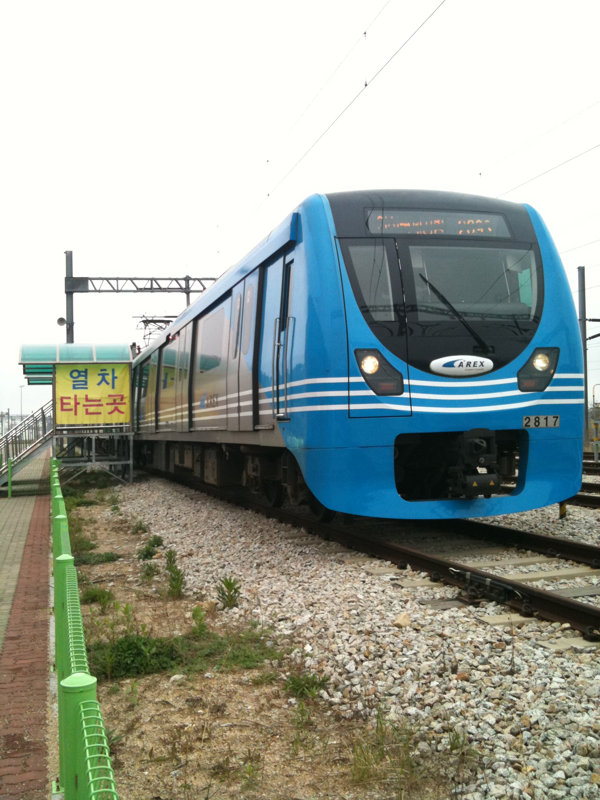
AREX 2000 series EMU at Yongyu Station in 2011, in use as temporary base station

The city of Incheon requested that AREX add three new stations at Cheongna International City, Yeongjong, and Yongyu. The stations were originally planned to open with the second phase of the line, but were delayed due to delays in the real estate development projects the stations were to serve. Cheongna International City station, located west of Geomam was opened on June 21, 2014. Yeongjong station, located near the eastern part of the airport island, opened on March 26, 2016. The station was constructed as a station shell with two side platforms only, but underwent a conversion to fit in two outer tracks on each platform to allow for bypass moves.

Earlier plans to link Yongsan station have been dropped. However, KTX service began to run from Yongsan Station to Incheon International Airport on June 30, 2014. These trains stop at two stations along the line: Geomam & Incheon International Airport. In March 2018, KTX service to Incheon Airport was suspended due to low ridership. The suspension became permanent in September 2018 as the line was officially abolished.

On September 1, 2010, the South Korean government announced a strategic plan to reduce travel times from Seoul to 95% of the country to under 2 hours by 2020. As part of the plan, the AREX line is to be further upgraded to handle 230 km/h (143 mph) speed limits.

Incheon International Airport opened Terminal 2 on January 18, 2018, though the AREX line was extended to the terminal's station 5 days earlier. This brings the whole line to a length of 63.8 km (39.6 mi).

There is currently a proposal for Seoul Subway Line 9 to combine with the AREX line via a direct connection at the Gimpo International Airport Station starting in 2020, providing a through service from Incheon International Airport to the Gangnam area with a travel time of about one hour.

== Rolling stock ==
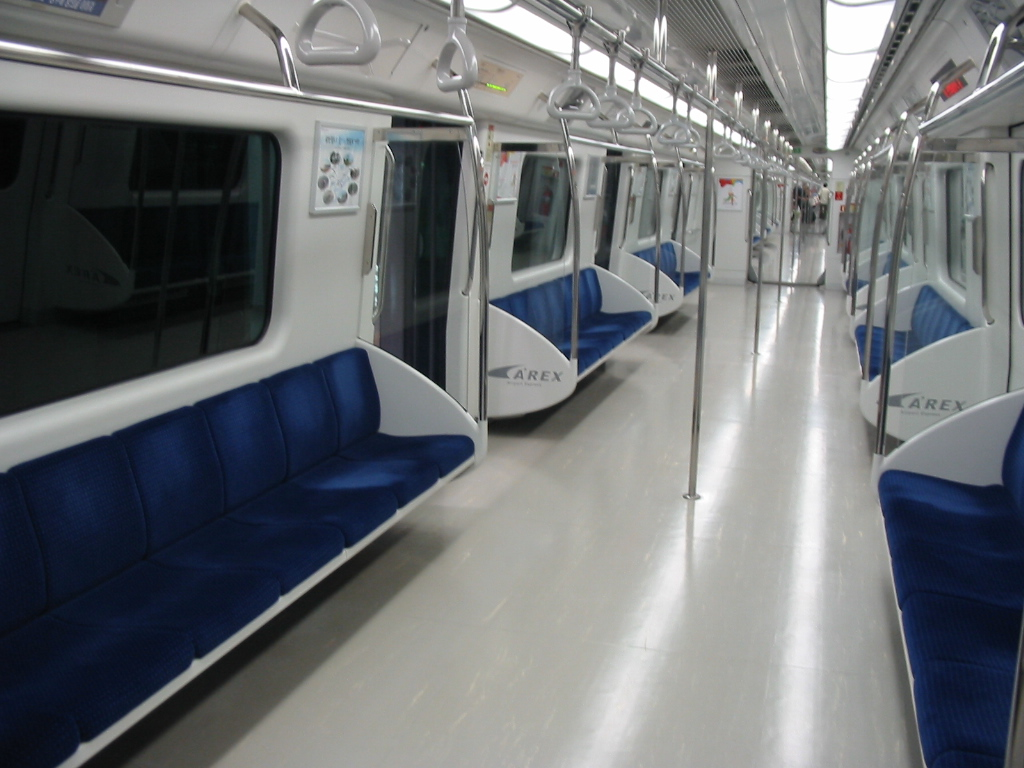
Interior of an AREX 2000 series EMU

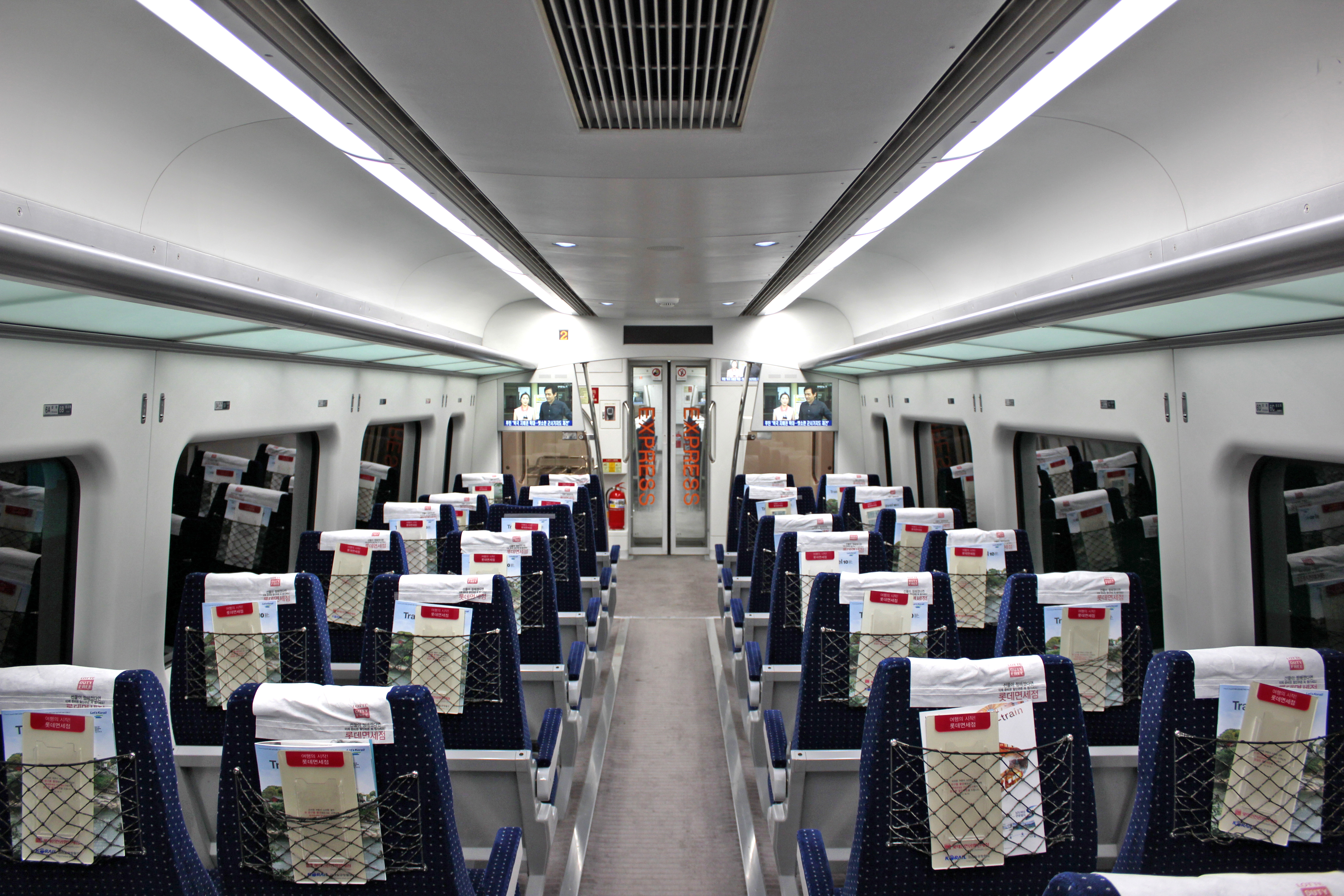
Interior of an AREX 1000 series EMU

Name	Built	Manufacturer	Number built	Notes
AREX Class 1000	2006, 2009	Hyundai Rotem	6	Used on express services
AREX Class 2000 (1st generation)	2005–2006 2009-2010, 2017	Hyundai Rotem	22	Used on commuter services
AREX Class 2000 (2nd generation)	2025	Hyundai Rotem	9	Used on commuter services

AREX operates two types of trains, one for commuter and one for express services, both supplied by Hyundai Rotem. Three 1000 series express trains and nine 2000 series commuter trains were delivered for phase 1 of the project, and original plans foresaw a doubling of their numbers for the second phase.

Both trains are six-car electric multiple units, which can be expanded to eight cars in the future. End cars and the fourth car are trailers, the second, third and fifth car are powered. The trains have a design speed of 120 km/h (75 mph), but are operated at a maximum 110 km/h (68 mph) on surface tracks and a maximum 100 km/h (62 mph) in tunnels. Each car has a length of 19.95 m (65 ft 5 in) and a width of 3.12 m (10 ft 3 in), with a carbody made of aluminium. The commuter version has four pairs of sliding doors on each side of each car, the express version has two pairs of sliding doors on each side of each car.

Express trains have 272 high-back forward and rear-facing seats with armrests in a 2+2 configuration, as well as overhead luggage shelves, additional luggage racks, an onboard restroom, and complimentary WiFi. The transition between cars are separated by transparent sliding doors.

Commuter trains are similar to regular metro trains with seats along the walls but do not have overhead shelves. These are open gangway trains, with no separating doors between cars. Commuter trains offer seating for 282 passengers and standing room for 630 passengers.

Both train types offer disabled seats and are equipped with LCD screens for passenger information, including flight arrivals and departures.

On September 15, 2025, the first of nine additional 2000 series trains began revenue service on the all-stop service. The remaining eight sets are expected to be in service by the end of the year.

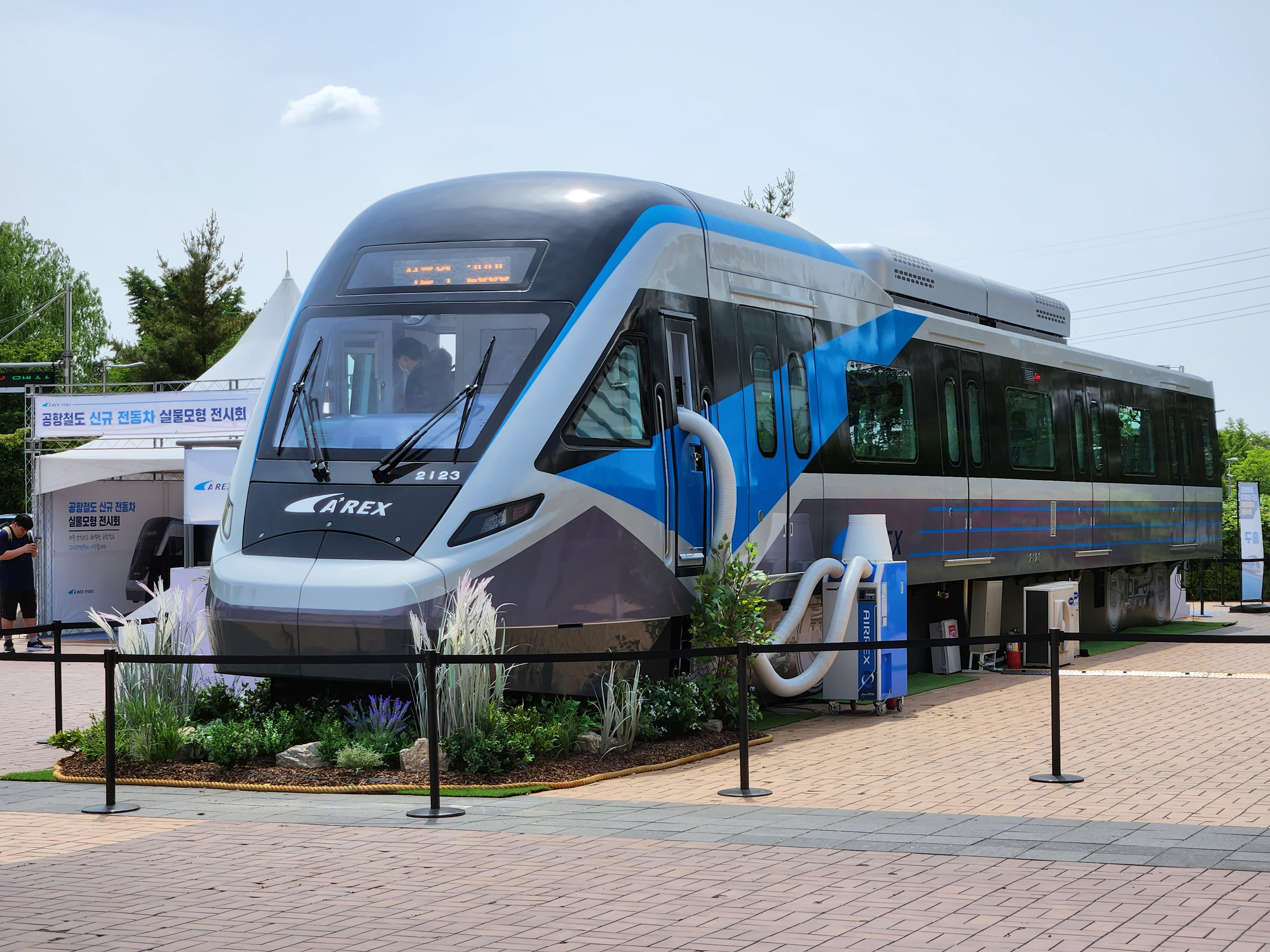
Mockup of a 2000 series car with updated design

== Operation ==
=== Services ===
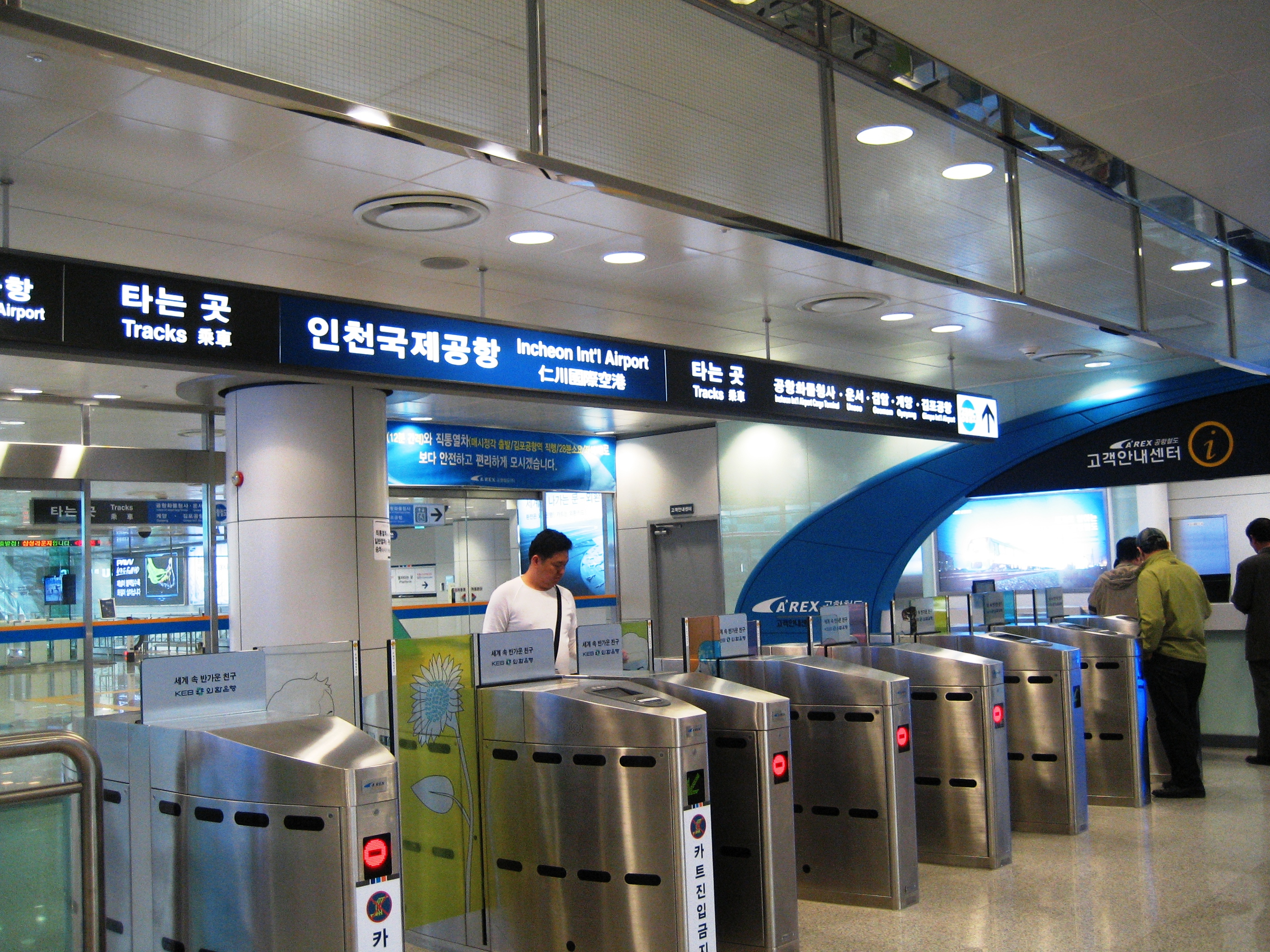
Ticketing gate, AREX Incheon International Airport station

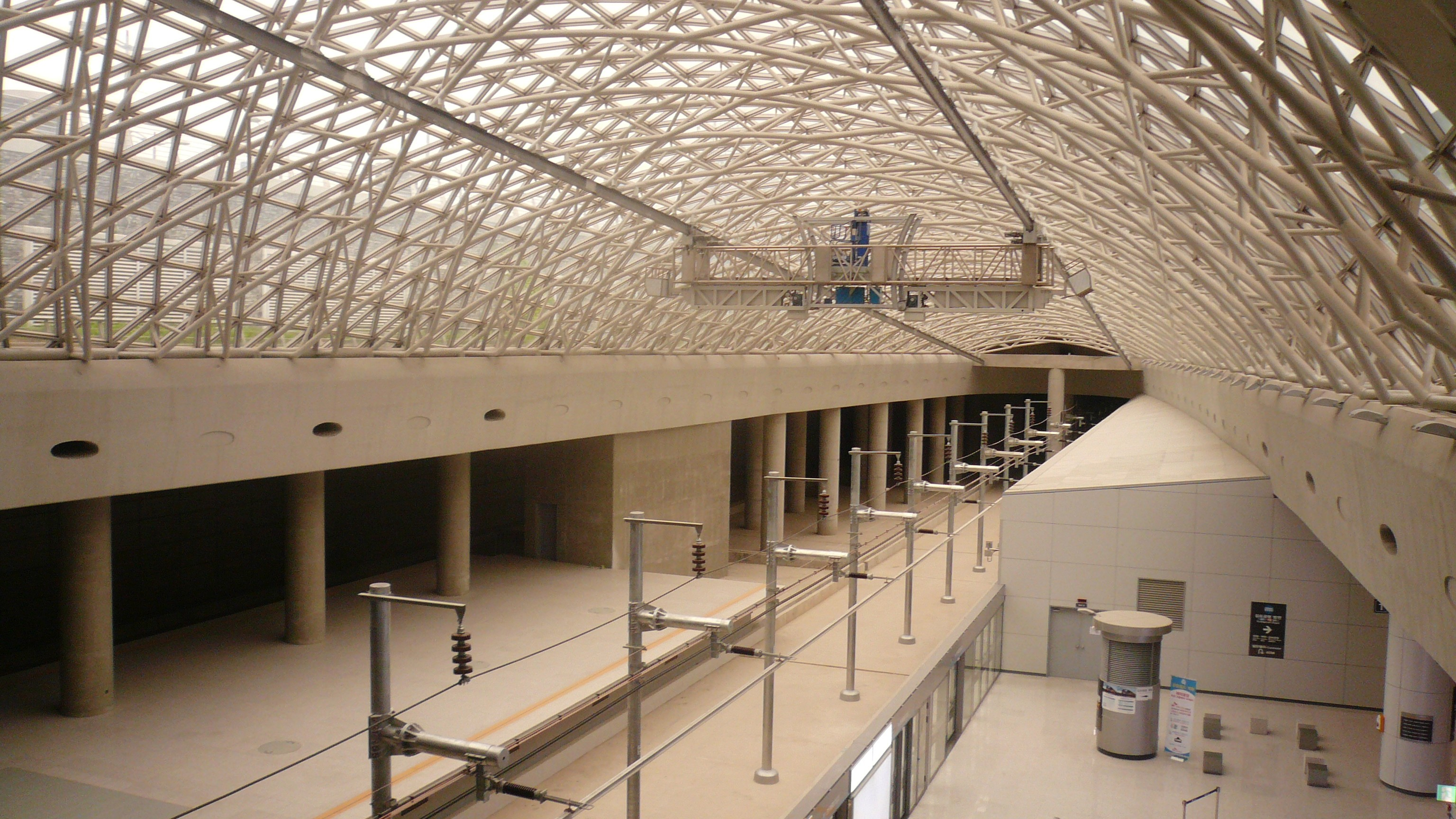
View of the Terminal 1 station at Incheon International Airport.

Both non-stop Express and all-stops commuter services are operated. With the opening of the first phase, journeys from Incheon International Airport to Gimpo International Airport took 28 minutes on express services and 33 minutes on commuter services. Following the opening of the second phase, Seoul–Incheon International Airport travel time on half-hourly Express services is 43 minutes to Terminal 1. The all-stops commuter service, which runs at a frequency of up to one train every 6 minutes, takes 53 minutes. This compares with an average travel time of 70 minutes on buses and 60 minutes in taxis or private cars.

Express train passengers boarding certain airlines can check in to their flights at the Seoul Station City Airport Terminal on the western side of Seoul Station, which include facilities to check in and x-ray baggage, receive exit stamps from an onsite Korean Immigration Service officer, and permit expedited security screening once at Incheon.

The AREX line is shown on Seoul subway maps as sky blue, often bisected with orange striping. AREX was originally not considered part of the subway network, but following the majority buyout by Korail, who operates many of Seoul's subway lines, the commuter line was fully integrated with the rest of the Seoul Metropolitan Subway system. There are now free transfers for all Seoul and Incheon metro lines it crosses paths with.

==== AREX Express trains ====
AREX Express train stations and ticket windows are easily by their distinct orange color scheme. AREX Express trains offer 2+2 configured reclining seating, ample luggage storage, free WiFi, onboard service attendants and electronic entertainment screens. AREX Express passengers have access to connecting shuttle buses at Seoul Station to partner hotels, to a dedicated boarding lounge at Incheon Airport Terminal 1, and exclusive use of Seoul Station's City Airport Terminal when departing. All seats on the AREX Express trains are reserved, with receipts displaying the assigned car and seat numbers for passengers alongside their tickets.

==== Gimpo International Airport ====
AREX-Express trains do not stop at Gimpo International Airport. To access Gimpo International Airport from both Seoul Station and Incheon International Airport, passengers need to travel on an all-stops train.

==== KTX ====
The opening of the second phase in 2010 allowed passengers to connect directly from KTX to AREX services at Seoul Station, rather than requiring a subway connection at Gimpo. In November 2013, the AREX-Gyeongui Line direct connection was completed, and on June 30, 2014, KTX trains started full service on the AREX line to Incheon. The expected travel time at construction was 2 hours 41 minutes to Busan and 3 hours to Gwangju, but as of 2015, actual travel times were roughly 3 hours to Gwangju and slightly over 3.5 to Busan.

In late March 2018, KTX service to and from the airport was suspended because of low ridership and the suspension became permanent in September 2018 as the line was officially abolished. At the time of the 2018 Winter Olympics, the Korean Ministry of Land, Infrastructure and Transport reported at 15% demand on weekdays.

=== Fares ===
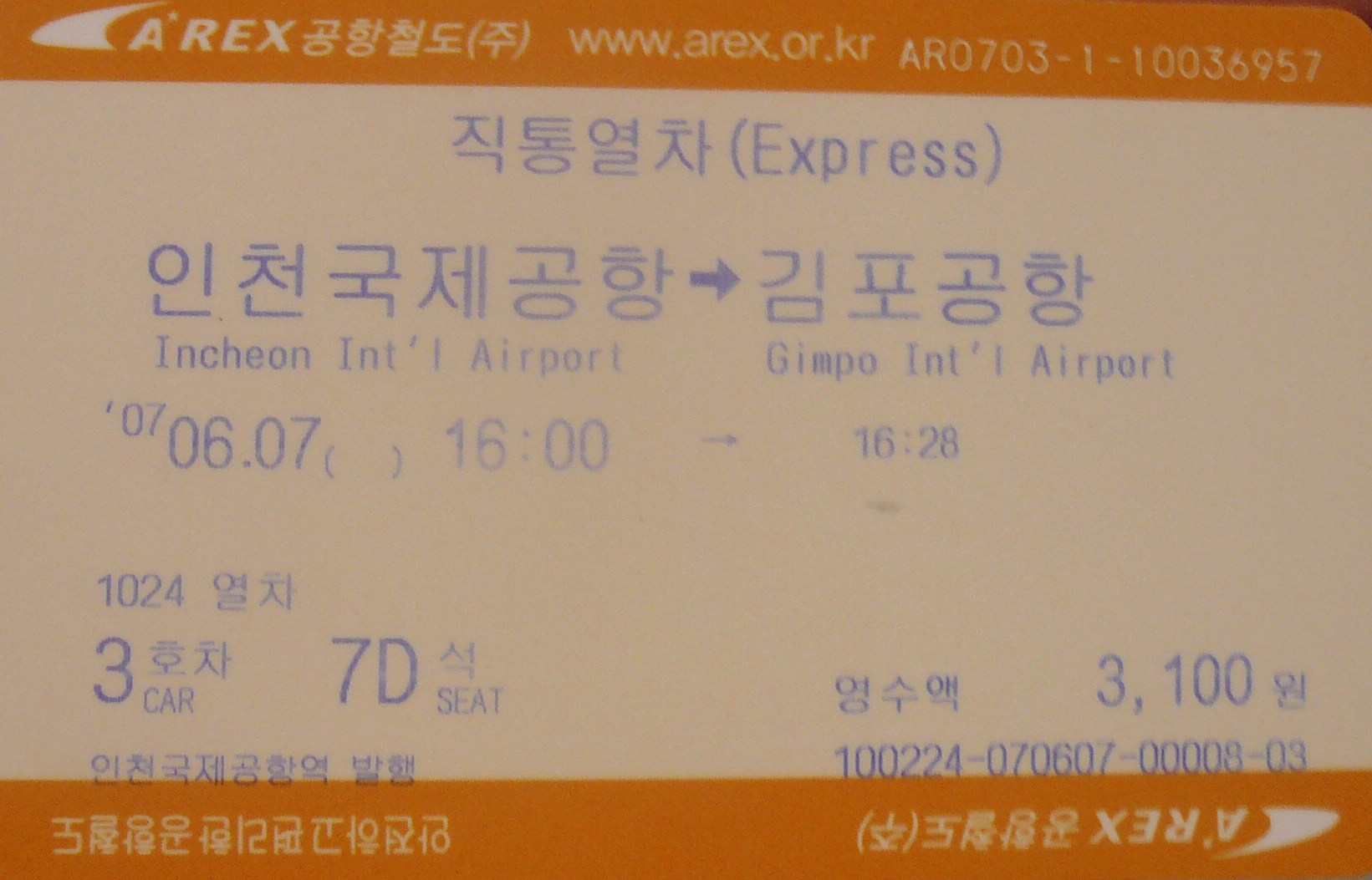
AREX Express ticket

After the opening of the first phase, in 2007, a ticket for a ride from Gimpo International Airport to Incheon International Airport cost ₩3,100, both on commuter and express services. This fare increased in steps to ₩3,500 by the end of 2010, then was reduced to ₩3,300 for commuter trains when the second phase opened. The fare for express services, which travel the full Seoul–Incheon International Airport distance non-stop from the opening of the second phase in December 2010, was set at ₩13,300; while the fare for commuter services on the full distance was set at ₩3,700. This competes against a price of around ₩10,000 on buses, ₩67,500 on taxis, and about ₩15,500 with private car.

By 2022, the fares for the full length of the AREX line settled on ₩4,750 for commuter trains, and ₩9,500 for Express service and both require an additional ₩500 deposit if traveling by a single use card.

Vending machines for local trains accept Korean Won only. Vending machines for Express train tickets take Korean Won and Korean credit cards. Passengers travelling with foreign credit cards must purchase their tickets from staffed ticket windows.

=== Ridership ===
After the opening of the first phase, ridership was initially been far below expectations. Actual ridership in 2008 was around 16,000 passengers/day, or only around 7% of the forecast 230,000, necessitating subsidies of ₩166 billion. Hyundai had originally forecast ridership of up to 490,000/day when the link to Seoul Station is completed. However, ridership rose significantly after the start of service on the second phase of the line to Seoul Station. As early as the first week, average daily ridership more than doubled, from 27,210 to 58,000.

As of September 2013, the all-stops commuter service has approximately 150,000 passengers per day, while the non-stop express service sees only around 2,000 passengers.

== Stations ==
Station		Stopping pattern		Connecting services	Distance		Location	
#	Name (Hangul, Hanja)	Commuter 일반	Express 직통	Connecting services	Station (km)	Line (km)	Location	
A01	Seoul Station (서울역) (Note: The Hanja name of these stations consists of the Hangul name suffixed by the character 驛 or 역 in Hangul.)	◉	◉	Mugunghwa-ho and ITX-Saemaeul services	---	0.0	Yongsan District	Seoul
A02	Gongdeok (공덕, 孔德)	◉	↕	Gyeongui–Jungang Line	3.3	3.3	Mapo District	Seoul
A03	Hongik Univ. (홍대입구, 弘大入口)	◉	↕	Gyeongui–Jungang Line	2.8	6.1	Mapo District	Seoul
A04	Digital Media City (디지털미디어시티)	◉	↕	Gyeongui–Jungang Line	3.4	9.5	Eunpyeong District	Seoul
A042	Magongnaru (마곡나루, 麻谷나루)	◉	↕	Seoul Subway Line 9	8.6	18.1	Gangseo District	Seoul
A05	Gimpo Int'l Airport (김포공항, 金浦空港)	◉	↕	Gimpo Goldline Seohae Line	2.3	20.4	Gangseo District	Seoul
A06	Gyeyang (계양, 桂陽)	◉	↕	Incheon Subway Line 1	6.6	27.0	Gyeyang District	Incheon
A07	Geomam (검암, 黔岩)	◉	↕	Incheon Subway Line 2	5.5	32.5	Seohae District	Incheon
A071	Cheongna Int'l City (청라국제도시, 靑羅國際都市)	◉	↕	(2029)	4.8	37.3	Seohae District	Incheon
A072	Yeongjong (영종, 永宗)	◉	↕		10.3	47.6	Yeongjong District	Incheon
A08	Unseo (운서, 雲西)	◉	↕		3.5	51.1	Yeongjong District	Incheon
A09	Incheon Int'l Airport Cargo Terminal (공항화물청사, 空港貨物廳舍)	◉	↕		4.3	55.4	Yeongjong District	Incheon
A10	Incheon Int'l Airport Terminal 1 (인천공항1터미널, 仁川空港1터미널)	◉	◉	Incheon Airport Maglev	2.6	58.0	Yeongjong District	Incheon
A11	Incheon Int'l Airport Terminal 2 (인천공항2터미널, 仁川空港2터미널)	◉	◉		5.8	63.8	Yeongjong District	Incheon

== See also ==
- Seoul Station City Airport Terminal
