= Magok Bridge =

Bridge over the Han River in South Korea

Coordinates: 37.5821°N 126.8409°E

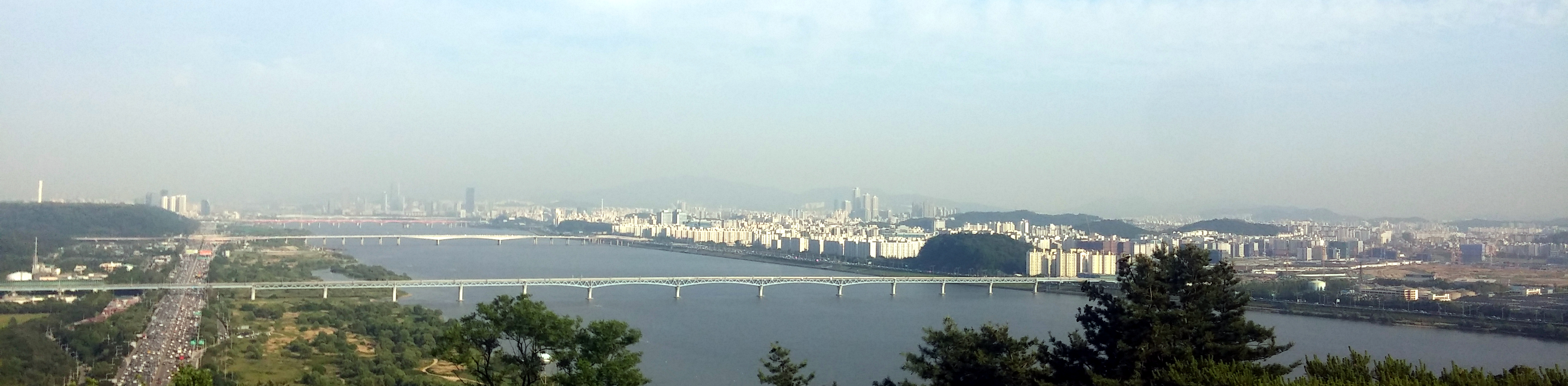

Korean name
- Hangul: 마곡대교
- Hanja: 麻谷大橋
- RR: Magok daegyo
- MR: Magok taegyo

The Magok Bridge (Korean: 마곡대교) crosses the Han River in South Korea as a part of the AREX of the Incheon International Airport. A truss bridge, construction began in January 2004 and finished on December 29, 2010.
