= Incheon International Airport Terminal 2 station =

Metro station in Incheon, South Korea

Coordinates: 37.44745°N 126.45253°E

인천공항2터미널; Incheon Int'l Airport Terminal 2
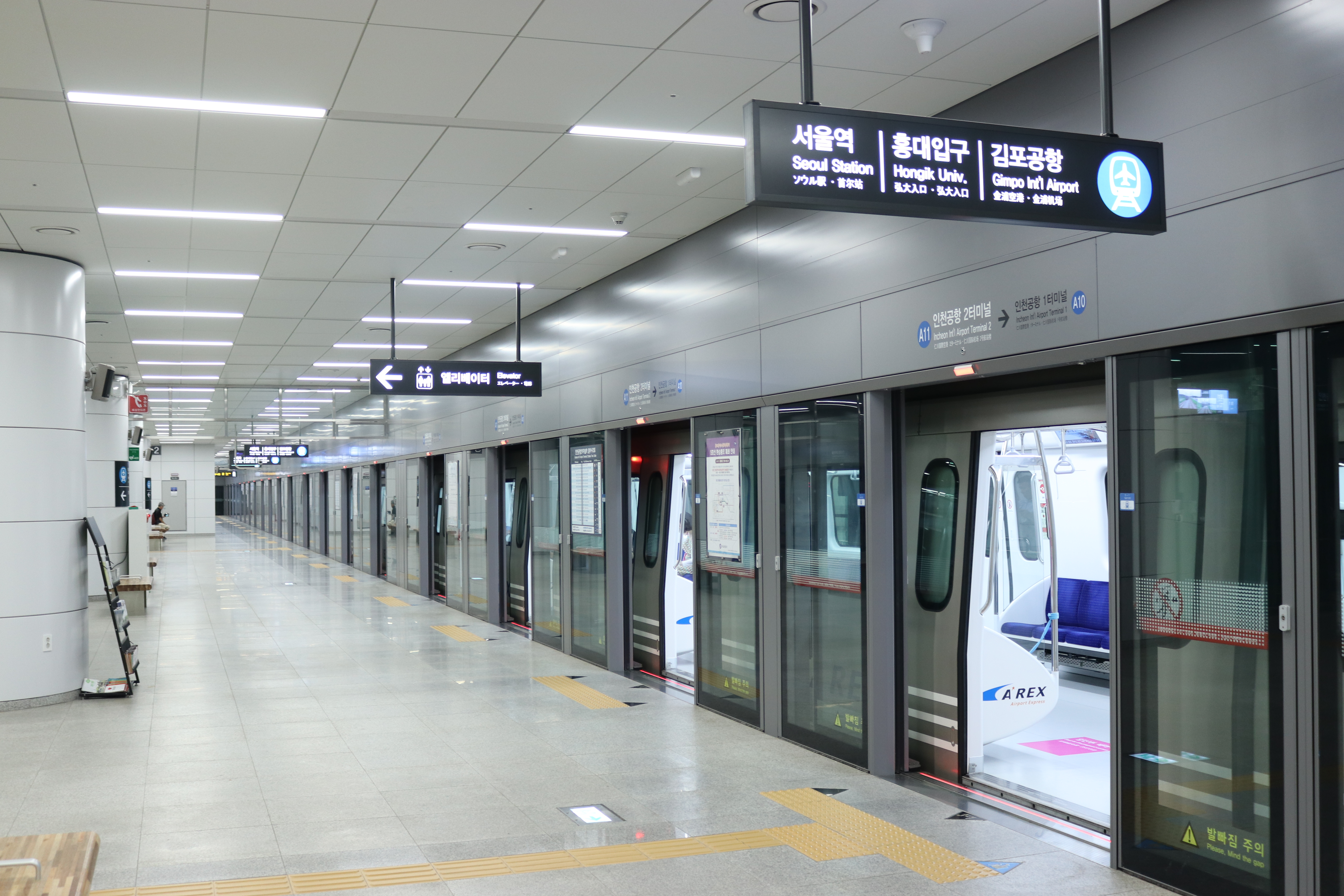
- Incheon International Airport Terminal 2 station platform

Korean name
- Hangul: 인천공항2터미널역
- Hanja: 仁川空港2터미널驛
- Revised Romanization: Incheongonghangiteomineollyeok
- McCune–Reischauer: Inch'ŏn'gonghangit'ŏminŏllyŏk

General information
- Location: 2851 Unseo-dong, 271 Gonghangno, Yeongjong-gu, Incheon
- Operator: Airport Railroad Co., Ltd.
- Line: AREX
- Platforms: 4 (2 island platforms)
- Tracks: 4

Construction
- Structure type: Aboveground

History
- Opened: January 13, 2018

Services
Preceding station	Seoul Metropolitan Subway	Following station
Incheon Int'l Airport Terminal 1 towards Seoul	AREX Local	Terminus
Incheon Int'l Airport Terminal 1 towards Seoul	AREX Express	Terminus
Location

Incheon International Airport Terminal 2 station is a railway station on AREX.

Start of operation January 13, 2018. Location Incheon International Airport Terminal 2 (3 B). By extending the airport railway line to Incheon International Airport Terminal 2. by 5.8 km, a new history was established and business began in January 2018.

It is the westernmost subway station in Korea and is located in Incheon International Airport Terminal 2. Since the existing Incheon International Airport Terminal 1 station had a problem that it was far from the terminal, Passenger Terminal 2 drastically shortened the distance between the railroad station and the passenger terminal. In addition, the bus terminal is operated along with the waiting room for the railway station on the 1st basement floor.

Demand has recovered normally since the end of COVID-19, and the utilization rate is increasing.

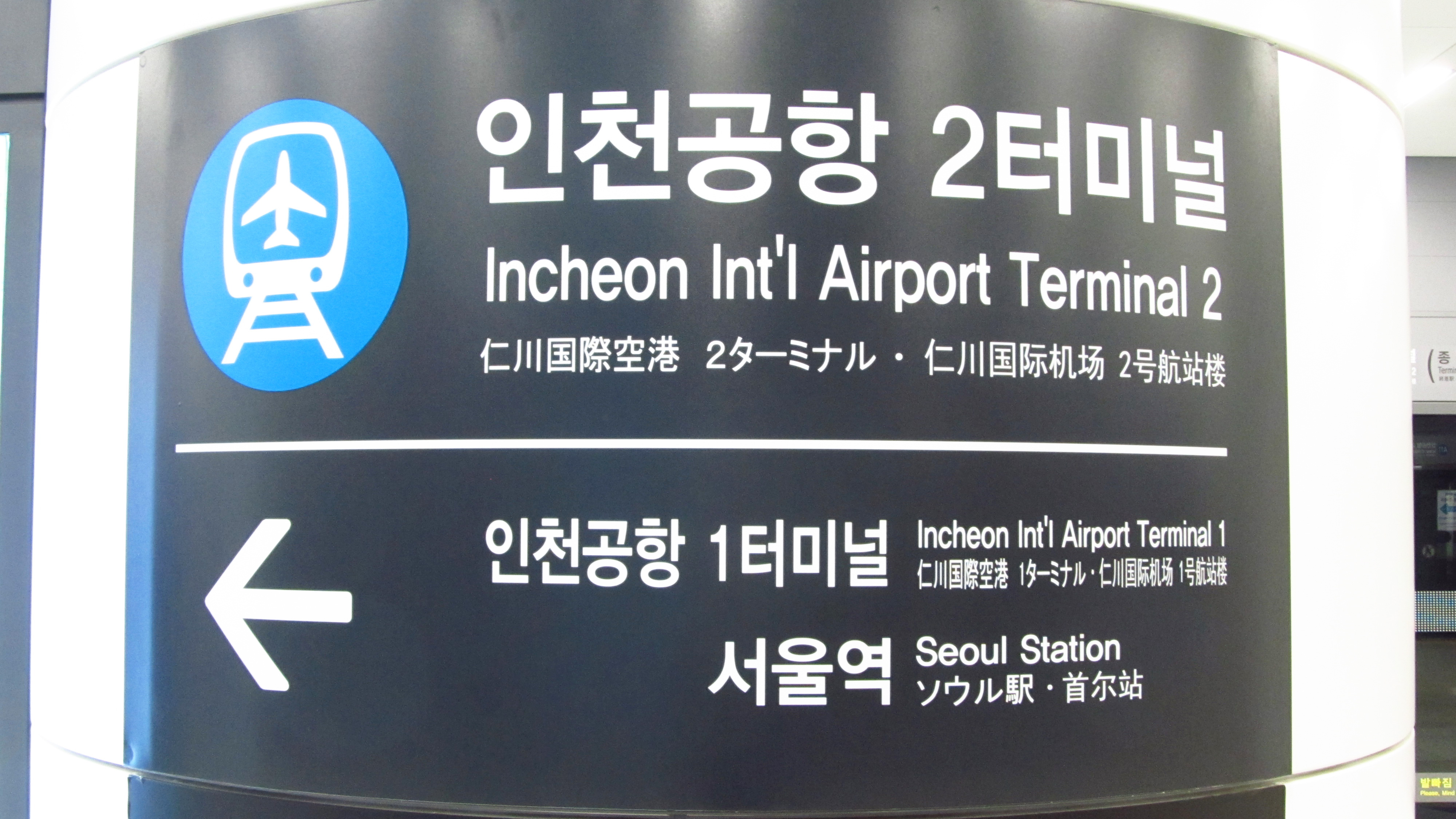
Station name sign

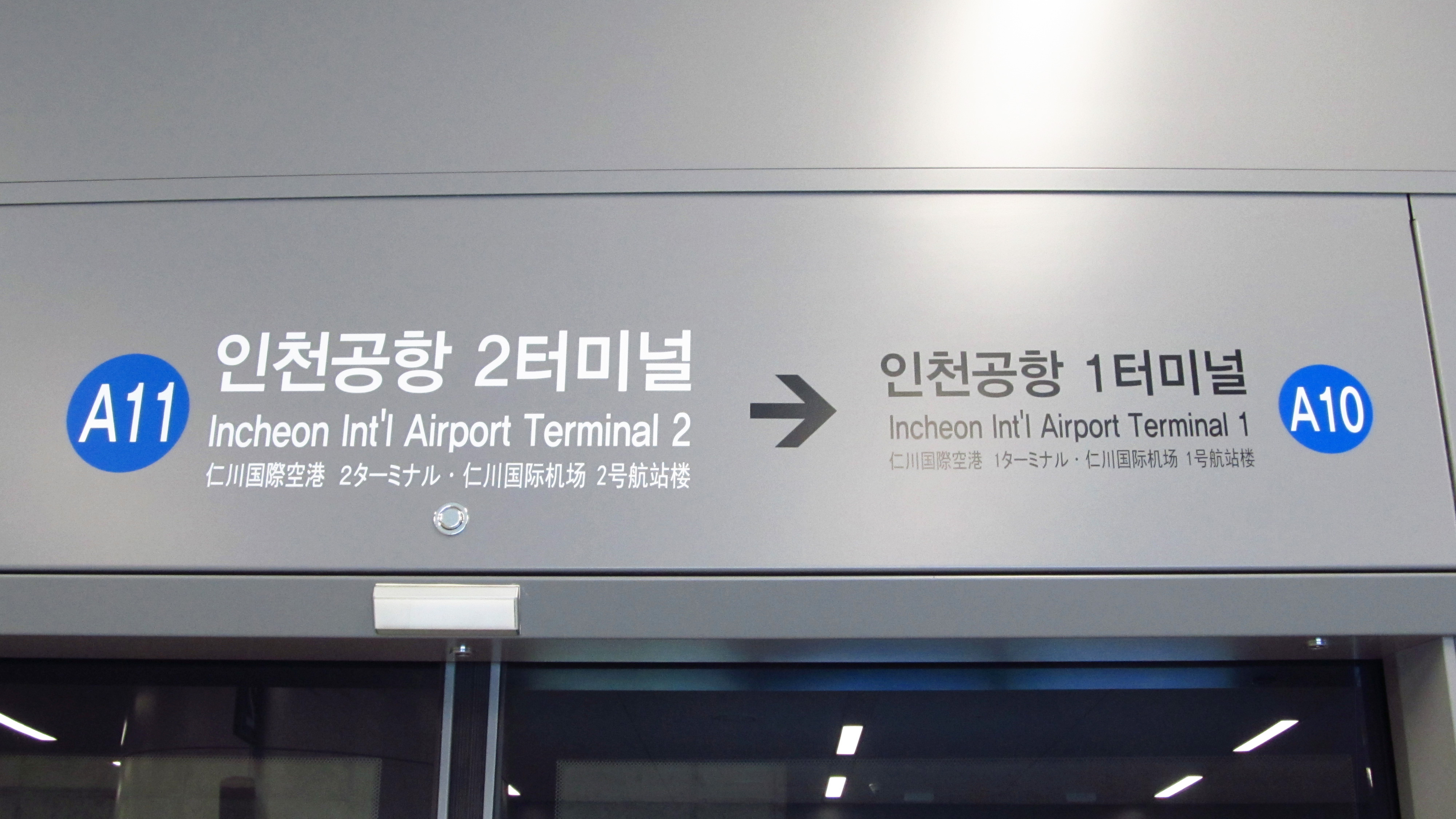
The sign above the platform screen doors

== Photos ==
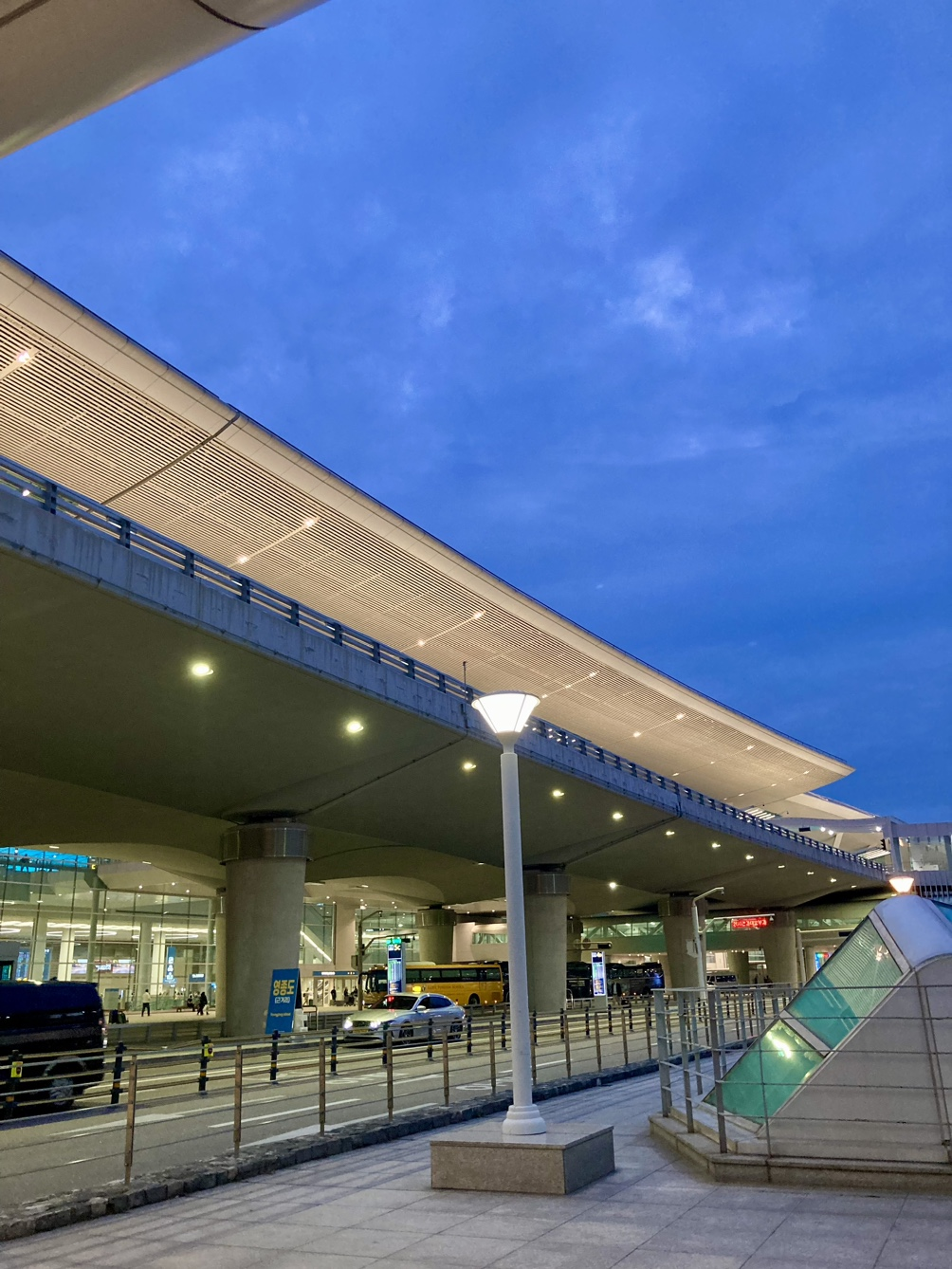
Terminal 2 at night

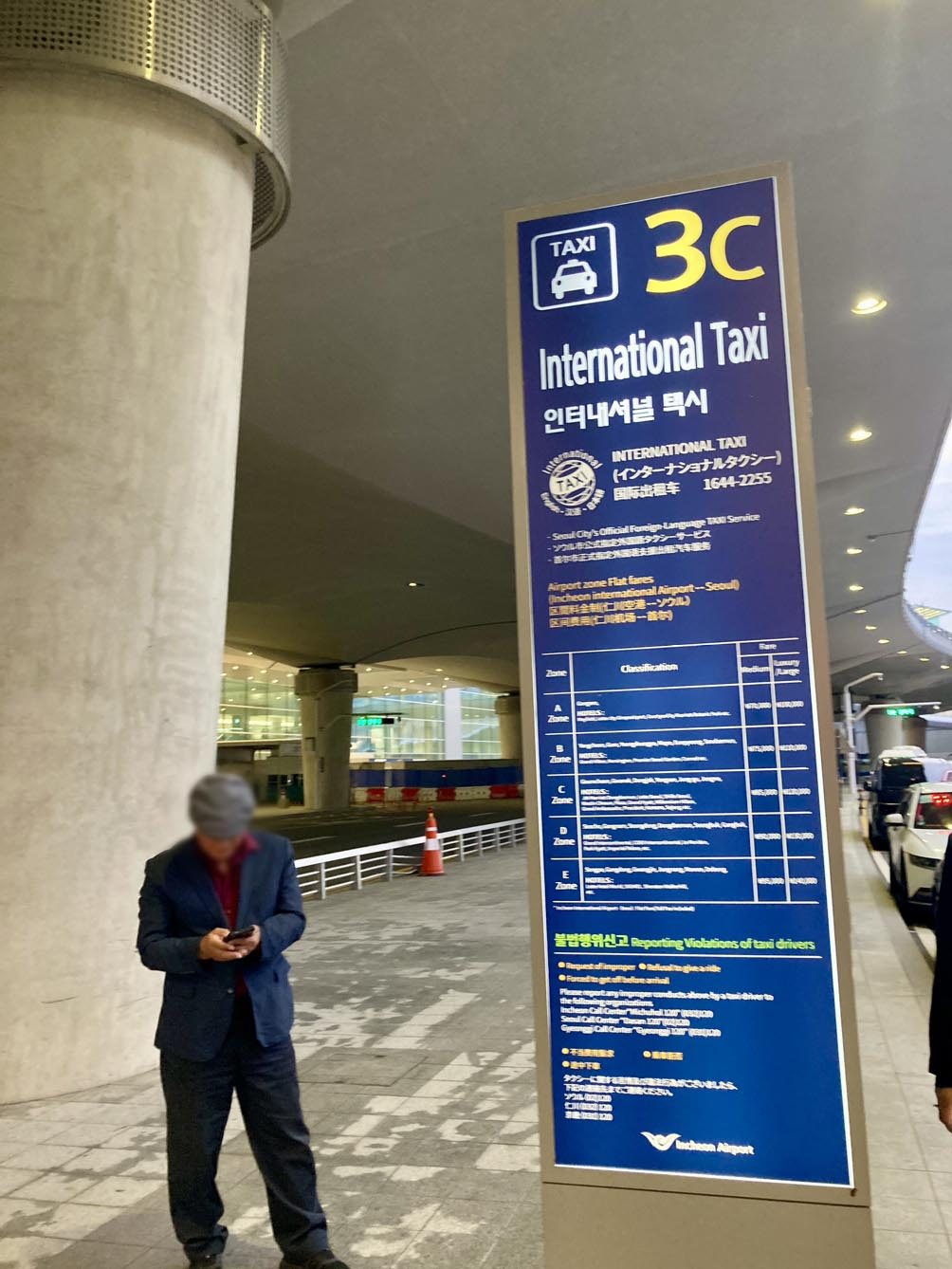
International Taxis

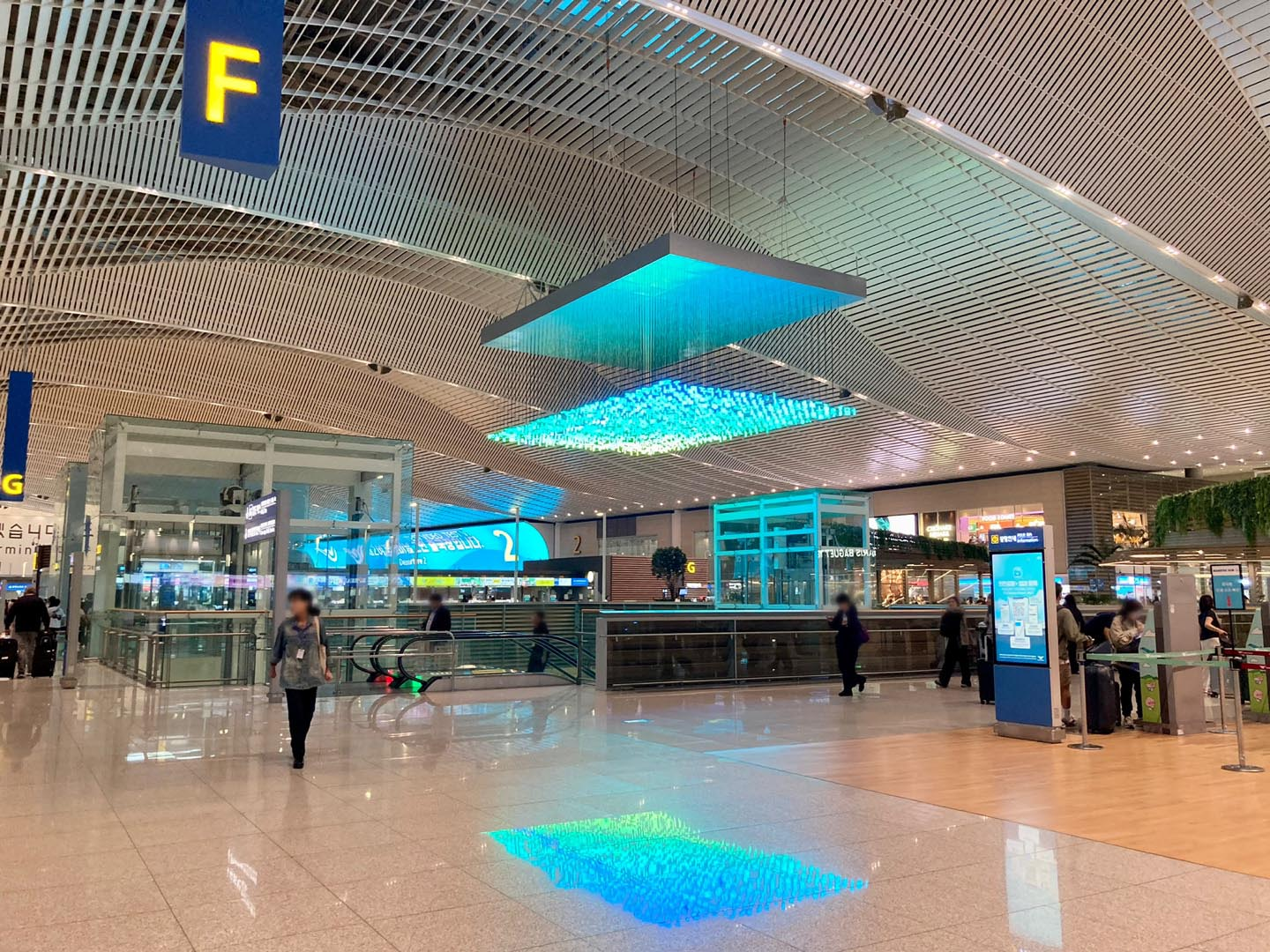
F Ticket Check-in

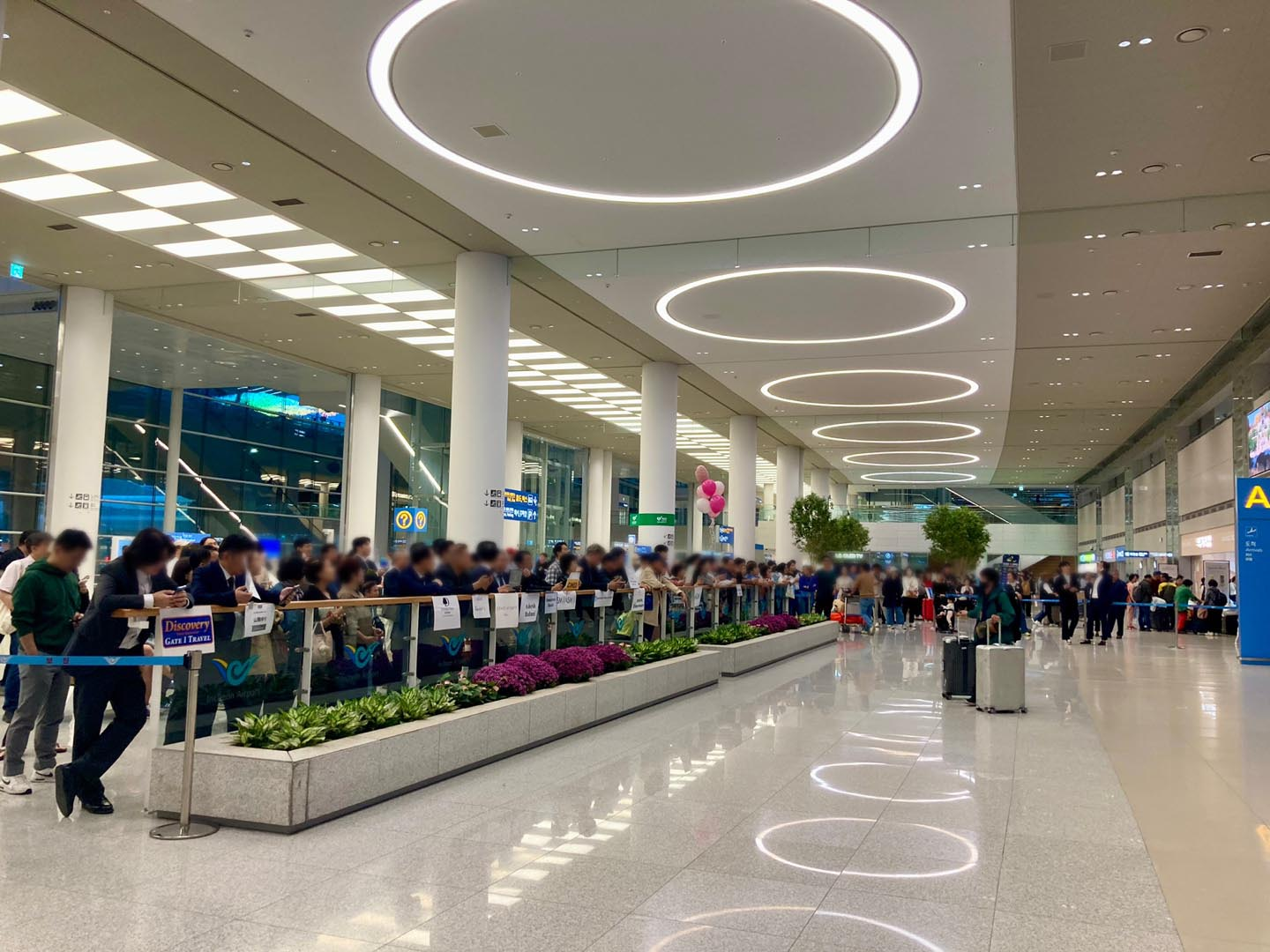
Waiting / Arrivals

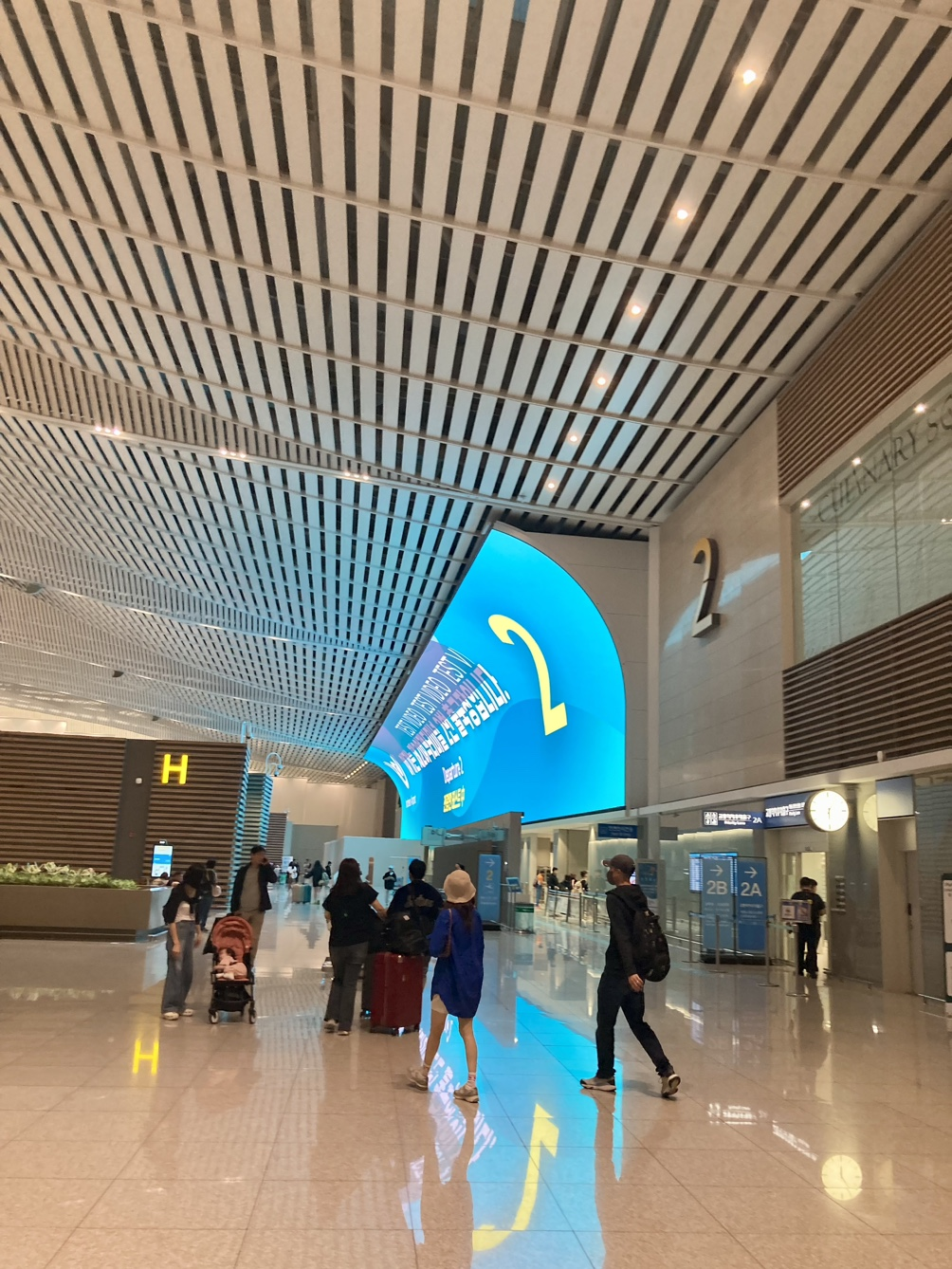
Departures

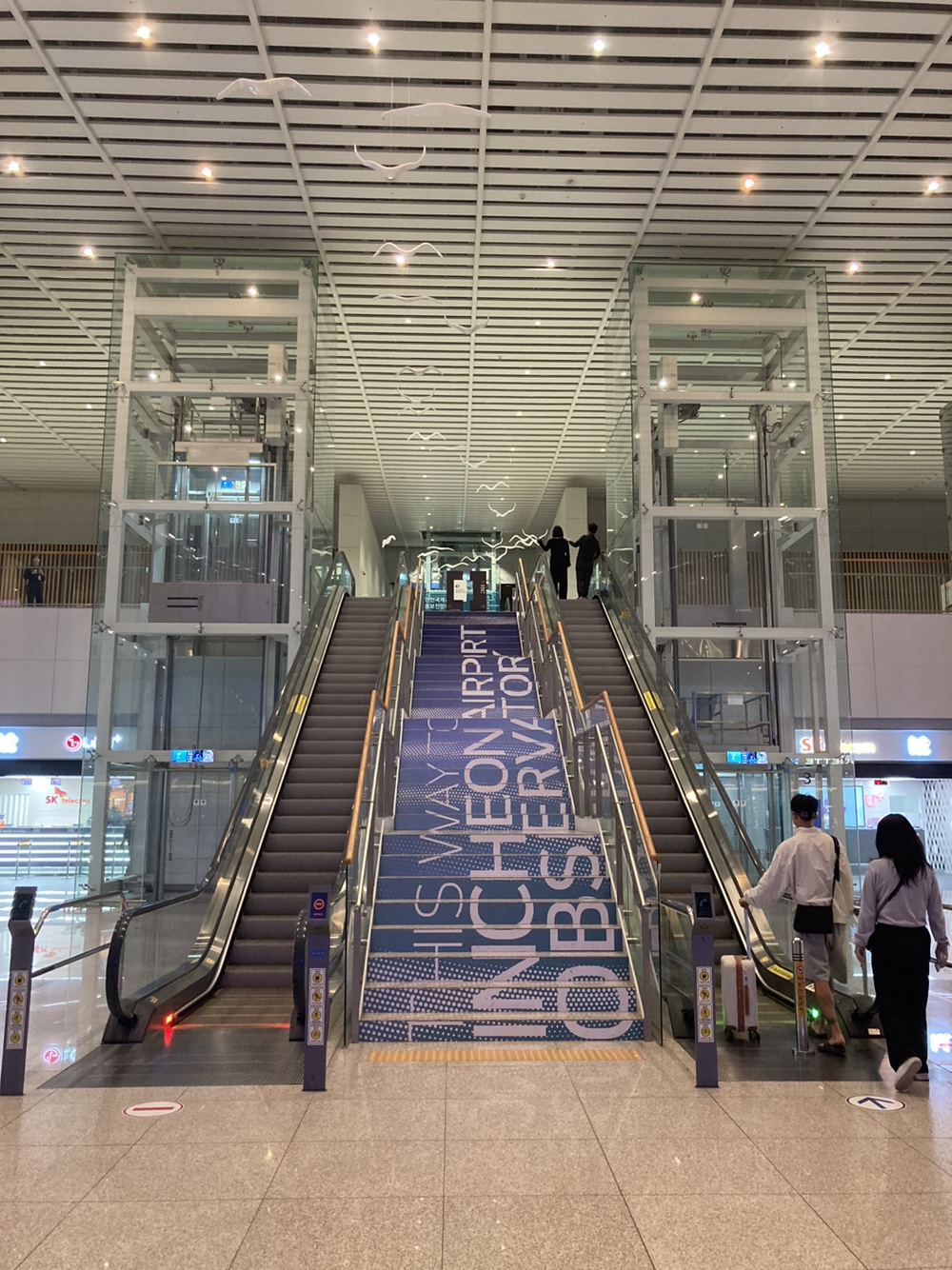
Steps

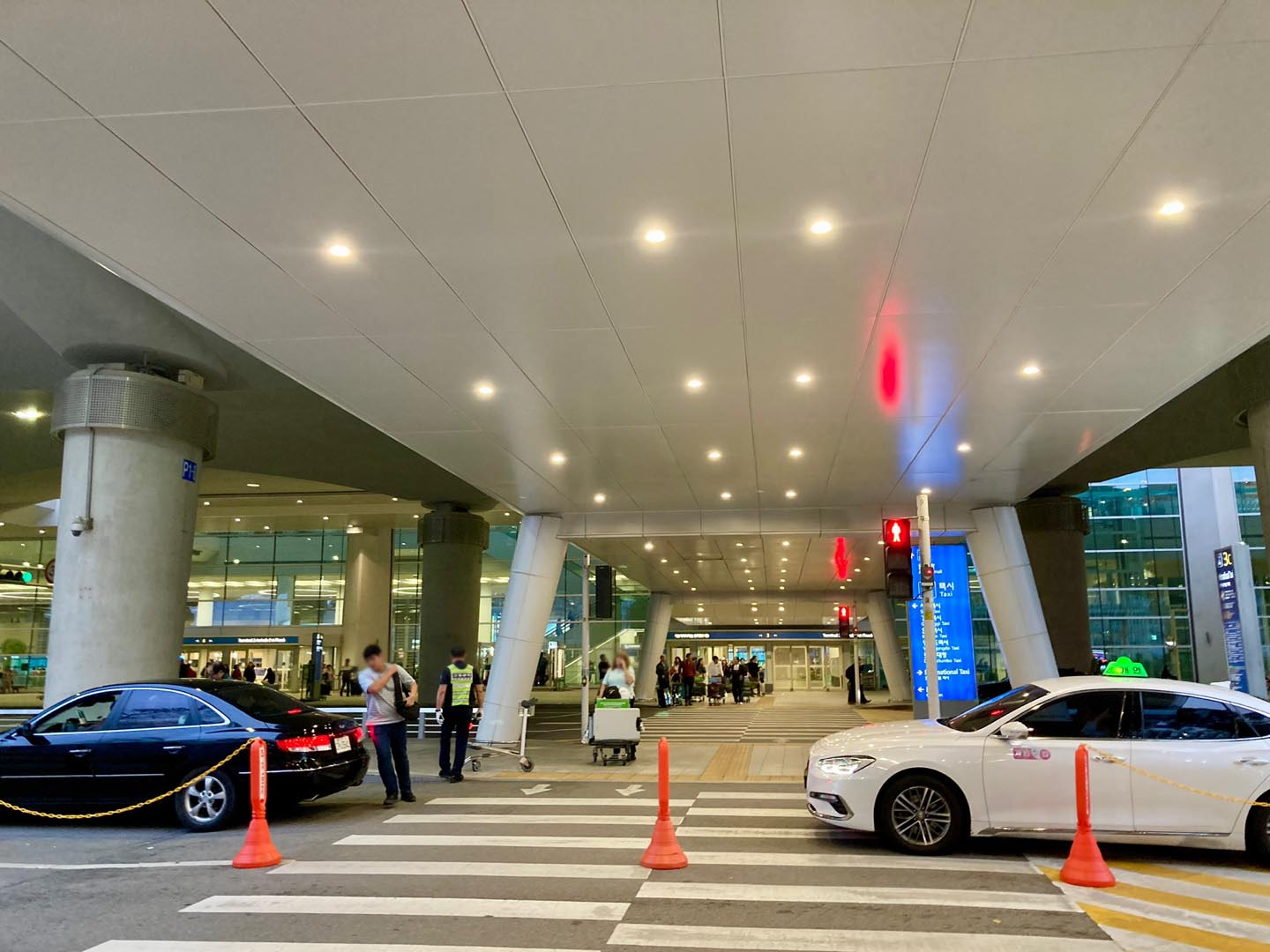
Main Entrance

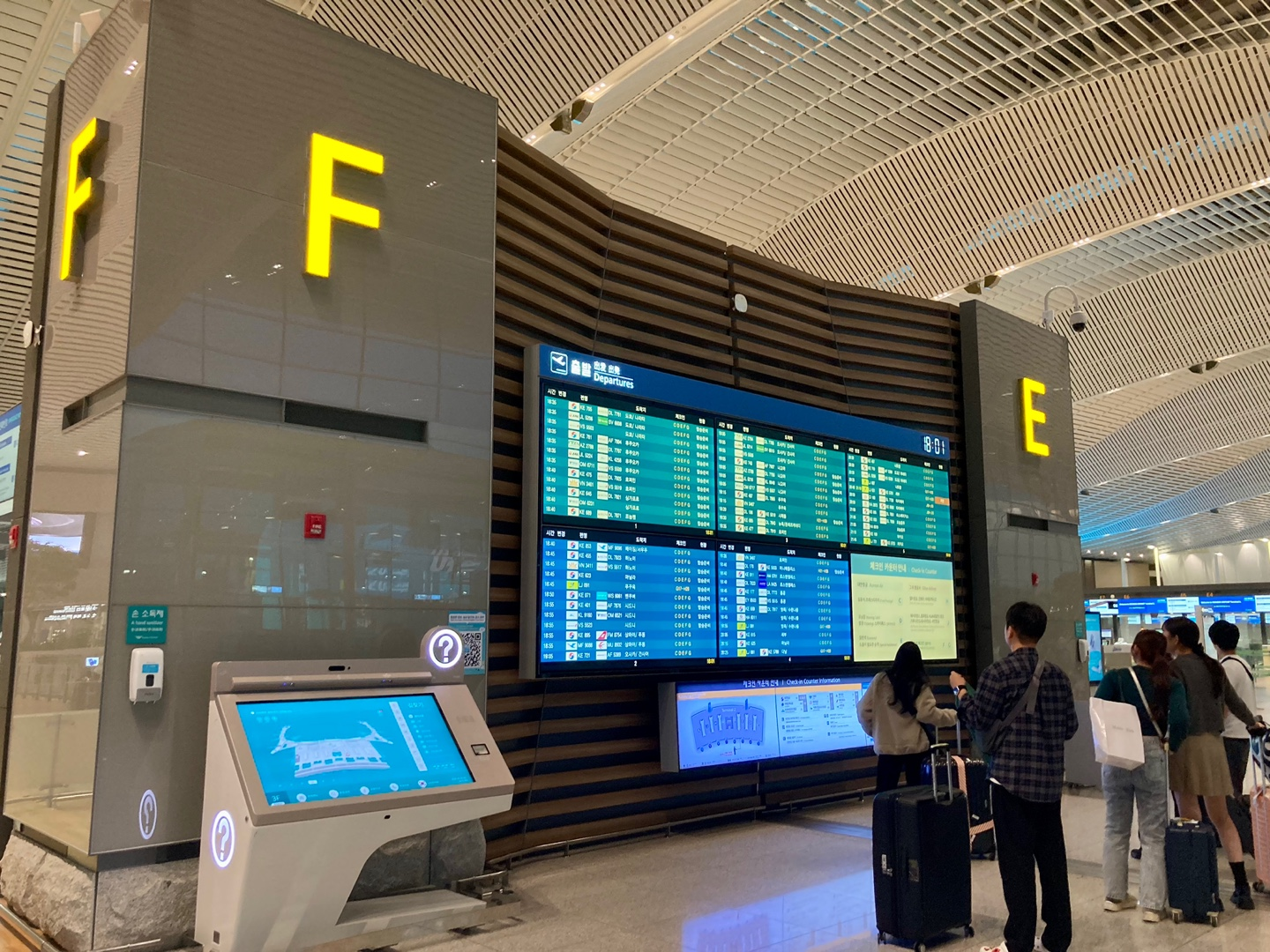
F Ticket Check-in

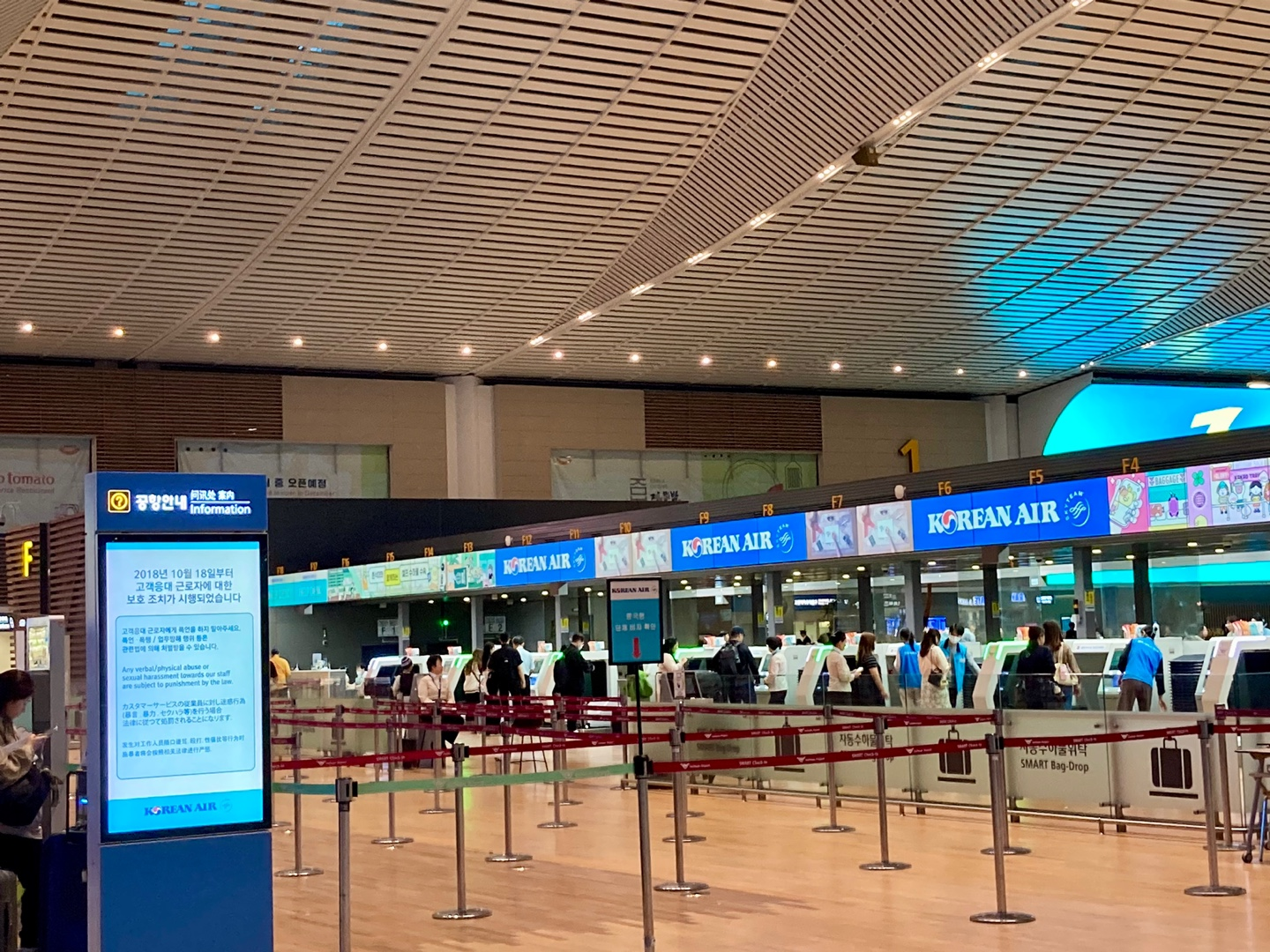
Departure & Ticketing

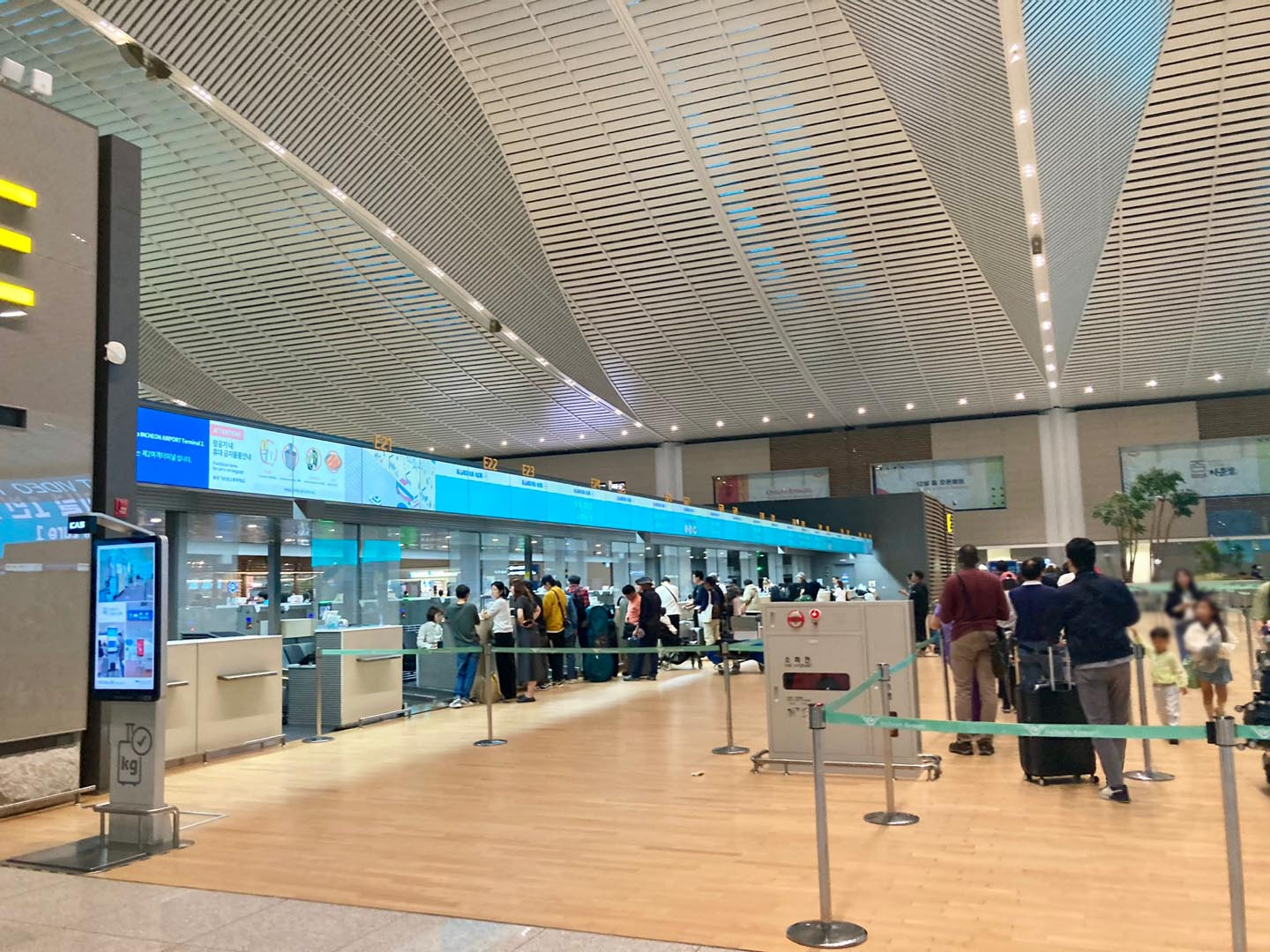
Departure & Ticketing
