= Bae Inkyu =

South Korean antifeminist and YouTuber (1990–2026)

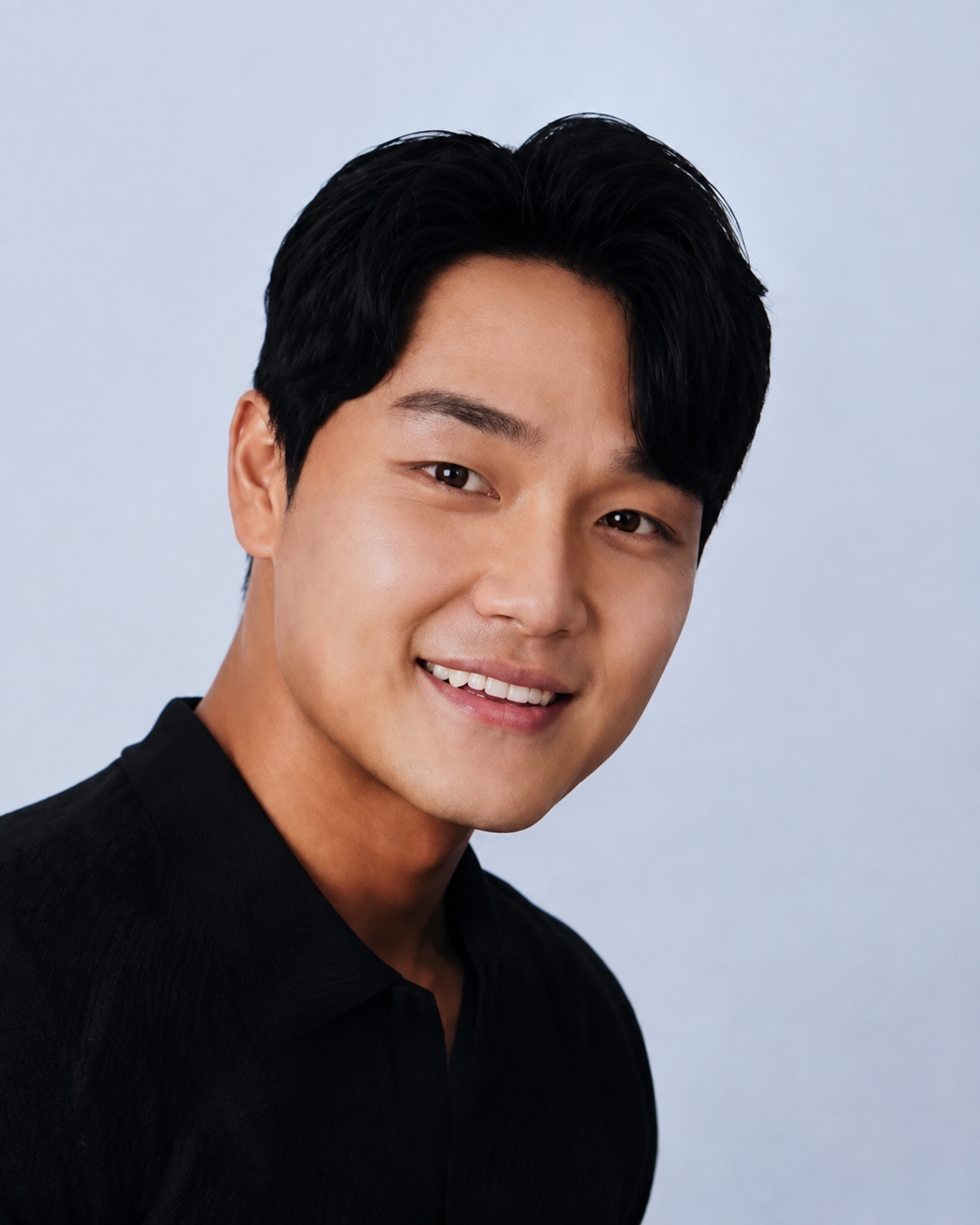
- Born: April 19, 1990
- Died: August 5, 2026 (aged 36); Yeongjongdo, Incheon, South Korea
- Occupation: YouTuber
- Years active: 2021–2026
- Spouse: Song Si-in (div. 2025)
- Children: 1

YouTube information
- Channel: 신 남성연대
- Subscribers: 711,000
- Views: 378,000

Korean name
- Hangul: 배인규
- RR: Bae Ingyu
- MR: Pae In'gyu
- Last updated: August 20, 2026

Bae Inkyu (Korean: 배인규; April 19, 1990 − August 5, 2026) was a South Korean YouTuber and far-right antifeminist activist. He founded the anti-feminist group New Men's Solidarity (신남성연대), and served as its leader from April 2021 until his death.

== Early life and career ==
Bae Inkyu was born on April 19, 1990.

In April 2021, Bae founded the group and YouTube channel New Men's Solidarity, which aimed to defeat feminism. Bae later began holding rallies, speaking against feminism. The group attacked a character from the video game MapleStory (2003).

The channel amassed over 710,000 subscribers, and later made private its videos in 2024 due to legal trouble. In May 2025, Bae was investigated by police in Jung District on the suspicion of methamphetamine.

== Personal life ==
Bae married Song Si-in; they had a son. They divorced in 2025 after Bae assaulted Song. On August 5, 2026, Bae was found dead in his apartment in Yeongjongdo. He was 36. A private funeral was held at Inha University Hospital.
