= Incheon Bridge =

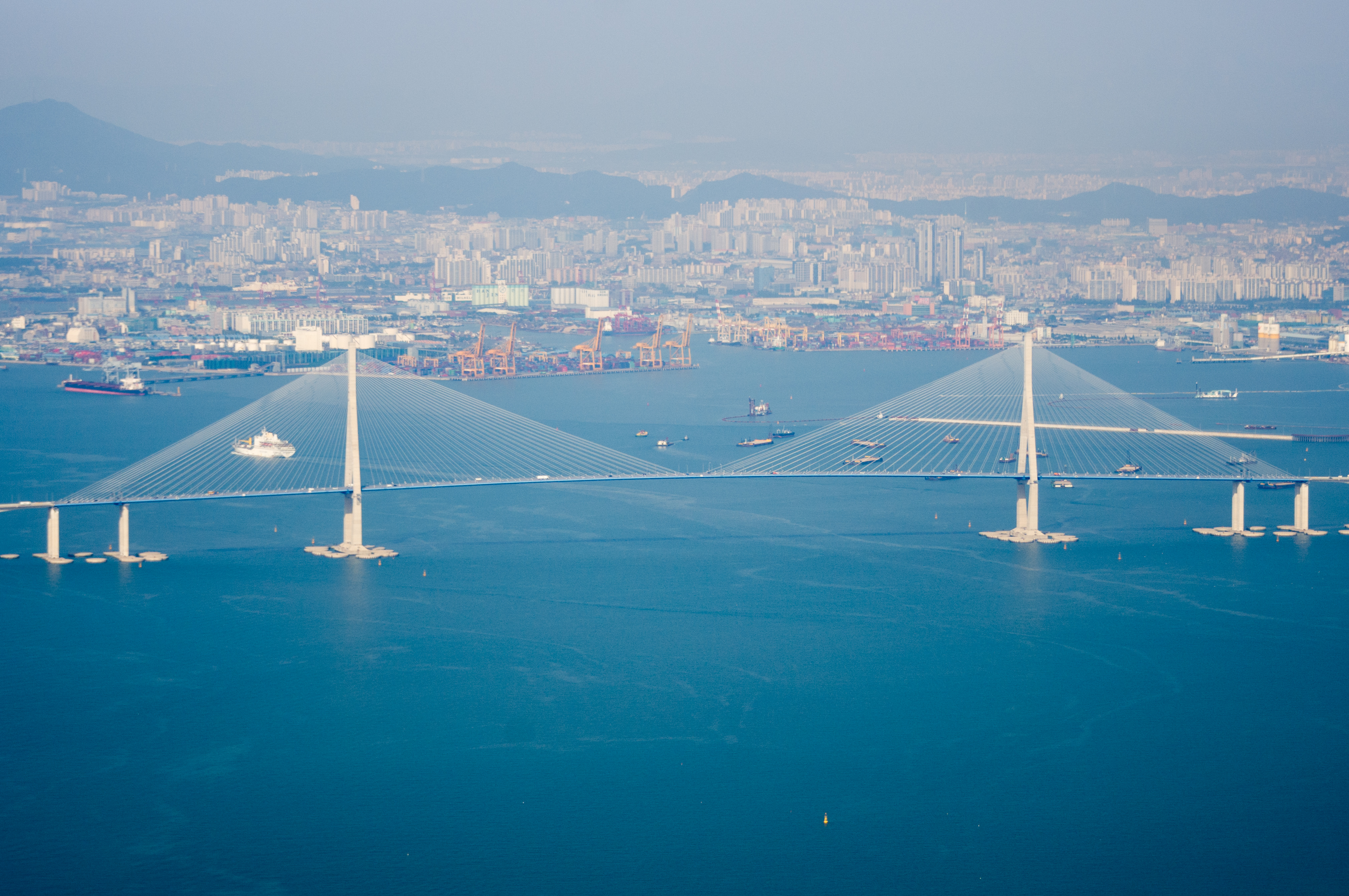
- Incheondaegyo
- Coordinates: 37°24′50″N 126°34′00″E
- Carries: 6-lane expressway
- Locale: Incheon, South Korea

Characteristics
- Design: Cable-stayed bridge, arch bridge
- Total length: 21.38 km (13.28 mi)
- Width: 33.4 m (110 ft)
- Height: 230.5 m (756 ft) (pylons)
- Longest span: 800 m (2,600 ft)
- No. of spans: 5
- Clearance below: 74 m (243 ft)

History
- Construction start: 2005
- Construction end: 2009

Location
- Interactive map of Incheon Bridge

The Incheon Bridge (Korean: 인천대교; RR: Incheon daegyo) is a reinforced concrete cable-stayed bridge in South Korea. At its opening in October 2009, it became the second bridge connection between Yeongjong Island and the mainland of Incheon. The Incheon Bridge is South Korea's longest spanning cable-stayed bridge. In comparison, it is the world's sixteenth longest cable-stayed bridge as of January 2019.

The bridge provides direct access between Songdo and Incheon International Airport, reducing travel time between them by up to one hour.

The section of the bridge crossing the sea, whose concessionaire is Incheon Bridge Corporation, is funded by the private sector. Korea Expressway Corporation and the Korean Ministry of Land, Transport and Maritime Affairs (MLTM) managed the project.

The bridge is located to the south of the Yeongjong Bridge (which was the first bridge connection between Yeongjong Island and the mainland) and the Third Incheon Bridge (project to open in 2025).

== Construction ==
The main design and build contractor was Samsung C&T Corporation JV (Daelim, Daewoo, GS, Hanjin, Hanwha, Kumho). Total costs were ₩2.45 trillion, including federally funded approach roads. The 21.38-kilometre-long (13.3 mi) highway project consisted of government-built sections at three ends and a 12.34 kilometres (7.7 mi) section in the middle built with private capital.

The bridge section is 18.38 km (11.4 mi) long. The bridge has a cable stayed section over the main sea route to Incheon port. This was the most difficult part to construct, with a main tower 230.5 m (756.2 ft) high, vertical clearance of 74 m (243 ft), and five spans: a centre span of 800 m (2,625 ft) flanked on either side by spans of 260 m (853 ft) and 80 m (262 ft). Adjacent to the center section are approach spans consisting of a series of 150 m (492 ft) balanced cantilever spans. Lower-level viaducts consisting of 50 m (164 ft) spans connect to land at each end of the bridge. An arch span is located on the Incheon side of the bridge, which consists of two red-colored identical arches on each side of the bridge deck.

== Design ==
Because the bridge is situated in a known seismically active region, a seismic design of the substructure was adopted.

At 12.3 km long, with a main cable stayed span of 800m, the new Incheon Bridge is one of the five longest of its type in the world. Its 33.4m wide steel/concrete composite deck carries six lanes of traffic 74 m above the main shipping route in and out of Incheon port and links Incheon International Airport on Yeongjong Island to the international business district of New Songdo City and the metropolitan districts of South Korea's capital, Seoul. The cable stayed section of the crossing is 1,480 m long, made up of five spans measuring 80 m, 260 m, 800 m, 260 m and 80 m respectively: height of the inverted-Y main towers is 230.5 m. A 1.8 km approach span and 8.7 km viaduct complete the crossing, both constructed with precast prestressed concrete box girder decks. Foundations are drilled piles 3 m in diameter. In order to accommodate movement between the bridge decks, the Incheondaegyo was equipped with expansion joints weighing up to 50 tons per joint.

== Notable incidents ==
On May 20, 2010, twelve passengers were killed in a bus crash at the bridge.

== In popular media ==
- Rough Cut: The bridge, under construction, was used as a backdrop for a fight sequence and appeared in promotional images for the film

== Gallery ==
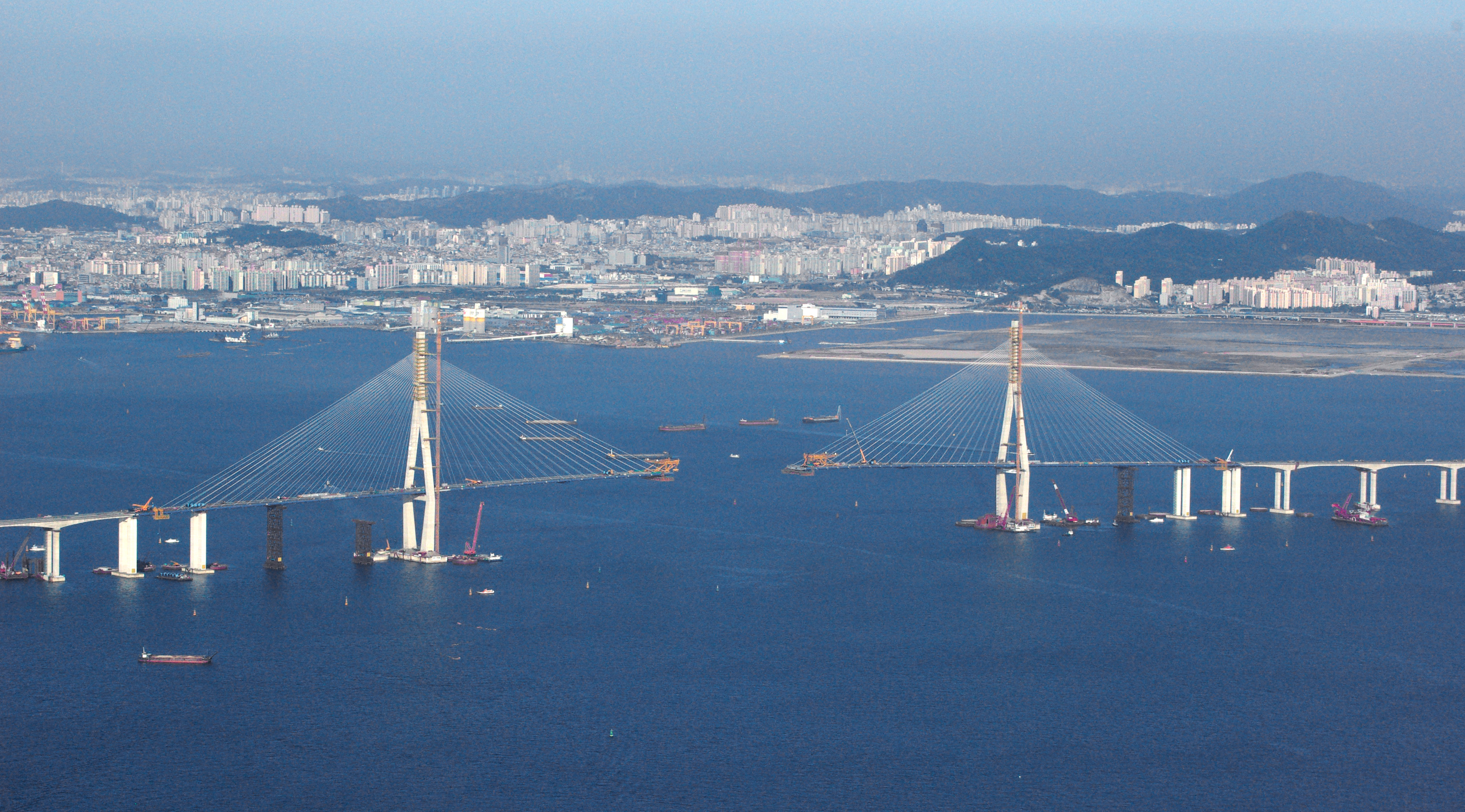
main span of Incheon Bridge under construction in October 2008

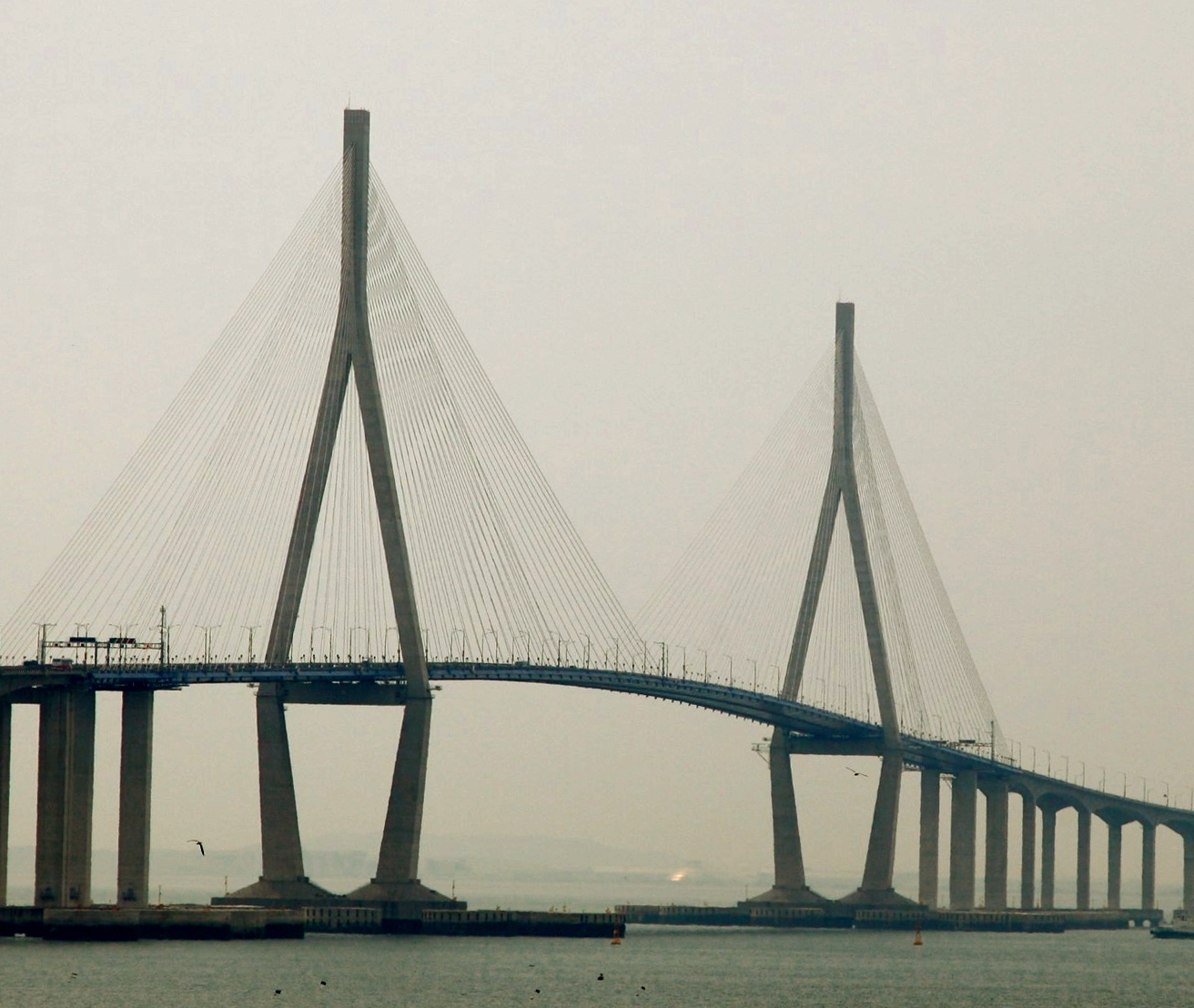
The cable stayed section

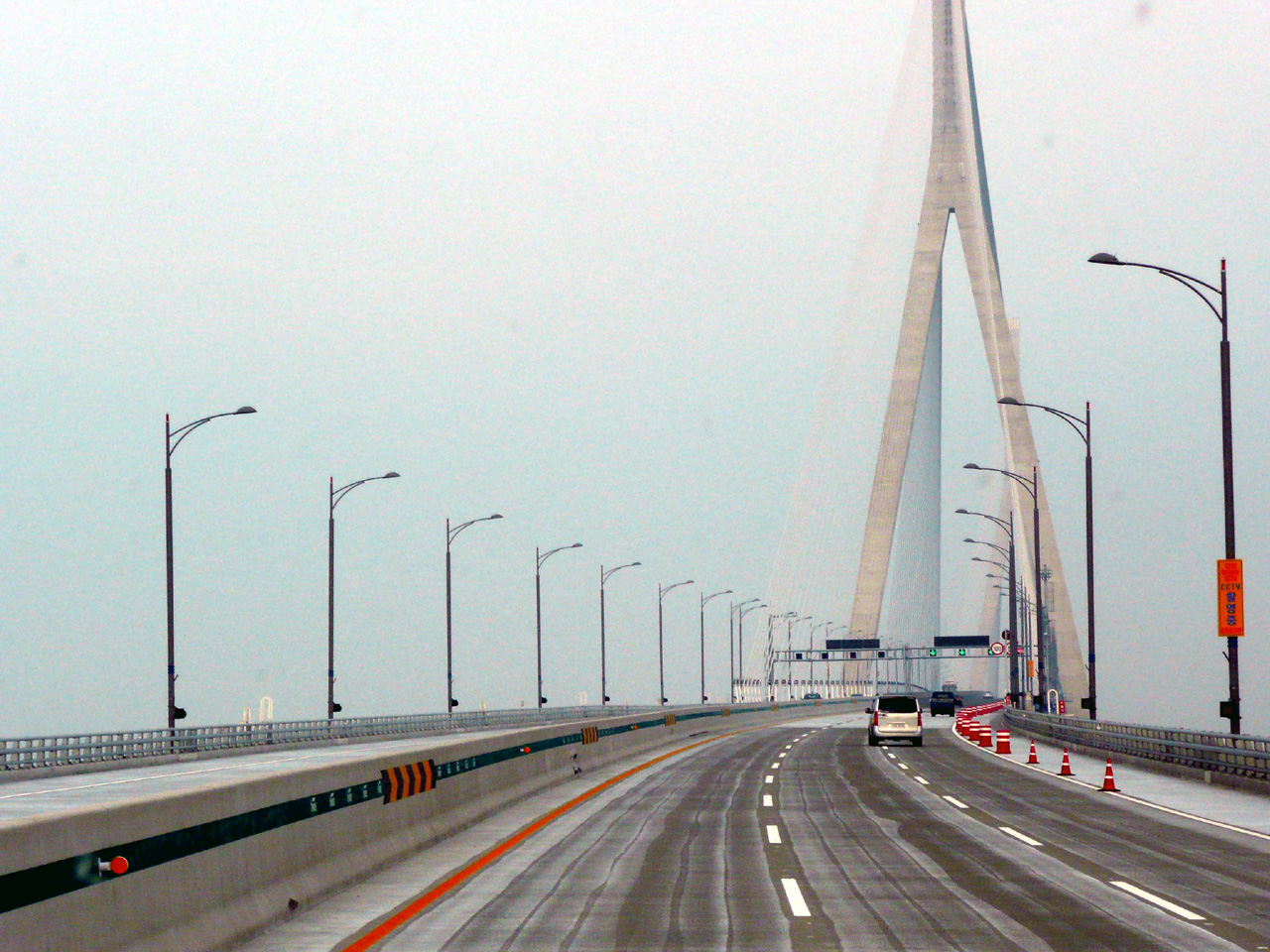
Road view approaching the cable-stayed section

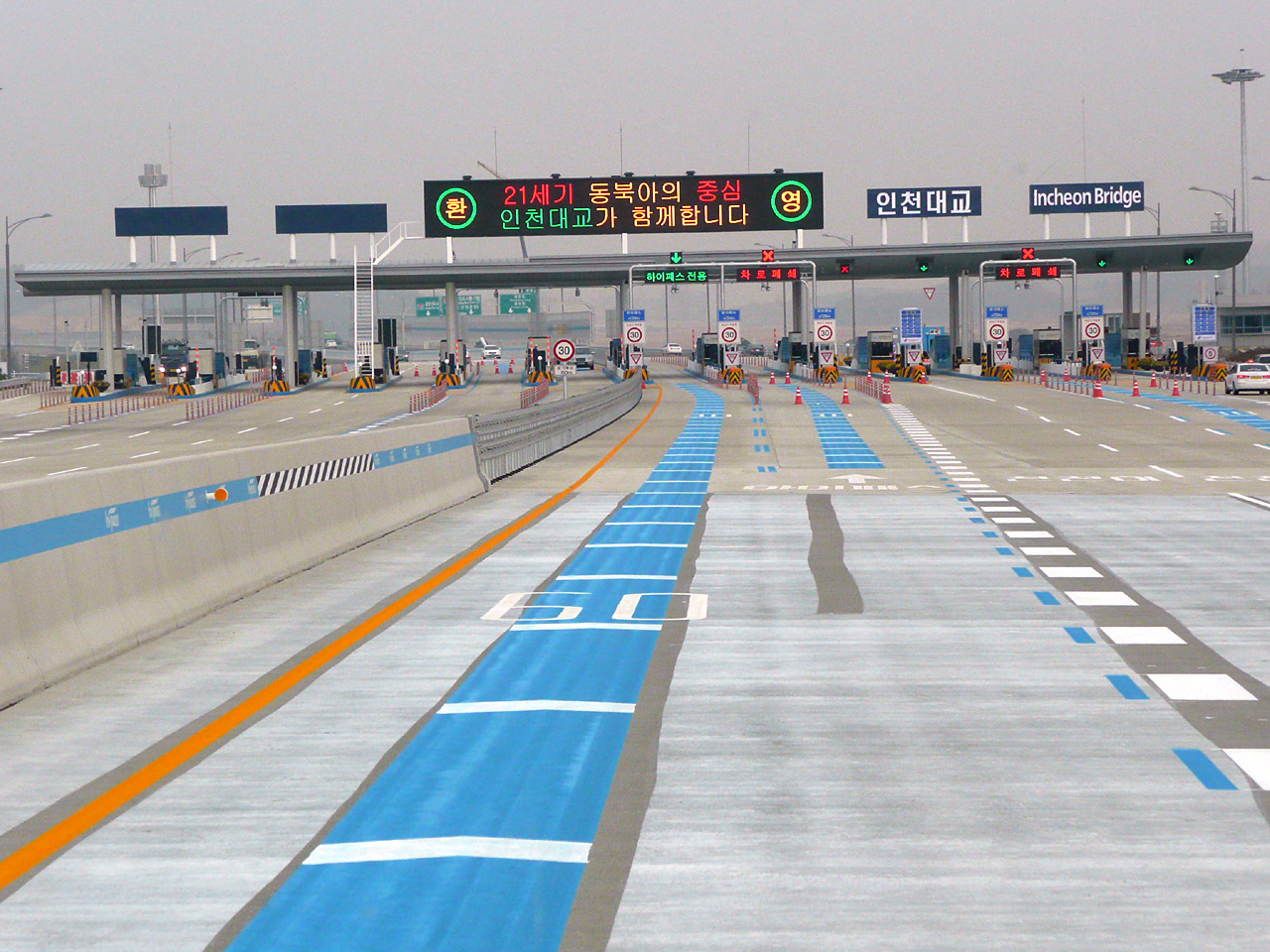
The toll gate, on Yeongjong Island

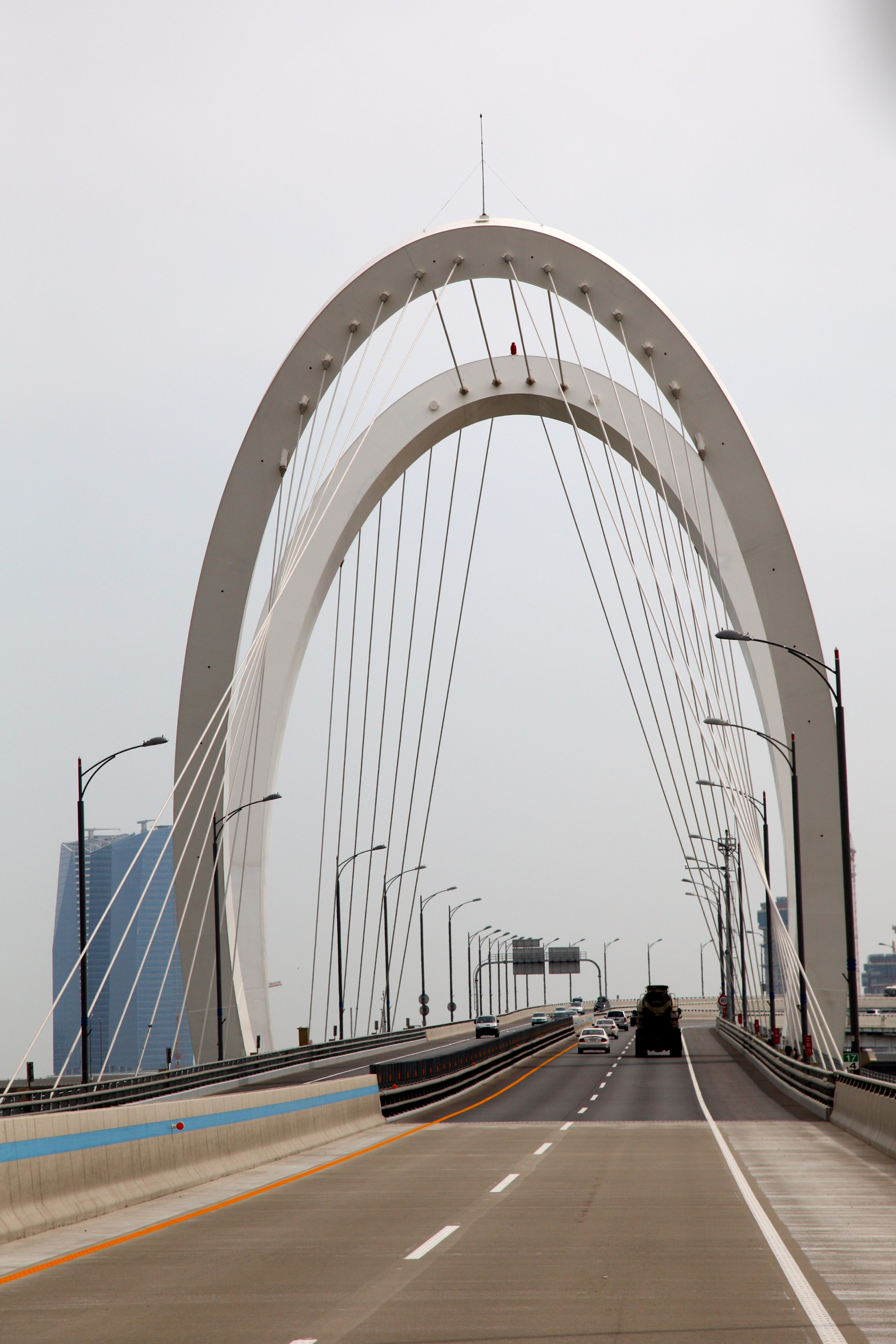
Ongnyeon Bridge
