= Horyonggoksan =

Mountain in Incheon, South Korea

Highest point
- Elevation: 246 m (807 ft)
- Coordinates: 37°23′N 126°25′E

Geography
- Location: South Korea

Korean name
- Hangul: 호룡곡산
- Hanja: 虎龍谷山
- RR: Horyonggoksan
- MR: Horyonggoksan

Horyonggoksan (Korean: 호룡곡산) is a mountain in Incheon, South Korea. The mountain is on the southern end of Muuido, in Jung District. It has an elevation of 246 m (807 ft).

== See also ==
- List of mountains in Korea
