= Silmido =

Island in Incheon, South Korea

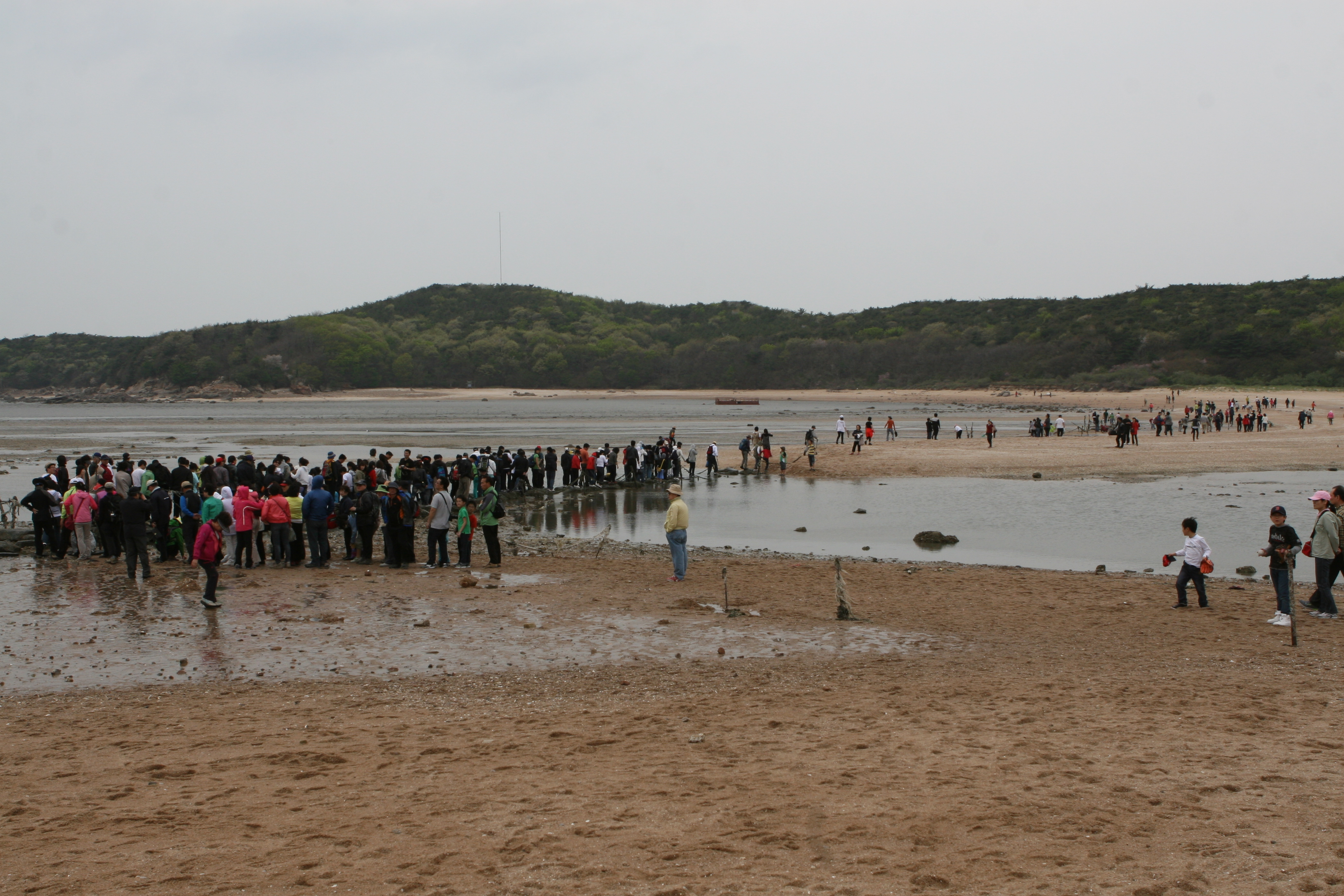
- A land crossing to the island (2010)
- Interactive map of Silmido

Geography
- Coordinates: 37°24′06″N 126°23′30″E

Korean name
- Hangul: 실미도
- Hanja: 實尾島
- RR: Silmido
- MR: Silmido

Silmido (Korean: 실미도), or Silmi Island, is an uninhabited island in Incheon, South Korea. The 0.25 km^{2} (62 acres) island is in the Yellow Sea and is closest to Muuido, which is connected to the mainland by ferry. It is about 5 kilometres (3.1 miles) southwest of Yongyu Island, where Incheon International Airport is located. Most of Silmido island consists of hills that are around 80 metres (260 ft) high.

== Unit 684 ==
On January 21, 1968, a group of 31 North Korean military soldiers were sent to South Korea by Kim Il Sung to kill President Park Chung Hee. A firefight began when the commandos were just 800 yards from the Blue House (the South Korean Presidential Palace). The attempt failed and all but two of the 31 North Koreans were either killed by the South Korean security forces or committed suicide.

In retaliation for the attack, South Korea established a secret military unit, Unit 684, to assassinate Kim Il Sung. From January 21, 1968, to August 23, 1971, Silmido served as the training ground for the unit. Under circumstances which remain unclear, the members of the group mutinied and went to Seoul in 1971, where they were killed or committed suicide.

The 2003 film Silmido is about Unit 684 and depicts the island.

== See also ==
- Islands of South Korea
- Geography of South Korea
- Tourism in South Korea
- List of islands
- Desert island
