= Muuido =

Island in South Korea

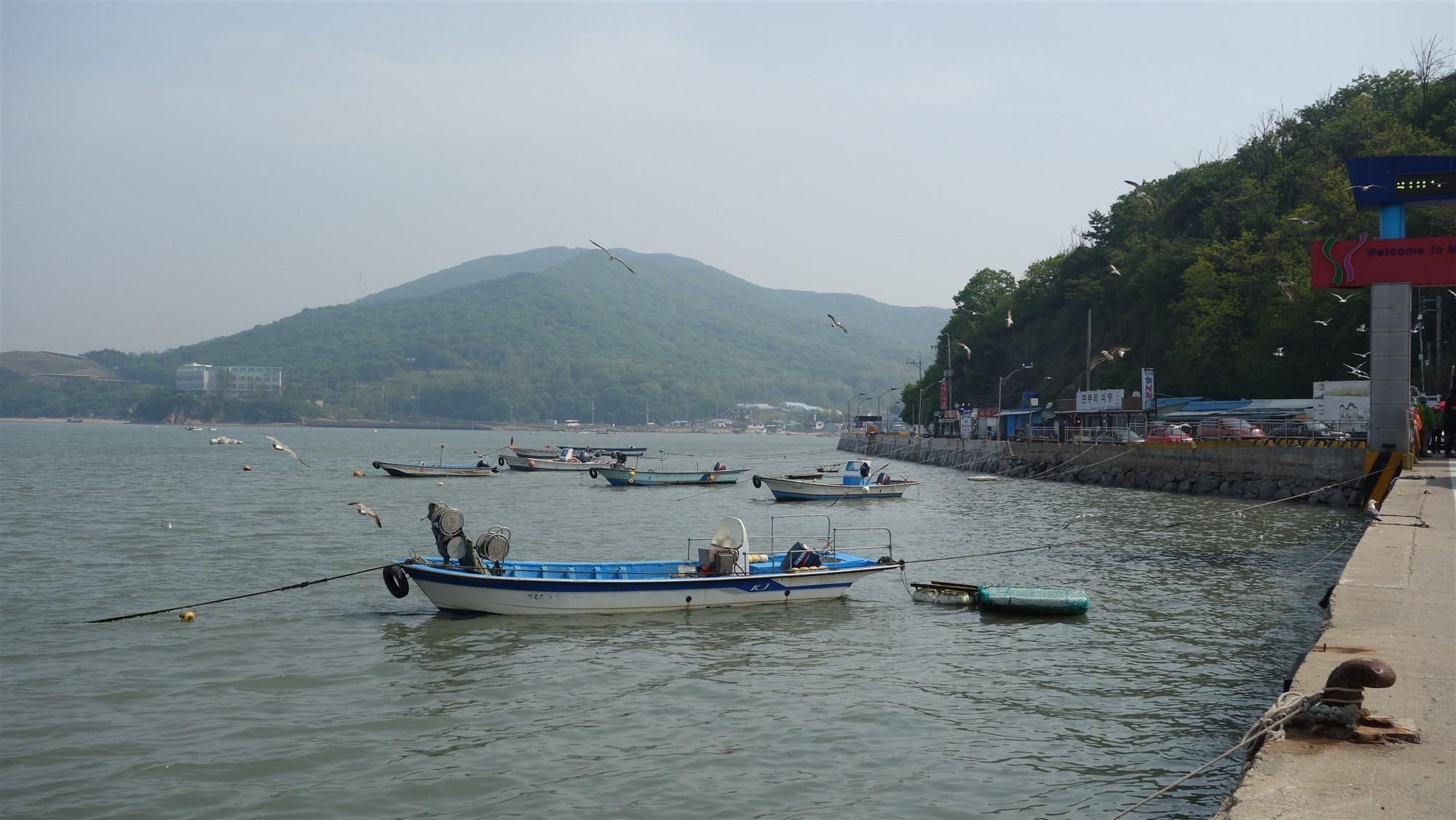
- The shore of the island (2014)
- Interactive map of Muuido

Geography
- Coordinates: 37°23′31″N 126°24′56″E

Korean name
- Hangul: 무의도
- Hanja: 舞衣島
- RR: Muuido
- MR: Muŭido

Muuido (Korean: 무의도; lit. 'dancer's dress island'), also known as Muui Island, is an island in Incheon, South Korea. It is a small island located south of Yongyu Island, which was joined with Yeongjong Island through land reclamation when Incheon International Airport was built.

== Description ==
Muuido has an area of 9.43 km^{2} (3.64 mi^{2}) and a coastline length of 31.6 km (19.6 mi). From north to south, its length is about 5 km (3.1 mi), and from east to west about 3 km (1.9 mi).

Muuido is served by a daily ferry from Incheon ferry terminal on the mainland, as well as by a frequent car ferry which crosses the narrow channel separating the island from Yongyu Island. Buses run from the airport and the Incheon Airport Maglev will also provide service to nearby Yongyu station. With the opening of Muui Bridge between Muui and Yeongjong, ferry service to the island has been reduced.

Silmido Beach is located on the northwest of the island.

=== Hanagae Beach ===
Hanagae Beach is located on the west coast of the island. It is about a kilometer long and has a vast tidal flat.

It has small cabanas on the beach for overnight lodging, and an assortment of local restaurants and hotels. There are many shellfish on the shores of the island. At Hanagae Beach, people can catch crabs, clams, snails, surf clams, and horned turbans. Hanagae has an outdoor stage and has hosted festivals, including the punk festival IT'S A FEST and Muuido Summer Sea Dance Festival.

=== Silmido ===
Silmi Island is a smaller uninhabited island located off the NW shore of Muuido. It is famously the former training site for Unit 684, as depicted in the film Silmido.

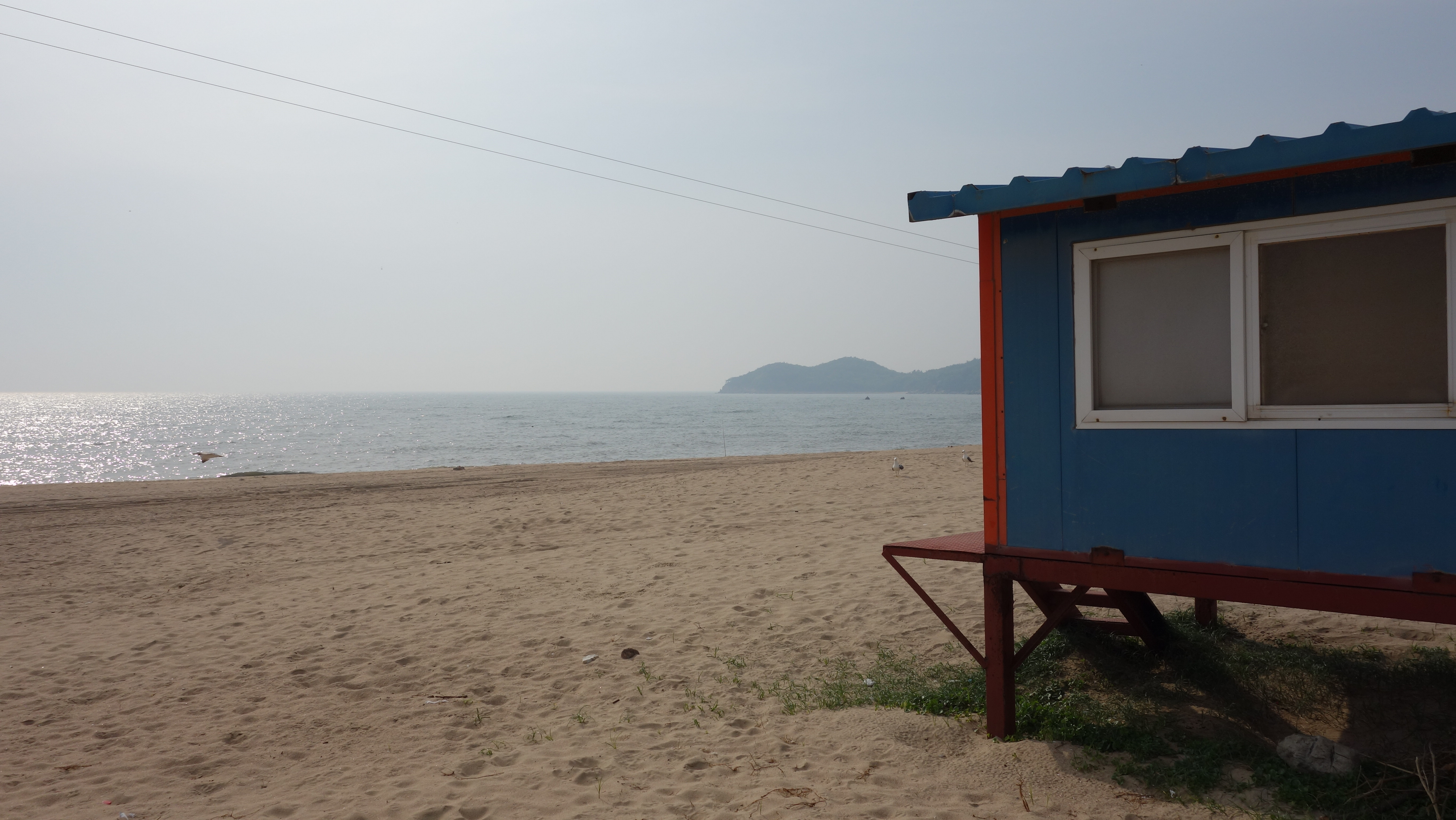
Cabana at Hanagae Beach, Muuido
