= Konohana =

Konohana may refer to:

- Konohana, the Japanese name of the Pokémon Nuzleaf
- "Konohana", the Japanese title of episode 6 of xxxHolic: Kei
- Konohana Arena, an arena in Shizuoka, Shizuoka, Japan
- Konohana Bridge, a self-anchored suspension bridge located in Osaka, Japan
- Konohana-ku, one of the 24 wards of Osaka City, Japan
