= Sanchaji Bridge =

Sanchaji Bridge 三汊矶大桥
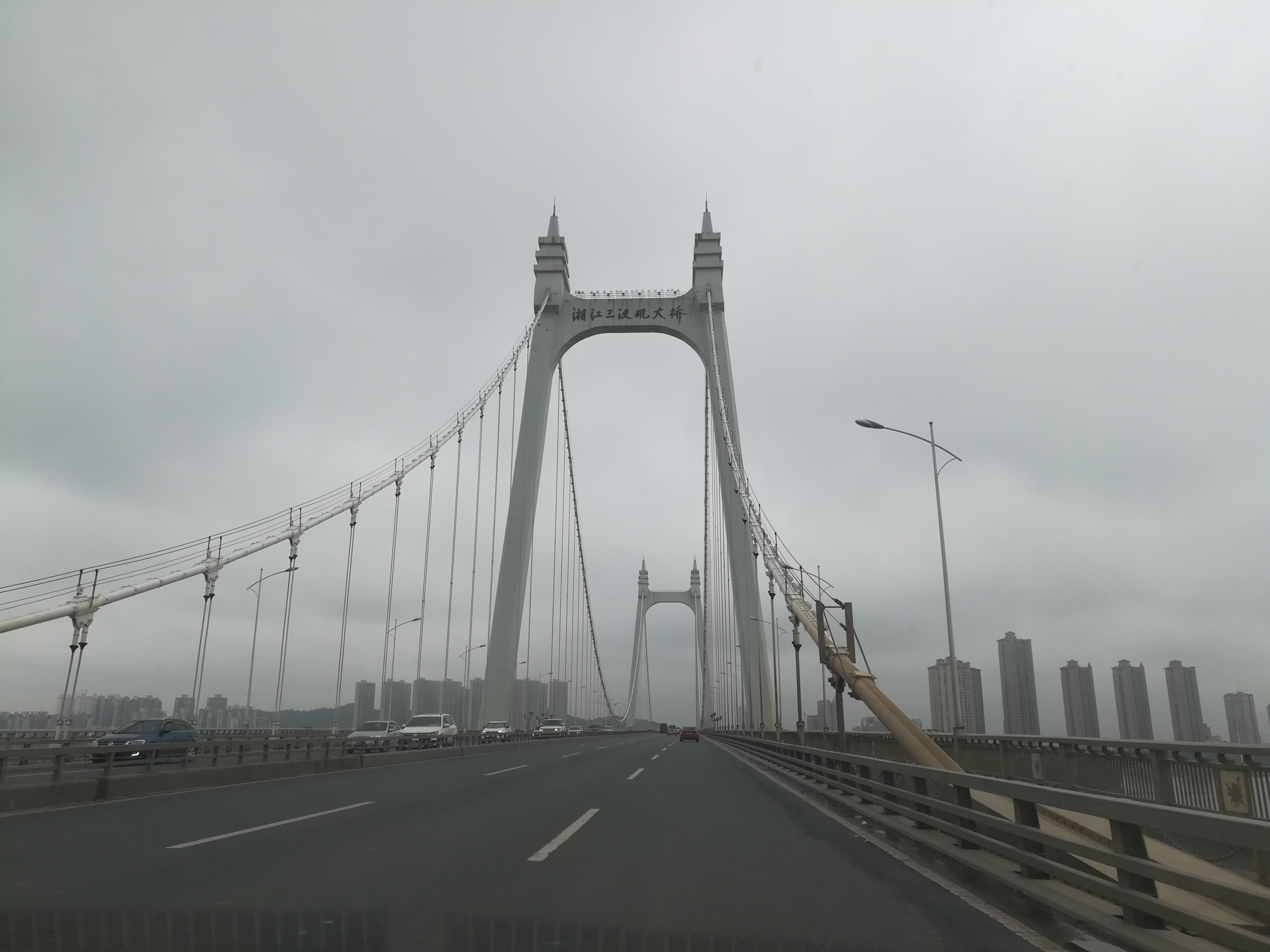
- The Sanchaji Bridge.
- Coordinates: 28°16′43″N 112°57′44″E
- Carries: Motor vehicles, pedestrians and bicycles
- Crosses: Xiang River
- Locale: Yuelu District/Kaifu District, Changsha, Hunan, China
- Named for: Sanchaji
- Maintained by: Department of Transportation, Changsha Government
- Preceded by: Xiang River
- Followed by: Xiang River

Characteristics
- Design: Self-anchored suspension bridge
- Material: Concrete, steel
- Total length: 1,577 metres (5,174 ft)
- Width: 132 metres (433 ft)
- Height: 124 metres (407 ft)
- Traversable?: Yes
- Longest span: 732 metres (2,402 ft)
- Piers in water: 21
- No. of lanes: 6

History
- Designer: Central South University and Changsha Planning Institute
- Contracted lead designer: Huang Yuanqun (黄元群)
- Constructed by: 5th Branch, Bureau of Bridge, China Railway Group
- Construction start: April 30, 2004
- Construction end: June 8, 2006
- Opened: June 8, 2006
- Inaugurated: June 8, 2006

Location
- Interactive map of Sanchaji Bridge

The Sanchaji Bridge (simplified Chinese: 三汊矶大桥; traditional Chinese: 三汊磯大橋; pinyin: Sānchàjī Dàqiáo) is a self-anchored suspension bridge in Changsha, Hunan, China. Completed on June 8, 2006, it has a main span of 732-metre (2,402 ft) and total length of 1,577-metre (5,174 ft). It is signed as part of the North Second Ring Road. The bridge crosses the Xiang River between Yuelu District and Kaifu District.

== Name ==
The name of the bridge comes from the historic place "Sanchaji", which is a community in Yuelu District now.

== Design ==
The bridge over the Xiang River had the longest self-anchored suspension bridge in the world when it was completed in June 2006–1,577 metres (5,174 ft). This was a record during that time.

== History ==
Before 2004, crossing the Xiang River was a time-consuming ordeal. The only way to cross the river was via ferry, and due to the ever growing number of cars, the Changsha government knew that a bridge was needed to support transportation.

The Sanchaji Bridge designed by Central South University and Changsha Planning Institute. The bridge was bid in 2004 to the 5th Branch of Bureau of Bridge, China Railway Group. The foundation stone laying ceremony was held on April 30, 2004. Construction began in April 2004 and was completed in June 2006. The contracted designer was Huang Yuanqun (黄元群).
