= Hutsonville Bridge =

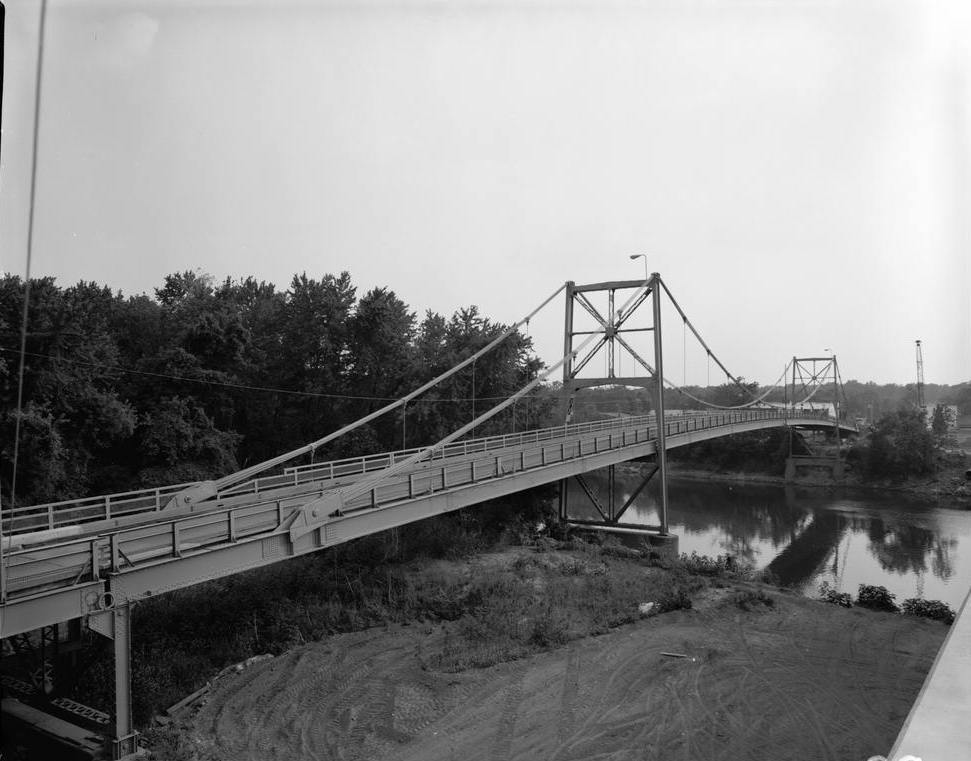
- Looking southwest from the Indiana side
- Coordinates: 39°06′36″N 87°39′18″W
- Carries: Former Illinois Route 135/Indiana State Road 154
- Crosses: Wabash River
- Locale: Hutsonville, Crawford County, Illinois/Graysville, Sullivan County, Indiana
- Maintained by: Indiana Department of Transportation (former)

Characteristics
- Design: Self-anchored suspension bridge
- Total length: 1,002 feet (305 m)
- Width: 2 lanes, 20 feet (6.1 m)
- Height: 70.2 feet (21.4 m)
- Longest span: 350 feet (110 m)

History
- Opened: November 18, 1939
- Closed: 1988

Statistics
- Daily traffic: vehicular, unknown

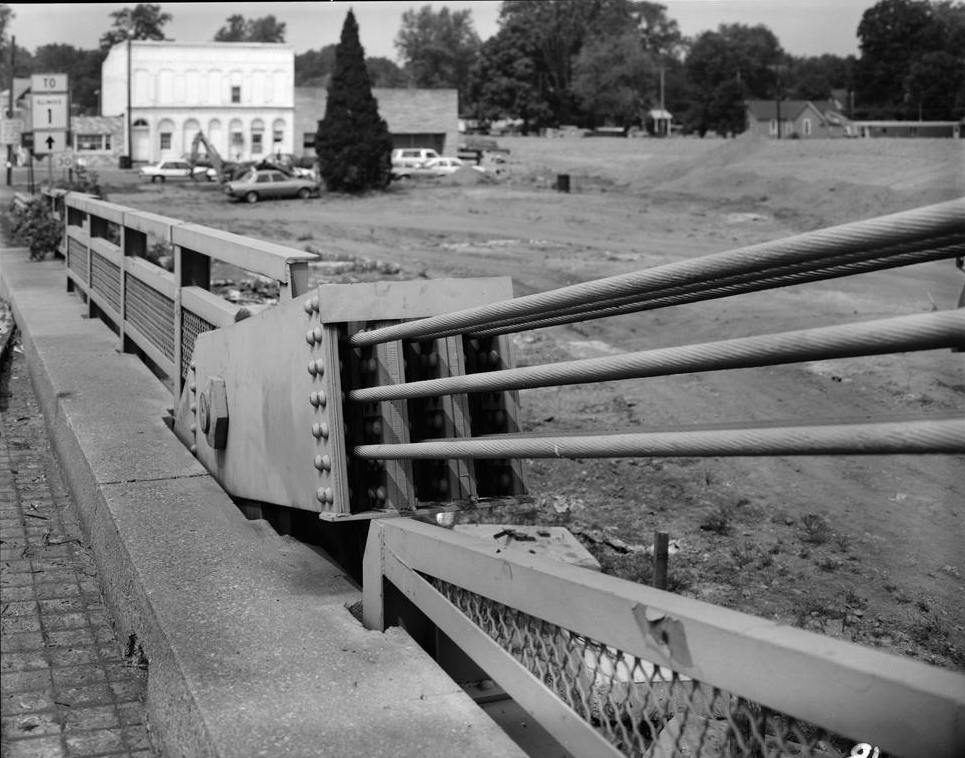
Self-anchorage detail, bridge deck view

The Hutsonville Bridge or Sullivan-Hutsonville Bridge connecting Crawford County, Illinois, and Sullivan County, Indiana, United States, over the Wabash River, built 1939 and replaced in 1988, was an example of the relatively rare self-anchored suspension bridge type. It was designed by Robinson & Steinman, with R. V. Milbank as the resident chief engineer, and constructed by Wisconsin Bridge and Iron Company as general contractor and Vincennes Steel Corporation as steel fabricators and Charles J. Glasgow as a subcontractor.

Note the use of multiple independent cables, rather than a large single interleaved and sheathed cable, as is typical for larger suspension bridges, or eyebars, often used in smaller bridges such as the Pittsburgh Seventh Street Bridge, also self-anchored.

Although the bridge was determined eligible for inclusion in the National Register of Historic Places in 1987 due to the rarity of its type, the bridge was replaced in 1988 and demolished, with the replacement bridge being made of concrete and supported by pillars instead of suspension.

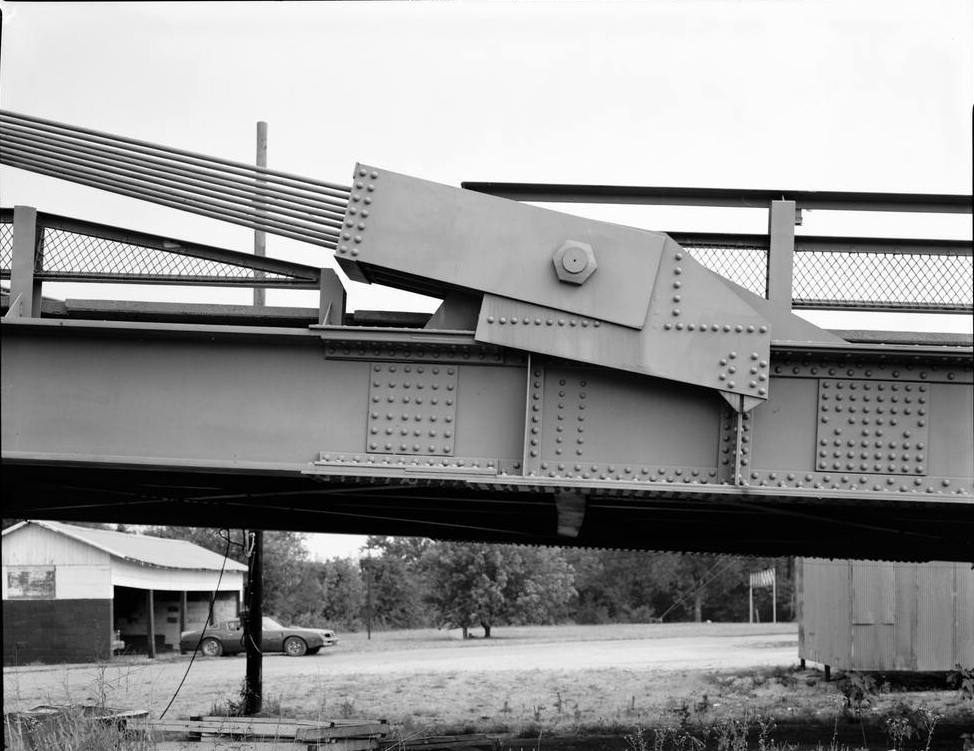
Self-anchorage detail, outside view

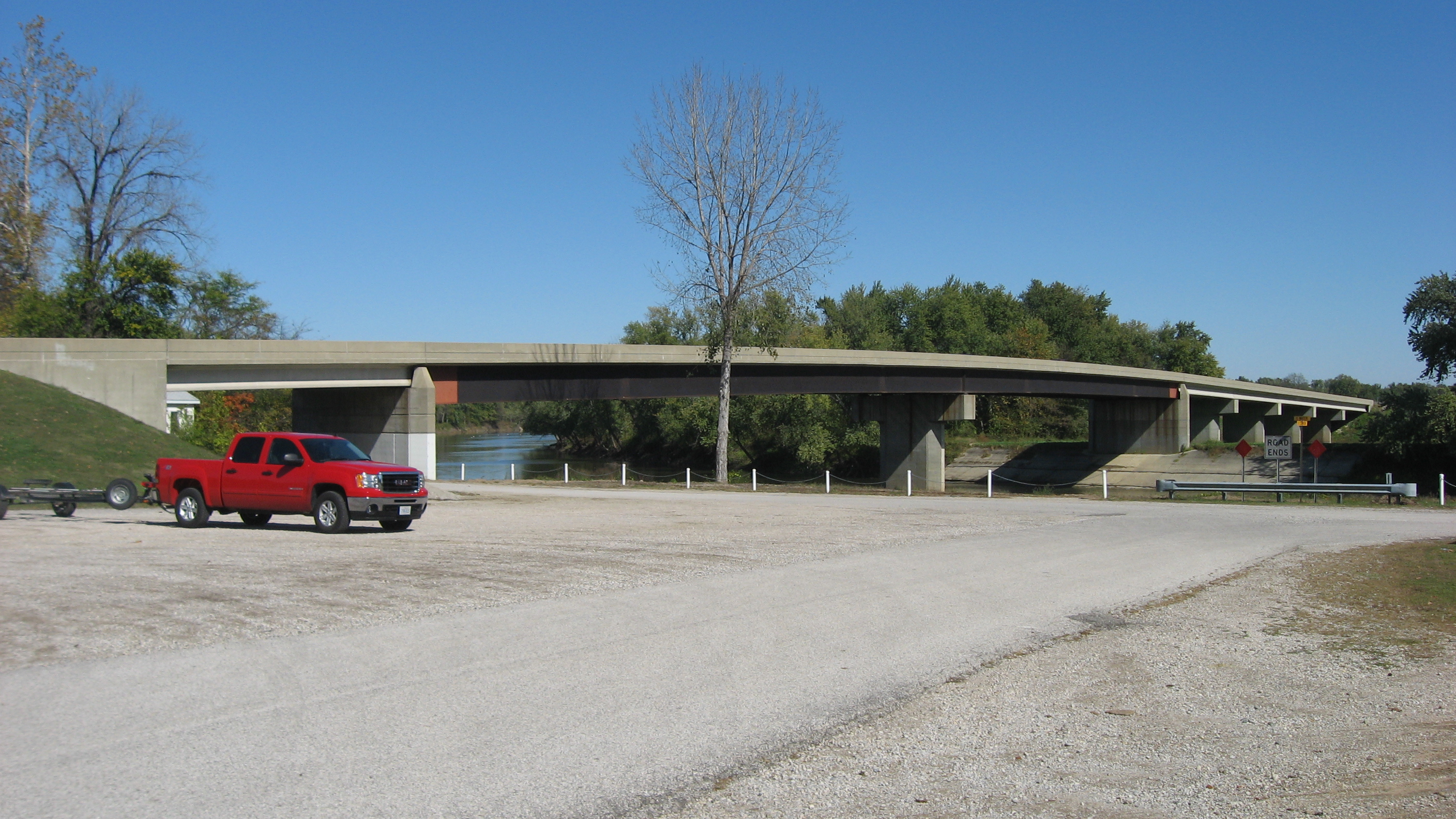
The replacement bridge, looking from Hutsonville toward Indiana

According to the Bridgemeister.com site referenced below, the demolition was controversial. The site in turn cites the September 26, 1988, issue of the Springfield, Illinois, State Journal-Register that the company to which the $100,000 demolition contract was let offered to turn the money over to save the bridge. The locals agreed, but the company's Chief Engineer Stephen Schneider was quoted, "I think Indiana really wants to tear it down. They've been ... forced to send inspectors out every two weeks. I think they just want the headache gone." Gary Abell, spokesman for the Indiana Dept. Of Highways said its design is "not one of the best. It works in theory, but not in practice. This is like trying to save a mistake." In 2002, an unnamed INDOT representative was cited as saying, "I am not sure why you are interested in that bridge, but from our standpoint, it was a very poorly designed bridge that had many problems from the day that it was completed, until it was brought down."

== See also ==
- List of bridges documented by the Historic American Engineering Record in Illinois
- List of bridges documented by the Historic American Engineering Record in Indiana
