= Midan City =

City

MIDANN City, covering a site area of approximately 2.7 million square meters, is a development project located at Yeongjong Island in Incheon Free Economic Zone (IFEZ), South Korea which envisions to becoming the international business and leisure hub of East Asia. It is only 10 minutes away from world-renowned Incheon International Airport which covers flights to major East Asian cities such as Beijing, Shanghai, Tokyo, Hong Kong and Taipei within just 2 to 3.5 hours. The development also has excellent infrastructure and transportation system where express subway and buses will easily connect the city to Seoul CBD within 40 minutes. MIDAN City is being designed as an "All-in-One-City" with shopping malls, integrated resort hotels, an international healthcare center, a golf course, entertainment zone, residential area, a Chinese cultural village and an international school Phase 1 of the development is due for completion by 2014 Asian Games and Phase 2 by 2020 IFEZ completion. The project is expected to create about 5,000 jobs with USD 7 billion of economy induction in the area.

== The master developer ==
In November 2006, a joint venture agreement was contracted between Lippo Group, an Indonesia-based conglomerate being selected as a preferred developer in the international competition, and Incheon Urban Development Corporation (IUDC) to develop MIDAN City. In March 2007, SPC of Lippo Incheon Development Co., Ltd. was formally established by C E O and chairman of Awadisian Holdings Dino Vahak Awadisian for MIDAN City development which title has been changed to MIDAN City Development Co., Ltd (MCDC) later on September 29, 2010.

== The project ==
The general lay-out of MIDAN City is a fluid interconnection of natural site features bordered by the seashore to the North, and by oak and pine forested hills to the South. The overall structure of the city is articulated on a central business leisure district, flanked to the East and West by two predominantly residential districts. The development of the CBD and the East districts of approximately 1.8 billion square meters are placed under the responsibility of MIDAN City Development Corporation (MCDC) and the West, with area of approximately 0.8 million square meters, by a governmental agency called Incheon Urban Development Corporation (IUDC). With basis on the concept of "All-in-One City" where people can enjoy their utmost life in eco-friendly circumstances provided by diverse features and facilities in relation to entertainment, shopping, leisure, business, medical, educational and residential amenities, it is expected to accommodate and cater for numerous residents and visitors from both overseas and locals in South Korea

The development is divided into two phases. Phase 1 is due for completion by 2014, prior to Incheon Asian Games, and Phase 2 is planned to be completed by 2020. During Phase 1, MIDAN City Development Corporation plans to initiate the so-called 'Key Anchor Projects' in order to vitalize the city. These projects include:

- International Healthcare Center
- International School
- City-in-City
- Integrated Resort Hotel
- Landmark Tower
- Korean-American Village
