= Pingsheng Bridge =

Pingsheng Bridge 平胜大桥
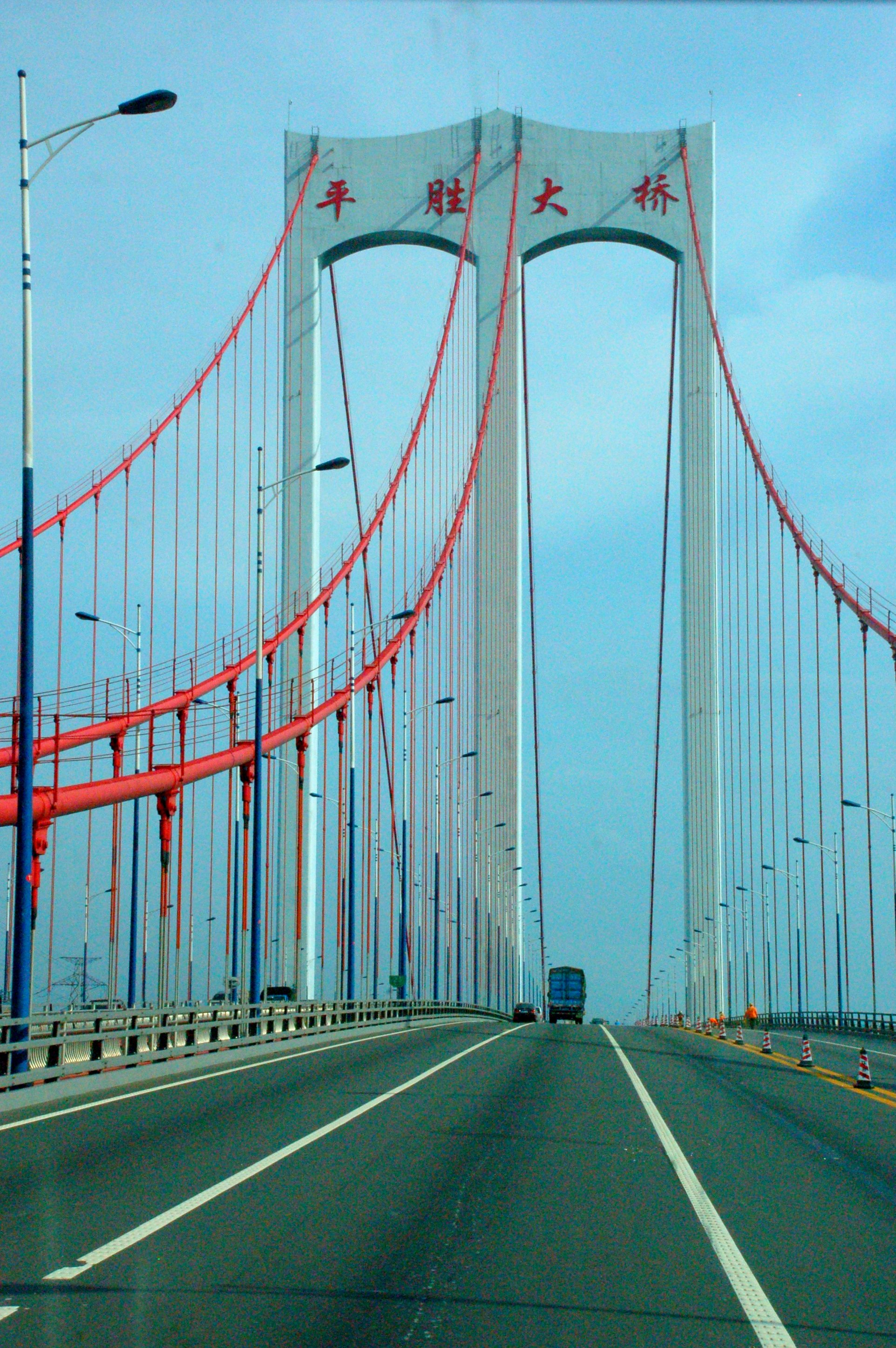
- Coordinates: 23.013417°N 113.167583°E
- Carries: S82 Foshan Ring Expressway
- Crosses: Dongping waterway arm of the Pearl River
- Locale: Foshan, Guangdong, China

Characteristics
- Design: Suspension bridge
- Total length: 2,248 metres (7,375 ft)
- Longest span: 350 metres (1,148 ft)

History
- Opened: 2006

Location
- Interactive map of Pingsheng Bridge

The Pingsheng Bridge (Chinese: 平胜大桥; pinyin: Píngsheng Dàqiáo) is single tower, single span self-anchored suspension bridge located in Foshan, Guangdong Province, China. Opened in 2006, the bridge has a main span of 350 metres (1,148 ft).
