= Jonathan Kim =

South Korean film producer (born 1960)

Jonathan Hyung-joon Kim
- Born: 1960 (age 65–66)
- Occupation: Film producer

Korean name
- Hangul: 김형준
- RR: Gim Hyeongjun
- MR: Kim Hyŏngjun

Jonathan Hyung-joon Kim (Korean: 김형준; born 1960) is a South Korean film producer. He has produced five of the country's top 50 highest-grossing films of all time, including Silmido, the first film to surpass 10 million domestic ticket sales. He has received the Daejong Award for Best Picture and Best Executive Producer.

His 16 produced films include the critically acclaimed Lies, Ditto, To Catch a Virgin Ghost (South Korea's most profitable film of 2004), and the 2007 joint South Korean–Japanese production Virgin Snow.

He recently completed his term as the chairman of the Korean Film Producers Association. He also served as a mentor for the first two years of the Korean Film Council Filmmaker Development Lab.
