= Konohana Bridge =

Konohana Bridge 此花大橋
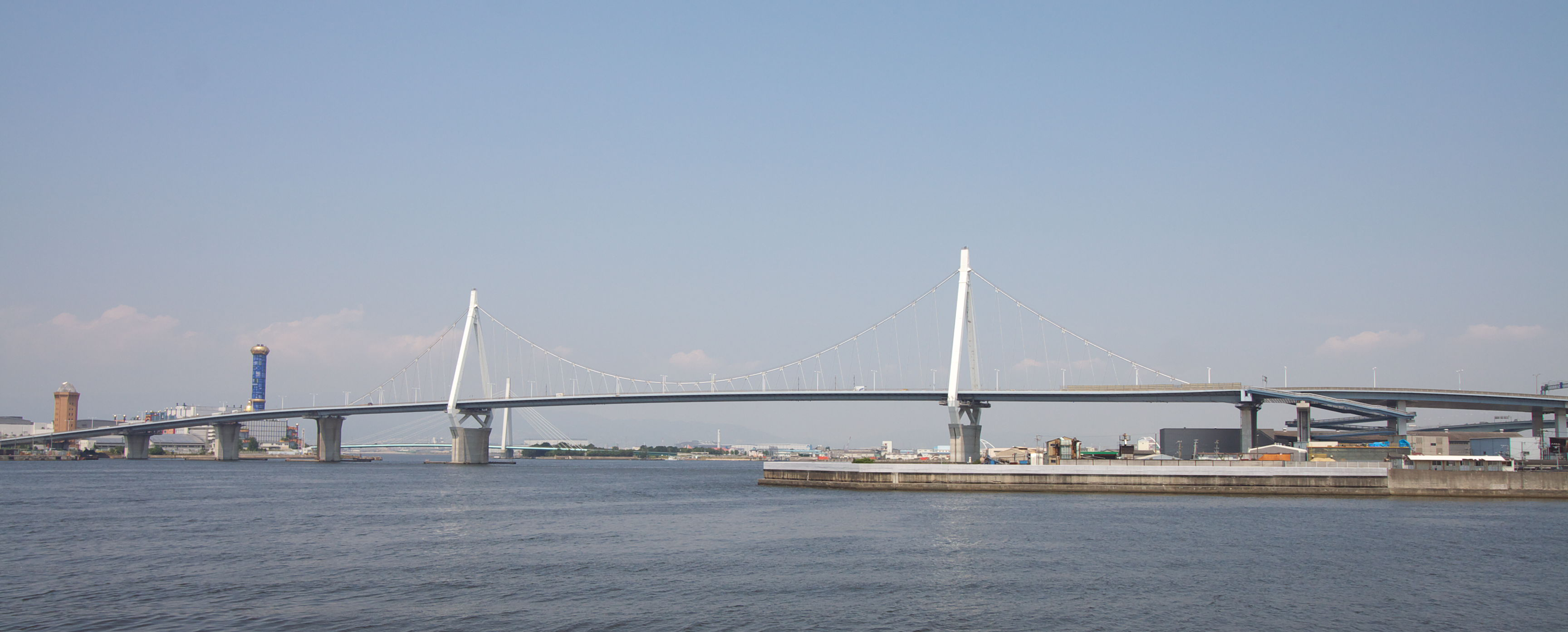
- Konohana Bridge
- Coordinates: 34°39′59.4″N 135°24′52.7″E
- Carries: Motor vehicles, pedestrians and bicycles
- Crosses: Port of Osaka
- Locale: Konohana-ku, Osaka, Japan
- Owner: Osaka City

Characteristics
- Total length: 1,570.6 m (5,153 ft)
- Width: 24.5 m (80 ft)
- Height: 98.6 m (323 ft)
- Longest span: 300 m (984 ft)

History
- Constructed by: Hitachi Zosen, MHI, Yokogawa Bridge, KHI
- Construction start: 1979
- Construction end: March 1990

The Konohana Bridge (此花大橋, Konohana Ō-hashi) is a self-anchored suspension bridge located in Osaka, Japan. Opened for traffic in 1990, it has a main span of 300 metres (980 ft). The bridge's unusual design has only a single main cable. At the time of its completion it was the largest self-anchored suspension bridge in the world. Its centre span has been tied by the Yeongjong Grand Bridge in Korea which has slightly larger side spans. As of late 2012, the single tower eastern span replacement of the San Francisco – Oakland Bay Bridge has a longer span of 385 metres (1,263 ft).
