= Unit 684 =

South Korean black ops unit (1968–1971)

209th Detachment, 2325th Group
- Active: 1 April 1968 – 23 August 1971
- Country: South Korea
- Branch: Republic of Korea Air Force
- Type: Special forces
- Role: Black operations; Bomb disposal; Close-quarters battle; Direct action; HUMINT; Irregular warfare; Long-range penetration; Manhunt; Special operations; Special reconnaissance; Tracking
- Size: 31
- Part of: 20th Special Service Squadron
- Garrison/HQ: Silmido
- Nicknames: Unit 684 (Korean: 684부대), Silmido Unit

209th Detachment, 2325th Group (Korean: 2325부대 209파견대), commonly known as Unit 684 (684부대), was a special forces unit of the Republic of Korea Air Force (ROKAF) that specialized in black ops, direct action, irregular warfare, long-range penetration, and special operations that are extremely high-risk and dangerous. It was formed to assassinate North Korean leader Kim Il Sung in 1968, in retaliation for the North's botched Blue House raid.

The unit consisted of 31 civilian recruits, mostly petty criminals and unemployed youths, and underwent three years of harsh training on the island of Silmido. The assassination mission was cancelled in 1971 and the unit mutinied, resulting in a firefight in Seoul in which most of the members of the unit were killed. The four survivors were sentenced to death by a military tribunal and executed.

== Formation ==
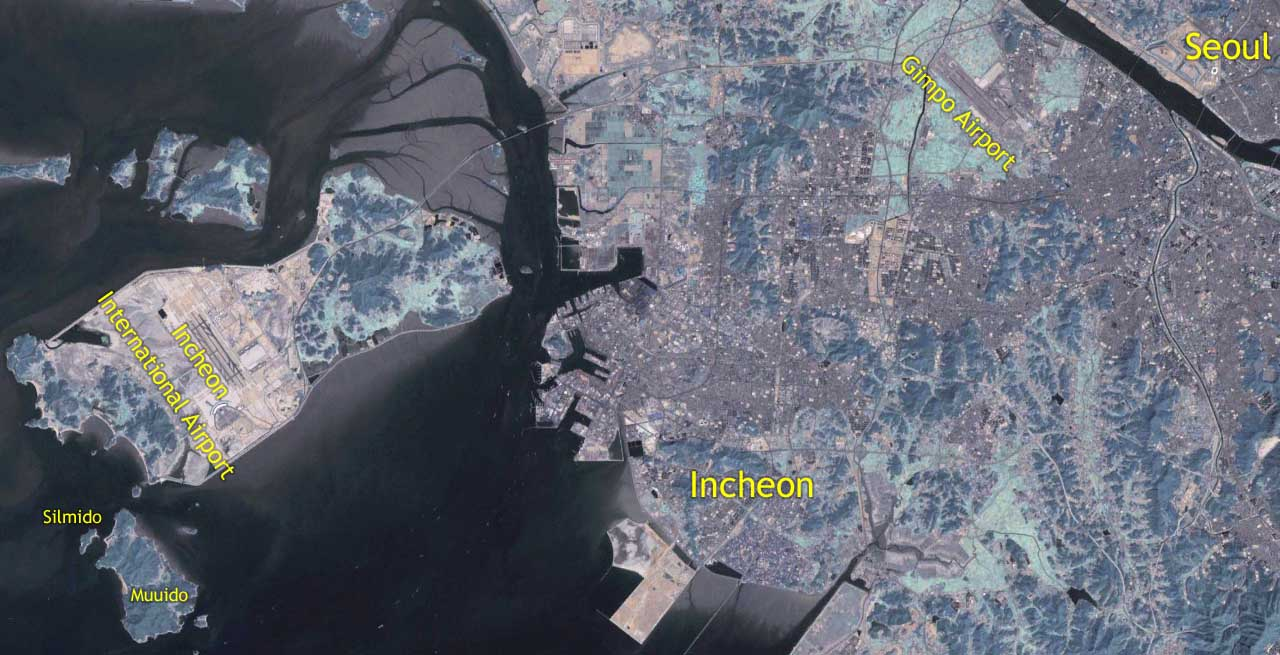
Satellite map from 2005 that shows the island of Silmido, located on the west coast of South Korea near Incheon

The 209th Detachment, 2325th Group was founded on 1 April 1968 by the Korean Central Intelligence Agency (KCIA), the main intelligence agency of South Korea, on the orders of President Park Chung Hee. According to the Ministry of National Defence the unit, nicknamed Unit 684 after its founding date, was officially a detachment of the ROKAF’s 2325th Group, which recruited 31 civilians, either petty criminals or unemployed youths who were promised money and jobs if they succeeded in their mission.

Unit 684 was formed to retaliate for the Blue House raid, a failed attempt by North Korea's Unit 124 to assassinate Park Chung Hee, which had occurred two months earlier in late January. Unit 124 was a special forces unit of the Korean People's Army Special Operations Forces (KPASOF) created specifically to assassinate Park Chung Hee in an operation to enter secretly across the Demilitarized Zone and kill him at his presidential residence, the Blue House, in Seoul to trigger political turmoil. However, Unit 124 were detected by the police only 100 metres from the Blue House wearing Republic of Korea Army (ROKA) uniforms, and 29 of 31 commandos were killed or had committed suicide within a week. Park Chung Hee decided to mirror Unit 124's mission by forming a special mission unit of 31 men to assassinate Kim Il Sung, the leader of North Korea.

Unit 684's members were trained on Silmido, a small uninhabited island off the coast of Incheon in the Yellow Sea. Members of Unit 684 endured three years of exceptionally harsh training. In fact, seven of the 31 members of Unit 684 died during training: two were executed for desertion, one was executed for threatening a trainer, one from fatigue during a sea survival exercise, and three others were executed or died after escaping the island and raping a local woman.

== Mutiny ==
Unit 684 mutiny
- Part of the Cold War
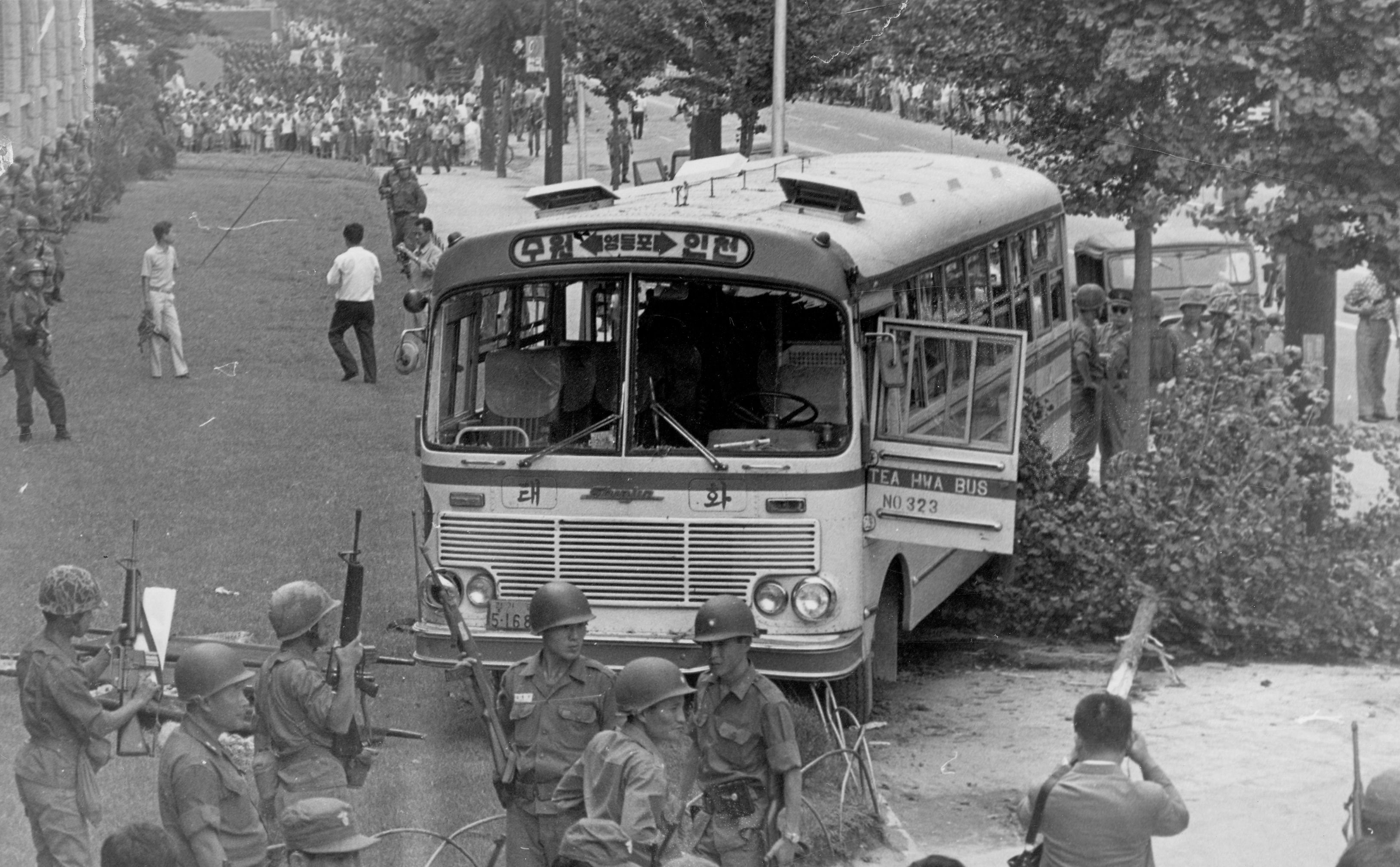
- Scene of the final confrontation
Date	23 August 1971
Location	Silmido and Seoul, South Korea
Status	Mutineers killed, committed suicide, or executed

Belligerents
South Korea	Unit 684

Commanders and leaders
Park Chung Hee	Unknown

Strength
24 guards on Silmido, at least a few dozen soldiers at checkpoint	24

Casualties and losses
18 guards killed, unknown casualties outside of Silmido	20 killed 4 captured (later executed)

Unit 684's assassination mission was cancelled in August 1971 following an improvement in relations between the two Koreas.

On 23 August 1971, the 24 surviving members of Unit 684 mutinied, killed all but six of their guards, and made their way to the mainland, where they hijacked a bus to Seoul. The bus was stopped by the army in the Daebang-dong neighborhood of Dongjak District, Seoul. Twenty members of the unit were shot or committed suicide with hand grenades.

A contemporary news report in The New York Times stated that 23 members of the unit, described by the Defense Minister Chung Rae-hyuk as "special criminals," had killed 12 Air Force guards on Silmido, escaped the island dressed as paratroopers, landed on a beach near Incheon around 1pm and then hijacked a bus. Hundreds of soldiers and police were mobilized to intercept the bus forcing it to crash into a tree in southwestern Seoul. After a standoff the unit members detonated hand grenades on the bus killing 15 and leaving four wounded. The "invasion" of Seoul had resulted in 34 killed, 30 wounded and seven missing. The Defense Minister declined to explain why non-military personnel had been kept in military custody.

Six guards survived the Silmido uprising. One of the guards, Yang Dong-su, confirmed that the unit's mission had been to infiltrate North Korea and kill Kim Il Sung. Yang stated that most of the unit's members were petty criminals, stating that "They were the kind who would get into street fights a lot." Yang also gave his version of why the uprising occurred: "They revolted because they felt that they were never going to get the chance to go to North Korea and that they would never be allowed to leave the island. They were in despair."

== Aftermath ==
The four survivors of Unit 684 were sentenced to death by a military tribunal and executed on 10 March 1972. The South Korean government concealed all information regarding Unit 684 until the 1990s.

Unit 684 came to public attention with the release of the film Silmido in 2003, but the government only released an official report on the unit and the mutiny in 2006.

In 2009, the families of 21 members of Unit 684 sued the South Korean government for ₩670 million in compensation. On 19 May 2010, the Seoul Central District Court ordered that the government pay ₩273 million in compensation to the families. The court found that "the Silmido agents were not informed of the level of danger involved with their training, and the harshness of the training violated their basic human rights" and also acknowledged the emotional pain the government caused by not officially disclosing the deaths of the agents to family members until 2006.

On August 23, 2017, the Republic of Korea Air Force (ROKAF) held a solemn joint funeral service for all members of Unit 684 who had been executed and secretly buried following the 1971 mutiny. Taking place 45 years after the execution, this ceremony marked a significant official gesture of reconciliation and restitution, as ROKAF honor guards were tasked with formally escorting the urns containing the remains and a large framed group portrait of the unit during the procession. The service was attended by grieving family members, representing the military's first formal acknowledgment of the operatives' status and the provision of proper funeral rites after decades of concealment.

On September 9, 2023, the Seoul High Court (Criminal Division 8) accepted a petition to restore the right to appeal for Im Seong-bin, one of the four Unit 684 members executed in 1972. The petition was filed by his younger sister. Following the 1971 mutiny, Im Seong-bin and three other survivors were sentenced to death by a military court. They were executed on March 10, 1972, without appealing to the Supreme Court. The court's decision was based on findings by the Truth and Reconciliation Commission. Investigations revealed that Air Force officials had coerced the members into waiving their right to appeal. The members were falsely promised that if they did not appeal to the Supreme Court (which would have exposed the unit's existence to the public), their lives would be spared, and they would be deployed to the Vietnam War. This ruling paves the way for the case to be heard by the Supreme Court 51 years after the execution, potentially re-evaluating the judicial process that led to their deaths. A similar petition filed by the cousin of Kim Chang-gu, another executed member, was dismissed. The court ruled that a cousin does not fall within the category of direct lineage required to file for a restoration of appeal rights under current South Korean law.

== Sources ==
- The Korea Times: Military Admits 'Silmido Unit' for First Time
- NKIDP: Crisis and Confrontation on the Korean Peninsula: 1968–1969, A Critical Oral History
