= Silmido (film) =

2003 South Korean historical action film

- Theatrical poster
- Hangul: 실미도
- Hanja: 實尾島
- RR: Silmido
- MR: Silmido
- Directed by: Kang Woo-suk
- Written by: Kim Hie-jae
- Produced by: Jonathan Kim; Lee Jong-sun
- Starring: Sul Kyung-gu; Ahn Sung-ki; Huh Joon-ho; Jung Jae-young
- Cinematography: Kim Sung-bok
- Edited by: Ko Im-pyo
- Music by: Jo Yeong-wook
- Distributed by: Cinema Service
- Release date: 24 December 2003 (South Korea)
- Running time: 135 minutes
- Country: South Korea
- Language: Korean
- Budget: US$8.5 million

Silmido (Korean: 실미도) is a 2003 South Korean action drama film directed by Kang Woo-suk. It is based on the 1999 novel Silmido by Baek Dong-ho, which in turn is based on the true story of Unit 684. Some parts of the film are dramatizations, as the actual details of certain events remain unknown. The film was both critically well received and a financial success, and was the first film in South Korea to attract a box office audience of over 10 million viewers.

== Plot ==
On 21 January 1968, 31 North Korean commandos of Unit 124 are shown to have infiltrated South Korea in a failed mission to assassinate President Park Chung Hee.

As a means of retaliation, the Republic of Korea Armed Forces assembled a team of 31 social outcasts including criminals on death row and life imprisonment, in a plot to kill Kim Il Sung. The team is designated 'Unit 684'. The recruits are taken to the island of Silmido for training. The mission is offered to the recruits as the only way to redeem themselves and show their loyalty to their country. If they succeed, they will win their freedom and a new life. With this goal in mind, the recruits undergo several months of training, enduring various forms of extremely vigorous training and regular physical punishment, including being branded. One recruit is killed after he falls from a ropes course.

At the end of their training, they are dispatched on their mission to North Korea, but are recalled not long after their departure. It is revealed that the project has been called off, as the government attempts a peaceful reconciliation with the North. The recruits return to Silmido discouraged and frustrated. Shortly afterwards two of the Unit 684 members escape from their barracks and rape a female doctor. They are quickly discovered, and believing that they will be executed, decide to commit suicide. One kills the other at his request but is apprehended before he is able to kill himself. The apprehended soldier is then returned to the camp, tied up, and made to watch his fellow Unit 684 members being beaten by the guards for the two men's betrayal. Enraged, one of the Unit 684 members being beaten is able to take his guard's bat and kills the tied up soldier for bringing disgrace to the unit.

To keep the plot to kill Kim Il Sung unknown to the outside world, the South Korean Central Intelligence Agency decide to kill all the members of Unit 684. The unit's commander protests, but is told that if his troops failed to follow this order, they too would be killed alongside Unit 684. Torn between his duty to follow orders and his personal honor, the commander intentionally leaks this information to one of the Unit 684 members. The Unit, realizing they are going to be killed that same night, make plans to mutiny. They attack and kill the majority of their guards, and find out from one of the guards that they legally no longer exist, and never would have received recognition for their mission if it succeeded, nor even be allowed to return to society. They decide to escape from the island and make their story known. The 20 remaining members of Unit 684 capture a bus containing civilians and head to Seoul. An official pronouncement is heard over the radio that 20 "armed communist agents" have infiltrated the country, and a state of emergency is declared. After charging through one army roadblock and winning a firefight they are eventually stopped and surrounded by soldiers in front of the Yuhan Corporation building in Dongjak District, Seoul. A firefight ensues, with the Republic of Korea Army showing no regard for the welfare of the civilians on board the bus. Most of the Unit 684 members are either killed or wounded, and many South Korean soldiers are also killed. To avoid further bloodshed, the surviving Unit 684 members release the civilian hostages, before committing suicide using their own hand grenades. An investigation into the incident is shown to have been carried out; however the report is not read and is seen to be filed away in storage.

== Production ==
Filming took place mainly in South Korea, but underwater and winter training scenes were filmed in Malta and New Zealand, respectively.

== Reception ==
Silmido was well received by audiences in South Korea, where it was viewed by over 6 million people in its first 26 days, taking in over US$30 million in South Korea during this time alone. Silmido would also gross US$4,540,528 in Japan, as well as US$298,347 from its limited release in the United States.

Silmido would go on to become the first film to have a box office audience of over 10 million in South Korea, and held the record for the most viewed film in theatres until the release of Taegukgi in 2004, which received 11.74 million viewings.

Derek Elley from Variety gave the film a positive review, praising both its production and casting.

== Awards and nominations ==
2004 Baeksang Arts Awards

- Grand Prize for Film

2004 Grand Bell Awards

- Best Supporting Actor – Huh Joon-ho
- Best Adapted Screenplay – Kim Hie-jae
- Best Planning – Jonathan Kim
- Special Jury Prize – Plenus/Cinema Service
- Nomination – Best Film
- Nomination – Best Director – Kang Woo-suk
- Nomination – Best Editing – Ko Im-pyo

2004 Blue Dragon Film Awards

- Best Film
- Best Director – Kang Woo-suk
- Best Supporting Actor – Jung Jae-young
- Nomination – Best Supporting Actor – Huh Joon-ho
- Nomination – Best Screenplay – Kim Hie-jae
- Nomination – Best Cinematography – Kim Sung-bok
- Nomination – Best Art Direction – Jeong Eun-jeong

2004 Korean Film Awards

- Nomination – Best Supporting Actor – Jung Jae-young
- Nomination – Best Supporting Actor – Huh Joon-ho

== Historical accuracy ==
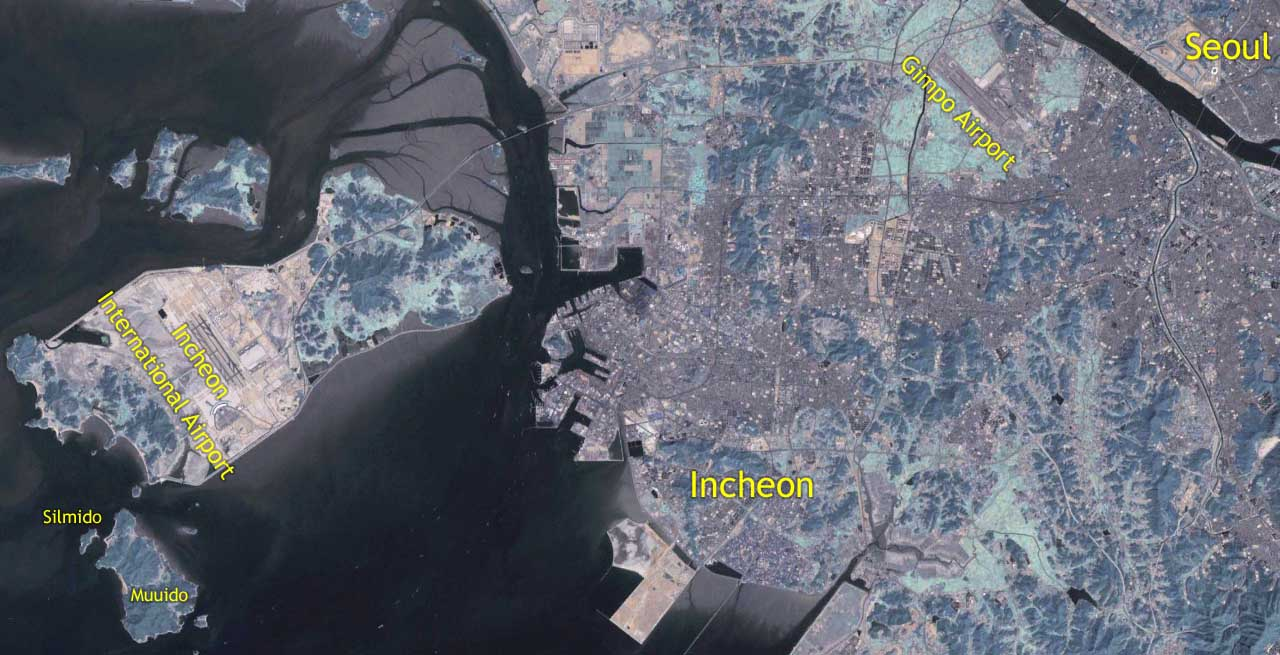
Map of the Incheon coastal area showing the location of Silmido.

The release of this film brought public attention to Unit 684, and in 2006 the South Korean Ministry of National Defense released an official report on the unit and the uprising, officially acknowledging its existence for the first time. Brigadier General Nam Dae-yeon said that the 31 Silmido recruits who made up Unit 684 were part of a Republic of Korea Air Force squadron. Seven died in training and 20 were killed in the uprising. The four who survived were executed after a military trial in 1972. Nam stated that documents describing Unit 684's mission no longer exist, but the government has not denied that its mission was to kill Kim Il Sung.

What actually caused the uprising on August 23, 1971, is unclear. The film shows the government deciding that the recruits had to be killed because they knew too much. The recruits find out and revolt. Jonathan Kim, the film's producer, acknowledges that history is unclear at this point.

Six guards survived the Silmido uprising. One of the guards, Yang Dong Su, confirmed that the unit's mission had been to infiltrate North Korea and kill Kim Il Sung. Yang stated that though the film portrays the 31 recruits as death-row inmates, most were petty criminals. Yang stated that "They were the kind who would get into street fights a lot". Yang also gives his version of why the uprising occurred.

They revolted because they felt that they were never going to get the chance to go to North Korea and that they would never be allowed to leave the island. They were in despair.

— Yang Dong Su

On May 19, 2010, the Seoul Central District Court ordered that the government pay 273 million won in compensation to the families of 21 members of Unit 684. The court found that "the Silmido agents were not informed of the level of danger involved with their training, and the harshness of the training violated their basic human rights" and also acknowledged the emotional pain the government caused by not officially disclosing the agents' deaths to family members until 2006.

Preceded by Friend	Top box office of Korea; 2003–2004	Succeeded by Taegukgi
