= Yeongjong Bridge =

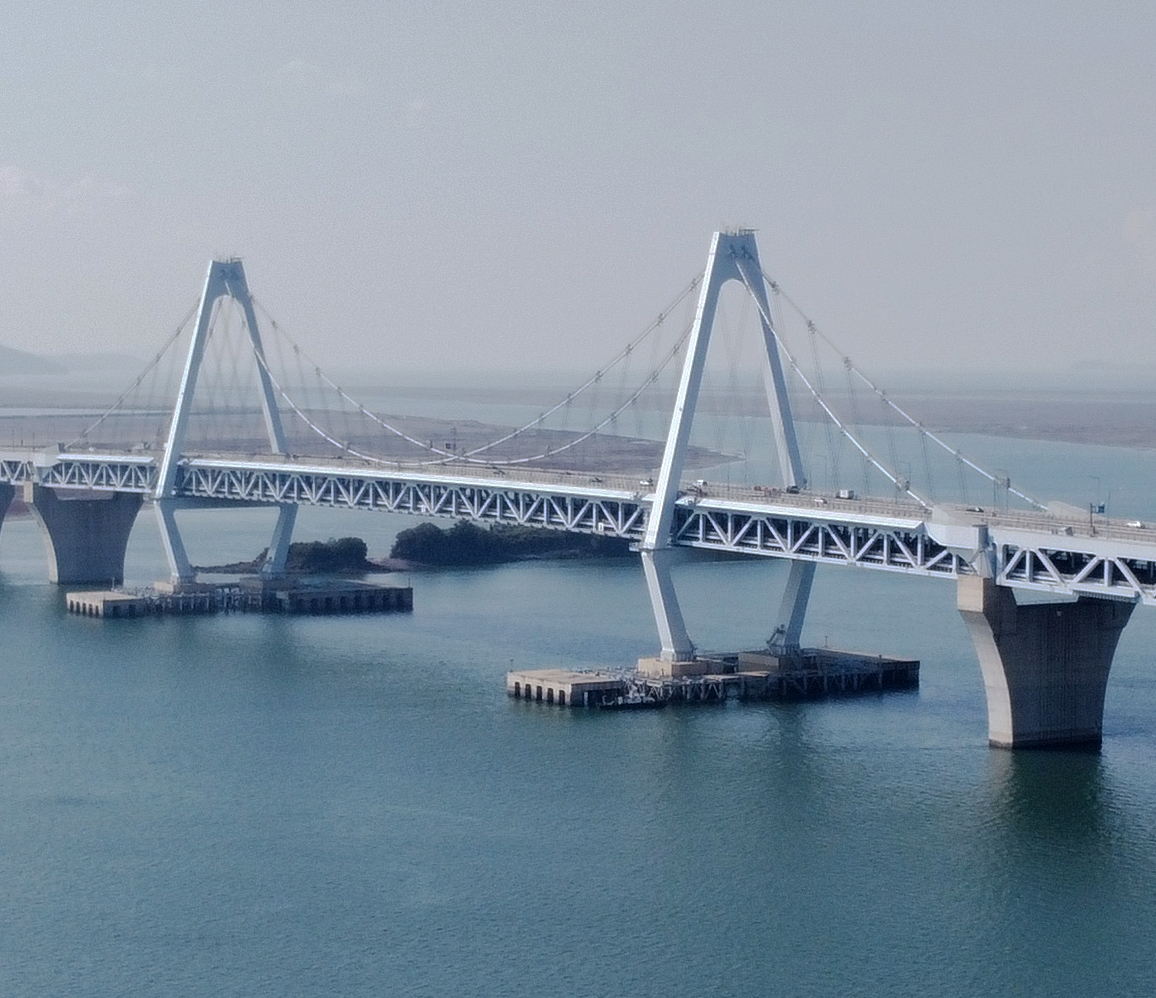
- Coordinates: 37°32′42.5″N 126°34′55.1″E
- Carries: highway, railway
- Locale: Incheon, South Korea
- Official name: Yeongjong Bridge
- Other name: Yeongjong Grand Bridge

Characteristics
- Design: double-deck self-anchored suspension bridge
- Total length: 4,420 m (14,500 ft)
- Longest span: 300 m (980 ft)
- No. of spans: 3

History
- Construction start: November 1995
- Construction end: December 2000
- Construction cost: $1.4billion USD

Location
- Interactive map of Yeongjong Bridge

The Yeongjong Bridge (영종대교) is a self-anchored suspension double-deck road-rail bridge located in Incheon, South Korea, linking Yeongjong Island to the Korean mainland. The bridge is part of the Incheon International Airport Expressway and was completed in 2000.

The total length of the bridge is 4,420 m (14,500 ft), it includes a main suspension bridge section of 550 m (1,800 ft), a truss bridge section of 2,250 m (7,380 ft) and a steel box girder bridge section of 1,620 m (5,310 ft).

The main suspension bridge has two decks and carries both motor vehicles and AREX train.

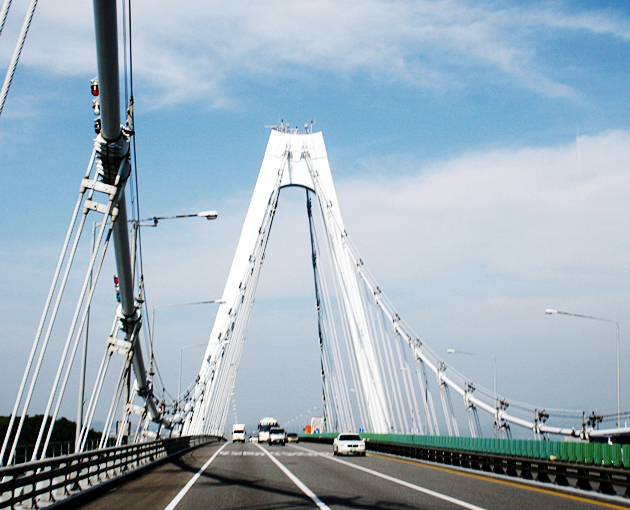
Yeongjong Bridge upper deck

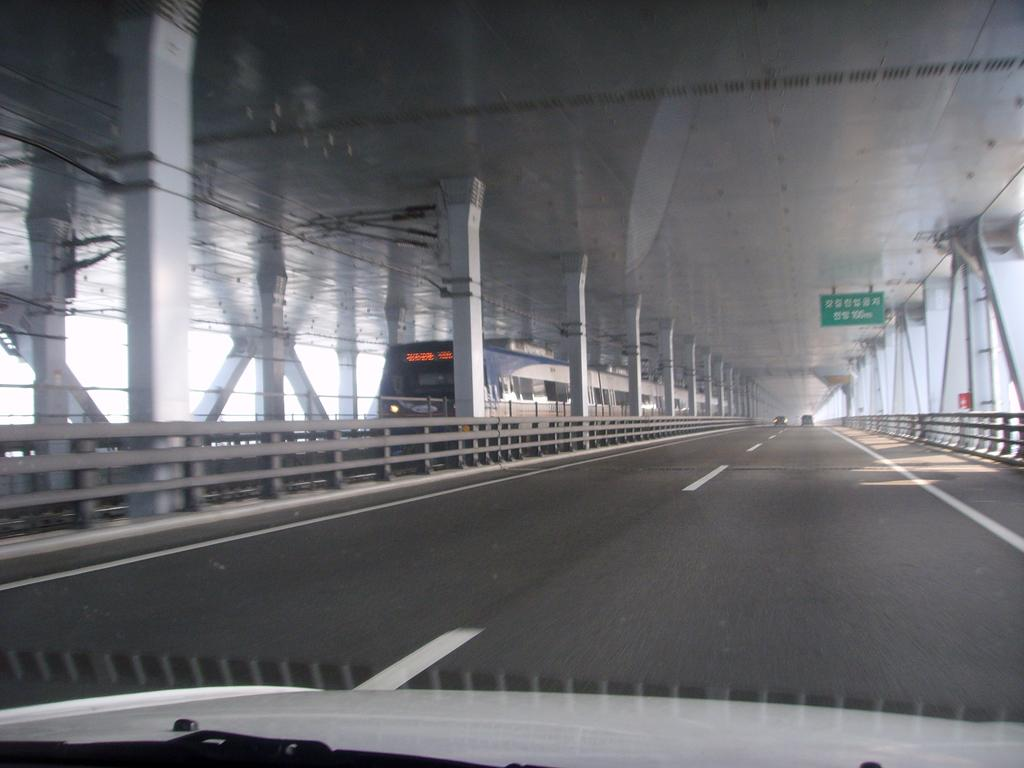
Yeongjong Bridge lower deck with AREX train

== See also ==
- Transportation in South Korea
- List of bridges in South Korea
- Incheon International Airport
- Incheon Bridge
