= Self-anchored suspension bridge =

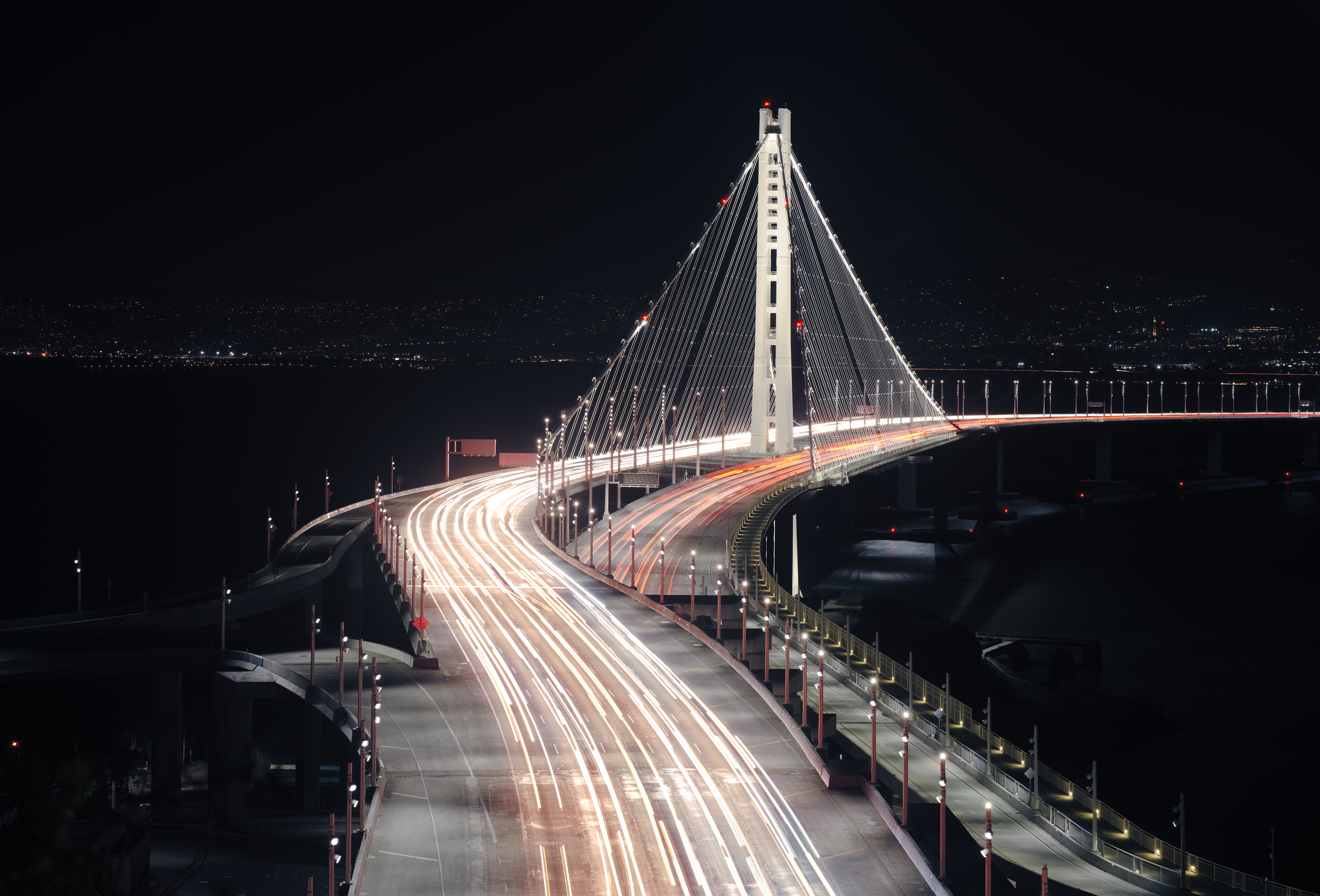
- The main span of the eastern span of the San Francisco–Oakland Bay Bridge, the largest example of a self-anchored suspension bridge in the world.
- Span range: Medium
- Material: Steel rope, steel eye-bar, concrete spar, post-tension-ed concrete deck
- Movable: No
- Design effort: high
- Falsework required: Usually

A self-anchored suspension bridge is a suspension bridge type in which the main cables attach to the ends of the deck, rather than directly to the ground or via large anchorages. The design is well-suited for construction atop elevated piers, or in areas of unstable soils where anchorages would be difficult to construct.

Difference between types of bridges

Suspension bridge with the main cables attached to the ground (black squares)

Self-anchored suspension bridge; the main cables are attached to the end of the road deck (horizontal blue line)

The load path of the self-anchored suspension (SAS) bridge converts vertical loads into tension forces in the main cables which are countered by compressive forces in the towers and deck. The system balances forces internally without external anchorage requirements, making it suitable for sites where large horizontal forces are difficult to anchor. This is similar to the method used in a tied-arch bridge where arch member compression is balanced by tension in the deck.

== History ==
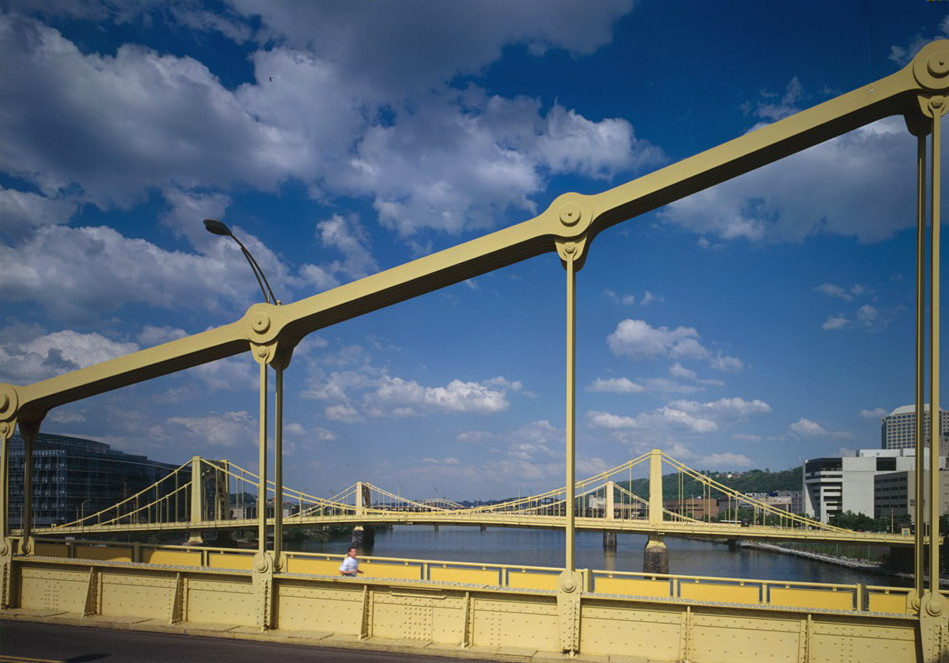
The Three Sisters (Pittsburgh), the first self-anchored suspension spans, opened in 1926 to 1928.

The self-anchored suspension bridge form originated in the mid-19th century, with a published description by Austrian engineer Josef Langer in 1859 and U.S. Patent No. 71,955 by American engineer Charles Bender in 1867. The form was applied to a handful of Rhine River crossings in Germany during the first half of the twentieth century.

== Examples ==
- The SAS portion of the eastern span replacement of the San Francisco–Oakland Bay Bridge (2013) is a single-tower asymmetric bridge with a main span of 385 m (1,263 ft). It is currently the largest SAS bridge in the world.
- The Pingsheng Bridge (2006) in China is a single-tower bridge with a main span of 350 m (1,148 ft).
- The Konohana Bridge (1990) in Japan and the Yeoungjong Grand Bridge (2000) in South Korea, both have two towers with a central span of 300 m (984 ft).
- The Three Sisters Bridges of Pittsburgh are the earliest examples (1924–28) of this bridge type in the US.
- The Chelsea Bridge (1937) in London, England.
- The Gagarin Street Bridge in Arkhangelsk, Russia.
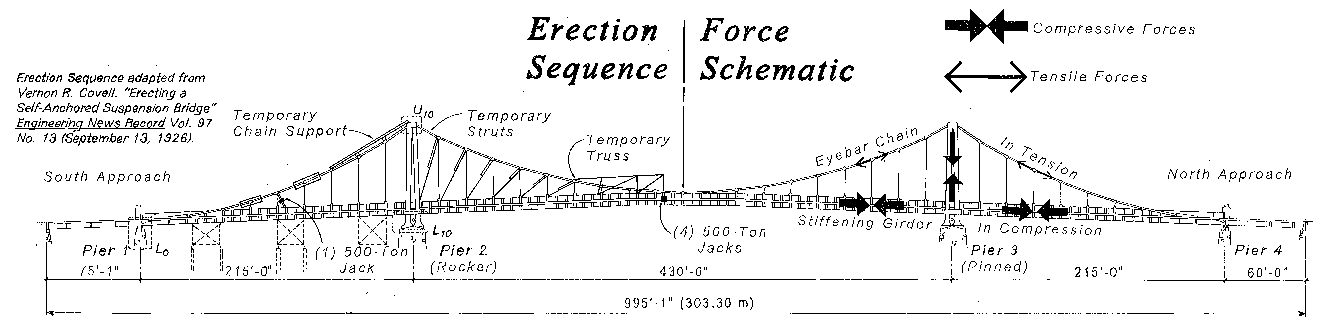
Construction falsework on left; force schematic on right

Elevation and plan view of single-tower SAS bridge portion of 2013 eastern span of San Francisco-Oakland bay bridge. Not shown: cable is continuous across the western end, under roadway.

== Construction method ==
The nature of the self-anchored suspension bridge necessitates the temporary construction of falsework, in the form of compression struts or an underdeck, before work begins on the permanent structure. This requirement is inherent in the structure's definition.

In the absence of suspension via cableage, the deck of a suspension bridge is incapable of self-support. On a suspension bridge of the more usual earth-anchored type, both of the primary (i.e., horizontal) cable's anchorages exist prior to construction in the form of solid terrain. In the self-anchored suspension bridge, however, the cable must be anchored to the bridge deck, which has yet to be built and will not bear its own weight; ergo, falsework must be employed until the final method of suspension is possible.

The cables apply strong axial forces onto the bridge girders, which may require strengthening. Therefore, self-anchored suspension bridge spans tend to be smaller than earth-anchored ones.

== Cable anchors ==
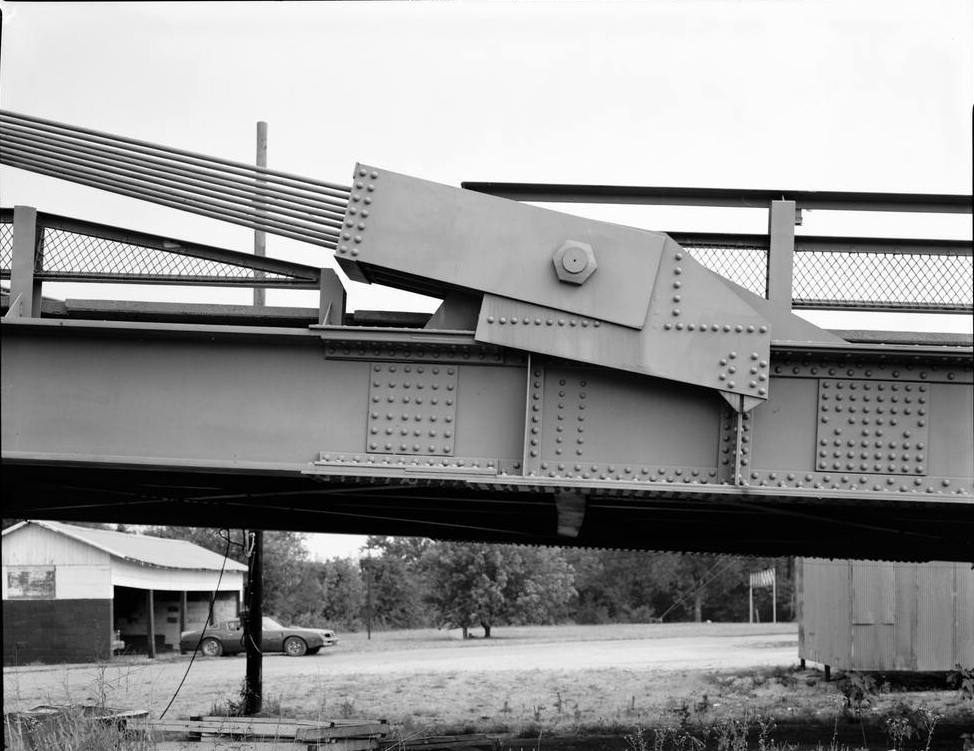
Hutsonville Bridge cable anchor detail

As in a traditional suspension bridge, the primary cable type may be multiple parallel independent cables as in the image at right of the Hutsonville Bridge (no longer extant), or eyebars, or a more conventional composite cable.

== See also ==
- Eastern span replacement of the San Francisco–Oakland Bay Bridge
