= Cheongna Haneul Bridge =

Cheongna Haneul Bridge 청라하늘대교
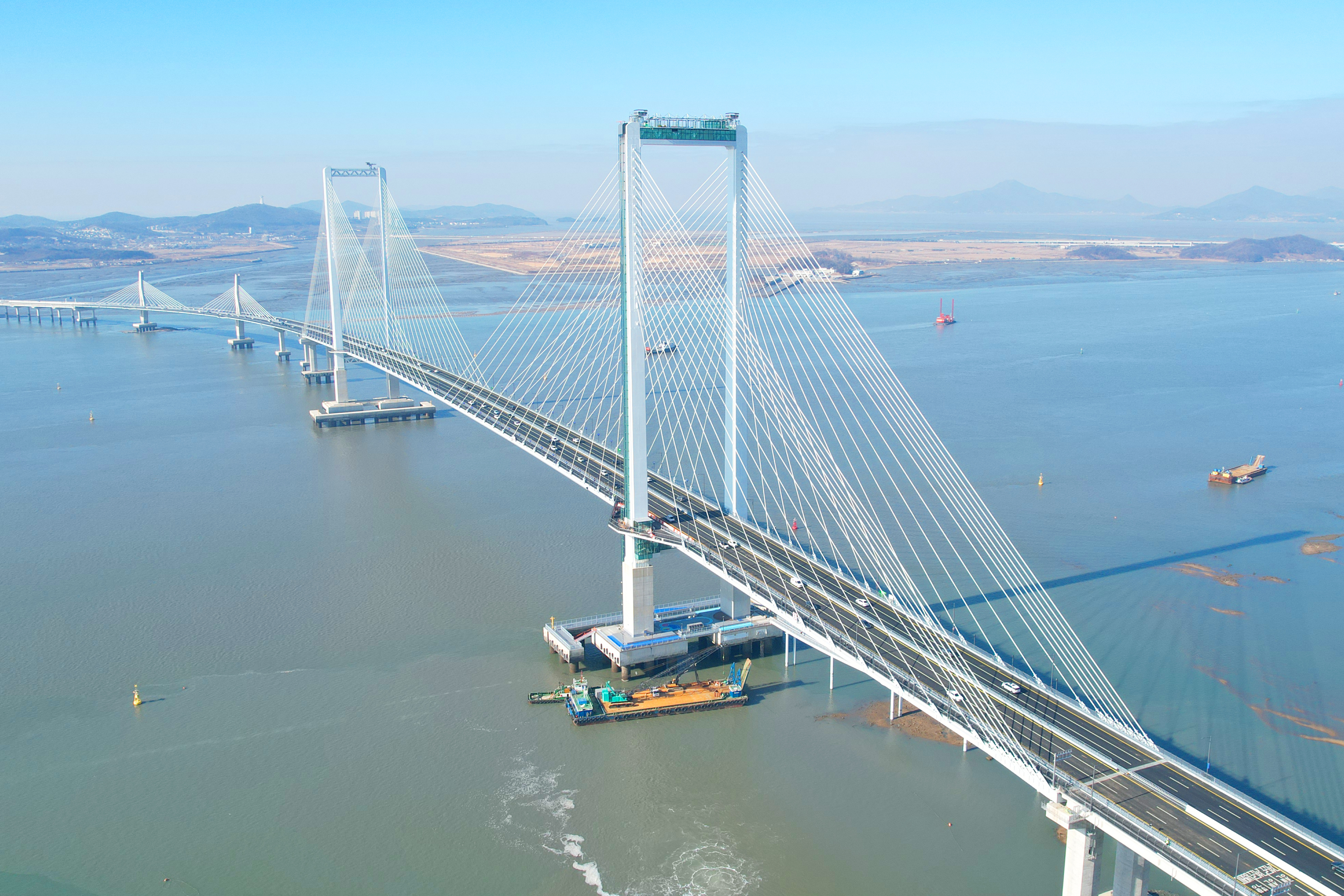
- Coordinates: 37.516°N 126.589°E
- Carries: 6-lane boulevard, pedestrian and cycleways
- Locale: Incheon, South Korea

Characteristics
- Design: Cable-stayed bridge
- Total length: 4.68 km (2.91 mi)
- Longest span: 560 m (1,840 ft)

History
- Construction start: 2021
- Construction end: 2026
- Opened: January 5, 2026

Location
- Interactive map of Cheongna Haneul Bridge

The Cheongna Haneul Bridge (Korean: 청라하늘대교; Hanja: 菁羅하늘大橋; RR: Cheongna Haneul Daegyo) is a reinforced concrete cable-stayed bridge located in Incheon, South Korea. Construction began in December 2021 and the bridge opened in January 2026. The Third Landing Bridge (제3연륙교) was a tentative name before its opening. The bridge connects Cheongna International City in Seo District, Incheon and Jung District, Incheon on Yeongjongdo providing a third link to Incheon International Airport. In addition to a six-lane highway, pedestrian and cycle lanes are installed, together with an observatory on one of the bridge's 180-metre (590 ft) towers. The bridge connects to the Gyeongin Expressway and is projected to allow travel times from Yeongjongdo of 30 minutes to Yeouido and 45 minutes to Gangnam.
