= Yeongjongdo =

Island in Incheon, South Korea

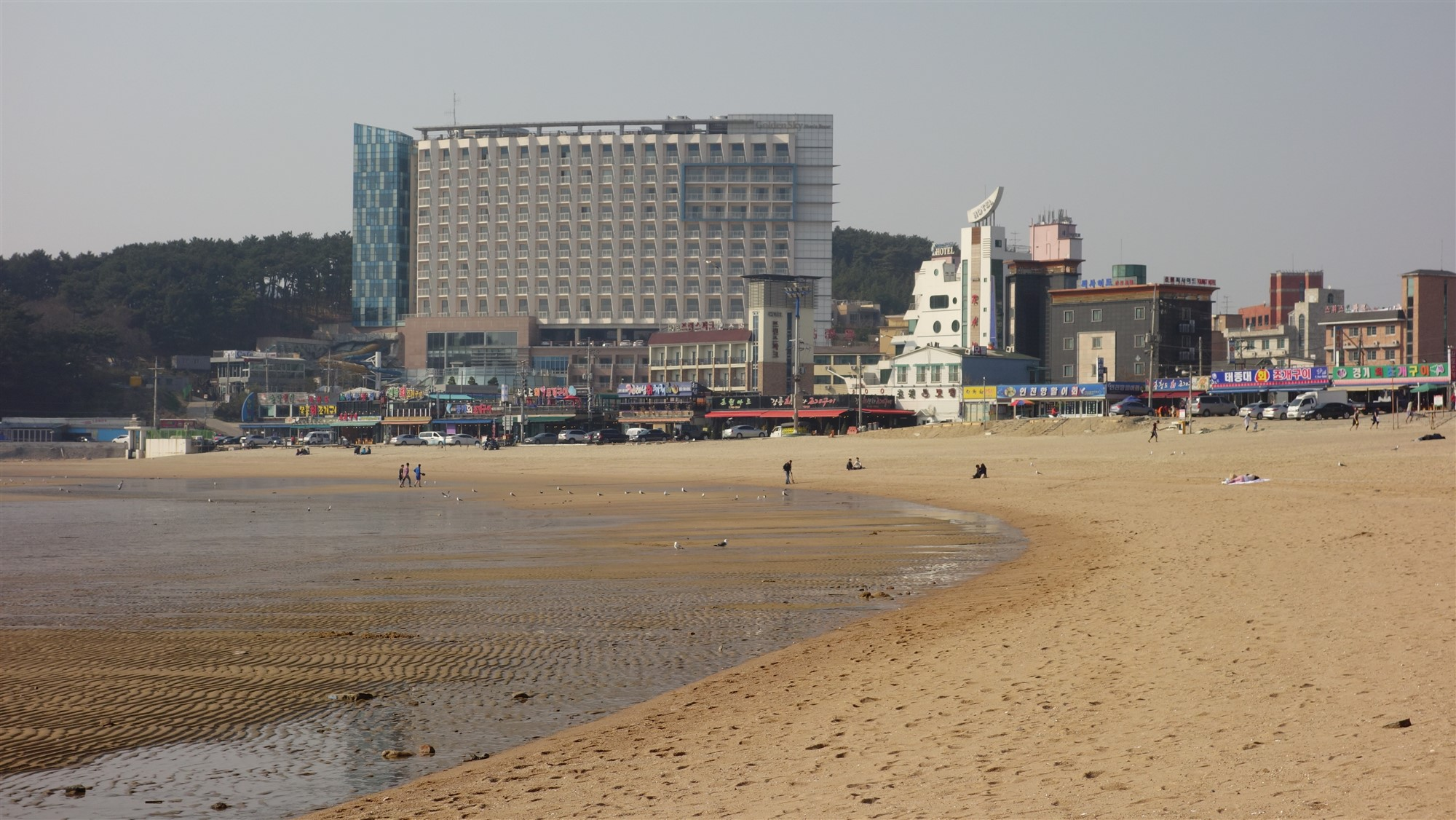
- Eulwangri Beach on the island (2014)
- Interactive map of Yeongjongdo

Geography
- Coordinates: 37°29′N 126°31′E

Korean name
- Hangul: 영종도
- Hanja: 永宗島
- RR: Yeongjongdo
- MR: Yŏngjongdo

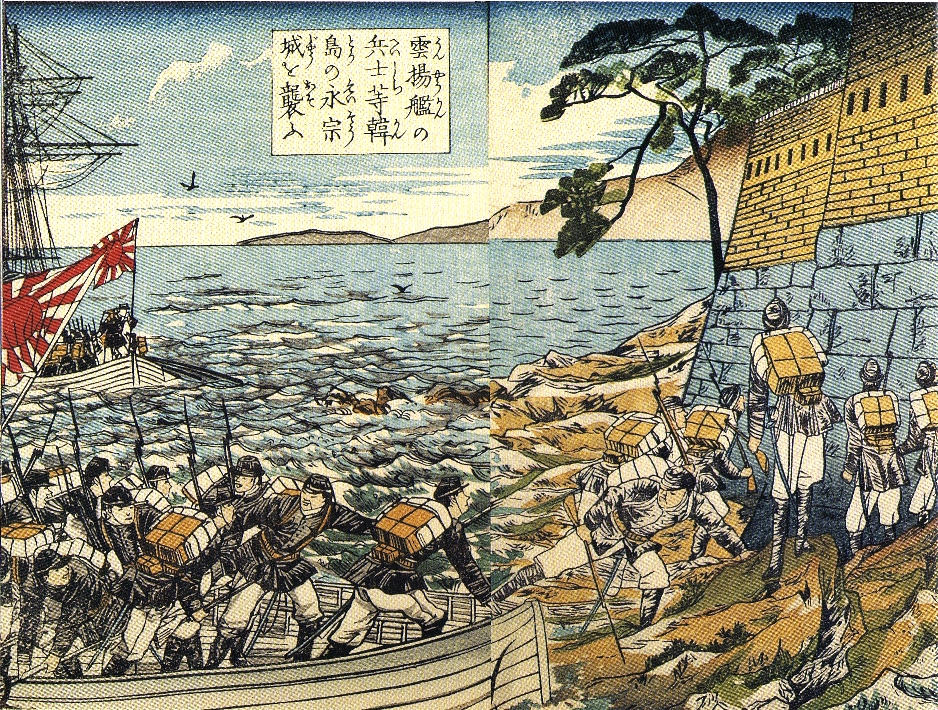
Japanese marines landing from the Unyo at Yeongjong Island (永宗島) during the Ganghwa Island incident in 1875

Yeongjong Island (Korean: 영종도) is an island in Yeongjong District, South Korea. It contains Incheon International Airport as well as small villages, farms, and beaches.

The previously separate Yongyu, Sammok, and Sinbul Islands have been joined to Yeongjong Island by an area of reclaimed land built for the construction of the airport.

== Description ==
The island is an exclave of Incheon's Jung District, and can be accessed from the mainland via three bridges, Yeongjong Bridge, Cheongna Haneul Bridge, and Incheon Bridge.

In addition to the airport, the island is known for Eulwangni Beach and Wangsan Beach on the west coast, and the temple Yongguksa in the central part. The island also has a ferry terminal on its southwest coast for daily ferry service to the island Muuido.

The Incheon Airport Maglev connects the airport to Yongyu station near the ferry terminal.

== Incheon Free Economic Zone ==
Yeongjong Island is considered part of the Incheon Free Economic Zone with a concentration on airport logistics, travel, and tourism. The city of Incheon is also investing in its own airline which will be operated from Yeongjong Island.

In addition to the Incheon Bridge, completed in October 2009, there are a number of projects either proposed or already under construction on the island. Transportation updates and expansions worth US$318 million, including seven light rail lines for the island with six bridges, two tunnels of length 6500 meters, and two stations, were completed in 2002. Other projects include:

- Unbuk multi-leisure Complex. An area focusing on tourism and leisure businesses and a theme park. Residential areas here will be aimed at foreign residents.
- Yongyu-Muui Tourist Complex. The construction of a marina and general tourism zone.
- Yeongjong Sky City. A plan for the whole urban region, to establish air traffic logistics businesses and livable urban space.

== See also ==
- Midan City
