= Administration Complex station =

Metro station in Incheon, South Korea

M03 합동청사 Administration Complex
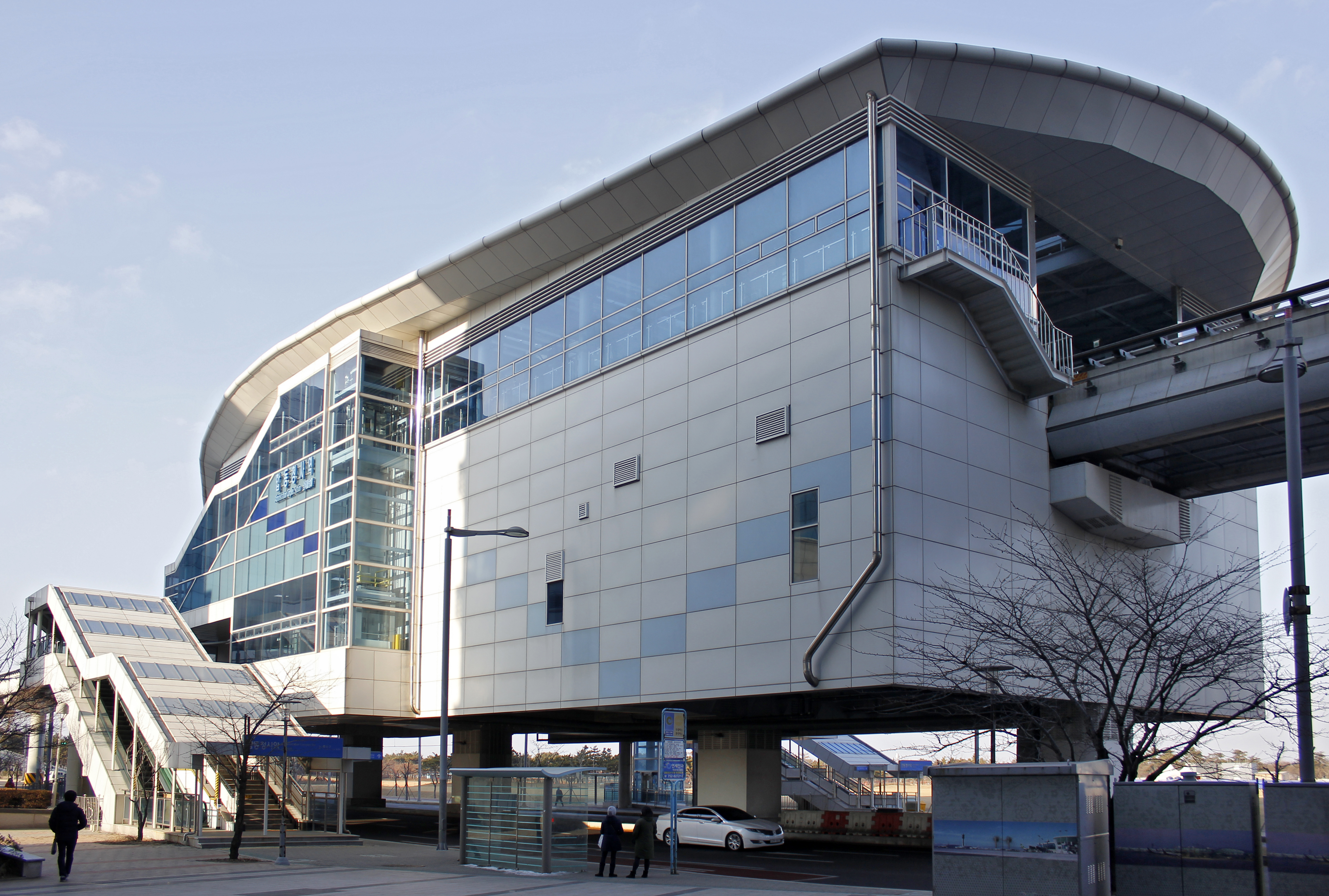

Korean name
- Hangul: 합동청사역
- Hanja: 合同廳舍驛
- RR: Hapdongcheongsa-yeok
- MR: Haptongch'ŏngsa-yŏk

General information
- Location: Unseo-dong, Jung District, Incheon
- Coordinates: 37°26′26″N 126°27′31″E
- Operator: Incheon International Airport Corporation
- Line: Incheon Airport Maglev
- Platforms: 2
- Tracks: 2

History
- Opened: February 3, 2016

Services
Preceding station	Incheon Transit Corporation	Following station
Long Term Parking towards Incheon Int'l Airport Terminal 1	Incheon Airport Maglev	Paradise City towards Yongyu
Location

Administration Complex station (Korean: 합동청사역; Hanja: 合同廳舍驛) is a station of the Incheon Airport Maglev in Unseo-dong, Jung District, Incheon, South Korea.
