= Paradise City station =

Metro station in Incheon, South Korea

M04 파라다이스시티 Paradise City
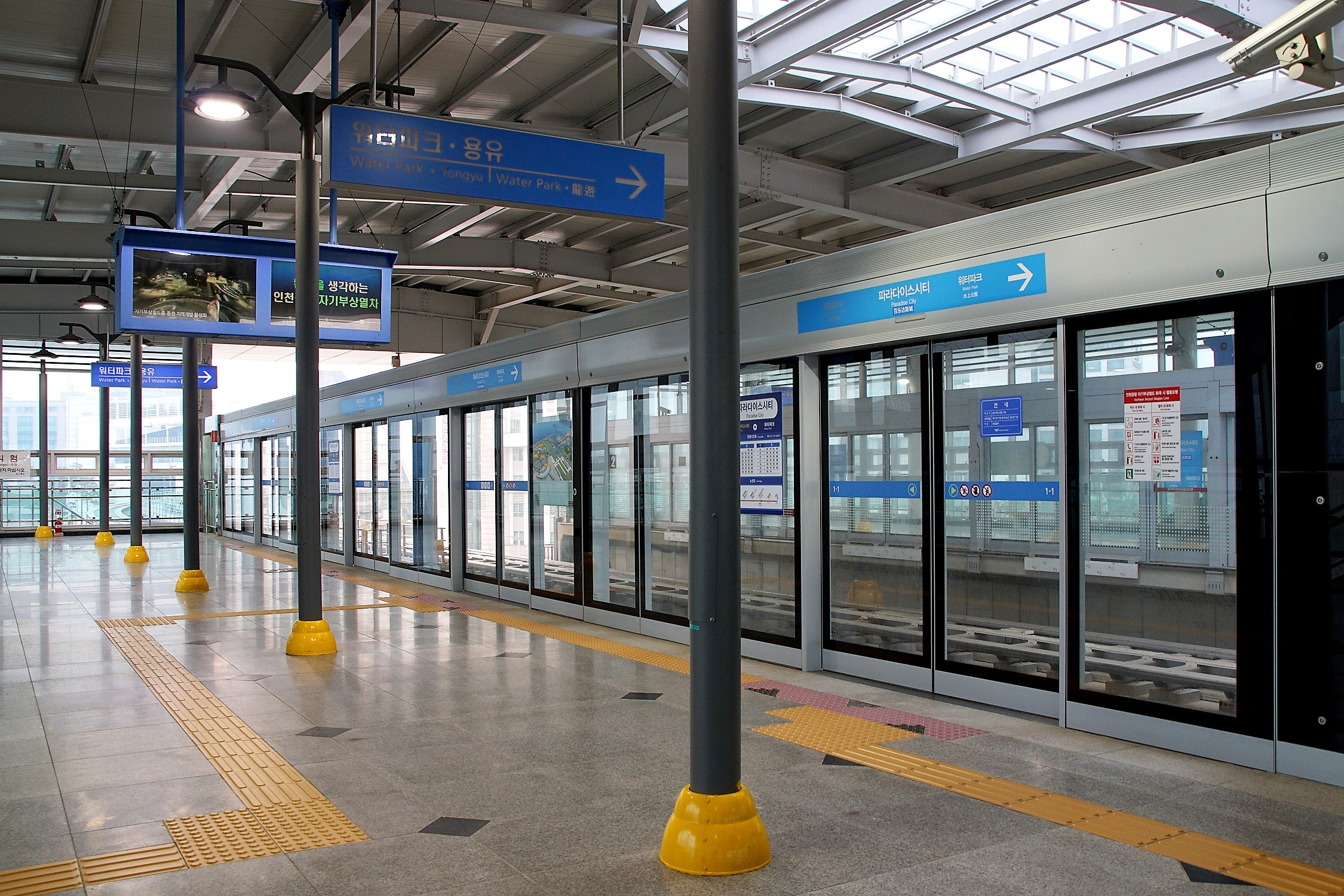

Korean name
- Hangul: 파라다이스시티역
- Hanja: 파라다이스시티驛
- Revised Romanization: Paradaiseu siti yeok
- McCune–Reischauer: P'aradaisŭ sit'i yŏk

General information
- Location: Unseo-dong, Jung District, Incheon
- Coordinates: 37°26′14″N 126°27′35″E
- Operator: Incheon International Airport Corporation
- Line: Incheon Airport Maglev
- Platforms: 2
- Tracks: 2

History
- Opened: February 3, 2016

Services
Preceding station	Incheon Transit Corporation	Following station
Administration Complex towards Incheon Int'l Airport Terminal 1	Incheon Airport Maglev	Water Park towards Yongyu
Location

Paradise City station (Korean: 파라다이스시티역) is a station of the Incheon Airport Maglev in Unseo-dong, Jung District, Incheon, South Korea. It was formerly known as International Business Center station (Korean: 국제업무단지역; Hanja: 國際業務團地驛).
