= Long Term Parking station =

Metro station in Incheon, South Korea

M02 장기주차장 Long Term Parking
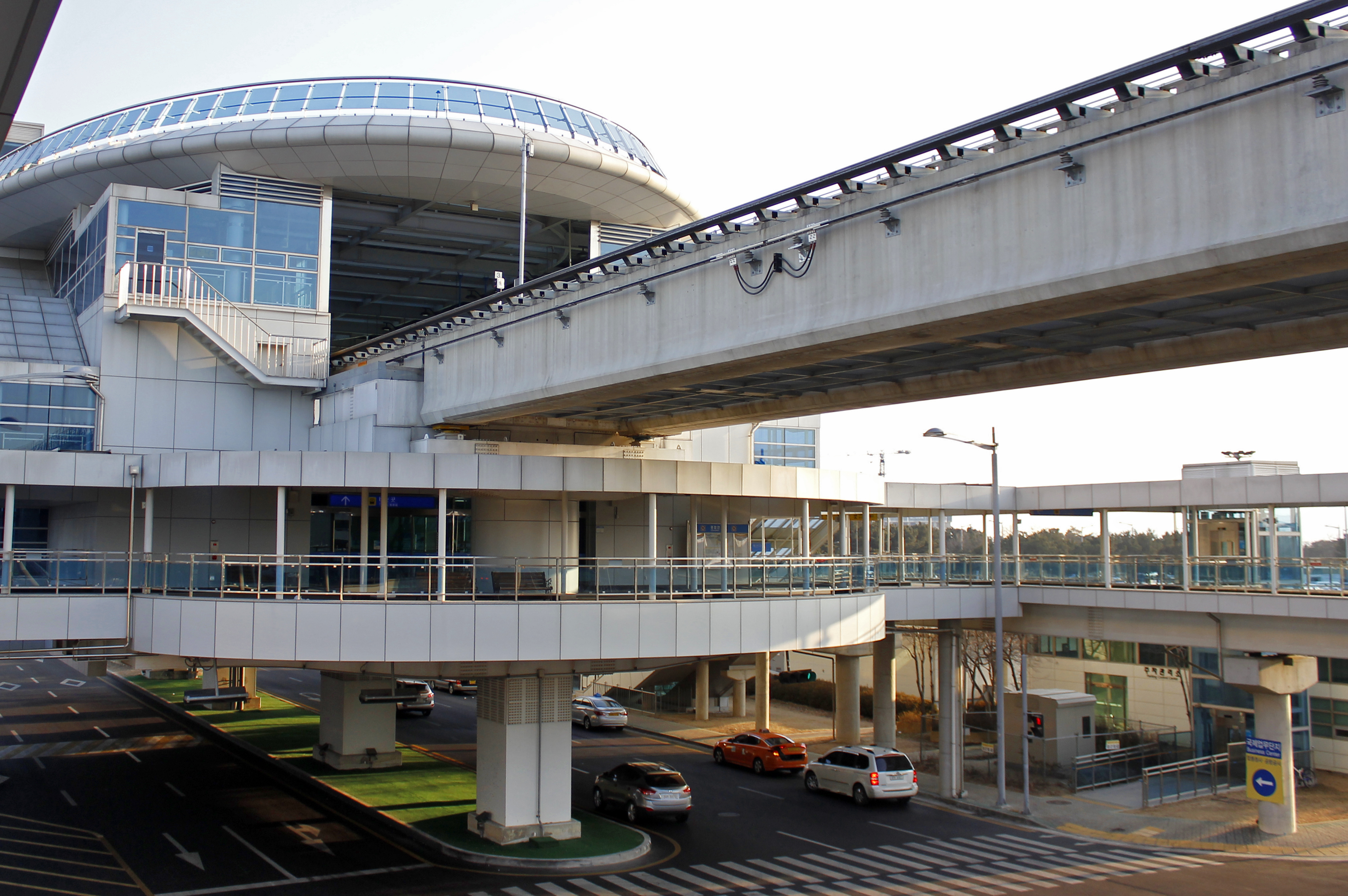

Korean name
- Hangul: 장기주차장역
- Hanja: 長期駐車場驛
- Revised Romanization: Janggi juchajang yeok
- McCune–Reischauer: Changgi chuch'ajang yŏk

General information
- Location: Unseo-dong, Jung District, Incheon
- Coordinates: 37°26′38″N 126°27′20″E
- Operator: Incheon International Airport Corporation
- Line: Incheon Airport Maglev
- Platforms: 2
- Tracks: 2

History
- Opened: February 3, 2016

Services
Preceding station	Incheon Transit Corporation	Following station
Incheon Int'l Airport Terminal 1 Terminus	Incheon Airport Maglev	Administration Complex towards Yongyu
Location

Long Term Parking station (Korean: 장기주차장역; Hanja: 長期駐車場驛) is a station of the Incheon Airport Maglev in Unseo-dong, Jung District, Incheon, South Korea. It is the first station after Incheon International Airport itself.
