= Water Park station =

Metro station in Incheon, South Korea

M05 워터파크 Water Park

Korean name
- Hangul: 워터파크역
- Hanja: 워터파크驛
- RR: Woteopakeu-yeok
- MR: Wŏt'ŏp'ak'ŭ-yŏk

General information
- Location: Unseo-dong, Jung District, Incheon
- Coordinates: 37°25′45″N 126°26′03″E
- Operator: Incheon International Airport Corporation
- Line: Incheon Airport Maglev
- Platforms: 2
- Tracks: 2

History
- Opened: February 3, 2016

Services
Preceding station	Incheon Transit Corporation	Following station
Paradise City towards Incheon Int'l Airport Terminal 1	Incheon Airport Maglev	Yongyu Terminus
Location

Water Park station (Korean: 워터파크역) is a station of the Incheon Airport Maglev in Unseo-dong, Jung District, Incheon, South Korea.
