= Incheon International Airport Cargo Terminal station =

Metro station in Incheon, South Korea

공항화물청사; Incheon Int'l Airport Cargo Terminal
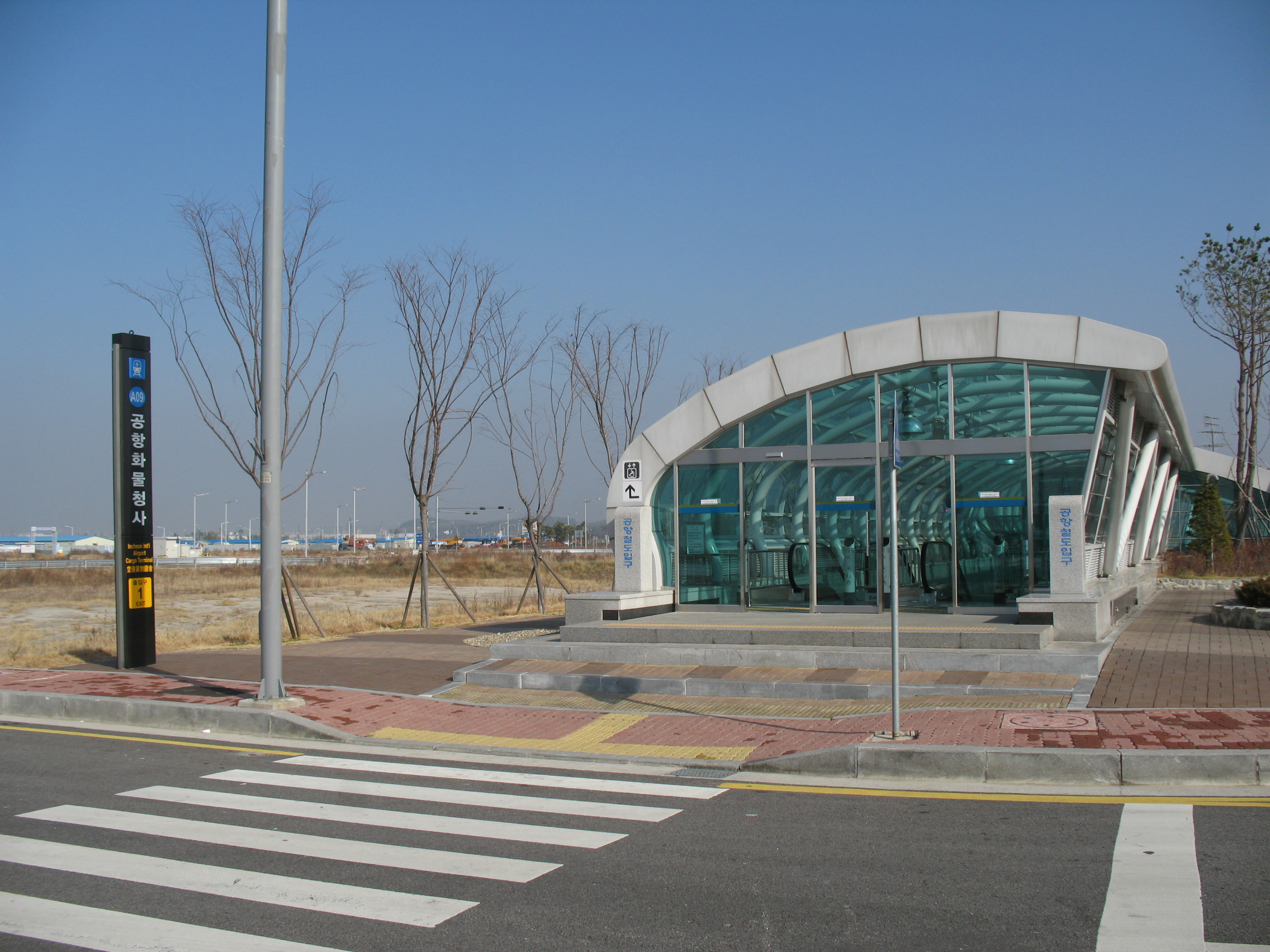
- Incheon International Airport Cargo Terminal station exit No. 1

Korean name
- Hangul: 공항화물청사역
- Hanja: 空港貨物廳舍驛
- Revised Romanization: Gonghanghwamulcheongsa-yeok
- McCune–Reischauer: Konghanghwamulch'ŏngsa-yŏk

General information
- Location: 2844-2 Unseo-dong, 86 Gonghangdaero 135; Bongil, Yeongjong-gu, Incheon
- Coordinates: 37.458236°N 126.476369°E
- Operator: Airport Railroad Co., Ltd.
- Line: AREX
- Platforms: 2 (2 side platforms)
- Tracks: 2

Construction
- Structure type: Underground

History
- Opened: March 23, 2007

Services
Preceding station	Seoul Metropolitan Subway	Following station
Unseo towards Seoul	AREX Local	Incheon Int'l Airport Terminal 1 towards Incheon Int'l Airport Terminal 2
Location

Incheon International Airport Cargo Terminal station or Airport Cargo Terminal is an underground station on AREX. The station's name is derived from the cargo terminal of Incheon International Airport.

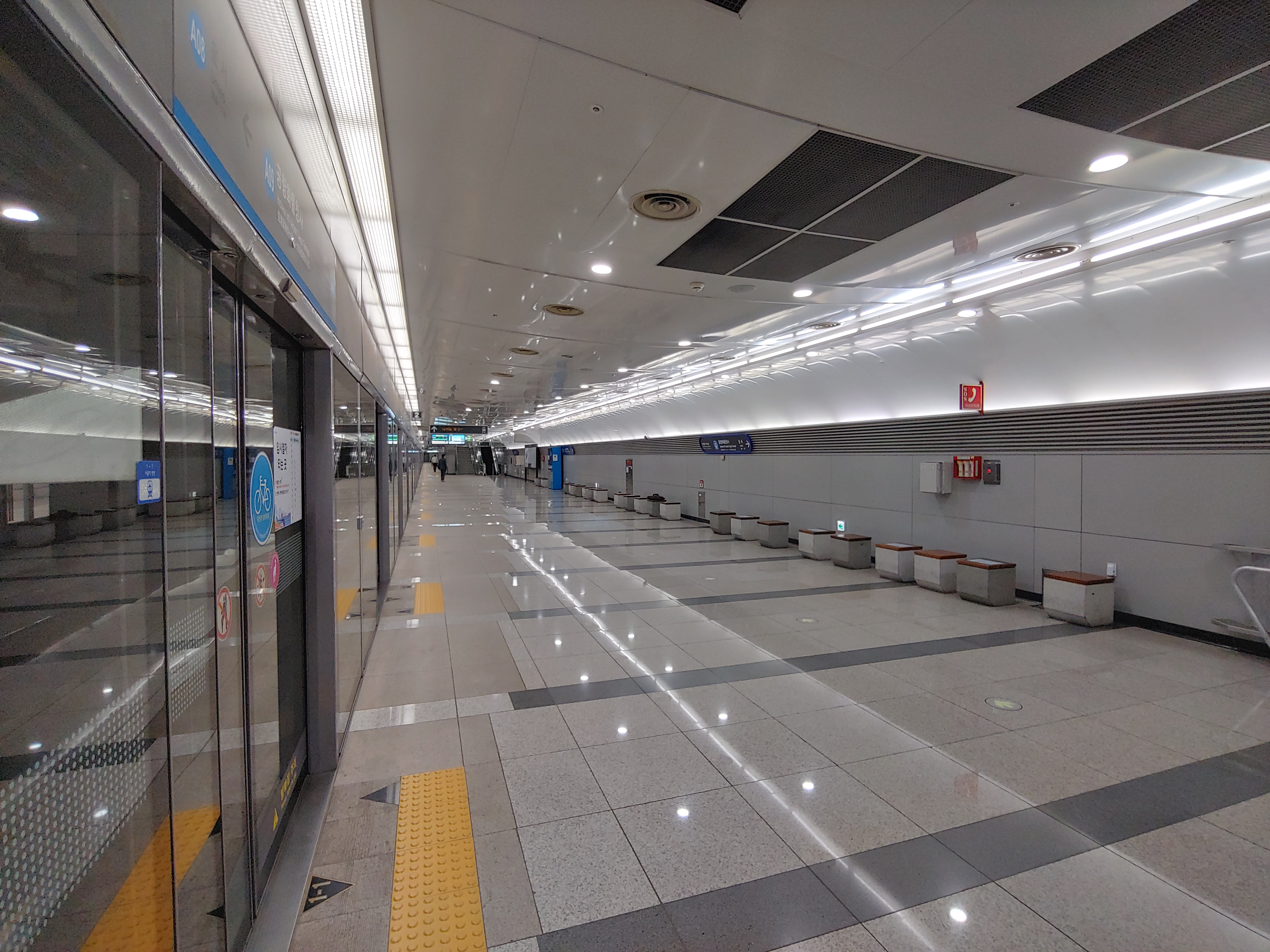
The platform of Incheon International Airport Cargo Terminal station

== Station layout ==
L2; Platforms	Side platform, doors will open on the right
L2; Platforms	Eastbound	AREX Local toward Incheon Int'l Airport Terminal 2 (Incheon Int'l Airport 1) → AREX Express does not stop here →
L2; Platforms	Westbound	← AREX Local toward Seoul (Unseo) ← AREX Express does not stop here
L2; Platforms	Side platform, doors will open on the right
L1	Concourse	Faregates, Ticketing Machines, Station Control, Shops
G	Street Level	Exits
