= Unseo station =

Metro station in Incheon, South Korea

Coordinates: 37°29′34″N 126°29′37″E

| 운서; Unseo |
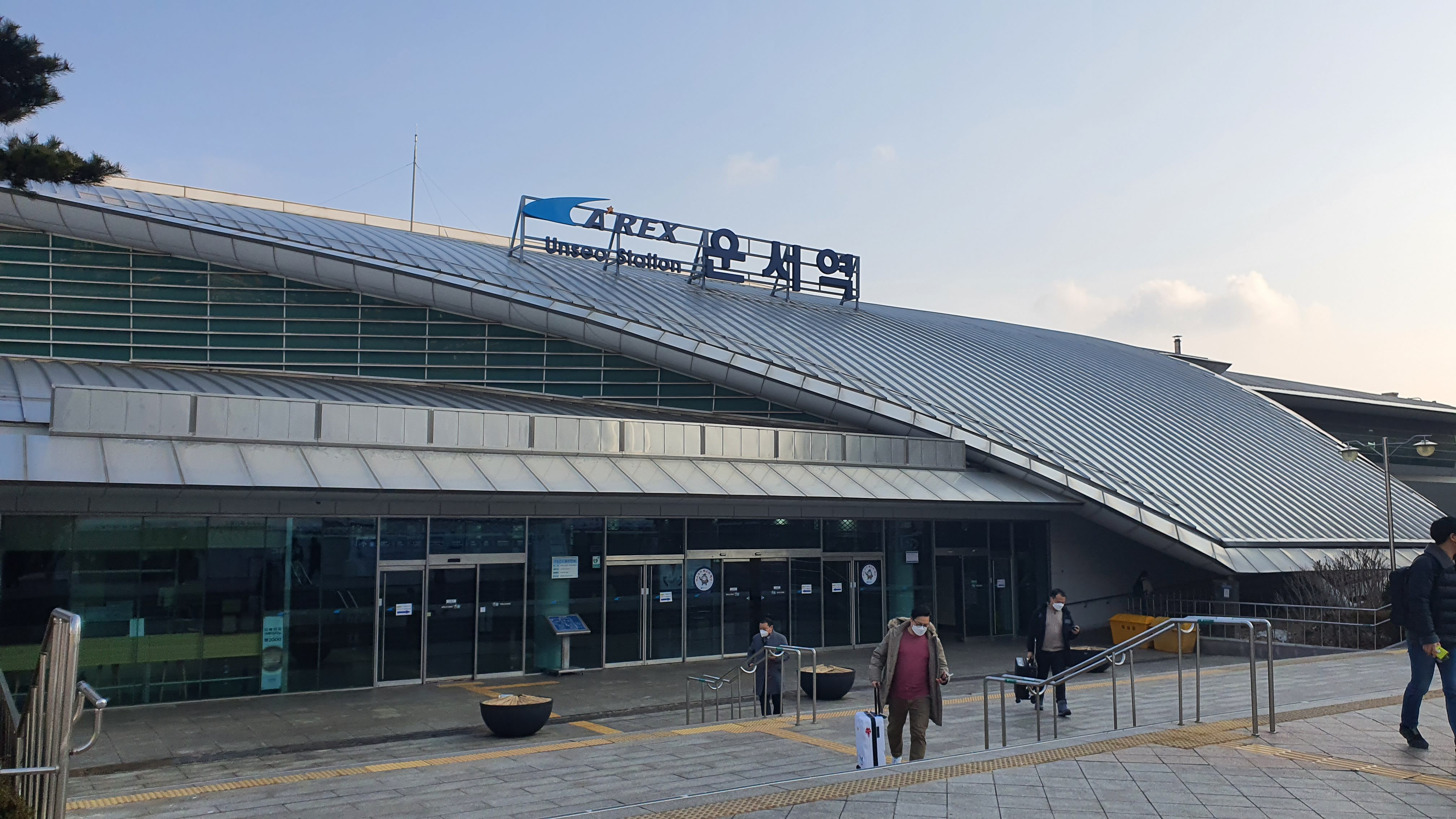
- Unseo station building

Korean name
- Hangul: 운서역
- Hanja: 雲西驛
- Revised Romanization: Unseo-yeok
- McCune–Reischauer: Unsŏ-yŏk

General information
- Location: 1427-30 Unseo-dong, 26 Huinbawiro 59 Bongil, Yeongjong-gu, Incheon
- Operator: Airport Railroad Co., Ltd.
- Line: AREX
- Platforms: 2
- Tracks: 2

Construction
- Structure type: Aboveground

History
- Opened: March 23, 2007

Services
| Preceding station | Seoul Metropolitan Subway | Following station |
|---|---|---|
| Yeongjong towards Seoul | AREX Local | Incheon International Airport Cargo Terminal towards Incheon Int'l Airport Terminal 2 |
Location

Unseo station (Korean: 운서역) is a railway station on AREX. Unseo-dong is the site of Airport Town Square (공항신도시), a relatively new town with hotels and other facilities for those going to or coming from Incheon International Airport. Before 2022, Unseo station was the only station in the Seoul Metropolitan Area to not apply transfer discounts. Complaints from residents eventually pressured the government to apply the discount.

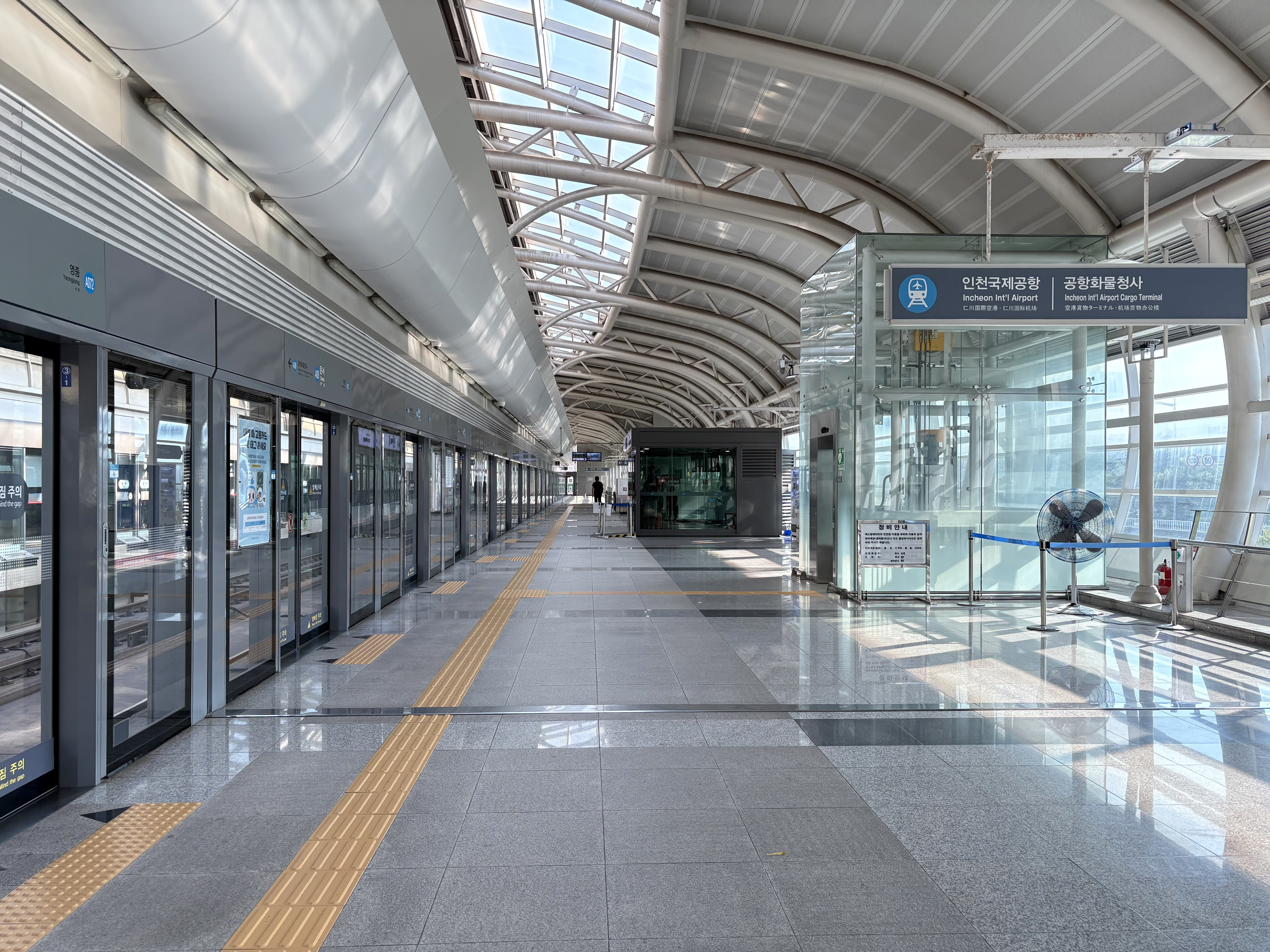
Station platform

== Station layout ==
| L2; Platform level | Side platform, doors will open on the left |
| L2; Platform level | Eastbound | AREX Local toward Seoul (Yeongjong) → AREX Express does not stop here → |
| L2; Platform level | Westbound | ← AREX Local toward Incheon International Airport Terminal 2 (Incheon Int'l Airport Cargo Terminal) ← AREX Express does not stop here |
| L2; Platform level | Side platform, doors will open on the left |

| L1; Concourse | Lobby | Customer service, shops, vending machines, ATMs |

| G | Street level | Exit |
