= ECOBEE (Maglev) =

Maglev line in South Korea

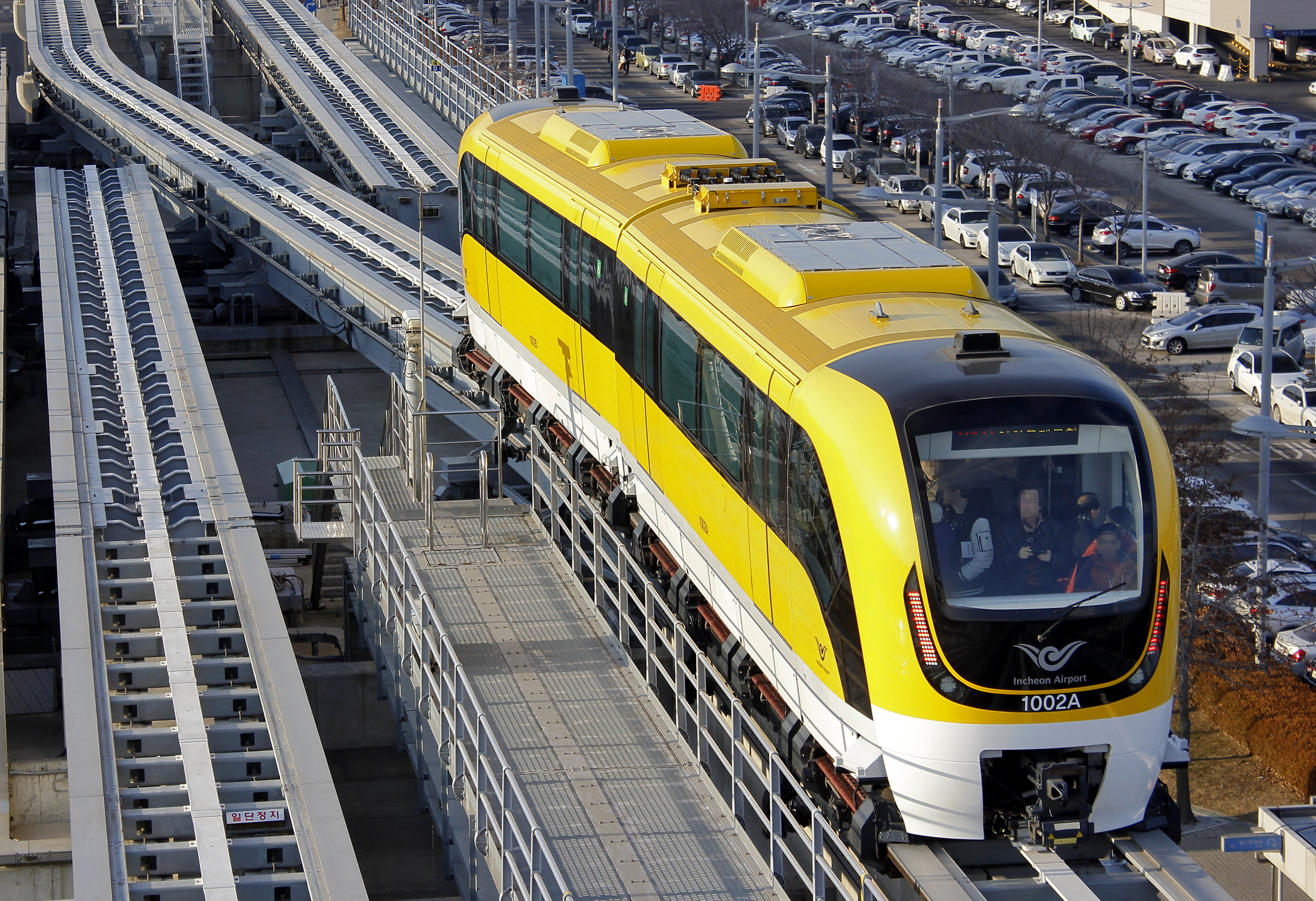
- ECOBEE
- Stock type: Maglev
- Manufacturer: Hyundai Rotem, Korea Institute of Machinery & Materials
- Constructed: 2009–2012
- Operators: Incheon International Airport Corporation

Specifications
- Width: 2,700 millimetres (110 in)
- Height: 3,450 millimetres (136 in)
- Maximum speed: 110 kilometres per hour (68 mph)
- Weight: 19 tonnes (19 long tons; 21 short tons)

ECOBEE (Korean: 에코비) is a South Korean Maglev train developed by the Korea Institute of Machinery & Materials.

== History ==
Ecobee was developed in 2006 as an advanced version of the UTM-02 to create a vehicle that could be operated by metropolitan city-level local governments.

On December 21, 2006, the Ministry of Construction and Transportation signed an agreement with the Korea Institute of Machinery and Materials for a maglev train. On January 31, 2007, the Korea Institute of Machinery and Materials Urban Maglev Train Commercialization Project Group was launched. On June 26 of the same year, the construction of a demonstration line in Incheon Metropolitan City was decided. In December 2009, Hyundai Rotem completed the production of a test train. In July 2013, the name of the vehicle was officially decided as Ecobee. On February 3, 2016, the Incheon Airport Maglev using Ecobee as a demonstration line opened.

== Technology ==
It was developed by Hyundai Rotem and the Korea Institute of Machinery and Materials using South Korean technology. It is powered by the power of the electromagnet and moves by floating 8 mm above the track. Since it is powered by electromagnetic force without wheels, there is almost no noise, vibration, or dust due to friction when running. It can accommodate up to 230 people per train. The designed maximum speed is 110km/h.
