= Incheon Airport Maglev =

Maglev in Incheon, South Korea

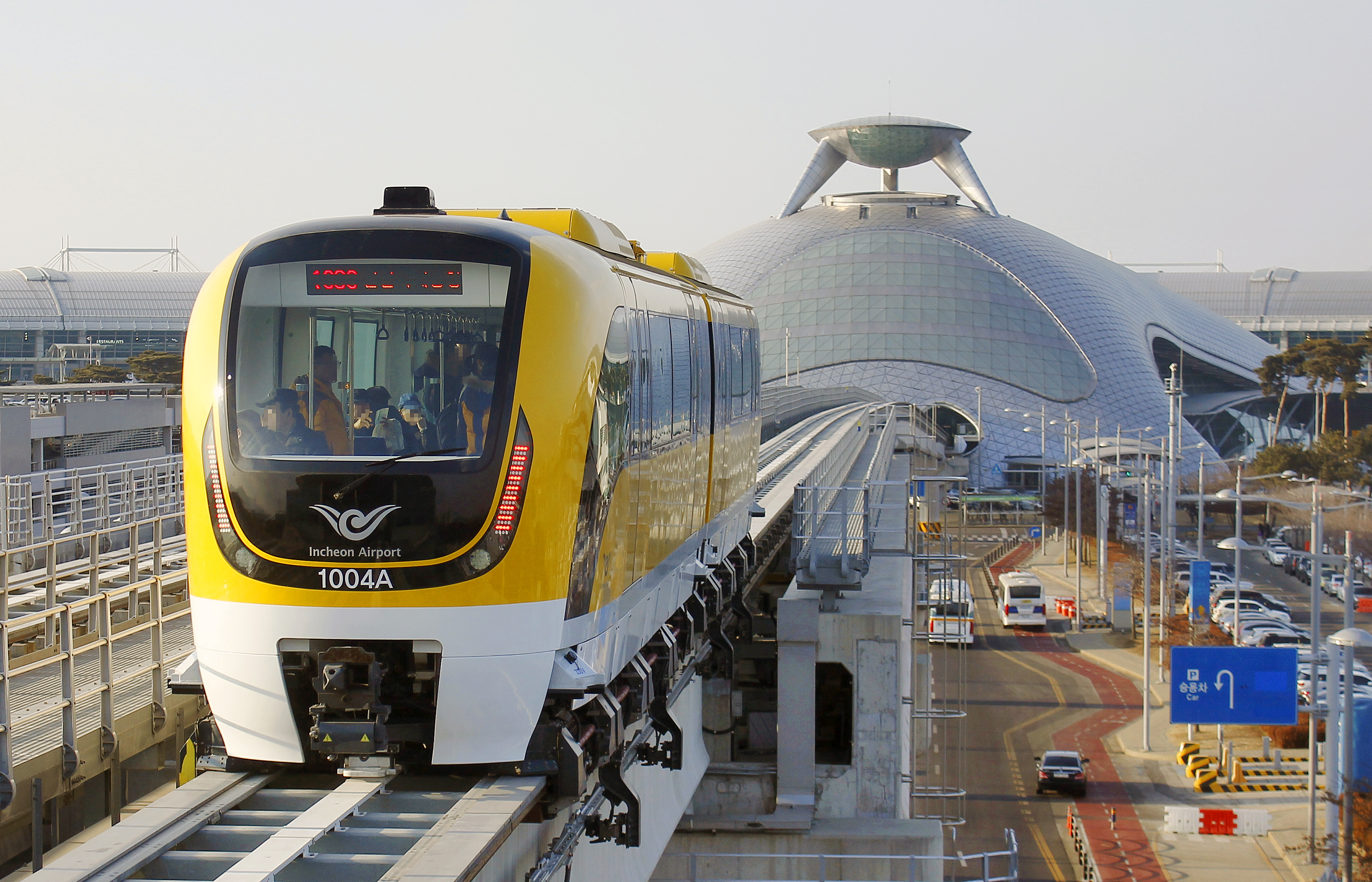
- ECOBEE

Overview
- Status: Operational
- Termini: Incheon International Airport Terminal 1; Yongyu
- Stations: 6

Service
- Type: Maglev
- Operator(s): Incheon Transit Corporation, Incheon International Airport Corporation
- Rolling stock: 4 × 2-car Hyundai Rotem ECOBEE

History
- Opened: 3 February 2016
- Closed: 14 July 2022
- Reopened: 17 October 2025

Technical
- Line length: 6.1 km (3.8 mi)
- Num of tracks: 2
- Track gauge: 1,850 mm (6 ft 27/32 in)
- Electrification: 1,500 V DC third rail linear motor
- Operating speed: 40 km/h (25 mph)
- Signalling: ATC/ATO
- Highest elevation: 24.5 m (80 ft)

Korean name
- Hangul: 인천공항 자기부상철도
- Hanja: 仁川空港磁氣浮上鐵道
- RR: Incheon gonghang jagi busang cheoldo
- MR: Inch'ŏn konghang chagi pusang ch'ŏlto
Route map

The Incheon Airport Maglev is a maglev line in South Korea that opened on 3 February 2016. It was the world's second commercially operating unmanned urban maglev line after Japan's Linimo. The trains were lighter, cutting construction costs in half. The majority of construction was completed by November 2012. Operations were temporarily suspended from 14 July 2022, and the line reopened on 17 October 2025.

The maglev links Incheon International Airport Terminal 1 to Long Term Parking, Incheon Airport Administration Complex, Paradise City entertainment precinct, and Yongyu station and Leisure Complex while crossing the island of Yeongjongdo. The line is not part of the Seoul Metropolitan Subway System. It is free of charge for all riders. It initially operated between 09:00 and 18:00, but was extended to run between 07:30 and 20:00. Departures were every 15 minutes from all stations. It offered a transfer to Incheon International Airport Terminal 1 station of AREX.

Effective 17 October 2025, the line operates between 10:00 and 17:00 with 35 minute intervals, and does not operate on Mondays.

The line utilizes electromagnetic suspension (EMS) and linear induction motor (LIM) propulsion. The train is one of the first commercial maglev trains since the 1980s. Two more stages were planned of 9.7 km (6.0 mi) and 37.4 km (23.2 mi), which would have made it a circular line. These lines made up a core project that the Korea Rail Network Authority managed.

== Stations ==
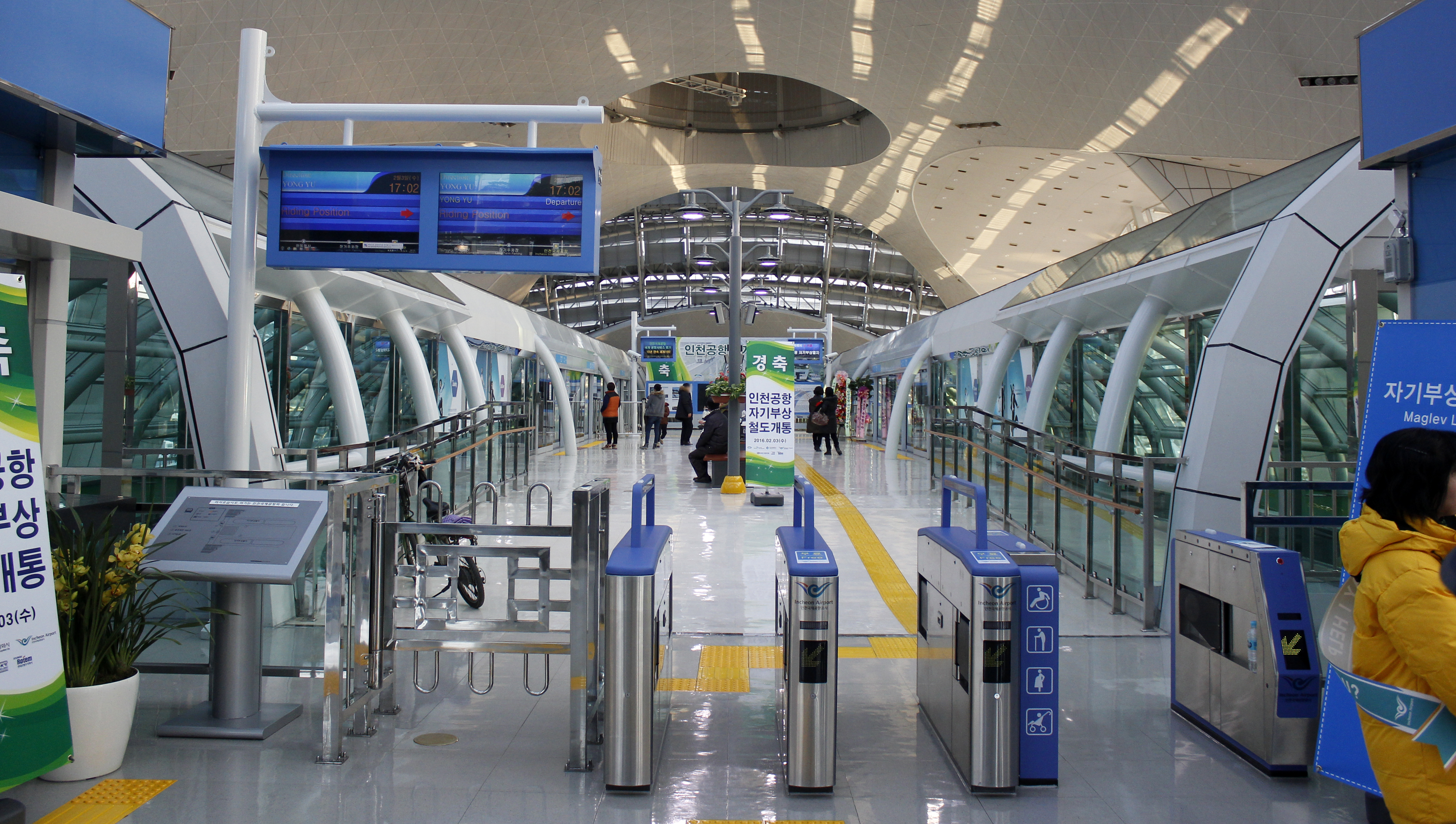
Maglev station platform in Incheon Airport

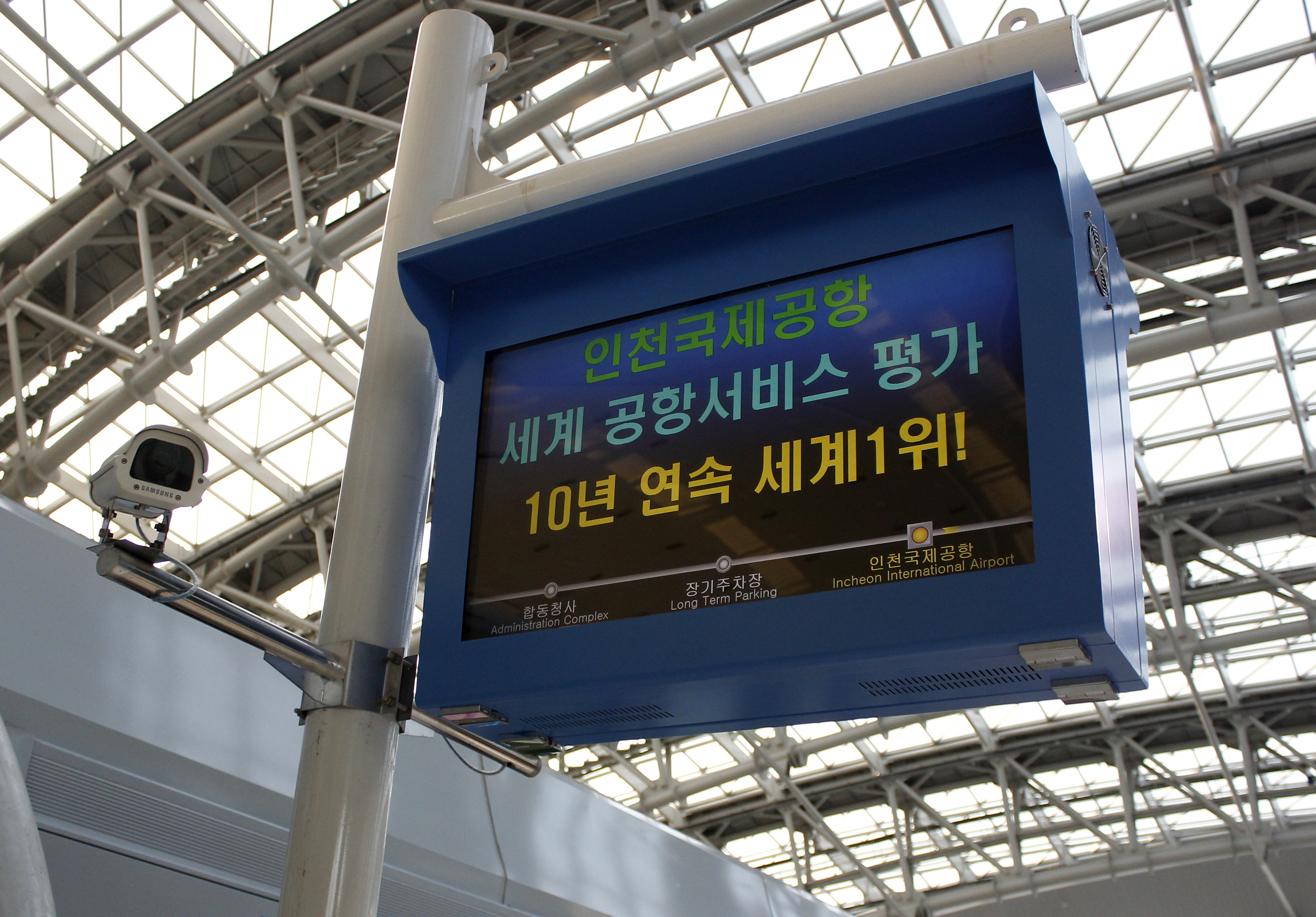
Incheon Airport maglev station train arrival screen

All stations are located in Jung District, Incheon.

Station number	Station name			Transfer	Distance (km)	
Station number	English Name	Hangul	Hanja	Transfer	Station	Total
M01	Incheon International Airport Terminal 1	인천공항1터미널	仁川空港1터미널	AREX	0	
M02	Long Term Parking	장기주차장	長期駐車場		0.4	
M03	Administration Complex	합동청사	合同廳舍		0.5	0.9
M04	Paradise City	파라다이스시티	파라다이스시티		0.4	1.3
M05	Water Park	워터파크	워터파크		3	4.3
M06	Yongyu	용유	龍遊		1.2	5.5

== History ==
=== Origins ===
The maglev train, nicknamed ECOBEE, was co-developed by the Korea Institute of Machinery and Materials (known as the KIMM, which is part of the Korea University of Science and Technology) and Hyundai Rotem. It is 6.1 kilometres (3.8 mi) long, with six stations and an 80 km/h (50 mph) operating speed (the design maximum speed is 110 km/h (68 mph)).

This train was part of South Korea's Urban Maglev Program (UMP) which started in December 2006. This program reached out to prominent companies and organizations for rail development, like KIMM and Hyundai. The UMP represents Korea's push for R&D in maglev systems in order to engender a magnetic levitation transportation system to replace Korea's current urban transportation means. This train system is the result of a development project started in 1989 within the Korea Institute of Machinery and Materials (KIMM).

The Ministry of Land, Infrastructure and Transport contributed 59% of the funds, around ₩217.4 billion (US$162.21 million), with Incheon Airport Corporation spending ₩78.7 billion (US$58.72 million) amounting to 25%, and Incheon paying ₩18.9 billion (US$14.1 million) which comes to 6%. Additionally, ₩100 billion (US$74.61 million) was spent on research. This totals over ₩415 billion (US$309.64 million) of taxpayer money spent on the short lived project. Service started on 3 February 2016.

=== Response to the COVID-19 pandemic ===
During the COVID pandemic the line was reduced to operate during rush hours only, departing Airport Terminal 1 Station every 15 minutes from 07:30 to 09:00 and 18:00–19:00. The reduced service was still operating in May 2022 but was expected to return to full-time service shortly after.

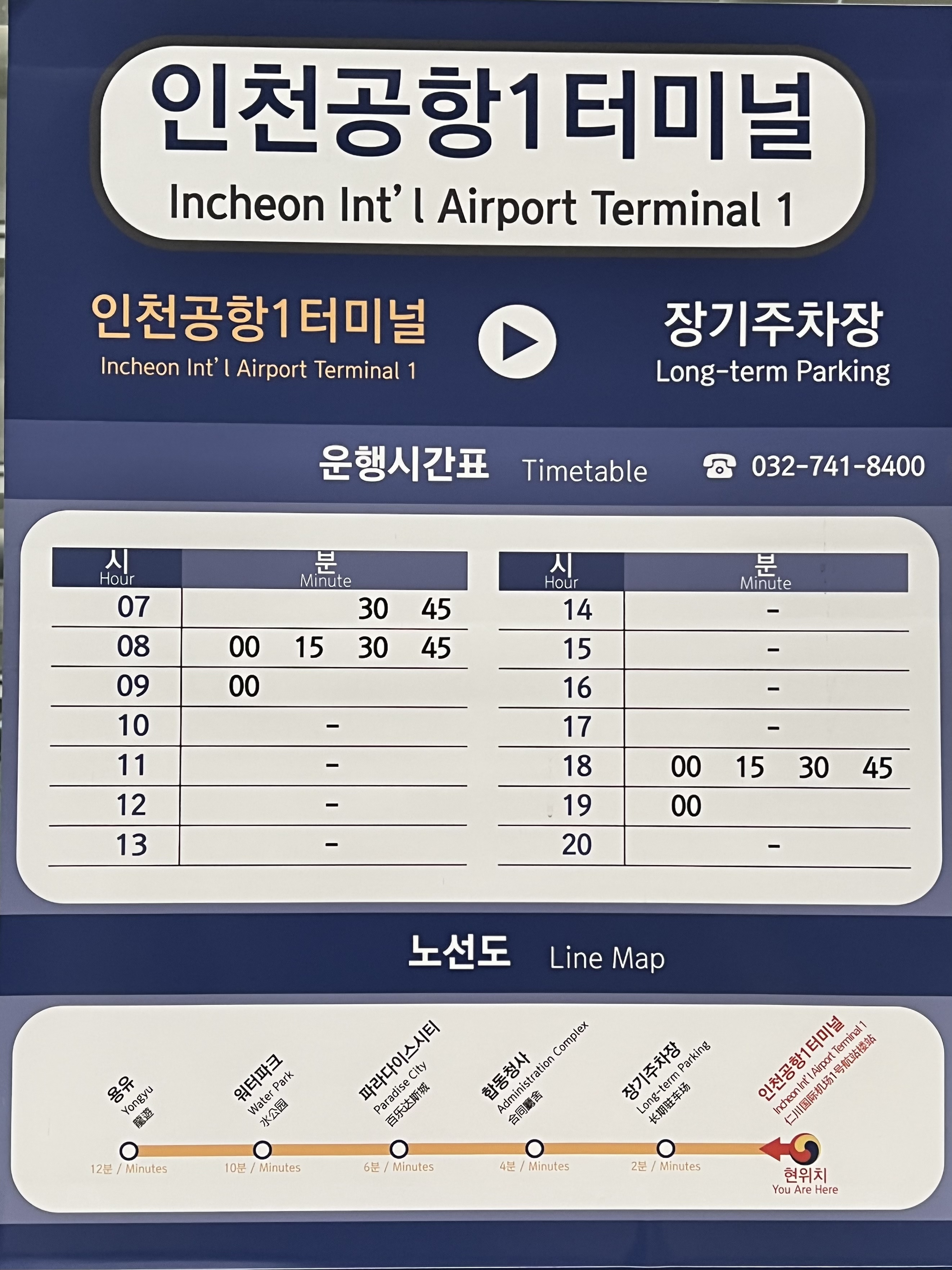
COVID-19 reduced service in May 2022

== Closure ==
At its height in 2019, the Incheon Maglev saw just 4,000 passengers each day. This is only 11% of expected usage levels. During the coronavirus pandemic, this number reduced by over 90% to just 300 daily passengers on average.

The line was temporarily closed from 14 July 2022 due to maintenance and repair of the carriages not being completed on time (required every 3 years) as per the Railroad Safety Act.

At the National Assembly Land, Infrastructure and Transport Committee meeting on 22 August 2022, Rep. Heo Jong-sik of Dong District, Incheon called for a "plan to reduce operating costs", as annual maintenance fees hit ₩6 billion (US$4.48 million).

On 17 October 2022, the National Assembly Transportation Committee held an inspection of the Incheon International Airport Corporation. It was revealed that Incheon Maglev required ₩500 billion (US$373.06 million) of investment over the next 10 years, more than the cost of its initial construction.

On 16 June 2023, the Construction and Transportation Committee of Incheon City Council approved plans to convert the track from Maglev to orbital tram tracks. The City Council argued that maintenance costs could be reduced by up to 35% due to the difficulty and high cost in purchasing parts for Maglev trains.

== Changes and reopening ==
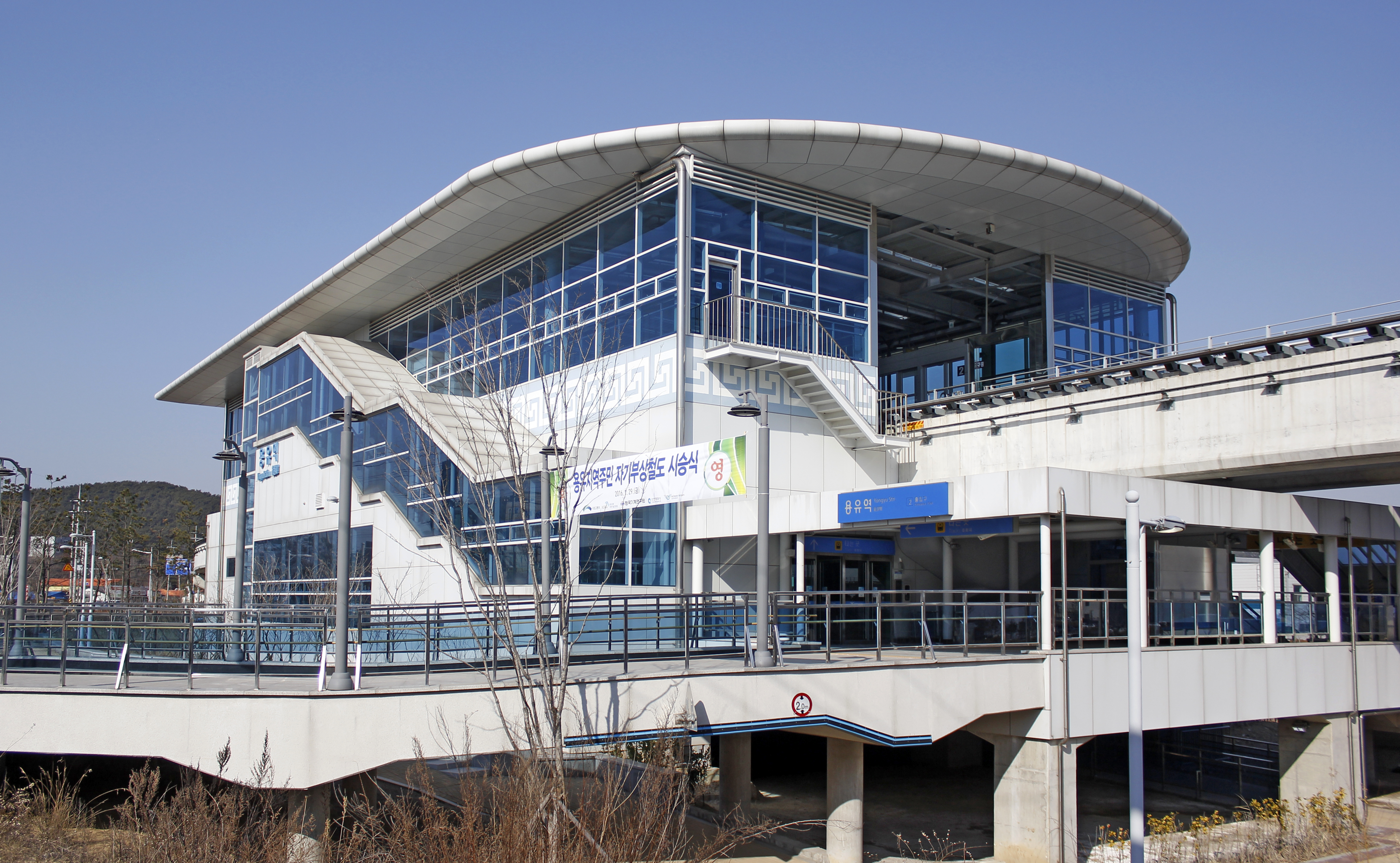
Maglev station in Yongyu

A proposal to cut costs was passed at the Incheon City Planning Committee on 26 July 2023. The new plan would reduce the operating time from 13 hours to 6 hours and decrease the number of trains from 103 to 25. It was projected that these changes would cut down annual operating costs from ₩8.2 billion (US$6.12 million) to ₩5.3 billion (US$3.95 million).

On 3 January 2024, Incheon International Airport Corporation announced that operations are expected to resume from March 2024. By May 2024, the Maglev had not reopened, though there were plans to reopen it by the end of the year. Due to disagreements with the Jung District office, the Maglev was still closed in 2025.

On 17 October 2025, the line resumed service after 3 years and 3 months of suspension, and will now serve as a tourism and experiential facility rather than a public transportation service to reduce operational costs.

== Rolling stock ==
Hyundai Rotem both developed and manufactured the rolling stock for the line. The 4 trains consist of 2 carriages, namely A and B. Each carriage is 6 metres (19 ft 8 in) long, 2.7 metres (8 ft 10 in) wide and 3.45 metres (11 ft 4 in) high, they weigh 19 tonnes (19 long tons; 21 short tons) and have a starting acceleration and service brake of 1.1 m/s^{2} (3.6 ft/s^{2}).
