= Unseo-dong =

- Neighbourhood
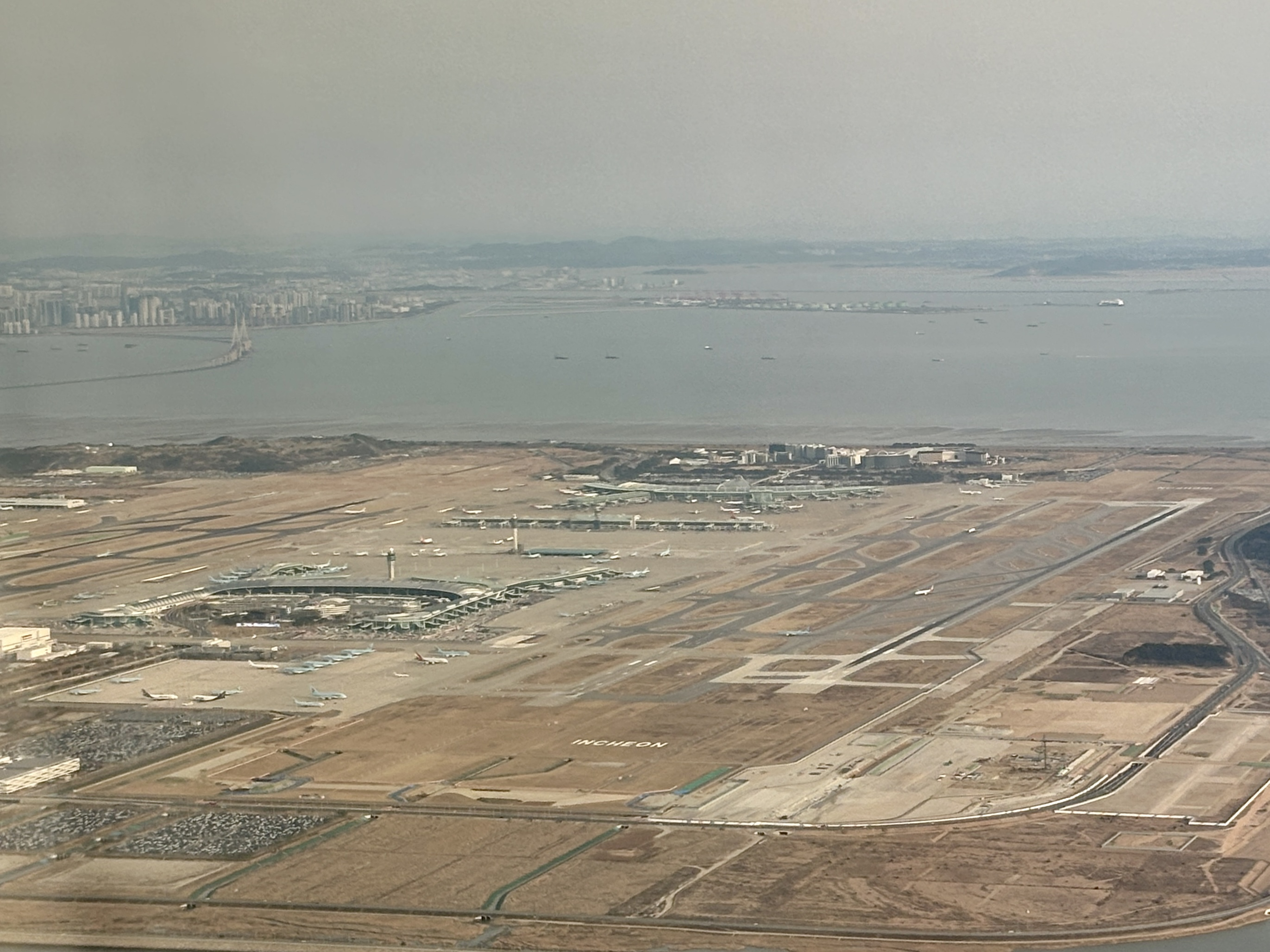

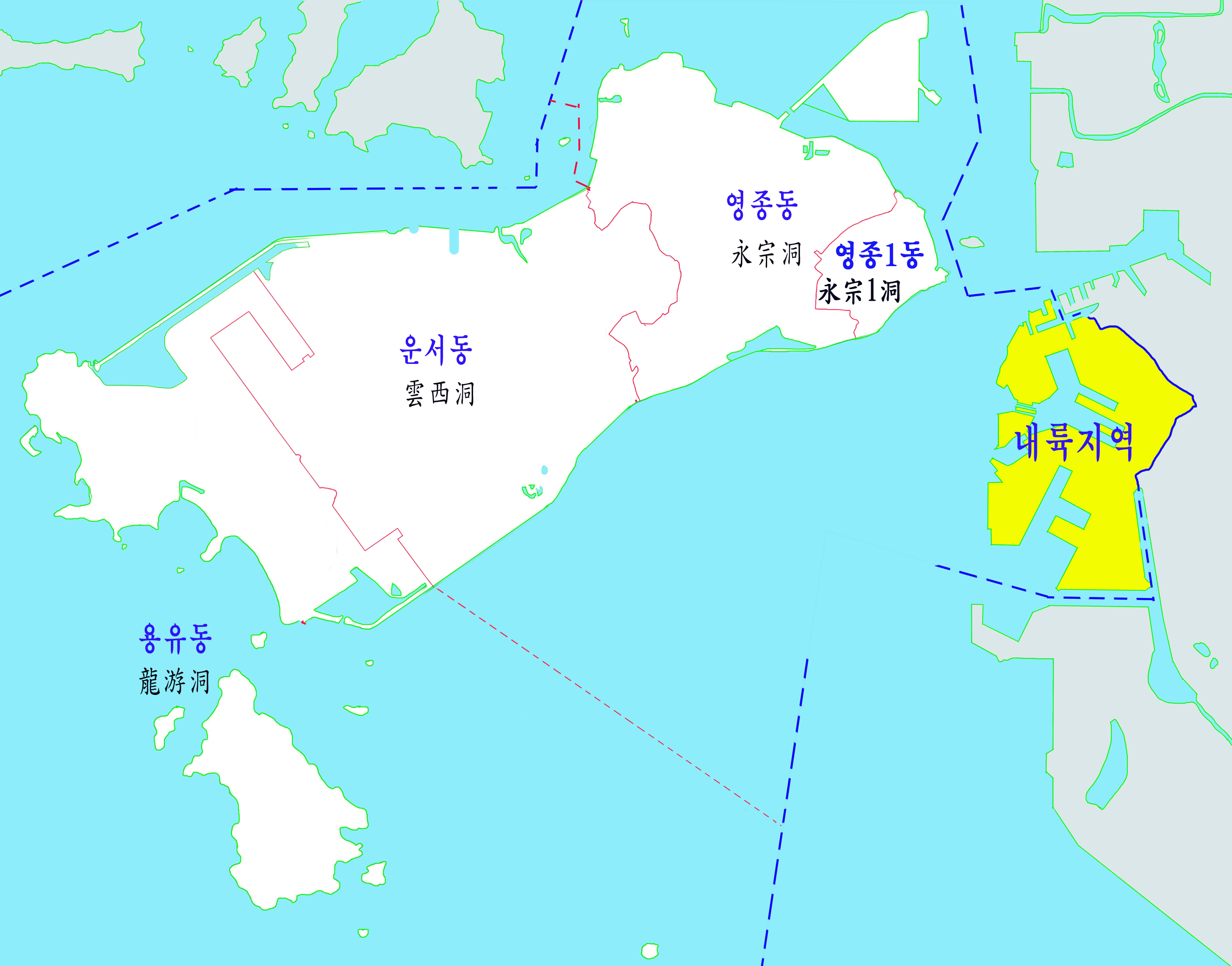
- Country: South Korea
- Region: Sudogwon
- Provincial level: Incheon

Area
  - Total: 51.56 km^{2} (19.91 sq mi)

Population (December 31, 2019)
  - Total: 15,597
  - Density: 302.5/km^{2} (783.5/sq mi)
  - Dialect: Seoul

Korean name
- Hangul: 운서동
- Hanja: 雲西洞
- RR: Unseo-dong
- MR: Unsŏ-dong

Unseo-dong (Korean: 운서동) is a neighbourhood in Jung District, Incheon, South Korea. The name Unseo was adopted in 1914 when the administrative district was consolidated.

Unseo-dong is the main point of air transportation with Incheon International Airport, which is the gateway to South Korea, and there are many floating populations going to and from the airport and other regions which is growing. However, due to rapid development, various problems such as environmental problems, rich and poor problems, and increased demand for welfare are occurring together.

Unseo-dong is the widest legal-status dong in South Korea, with an area of 51.56 km^{2}, and Incheon International Airport occupies most of the area, and this is larger than Anyang City (58.46 km^{2} (22.57 sq mi)) and Gyeryong City (60.7 km^{2} (23.4 sq mi)).

== Transportation ==
- Incheon International Airport
- AREX
  - Unseo station-Incheon International Airport Cargo Terminal station-Incheon International Airport Terminal 1 station-Yongyu station
- Incheon Airport Maglev
