= Yongyu station =

Metro station in Incheon, South Korea

Coordinates: 37.4247°N 126.4237°E

M06 용유 Yongyu
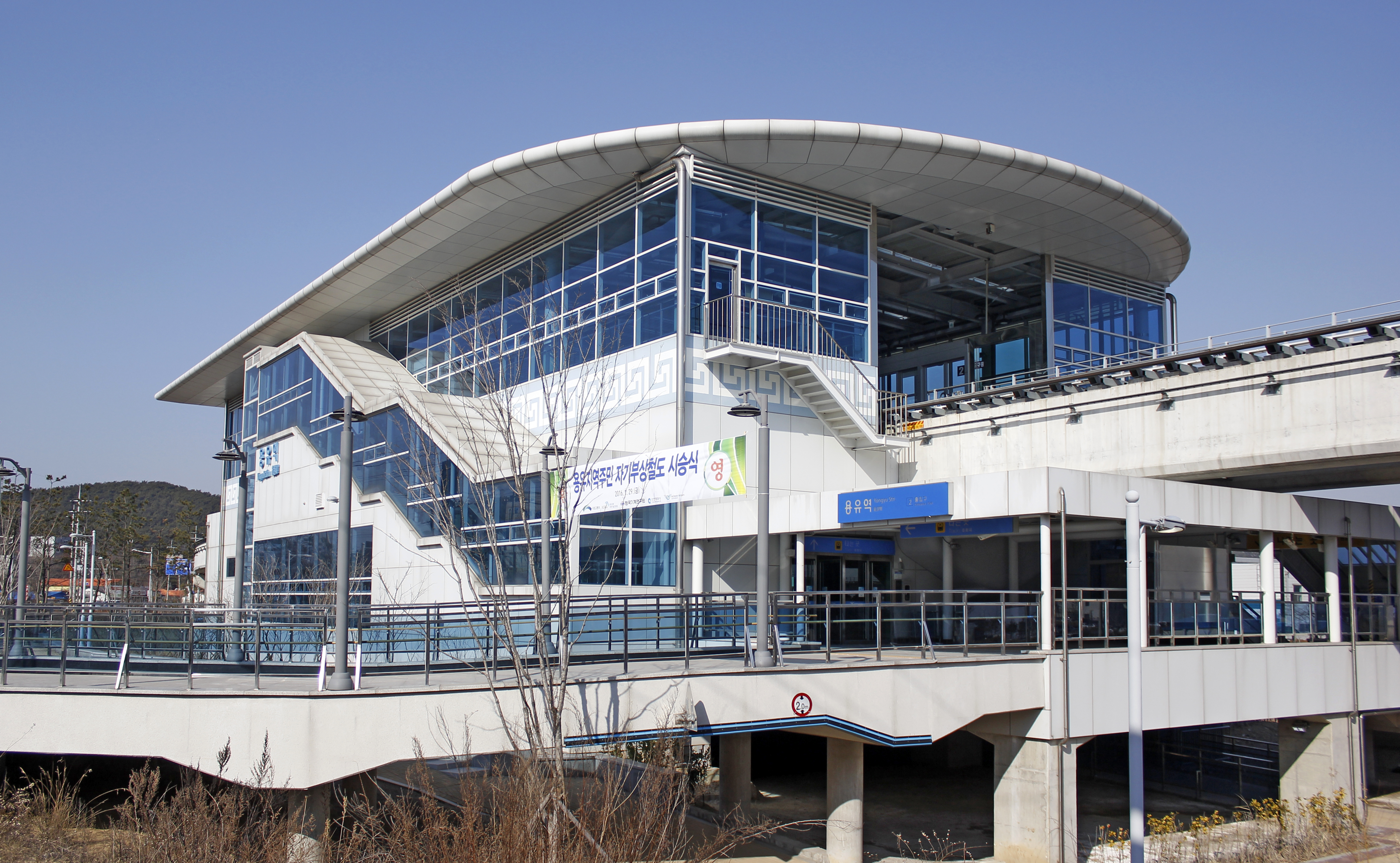

Korean name
- Hangul: 용유역
- Hanja: 龍遊驛
- Revised Romanization: Yongyu yeok
- McCune–Reischauer: Yongyu yŏk

General information
- Location: Unseo-dong, Jung District, Incheon
- Operator: Incheon International Airport Corporation
- Line: Incheon Airport Maglev
- Platforms: 3
- Tracks: 3

History
- Opened: February 3, 2016

Services
Preceding station	Incheon Transit Corporation	Following station
Water Park towards Incheon Int'l Airport Terminal 1	Incheon Airport Maglev	Terminus
Location

Yongyu station (Korean: 용유역; Hanja: 龍遊驛) is a station of the Incheon Airport Maglev in Unseo-dong, Jung District, Incheon, South Korea.
