= Incheon International Airport Terminal 1 station =

Metro station in Incheon, South Korea

Coordinates: 37.44745°N 126.45253°E

인천공항1터미널; Incheon Int'l Airport Terminal 1
M01
인천공항1터미널
Incheon Int'l Airport Terminal 1
- Incheon International Airport Terminal 1 station outside view

Korean name
- Hangul: 인천공항1터미널역
- Hanja: 仁川空港1터미널驛
- Revised Romanization: Incheongonghangilteomineollyeok
- McCune–Reischauer: Inch'ŏn'gonghangilt'ŏminŏllyŏk

General information
- Location: 2851 Unseo-dong, 271 Gonghangno, Yeongjong-gu, Incheon
- Operator: Airport Railroad Co., Ltd. Incheon Transit Corporation
- Lines: AREX; Incheon Airport Maglev
- Platforms: 4 (2 island platforms)
- Tracks: 4

History
- Former names: Incheon International Airport

Key dates
- March 23, 2007: AREX opened
- February 3, 2016: Incheon Airport Maglev opened
- March 28, 2018: KTX service suspended

Services
Preceding station	Seoul Metropolitan Subway	Following station
Incheon International Airport Cargo Terminal towards Seoul Station	AREX Local	Incheon Int'l Airport Terminal 2 Terminus
Seoul towards Seoul Station	AREX Express	Incheon Int'l Airport Terminal 2 Terminus
Preceding station	Incheon Transit Corporation	Following station
Terminus	Incheon Airport Maglev	Long Term Parking towards Yongyu
Location

Incheon International Airport Terminal 1 station is a railway station on AREX and the Incheon Airport Maglev. It is in Incheon International Airport's transport center near Terminal 1.

Both commuter ("All-stop") and express services stop at this station. While the express service directly heads to Seoul Station, the commuter service stops at all stations.

The Incheon Airport Maglev can also be accessed from the same building.

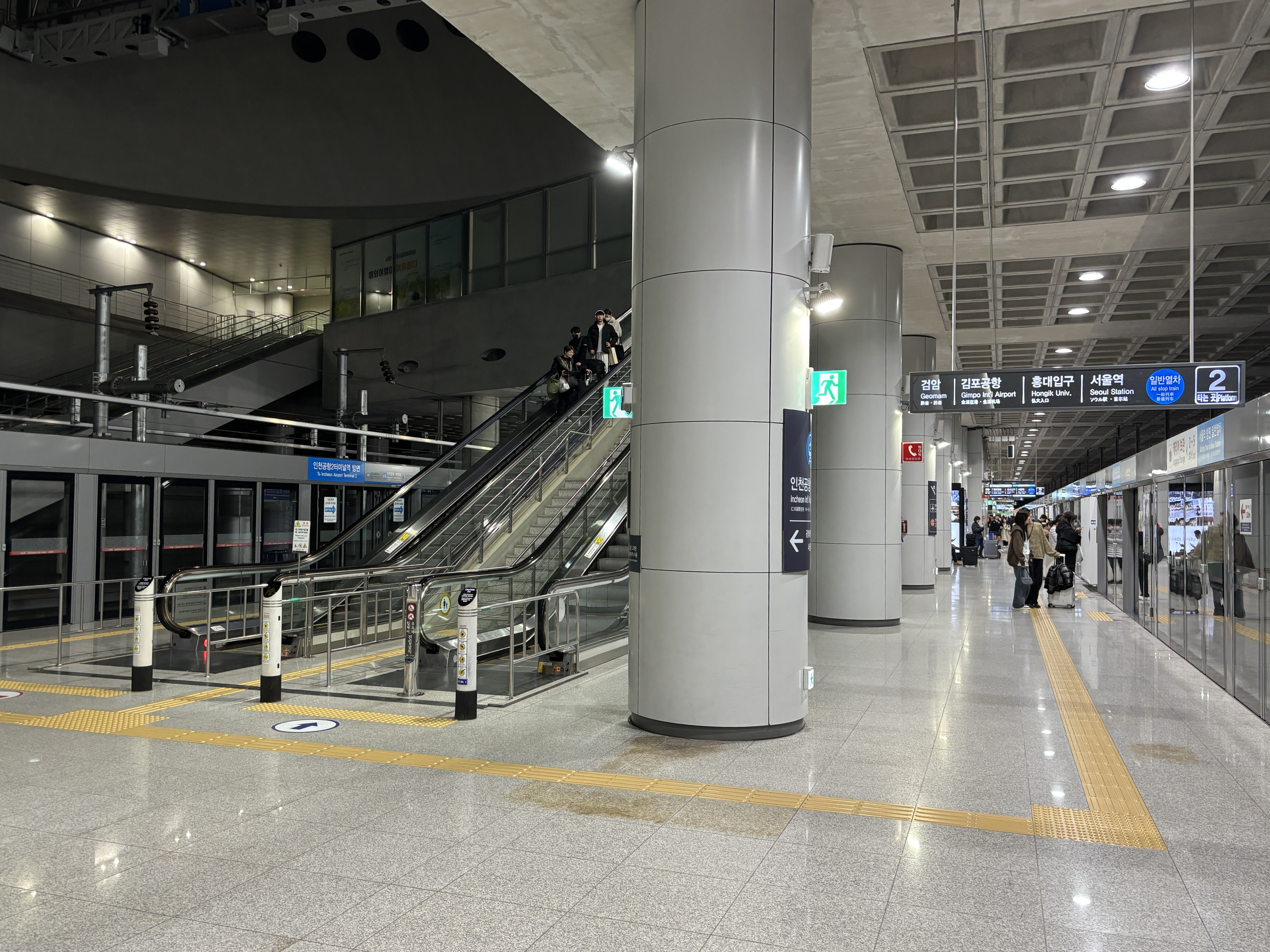
AREX platforms

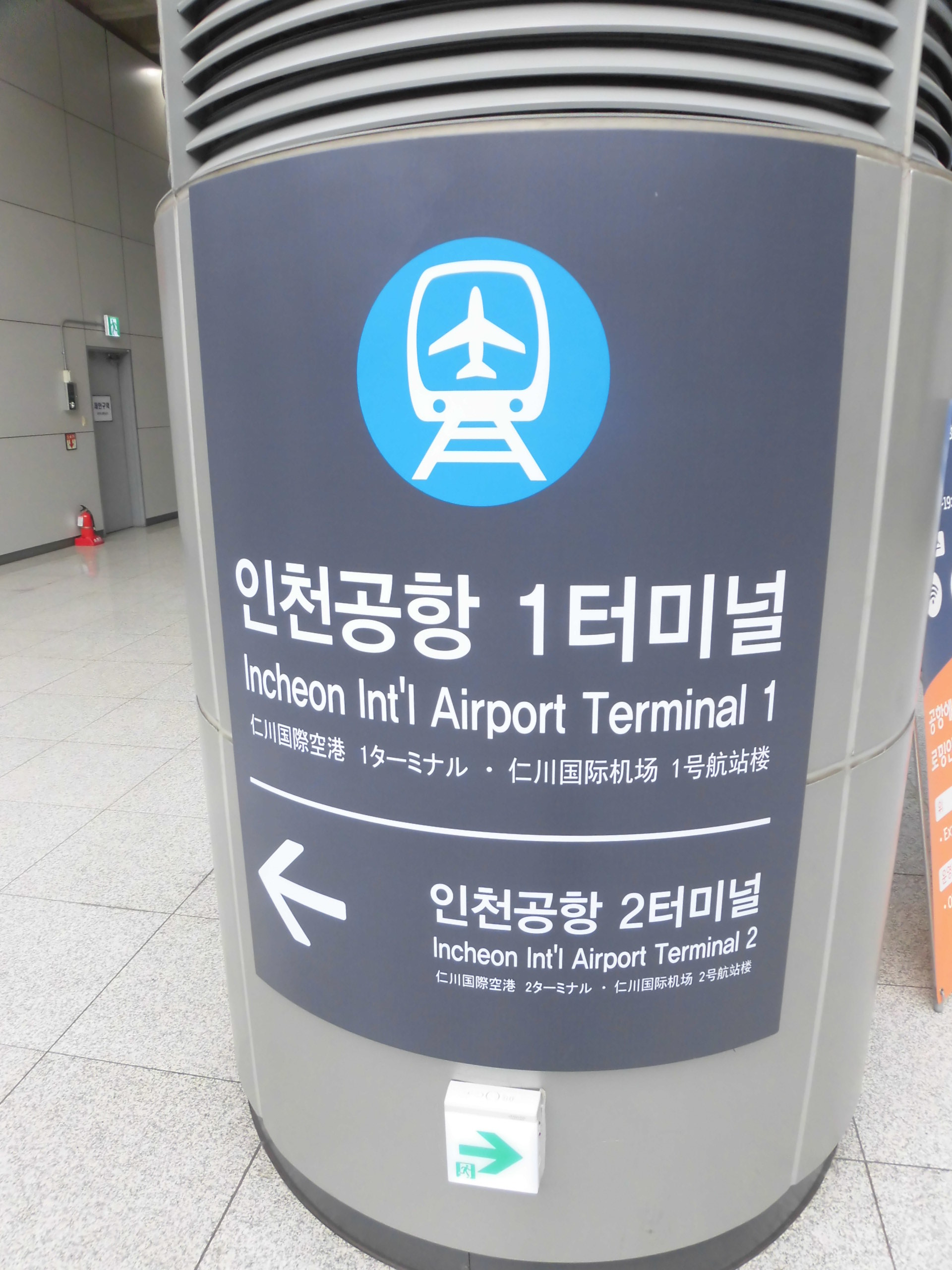
AREX station name sign

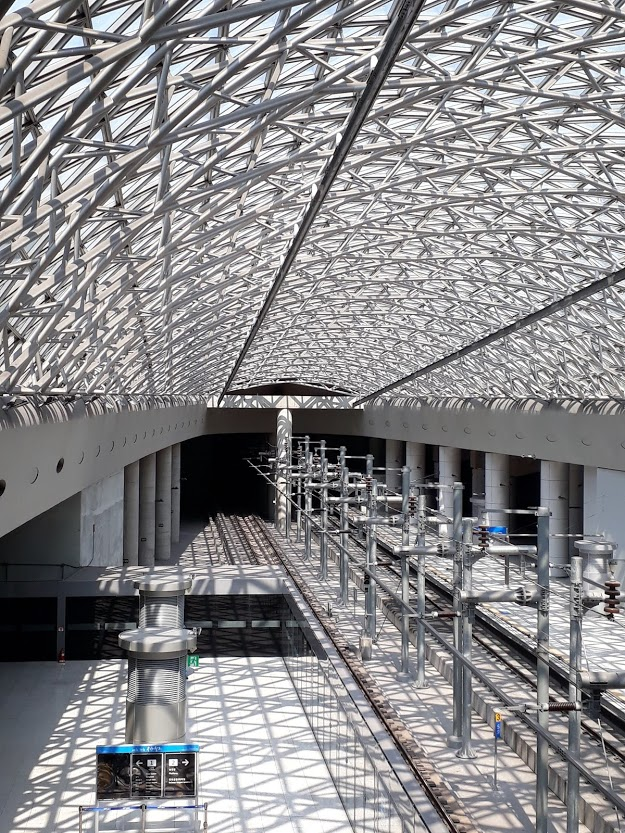
The platform's glass roof

== Former KTX Service ==
Since June 2014, KTX operated from this station with stops at Geomam station and Seoul Station towards Busan and Gwangju. Before the KTX opened services at this station, there was high-leveled platform which had no use. Since this time, only this platform didn't have platform screen doors because there was a plan for a 2nd airport railroad to go there, but this plan changed to KTX. After that, KTX started to run, they have changed the empty platform to a low leveled-platform to make KTX rideable. In the same year, KTX expanded service to Incheon Airport. Since 2018, KTX service to Incheon Airport has been suspended and the suspension became permanent in September 2018 as the line was officially abolished due to low demand and ridership.

Travelling to cities other than Seoul by rail is now only available through a transfer at Seoul Station or Gwangmyeong Station by AREX or bus. In 2019, the KTX service was temporally operative again with 3 daily services to Gwangju, because of the 2019 World Aquatics Championships. The service started on July 9, and finished on July 29.

== Fares ==
- Express service: 8,000 won/adult, 6,900 won/child (the original intended fare was 14,300 won but was reduced to encourage usage).
- Commuter Service: It depends on the station embarked, but from Seoul Station to Incheon International Airport Station it is 4,150 won as of October 2017.

== Station layout ==
G	Street Level
L1; Concourse	Lobby	Faregates, Ticketing Machines, Station Control
L2; Platforms	Side platform, doors will open on the left
L2; Platforms	Eastbound	AREX Local toward Incheon Int'l Airport Terminal 2 (Terminus) → AREX Express toward Incheon Int'l Airport Terminal 2 (Terminus) →
L2; Platforms	Westbound	← AREX Local toward Seoul (Incheon Int'l Airport Cargo Terminal) ← AREX Express toward Seoul (Terminus)
L2; Platforms	Side platform, doors will open on the left
L2; Platforms	Side platform, doors will open on the left
L2; Platforms	Eastbound	(Unused platform, formerly used for KTX)
L2; Platforms	Westbound	(Unused platform, formerly used for KTX)
L2; Platforms	Side platform, doors will open on the left

== Photos ==
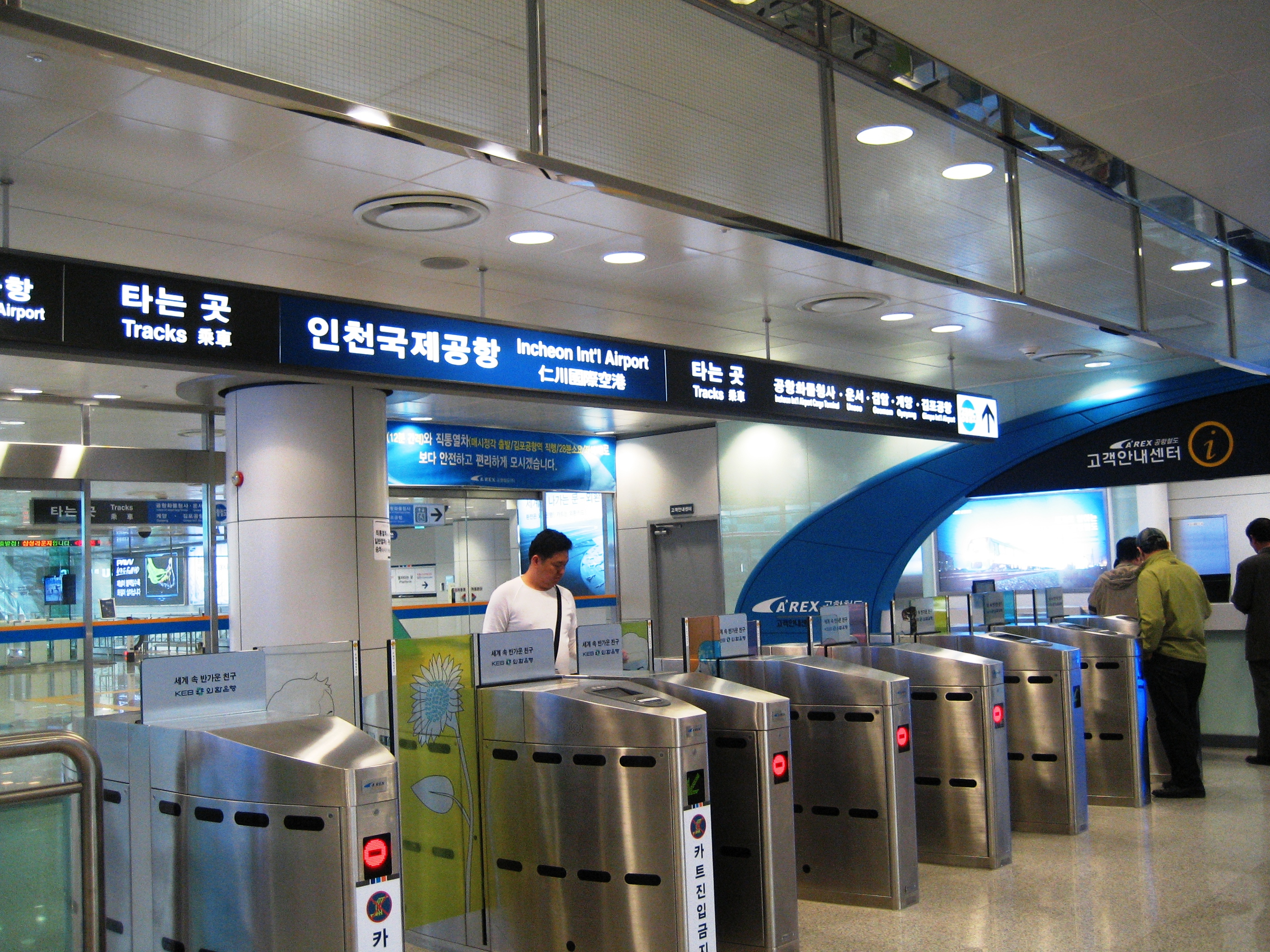
Station Entrance

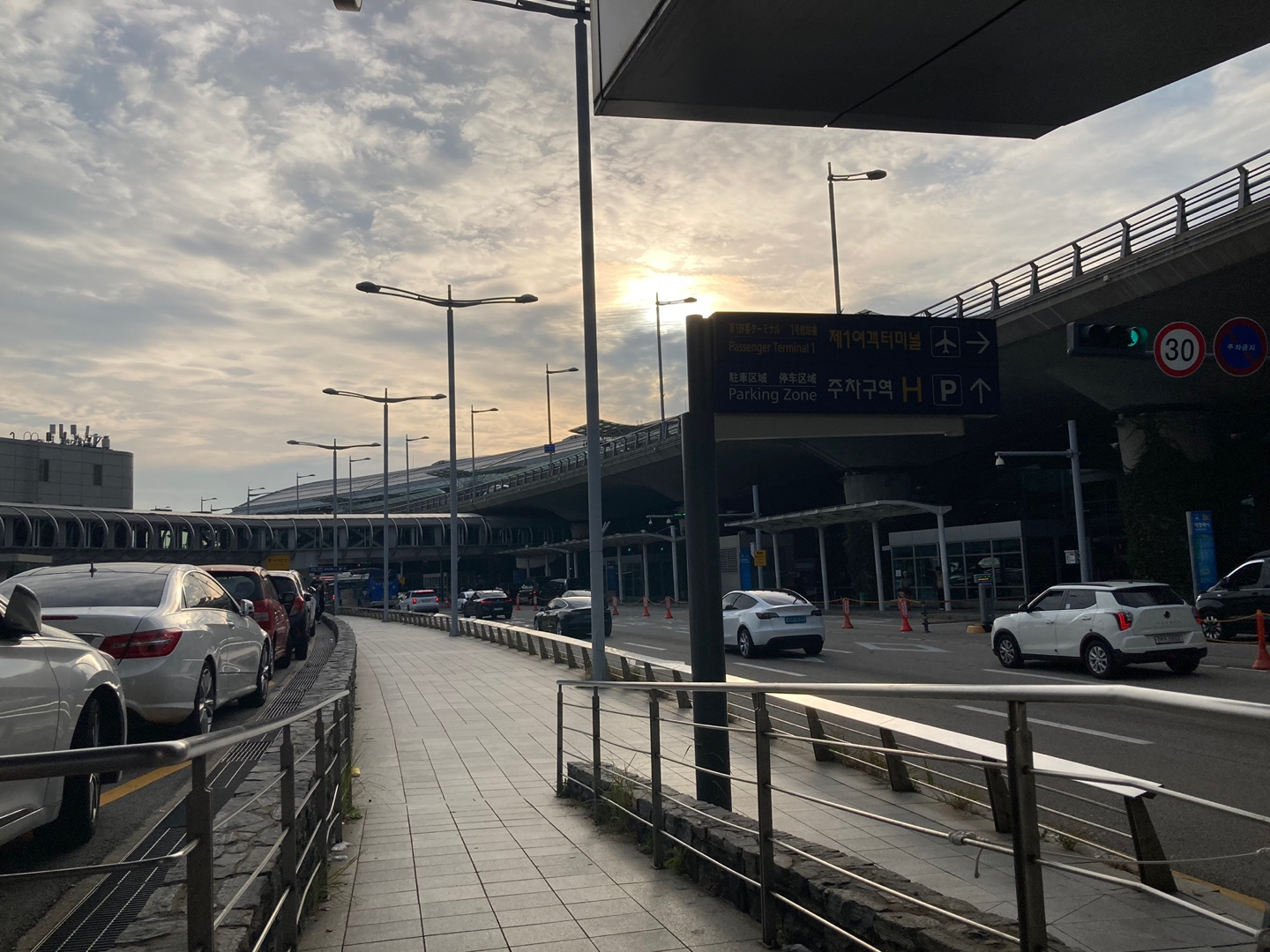
Incheon Air

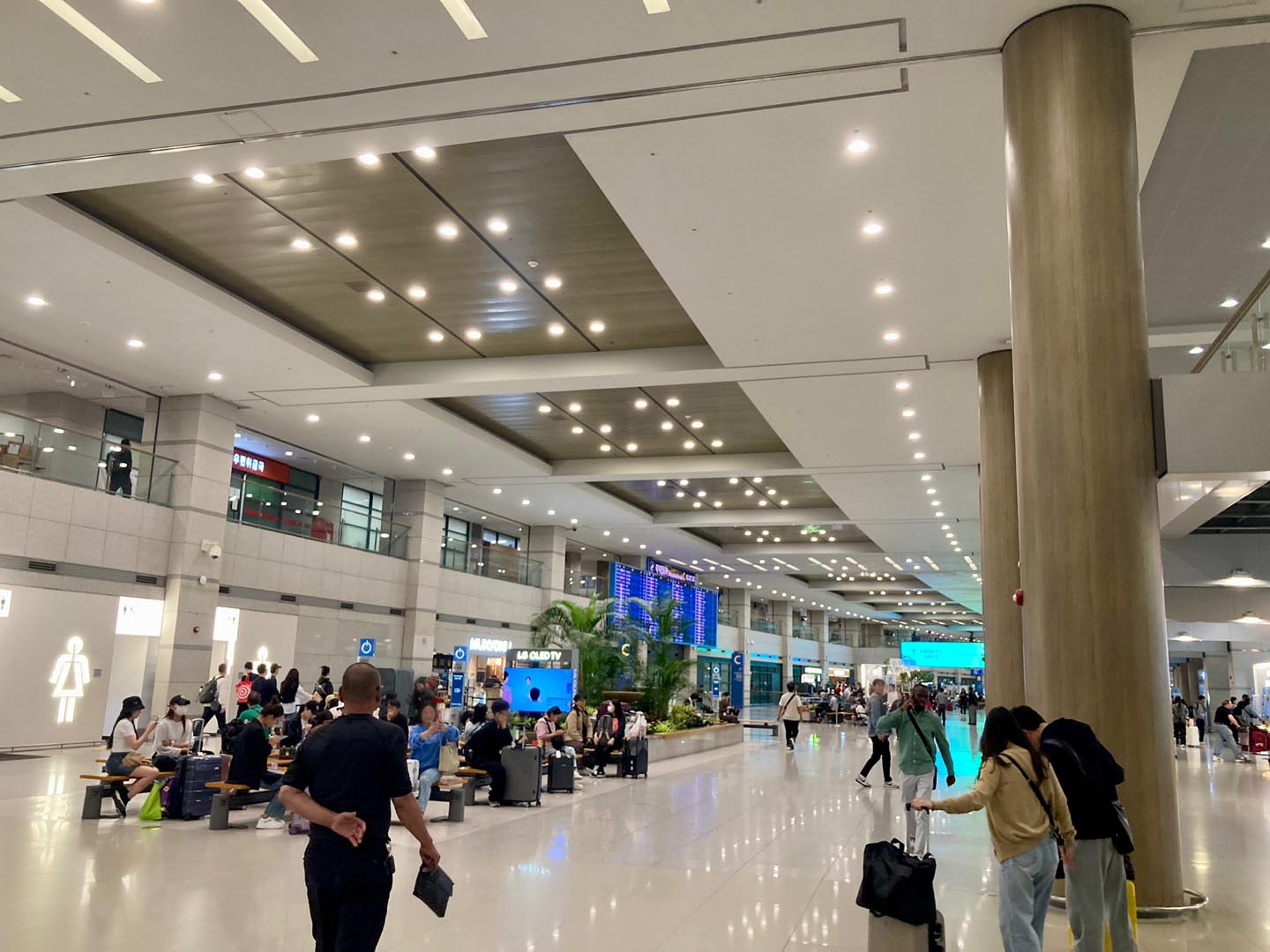
Incheon Air Terminal 1

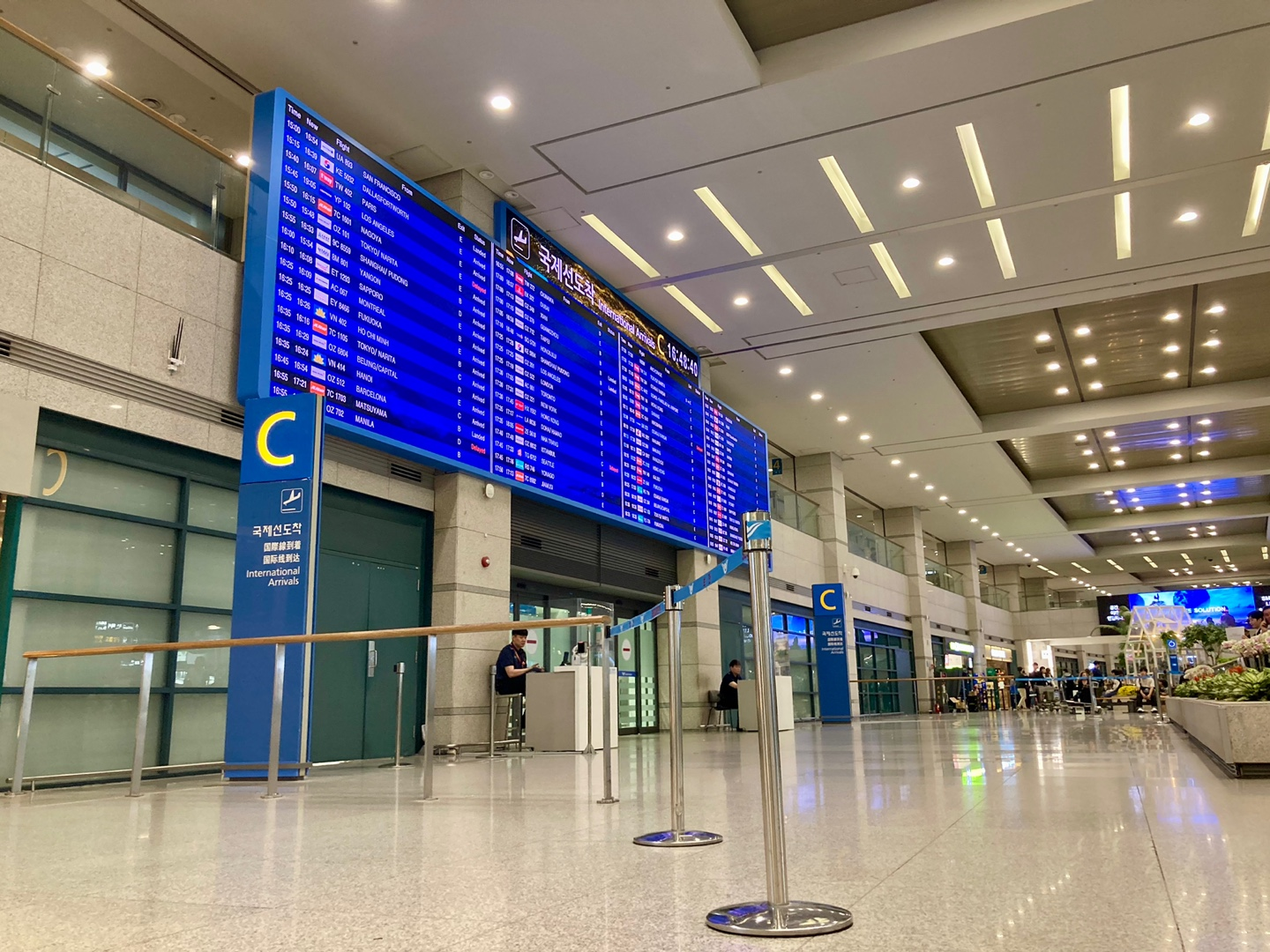
Arrivals

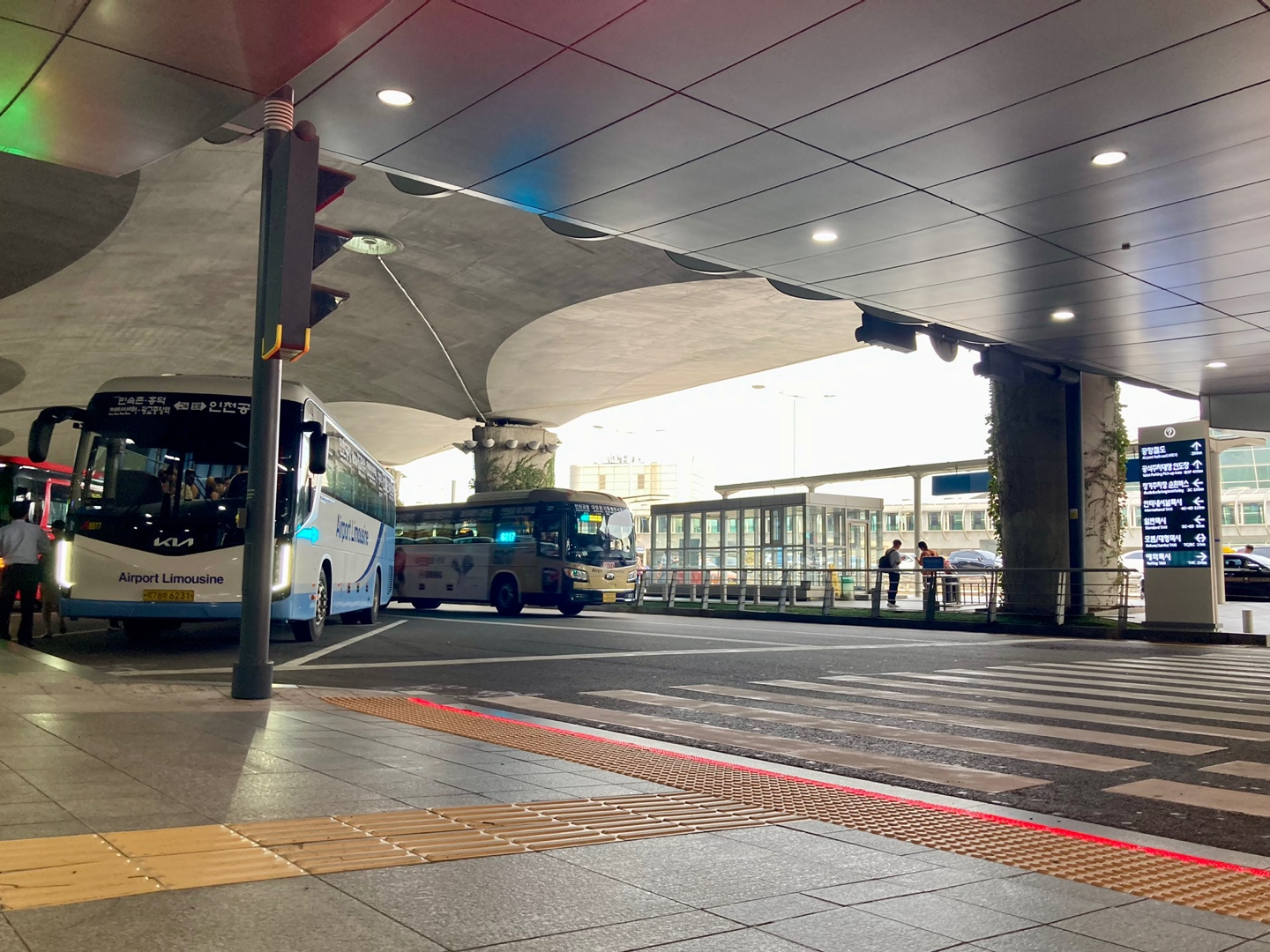
Bus Stops

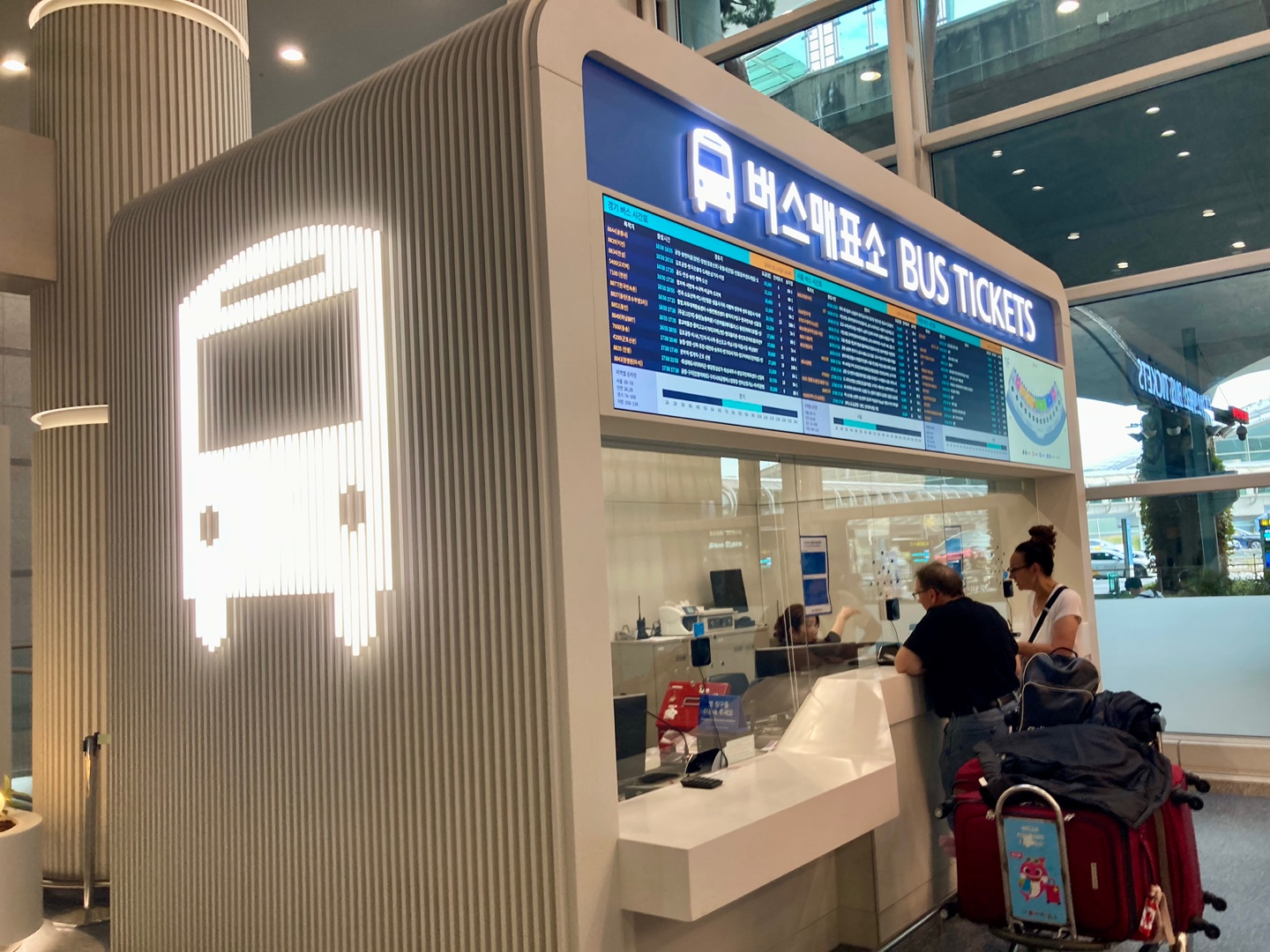
Bus Tickets

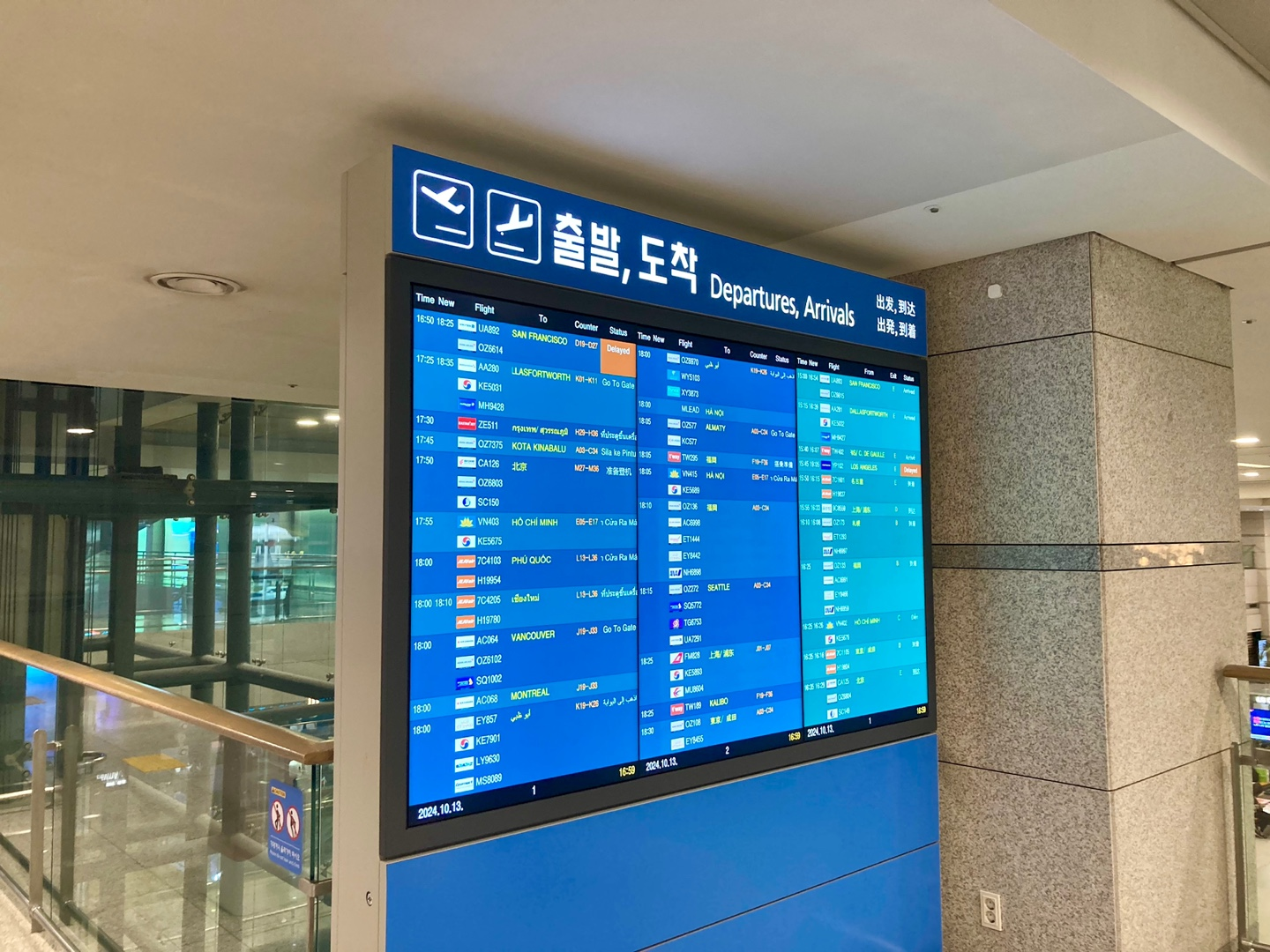
Terminal 1 Departures/Arrivals

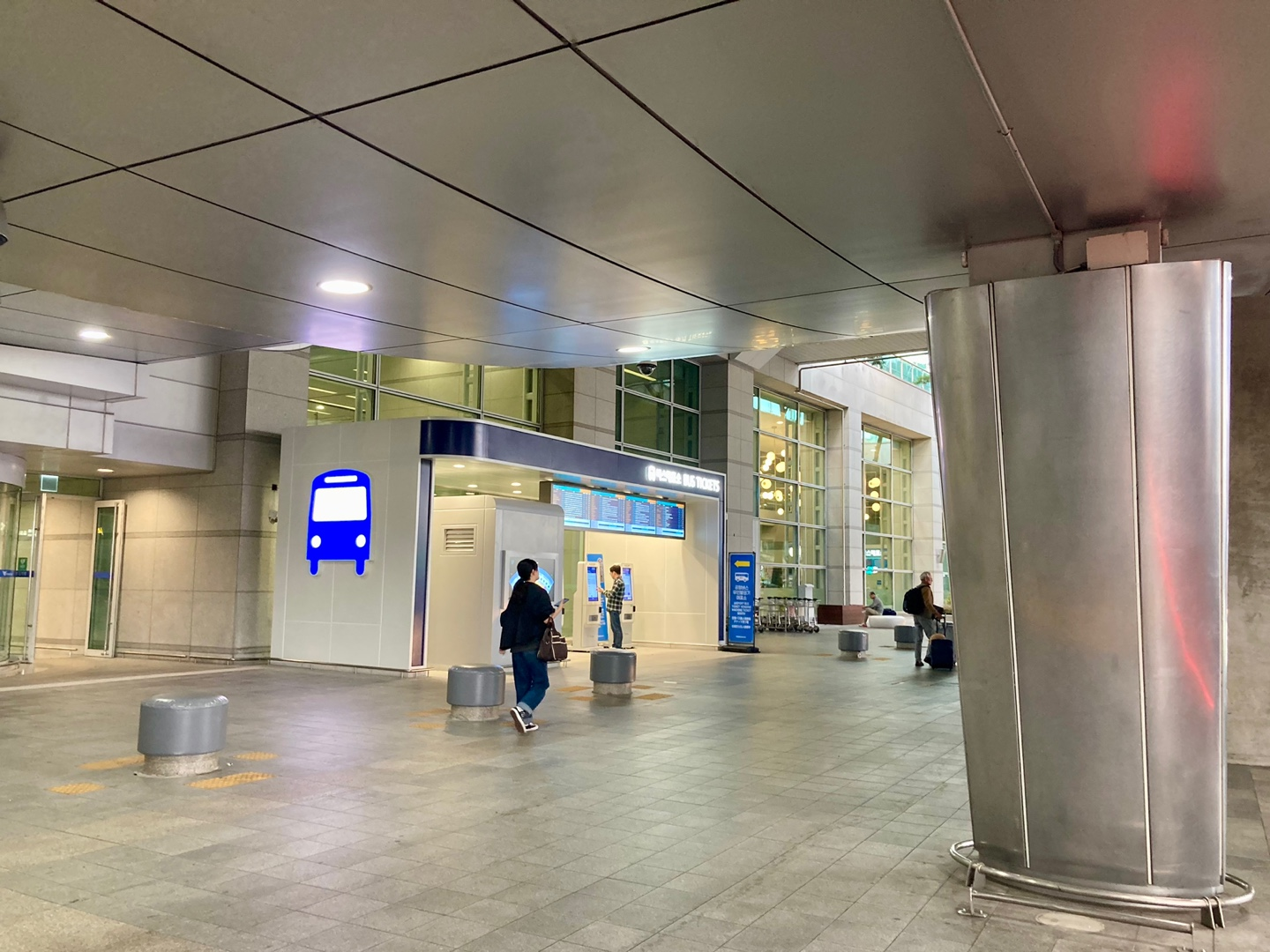
Bus Ticket Box

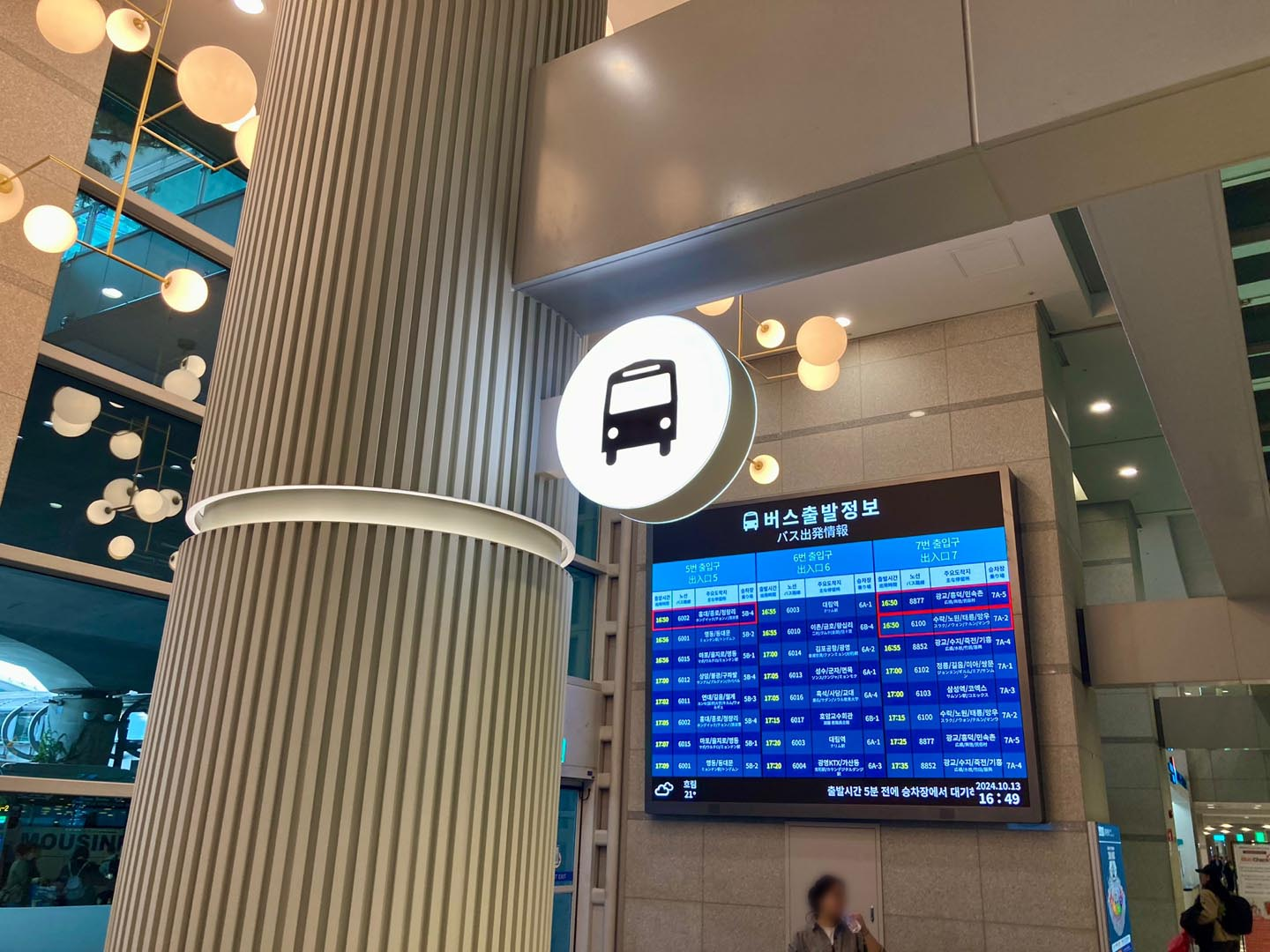
Bus Terminal

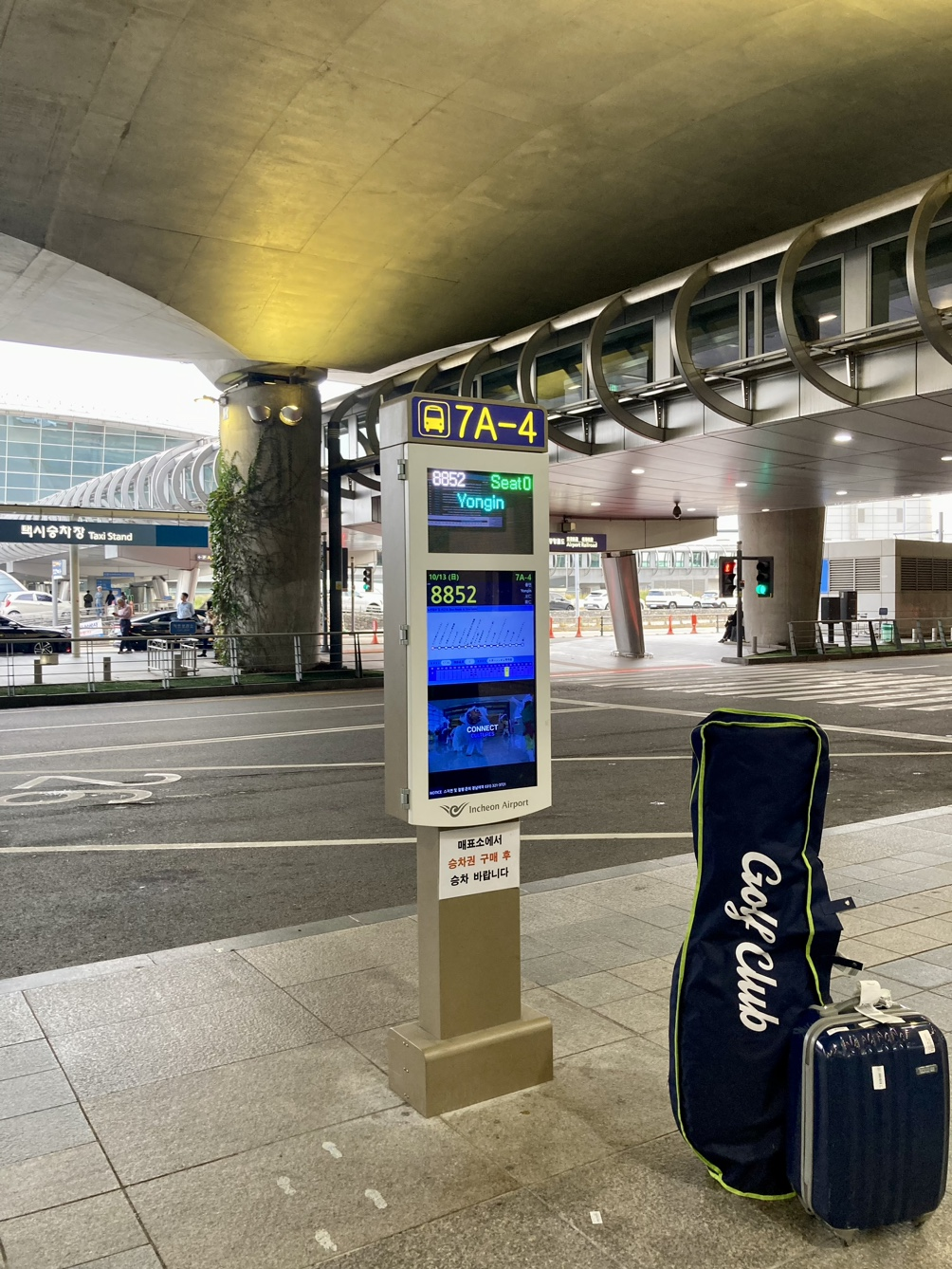
Bus Stops
