= 8000 class =

8000 class or Class 8000 may refer to:

- Korail Class 8000, electric locomotives
- PNR 8000 class, diesel multiple units
