= Tashkent–Bukhara high-speed rail line =

High-speed railway line in Uzbekistan

Afrosiyob
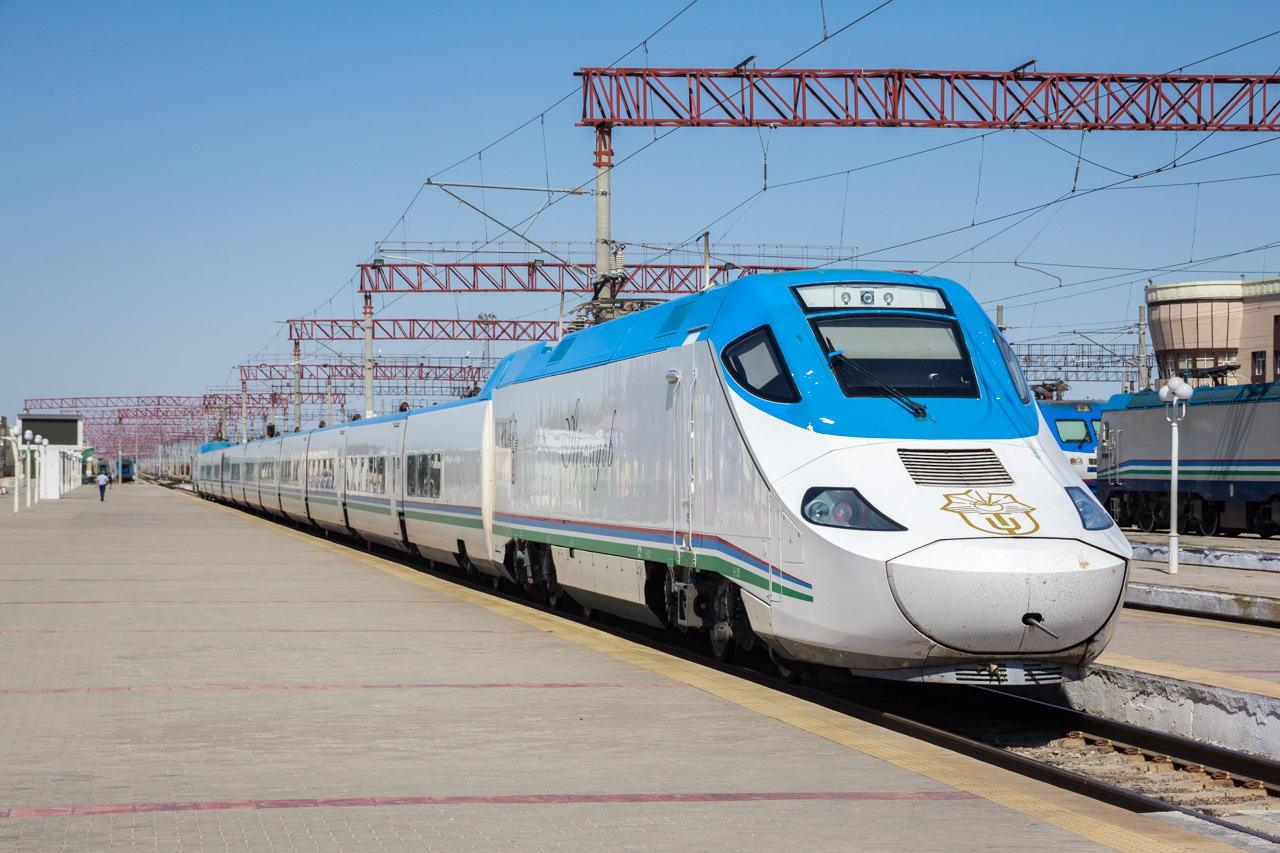

Overview
- Native name: Toshkent Samarqand tezyurar temir yo'li
- Status: Operational
- Locale: Uzbekistan
- Termini: Tashkent; Bukhara

Service
- Type: High-speed rail
- Services: 2
- Operator(s): Uzbek Railways
- Rolling stock: Talgo 250

History
- Commenced: 11 March 2011
- Opened: 8 October 2011; 14 years ago
- Last extension: 25 August 2016

Technical
- Line length: 600 km (370 mi)
- Track gauge: 1,520 mm (4 ft 11 27/32 in) Russian gauge
- Operating speed: 250 km/h (160 mph)

The Tashkent–Bukhara high-speed rail line is a 600-kilometre (373 mi) high-speed rail connection between Tashkent and Bukhara, two major cities in Uzbekistan. The route passes through six regions: Tashkent, Sirdaryo, Jizzakh, Samarqand, Navoiy, and Bukhara in Uzbekistan. Trains operate daily under the brand name Afrosiyob (named after Afrasiyab). The line originally ran from Tashkent to Samarqand, but an extension to Bukhara went into operation on 25 August 2016. Travel from Tashkent to Bukhara, a distance of 600 km (373 mi), now takes 3 hours and 20 minutes instead of 7 hours.

== History ==
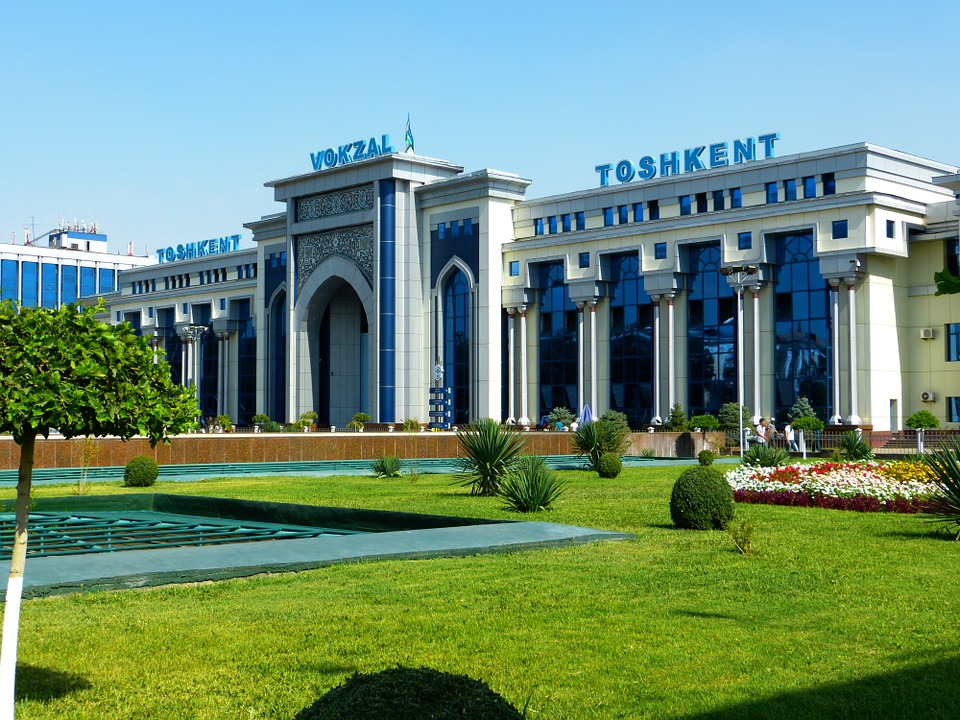
Tashkent Main Railway Station

Construction began on the line on 11 March 2011, with completion planned for later that year at a cost of approximately US$70 million. The line includes both new and rebuilt trackage, as well as modern signalling systems along the route. The 600 kilometres (370 mi) high-speed line is capable of speeds up to 250 km/h (160 mph), with a total travel time between Tashkent and Bukhara of just under four hours. The line was planned was opened for commercial operation in September 2011, but suffered from delays.

== Operation ==
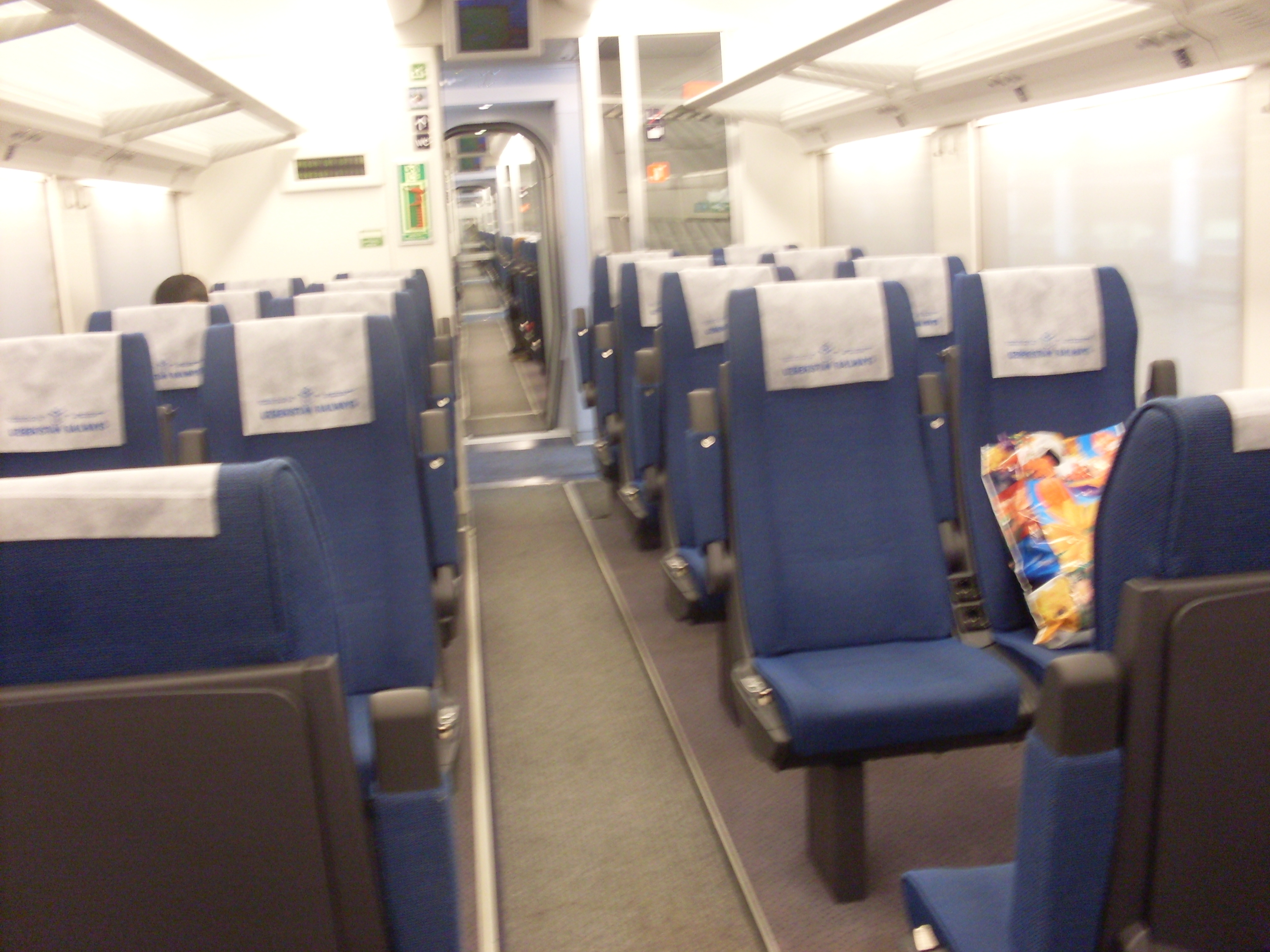
Inside Afrosiyob train

Two trainsets for operation on the line were ordered in November 2009 from Talgo at a cost of €38 million The cost of the purchase was split between operator O'zbekiston Temir Yo'llari and a loan from the state Fund for Reconstruction and Development of Uzbekistan. The first trainset, a Talgo 250, was delivered to Tashkent on 22 July 2011. Each trainset consists of two power cars, eight passenger cars with a capacity of 257 people and a dining car. The second trainset arrived in Tashkent on 9 December 2011. The train carried out its first trip from Tashkent to Samarkand on 26 August 2011.

Two more Talgo 250 trainsets were constructed for Afrosiyob services in 2017.

Commercial service started on 8 October 2011 twice a week under the brand Afrosiyob in honor of the ancient settlement of Afrasiyab near Samarkand. Initially, total travel time was still more than two and half-hours but services were upgraded to five times a week in January 2012, and daily services started from 13 February 2012. The travel time has been reduced to 2:08 hours as of 10 February 2013.

=== Further extensions ===
The high-speed rail line is expected to be extended to Khiva via Urgench, in order to connect all the major Silk Road cities in Uzbekistan. In December 2018, a new station opened in Khiva, and a 30 kilometres (19 mi) railroad connects it to Urgench. The connection between Bukhara and Urgench was expected to be completed in 2021. As of February 2022, the line between Bukhara and Urgench is still in progress. When the line is completed, travel between Tashkent and Khiva should take 7 hours.

In March 2024, Uzbekistan Railways announced the purchase of South Korean Hyundai Rotem's high-speed trains UTY EMU-250 based on KTX-Eum to service the route.

=== Criticism ===
As of 2024, tickets for the Afrosiyob service are extremely hard to come by due to advance bookings by foreign tour groups as well as local resellers booking all the tickets sometimes months in advance. As a result, the Uzbek taxpayers have little to no direct benefit from their investment.

== Routes ==
Routes as of 31 August 2019:

- Tashkent–Samarqand–Navoiy–Bukhara
- Tashkent–Samarqand–Karshi
