= Korail Class 8000 =

Retired South Korean electric locomotive

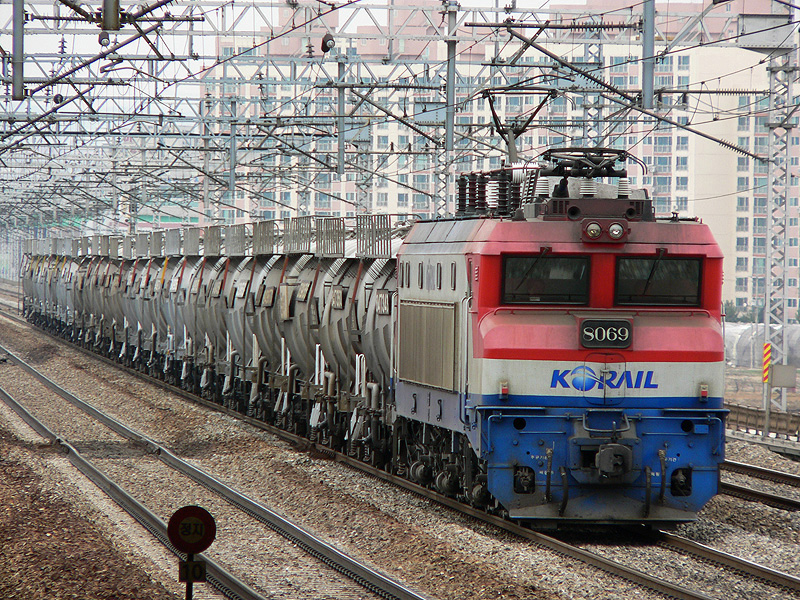
- EL 8069 on the Gyeongbu Line (Retirement)
Type and origin
- Power type: Electric
- Designer: Alstom
- Builder: Alstom (8001–8090); Daewoo Heavy Industry (8091–8094)
- Build date: March 1972 to 1980 (Alstom); 1986 to 1990 (Daewoo Heavy Industry)
- Total produced: 94
Specifications
- Configuration
  - AAR: B-B-B
  - UIC: Bo-Bo-Bo
- Gauge: 1,435 mm (4 ft 8 1/2 in)
- Wheel diameter: 1,250 mm (4 ft 1 in)
- Length: 20,730 mm (68 ft 0 in)
- Width: 3,060 mm (10 ft 0 in)
- Height: 4,495 mm (14 ft 9 in)
- Loco weight: 132 tonnes (130 long tons; 146 short tons)
- Electric system/s: 25 kV 60 Hz AC Catenary
- Current pickup: Pantograph
Performance figures
- Maximum speed: 85 km/h (53 mph)
- Power output: 3,900 kW (5,200 hp)223kN
Career
- Preserved: 15
- Scrapped: 2012-2026

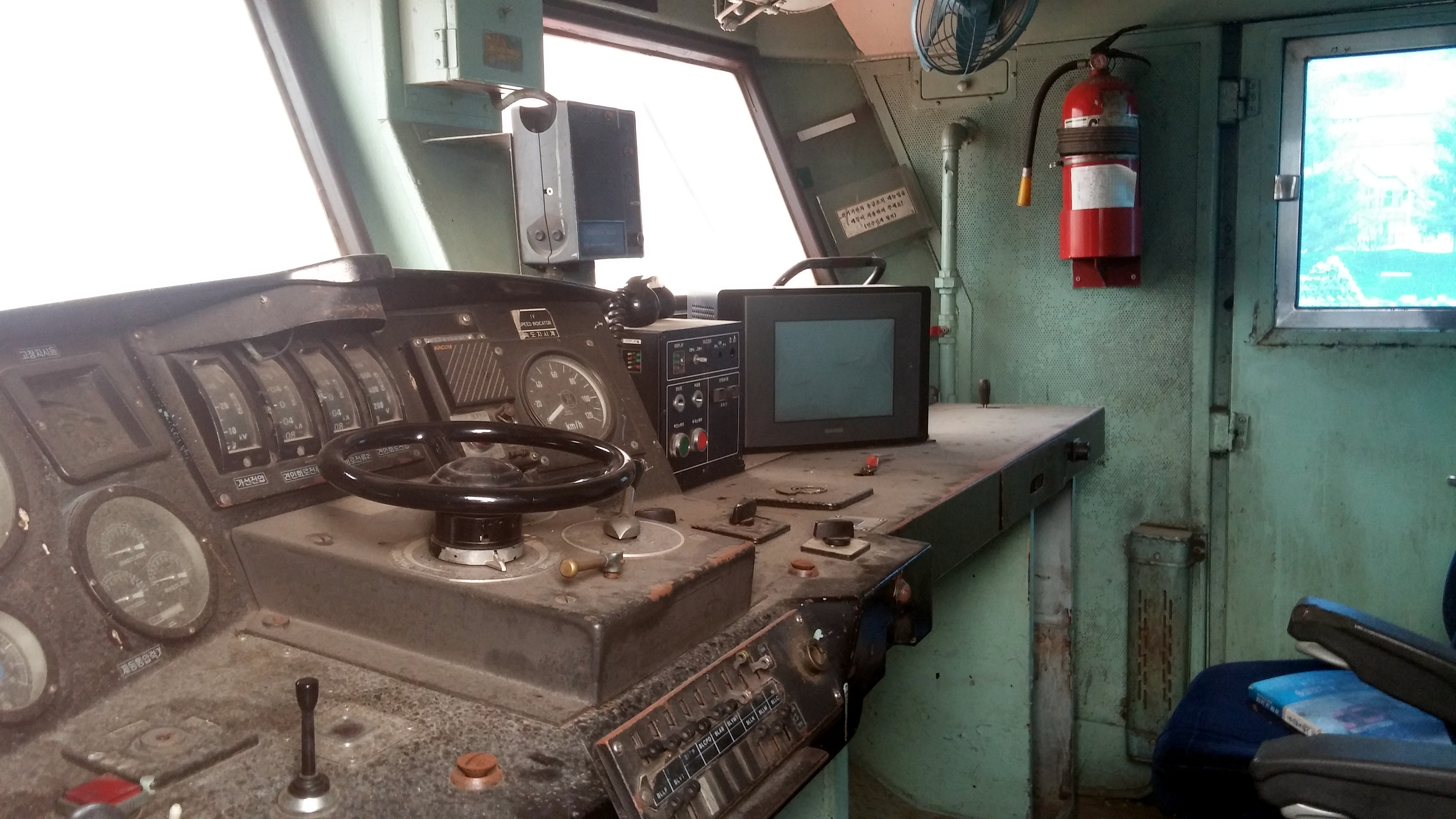
Driver's cab of 8017

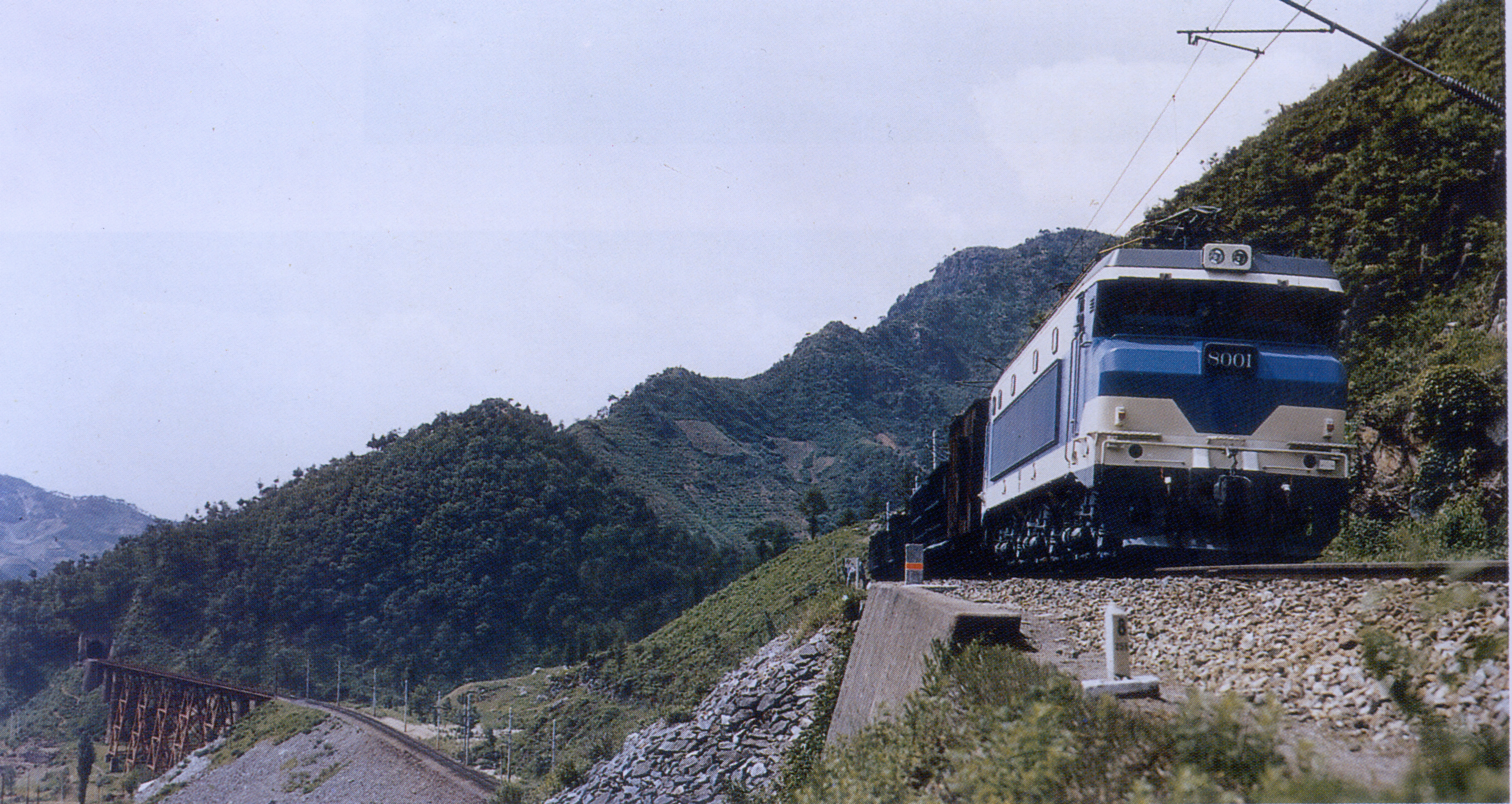
8001 on the Jungang Line in April 1979 (Retirement)

The Korail Class 8000 locomotive were a series of South Korean electric locomotives operated by Korail. This locomotive was introduced from 1972 to 1990, after electrification of several industrial lines. It was assigned both passenger and freight duty until the introduction of the 8200 series, which restricted the older locomotives to solely freight service. 94 were built (numbered 8001-8094), but many have been retired as new replacements enter service.

== Technical details ==
The locomotive was designed by the 50- Hertz Group, which consisted of European manufacturers Alstom, Siemens, MTE, Brown, Boveri & Cie, ACEC, and AEG, and was led by Alstom. The locomotive has three bogies in Bo-Bo-Bo arrangement. With six 650 kW (870 hp) DC motors, the total power is 3,900 kW (5,200 hp). The gear ratio is 15:96, and top speed 85 km/h (53 mph), optimized for mountain lines with steep grades and short radius curves. The design was inspired by contemporary French locomotives, such as SNCF Class BB 15000 and SNCF Class CC 6500.

== Accidents ==
On November 3, 1975, units 8056 and 8058 fell off the Seonam bridge, on the Taebaek Line. 8056 was refurbished in KNR Seoul Factory in January 1977, 8058 was rebuilt by Hanjin Heavy Industry in January 1979.

== Retirement ==
As the Class 8000 locomotives neared the end of their 30-year lifespans, Korail found the need to order replacement locomotives. The replacements came to be known as the Korail 8500 locomotives, and have been steadily entering service since 2012. The majority of the Class 8000 locomotives have been retired by the new Class 8500 locomotives; (from the entire order of 8001-8094).

Units 8001 and 8091 are expected to be preserved at this time. They are currently stored out of service.

== Bibliography ==
- Byun, Seong Woo (August 1999). 한국철도차량 100년사: 철도차량기술검정단 한국철도차량 100년사 편찬위원회 편찬 [100 Years of Korean Railway Vehicles: Compilation of the 100 Year History of Korean Railroad Vehicles by the Railroad Vehicle Technology Inspection Group] (in Korean). Seoul: Railroad Vehicle Technology Inspection Team.
