= UTY EMU-250 =

Uzbek Railways' high-speed train built by Hyundai Rotem

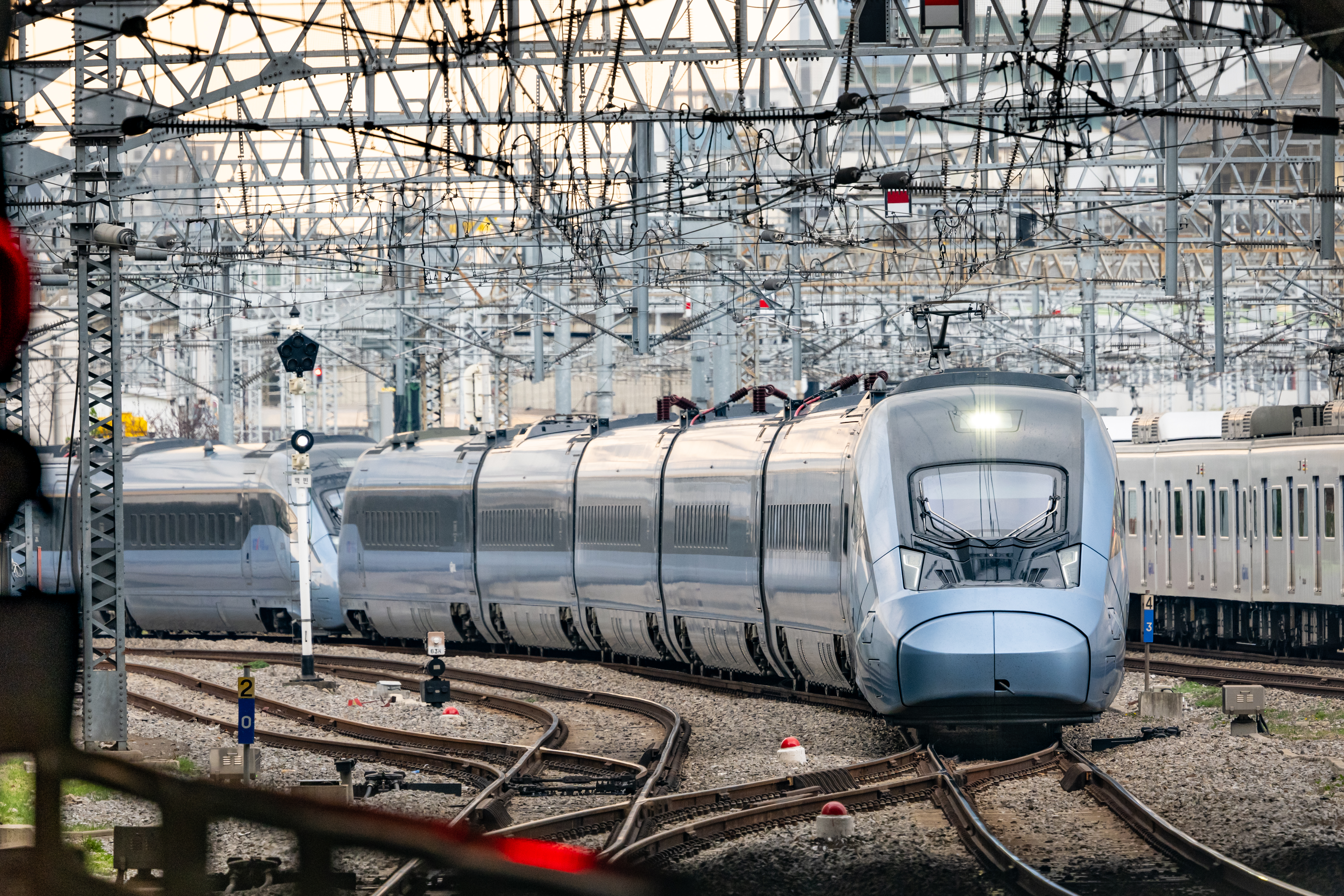
- The design of the UTY EMU-250 is based on the KTX-Eum (pictured).
- In service: 5 May 2026; 4 months ago
- Manufacturer: Hyundai Rotem
- Constructed: 2025–present
- Entered service: May 5, 2026
- Number under construction: 42 vehicles (6 sets)
- Operator: Uzbek Railways
- Line served: Tashkent–Bukhara high-speed rail line

Specifications
- Width: 3,150 mm (10 ft 4 in)
- Maximum speed: 250 km/h (160 mph)
- Electric system: 25 kV 60 Hz Overhead catenary
- Track gauge: 1,520 mm (4 ft 11 27/32 in) Russian gauge

The UTY EMU-250 is a high-speed electric multiple unit trainset derived from the South Korean KTX family for Afrosiyob, Uzbekistan's high-speed rail service. The trains will be manufactured in South Korea by Hyundai Rotem, and will be the first South Korean KTX trains exported overseas. This export model to Uzbekistan will be partially modified from the KTX-Eum to suit local conditions in the country.

== History ==
On June 14, 2024, Hyundai Rotem won a KR₩270 billion order for the Supply and Maintenance of Distributed Power High-Speed rail from the Uzbek Railways (UTY). Specifically, the company signed a contract to supply vehicles and provide maintenance (2 years of light maintenance and 9 months of heavy maintenance) to the Uzbek Railways, and the railways of both countries and the company of Hyundai Rotem signed a Memorandum of understanding (MOU) for high-speed rail operation and maintenance.

On December 10, 2025, Hyundai Rotem announced that the trains were shipped to Uzbekistan ahead of schedule.

A total of 42 units (6 trains) of UTY EMU-250, based on the KTX-Eum model, will be delivered, with the first train entered service in May 2026, and the remaining five units to follow by September 2027.

== Specifications ==
The six car UTY EMU-250 is 175 m (574 ft 2 in), with seats to accommodate up to 389 passengers. The EMU-250 will be modified according to the Uzbek Railways' needs. The main differences are as follows.

	UTY EMU-250	KTX-Eum
Formation	7 cars per train	6 cars per train
Class	VIP Class, Business Class, Standard Class	Superior Class, Standard Class
Track gauge	1,520 mm (4 ft 11 27/32 in)	1,435 mm (4 ft 8 1/2 in)
Maximum operational speed	250 km/h (160 mph)	260 km/h (160 mph)
Internal steps	Yes	No (level boarding available at high platforms)

The additional steps for boarding and disembarking are due to the 200 mm (7.9 in) platforms in Uzbekistan, considerably lower than in South Korea. South Korean products account for 87% of vehicle parts.
