= Hyundai Rotem =

South Korean machinery manufacturer

Hyundai Rotem Company

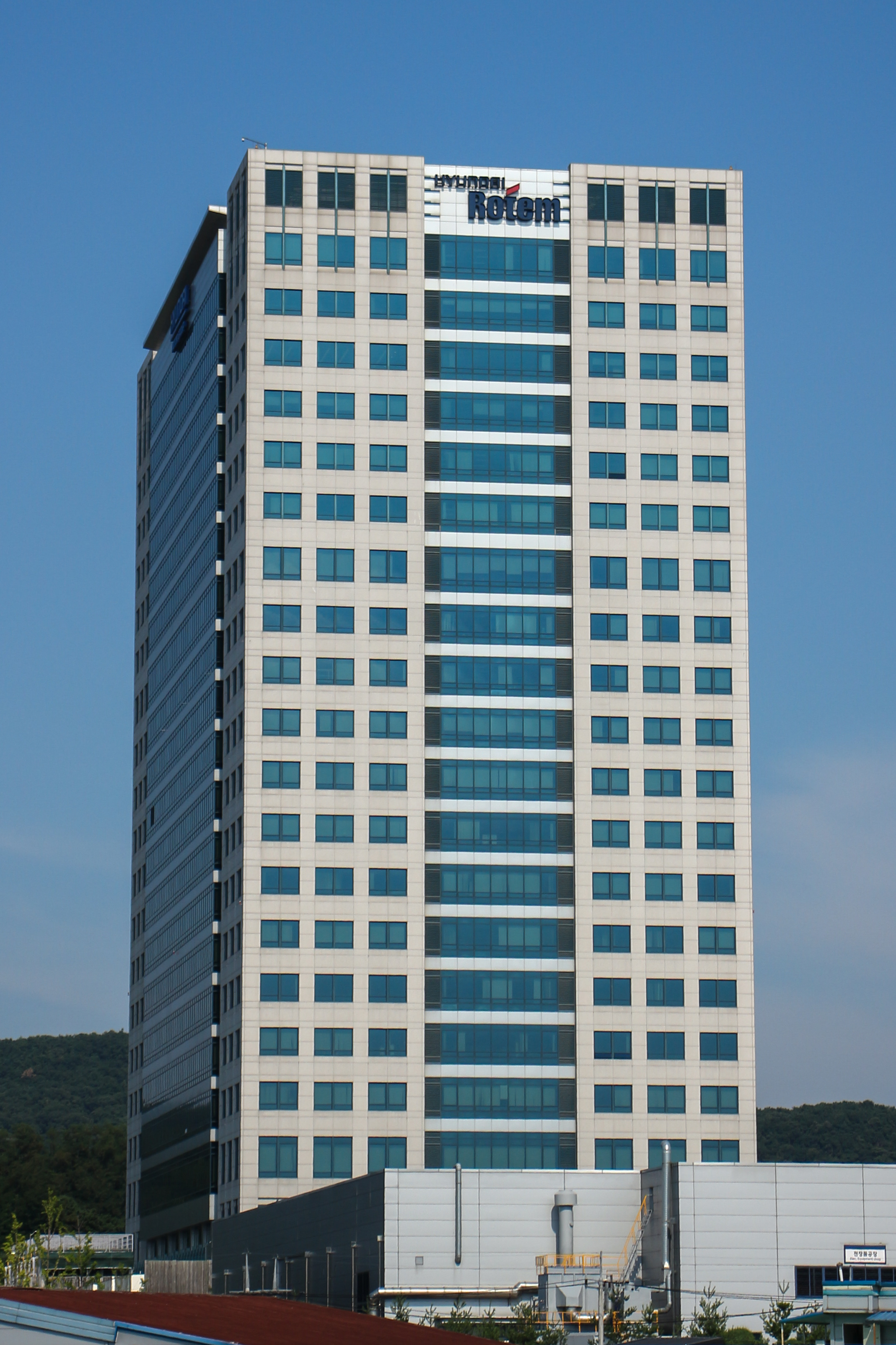
- Hyundai Rotem headquarters and research centre in Uiwang
- Native name: 현대로템 주식회사
- Formerly: Korea Rolling Stock Corporation (1999–2001); Rotem Company (2002–2007)
- Type: Public
- Traded as: KRX: 064350
- Industry: Defense; Factories; Railways
- Predecessors: Rolling stock divisions of Hyundai Precision Industry, Daewoo Heavy Industries, and Hanjin Heavy Industries
- Founded: 1 July 1977; 49 years ago (official designation); 1 July 1999; 27 years ago (as Korea Rolling Stock Corporation)
- Headquarters: Uiwang, Gyeonggi-do, South Korea (corporate headquarters); Changwon, Gyeongsangnam-do, South Korea (registered office, major production location)
- Area served: Worldwide
- Key people: Lee Yong-bae (CEO)
- Products: Manufacturing plants; Military vehicles; Railway vehicles; Railway signalling
- Revenue: ▲ ₩5.839 trillion (2025)
- Operating income: ▲ ₩1.0056 trillion (2025)
- Net income: ▲ ₩770.5 billion (2025)
- Total assets: ▲ ₩9.318 trillion (2025)
- Total equity: ▲ ₩3.0412 trillion (2025)
- Owners: Hyundai Motor Company (33.77%); National Pension Service (7.07%); BlackRock (5.00%); (Note: As of 31 July 2026)
- Number of employees: 4,190 (2024)
- Parent: Hyundai Motor Group
- Subsidiaries: EUROTEM
- Website: Official website in English; Official website in Korean

- Hyundai Rotem Company
- Hangul: 현대로템 주식회사
- Hanja: 現代로템 株式會社
- RR: Hyeondae Rotem jusikhoesa
- MR: Hyŏndae Rot'em chusikhoesa

Hyundai Rotem Company, often referred to as Hyundai Rotem (Korean: 현대로템), is a South Korean manufacturer of railway rolling stock, railway signalling, defense products and plant equipment. It is a member of Hyundai Motor Group and has presence in more than 50 countries worldwide. As of 2024, Hyundai Rotem has more than 4,100 employees.

== History ==
As part of the government-led restructuring in the wake of 1997 Asian financial crisis, Korea Rolling Stock Corporation (KOROS, Korean: 한국철도차량 주식회사) was founded on 1 July 1999 as a result of the merger between three major rolling stock divisions of Hanjin Heavy Industries, Daewoo Heavy Industries, and Hyundai Precision Industry.

In 2000, Hyundai Precision Industry sold its defence and plant businesses to KOROS, effectively making KOROS an affiliate company of Hyundai Motor Company. Hyundai Precision Industry was renamed as Hyundai Mobis in the same year. In August 2001, in an aftermath of Daewoo Group's dissolution, Daewoo Heavy Industries agreed to sell its stake in KOROS to Hyundai Mobis, which let the latter become the majority shareholder of the company. KOROS subsequently changed its name to Rotem Company (Korean: 주식회사 로템), where "Rotem" is known to be short for "Railroading Technology System", on 1 January 2002.

In 2006, Morgan Stanley became a minority shareholder by buying shares from Hyundai Motor Company and participating in Rotem's rights offering, until 2018. In a separate event in the same year, Hanjin Heavy Industries sold its stake in Rotem to Morgan Stanley, leaving Hyundai Motor Group the only remaining pre-1999 merger corporate shareholder. Rotem Company added "Hyundai" (현대; 現代) to its name on 3 December 2007 to reflect its current affiliation. Its shares are listed in the Korea Exchange in October 2013.

While Hyundai Rotem officially designated its founding date as 1 July 1977, which was also the time when "Hyundai Precision Industry" was officially named, in certain of its publications, it tried to trace its roots to the rolling stock business of other pre-1999 merger entities, which started building rolling stock since 1964.

== Railway products ==
=== Rolling stock ===
Hyundai Rotem has been supplying majority of rolling stock in South Korea's railway network. They include Korail's KTX high-speed trains, electric multiple units (EMUs), locomotives, as well as the country's rapid transit networks, such as Seoul Metropolitan Subway, Busan Metro, and Daegu Metro.

International products include New South Wales D sets serving intercity services of Sydney Trains in Australia, K-Stock and R-Stock EMUs for Hong Kong's MTR, commuter EMUs for Taiwan, trains for the Delhi Metro, and automated trains for the Canada Line in Vancouver, Canada. In the United States, as of early 2025, it delivered 120 Silverliner V commuter trains for SEPTA Regional Rail in the Philadelphia area in Pennsylvania and 66 Silverliner Vs for Denver's Regional Transportation District (RTD) A Line.

In June 2024, South Korea and Uzbekistan concluded a KRW270 billion (approximately USD196 million at the time) deal to apply South Korean high-speed rail technology in Uzbekistan. It is the first export of high-speed trains with South Korean technology, where Hyundai Rotem will supply 6 sets (of 7 cars each) of high-speed trains, known as UTY EMU-250, which is a variant of KTX-Eum.

In September 2024, Hyundai Rotem's EMU-320 high-speed train (the original name is used for further research and sales after naming as KTX-Cheongryong in South Korea) obtained the design certification of Technical Specification for Interoperability (TSI), which paved the way for Hyundai Rotem into the European high-speed rail market.

As of early 2025, the largest order ever for Hyundai Rotem's rail solution division is a KRW2.2027 trillion (approximately USD1.5 billion at the time) contract to supply 110 sets of double-deck electric trains to the ONCF, Morocco's national railway operator, in the same year. It is the largest single order not only for the company but also for any South Korean rolling stock manufacturing company.

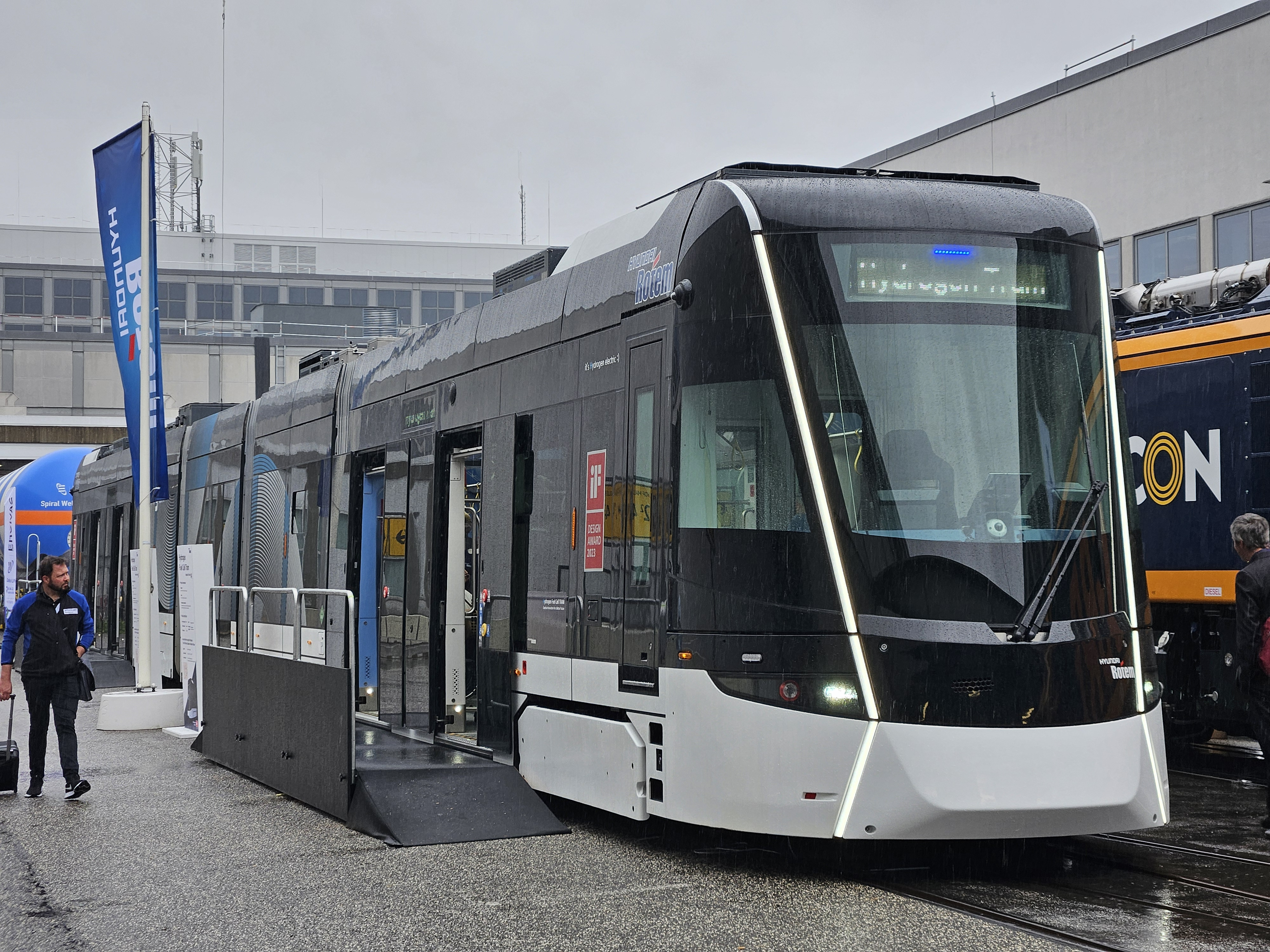
Hyundai Rotem hydrogen fuel cell tram being exhibited in InnoTrans 2024 in Berlin

Besides conventional trains powered by diesel, overhead wire and third rail, Hyundai Rotem is also developing hydrogen mobility technology based on the hydrogen fuel cell technology system of its holding company, Hyundai Motor Company. In 2021, a hybrid hydrogen fuel cell tram prototype was unveiled. A revised design was exhibited during InnoTrans 2022 in Berlin, which was later recognised in the product category of iF Design Award 2023, and with a full-scale tram exhibited in the RailLog Korea 2023. Detailed specifications of the tram were announced in 2024, with the same full-scale tram being showcased in InnoTrans in the same year. Mass production model is expected to be firstly introduced to Daejeon Metro Line 2 in South Korea, which is scheduled to commence operations in 2028. Other types of rolling stock, such as hydrogen fuel cell-powered locomotives and EMUs, are also under development.

=== List of rolling stock manufactured by Hyundai Rotem ===
In the list below, not only the rolling stock built by Hyundai Rotem (also KOROS and Rotem, before their renaming) are included, those built by the pre-1999 merger entities of Hyundai Precision Industry, Daewoo Heavy Industries, and Hanjin Heavy Industries are also included.

==== High-speed trains ====
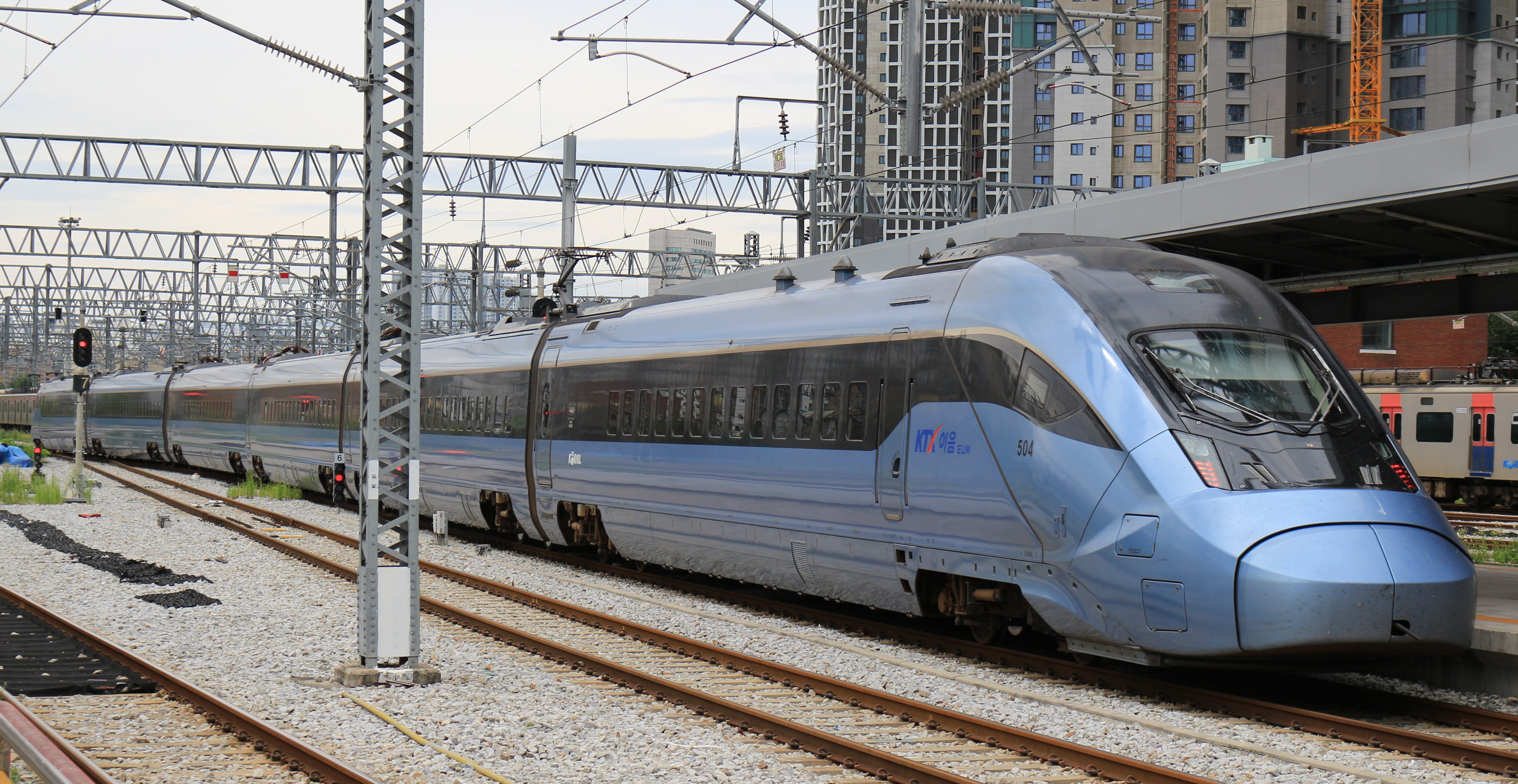
KTX-Eum, South Korea's first domestically designed and developed high-speed EMU

- South Korea
  - KTX-I (34 of 46 trainsets, manufactured under Alstom licence)
  - HSR-350x experimental train
  - KTX-Sancheon
  - HEMU-430X experimental train (maximum speed: 421.4 km/h (261.8 mph))
  - KTX-Eum (EMU-260)
  - KTX-Cheongryong (EMU-320)
- Uzbekistan – Uzbekistan Railways UTY EMU-250 (6 7-car trains; designed based on KTX-Eum)

==== Regional / Intercity EMUs ====
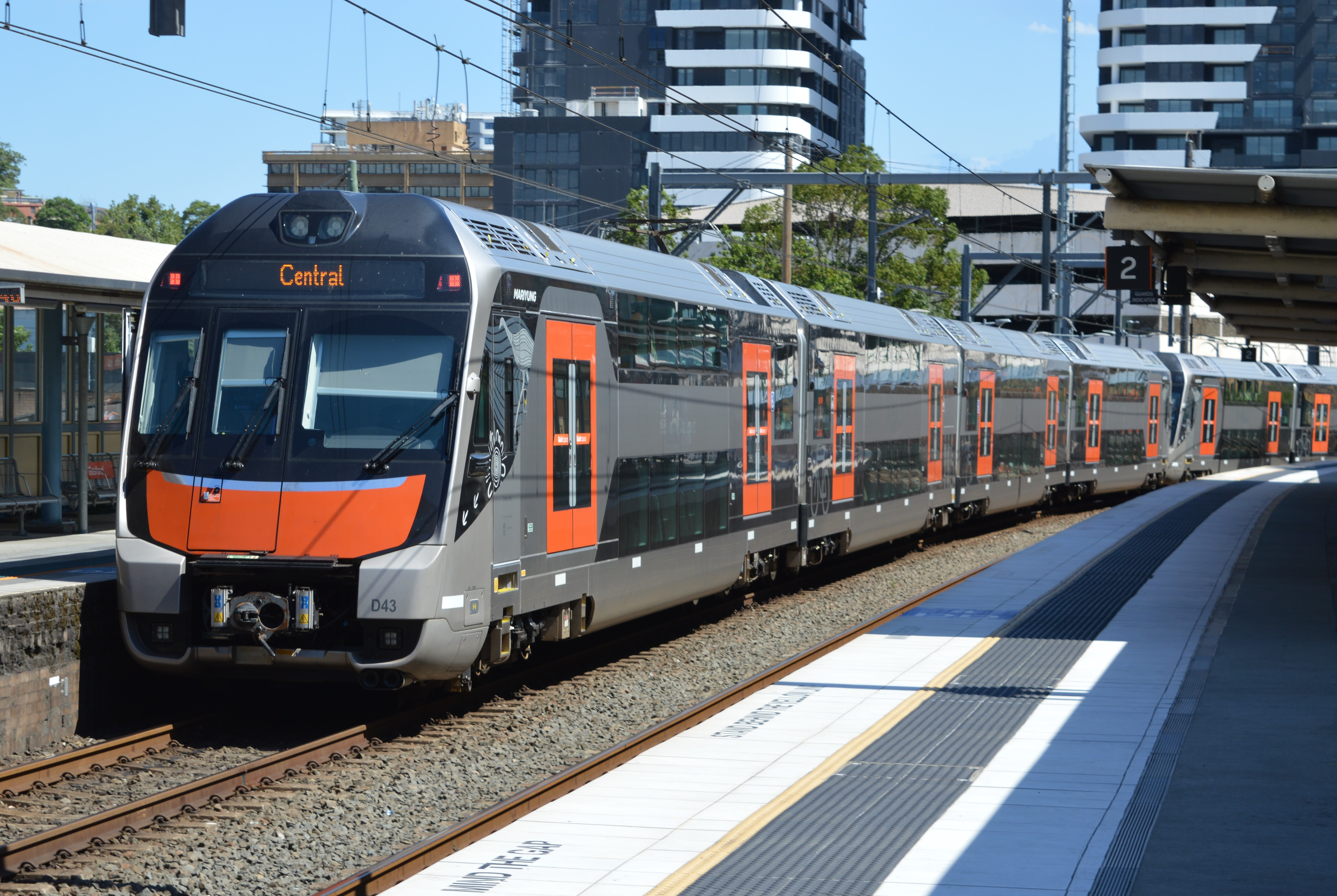
New South Wales D set in Australia

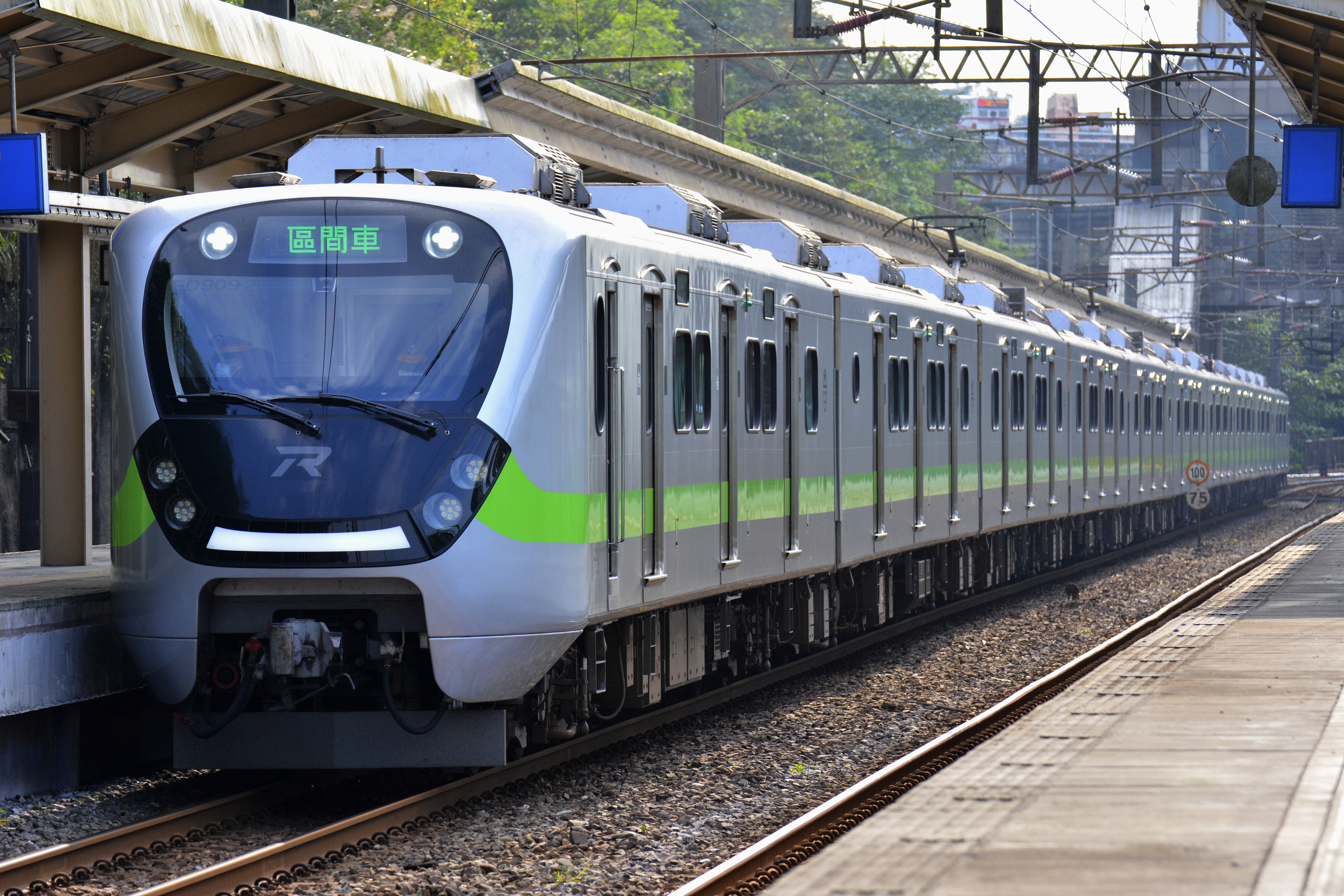
Taiwan Railway EMU900 series

- Australia – New South Wales D sets for Sydney Trains, linking Sydney with the Blue Mountains, Central Coast, Newcastle, Illawarra, Wollongong, Shellharbour and South Coast district areas
- Australia – Queensland Train Manufacturing Program for Queensland Rail (65 6-car trains, on order; to be jointly built by Hyundai Rotem and Downer Rail in Queensland)
- Brazil – CPTM Series 9500 EMU in São Paulo
- Brazil – Supervia Series 2005 EMU in Rio de Janeiro
- Malaysia – Keretapi Tanah Melayu
  - Class 83 (built by Hyundai Precision)
  - Class 91
- Morocco – double-decker trains for ONCF's RER suburban and regional services (110 sets, on order)
- New Zealand – FP class for Greater Wellington Regional Council, for use in Wellington
- South Korea – AREX
  - Class 1000 for express services
  - Class 2000 for local services
- South Korea – Korail
  - Class 210000 on the ITX-Saemaeul
  - Class 368000 on the ITX-Cheongchun
- South Korea – SG Rail A000 series EMU on GTX-A
- Taiwan – Taiwan Railway
  - EMU500 series (built by Daewoo)
  - EMU600 series (built by KOROS/Rotem)
  - EMU900 series
- Tanzania – EMUs for Tanzania SGR (appearance resembling Korail Class 210000)
- Tunisia – Sahel Metro, Tunis RFR Lines A, D and E
- Turkey – TCDD Transport
  - Marmaray E32000 series
  - Başkentray E23000 series
- Turkey – İZBAN E22100 series
- Ukraine – HRCS2 for Ukrainian Railways
- United States – Silverliner V for SEPTA Regional Rail (Philadelphia) and RTD Commuter Rail (Denver)

==== Metro / Commuter EMUs ====
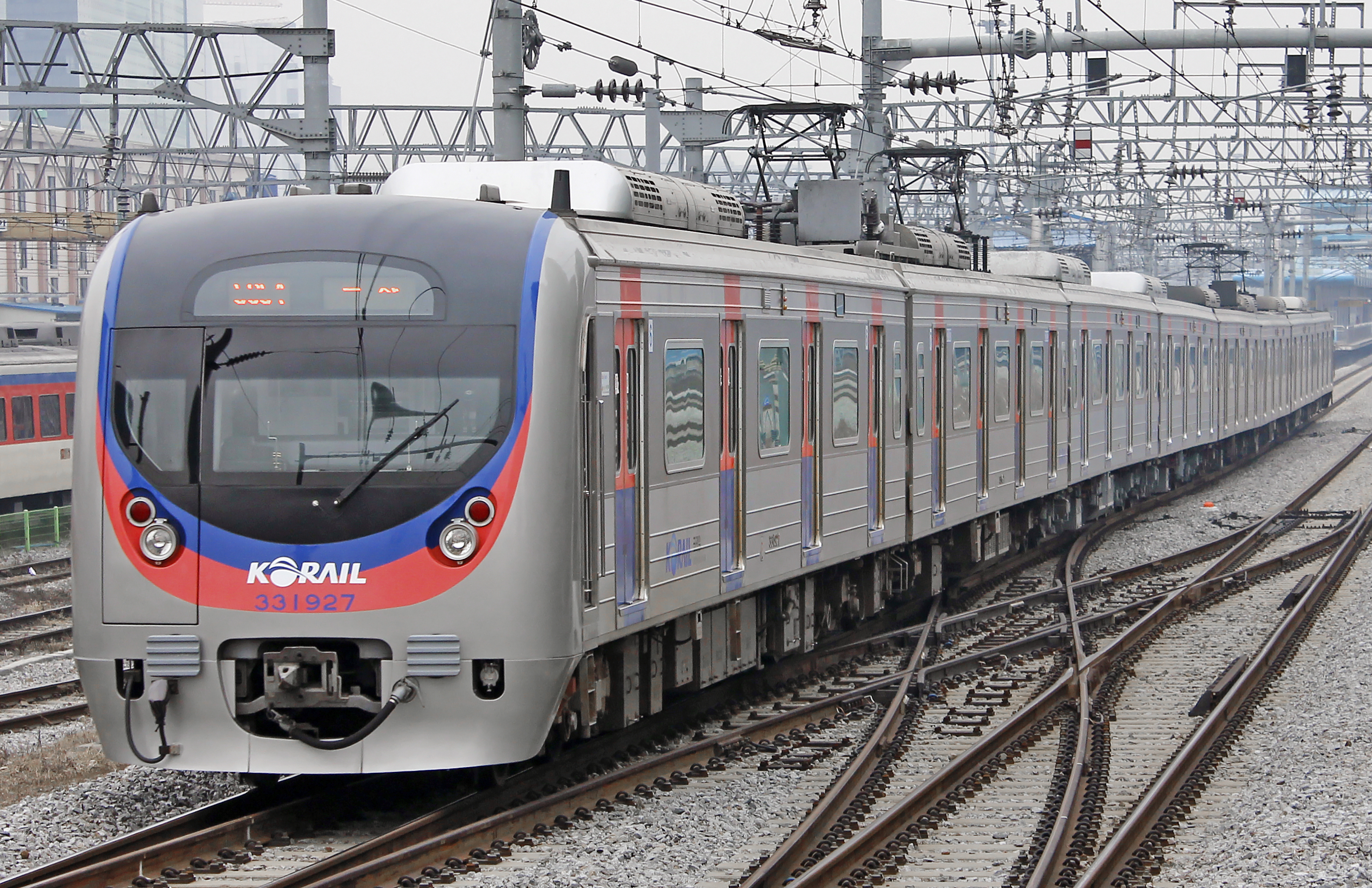
Korail Class 331000 trainset on Gyeongui–Jungang Line

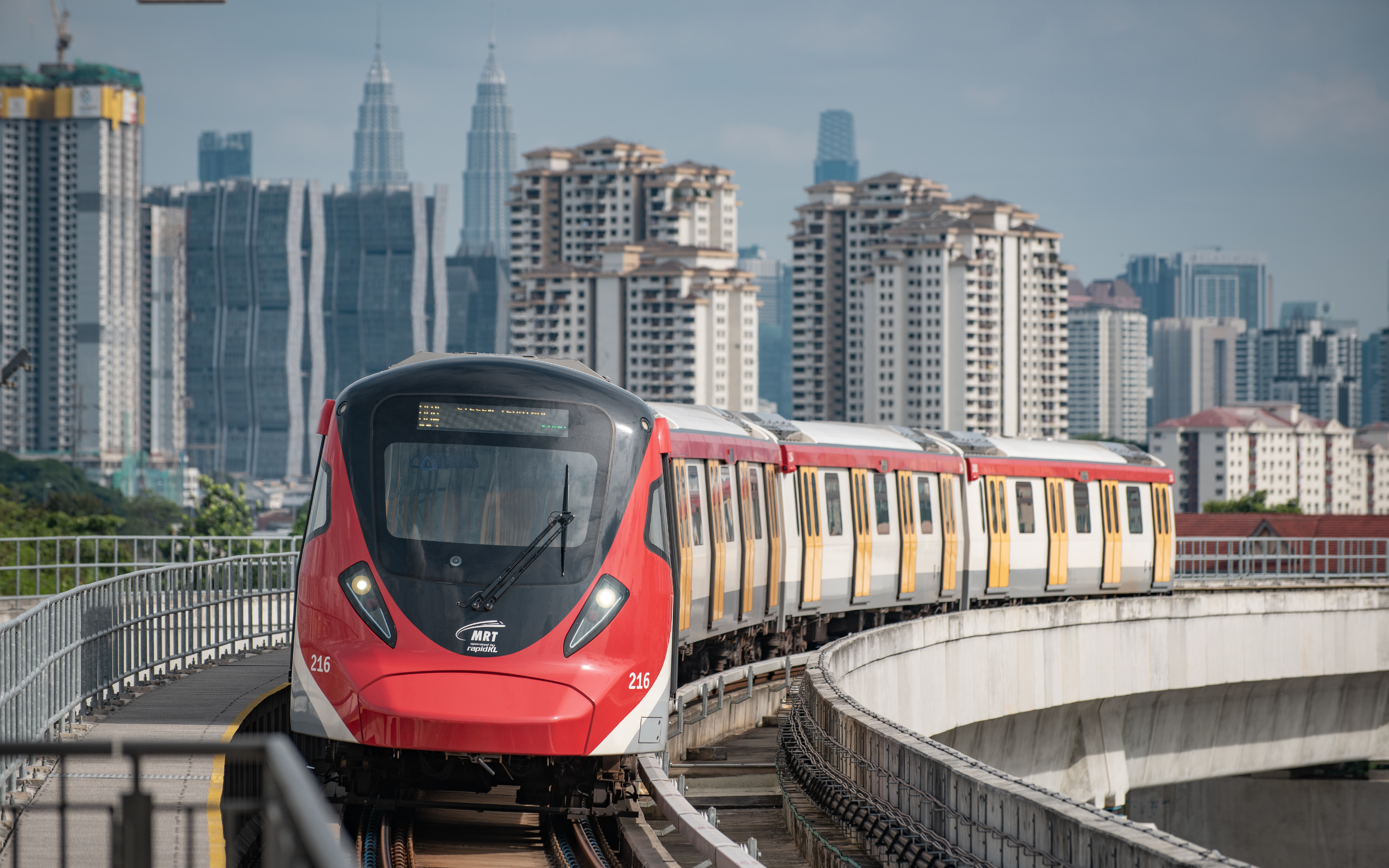
Putrajaya Line trainset of Klang Valley Mass Rapid Transit in Malaysia

- Brazil – EMUs for São Paulo Metro Line 4
- Brazil – EMUs for Salvador Metro
- Canada – Vancouver SkyTrain Canada Line Hyundai Rotem EMU
- Egypt – EMUs for Cairo Metro Lines 1, 2 and 3
- Greece – EMUs for Athens Metro Lines 2, 3 and Athens Airport service
- Hong Kong – MTR
  - K-train for Tseung Kwan O line (previously Kwun Tong line) and Tung Chung line
  - R-train for East Rail line
- India – Delhi Metro
  - Phase 1 – broad gauge EMUs: Red Line, Yellow Line (erstwhile user), Blue Line
  - Phase 2 – standard gauge EMUs: Green Line, Violet Line
  - Phase 3 – standard gauge driverless EMUs: Pink Line, Magenta Line, Grey Line
- India – EMUs for Ahmedabad Metro, Bangalore Metro, Hyderabad Metro, Nagpur Metro
- Kazakhstan – Almaty Metro EMUs
- Malaysia – Klang Valley Mass Rapid Transit Putrajaya line EMUs
- Philippines – Manila LRT Line 2 2000 class (with Toshiba for electrical components)
- Philippines – Manila MRT Line 7 000 class
- Singapore – J151 trainsets for MRT Jurong Region Line
- South Korea – Seoul Metropolitan Subway
  - Majority of EMUs for Gyeongui–Jungang Line, Suin–Bundang Line, Seohae Line, Gyeongchun Line, Gyeonggang Line (operated by Korail)
  - Majority of EMUs for Seoul Subway Line 1, Line 3, Line 4 (jointly operated by Korail and Seoul Metro)
  - Some of EMUs for Seoul Subway Line 2, Line 5, Line 6, Line 7, Line 8 (operated by Seoul Metro)
  - Seoul Subway Line 9, Shinbundang Line EMUs
  - Incheon Subway Line 1 EMUs
- South Korea – Busan Metro
  - Class 1000 Batches 1 to 3 (built by Hyundai Precision and Hyundai Rotem)
  - Class 2000 Batches 1 and 2 (built by Hanjin and Rotem)
  - Class 3000 (built by Rotem)
- South Korea – Daegu Metro
  - Line 1 (built by Hanjin) and Line 2 EMUs
  - Korail Class 392000 for Daegyeong Line
- South Korea – Daejeon Metro Line 1 EMUs
- South Korea – Gwangju Metro Line 1 EMUs
- Taiwan – Taoyuan Metro
  - Green Line EMUs
  - Brown Line EMUs
- Taiwan – Taipei Metro CR381A EMUs
- Taiwan – Kaohsiung Metro Red Line extension EMUs
- Taiwan – Taichung MRT Blue Line EMUs
- Turkey – Istanbul Metro Line M2, Line M6, Line M7 and Line M8
- United States – Los Angeles Metro Rail HR5000

==== Trams and light rail vehicles (LRVs) ====
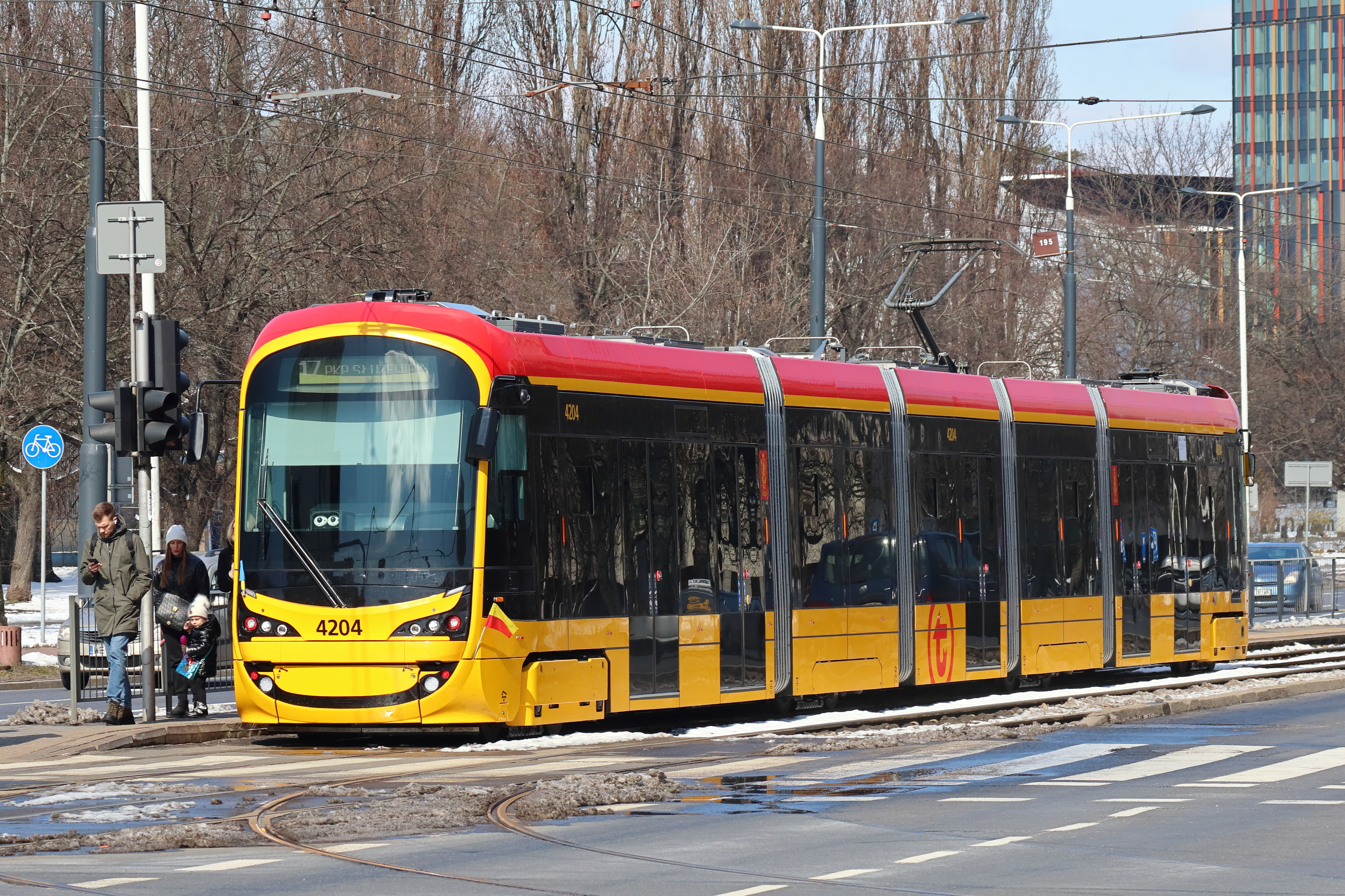
Hyundai Rotem 140N tram in Warsaw, Poland

- Canada – Edmonton LRT
  - Low-floor LRVs for the Valley Line (46 sets, on order)
  - High-floor LRVs for the Capital Line and Metro Line (40 sets, on order)
- Indonesia – high-floor LRVs for Jakarta LRT
- Philippines – Manila LRT Line 1 1100 class high-floor LRVs (with Adtranz)
- Poland – Warsaw tram network 140N, 141N, 142N (123 low-floor trams)
- South Korea – Seoul Metropolitan Subway
  - Ui LRT, Gimpo Goldline EMUs
  - Incheon Subway Line 2 first generation EMUs
- South Korea – Busan–Gimhae Light Rail Transit trainsets
- South Korea – hydrogen fuel cell trams for Daejeon Metro Line 2 (on order)
- Turkey – high-floor LRVs for Istanbul LRT T4, Adana Metro
- Turkey – low-floor LRVs for Antalya trams, Izmir trams

==== Diesel multiple units (DMUs) ====
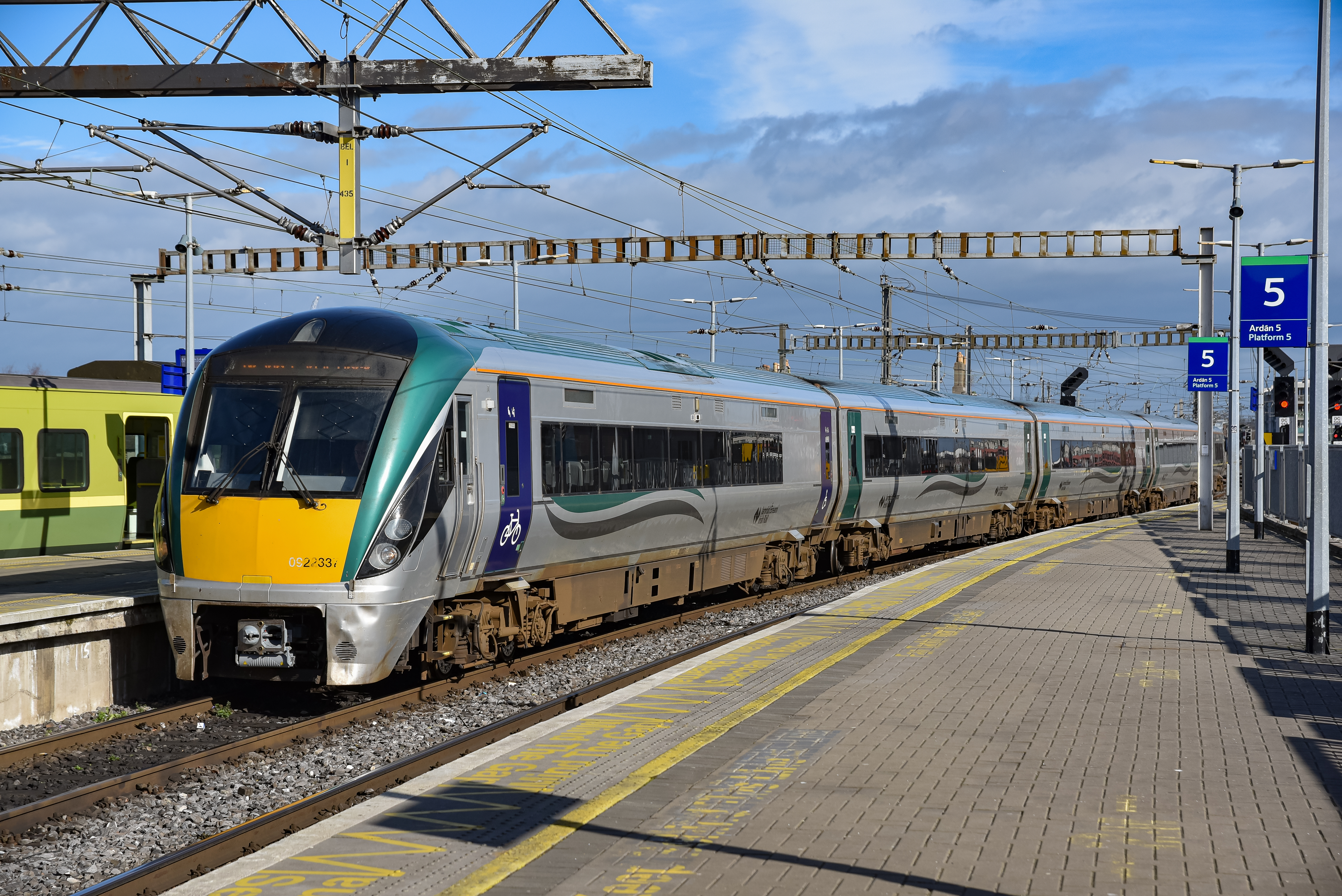
IÉ 22000 Class in Ireland

- Iran – Islamic Republic of Iran Railways railbus
- Ireland – Iarnród Éireann 22000 Class
- Philippines – PNR Metro Commuter Line DMUs
- South Korea – Korail
  - Saemaeul-ho diesel-hydraulic multiple units (built by Daewoo, Hanjin, and Hyundai Precision)
  - Commuter Diesel Car (CDC), Refurbished Diesel Car (RDC) (built by Daewoo)
- Syria – Syrian Railways
- Thailand – State Railway of Thailand (SRT) APD.20 and APD.60 DMUs (then by Daewoo)
- Turkey – TCDD Transport DM15000, MT30000

==== Push-pull coaches ====
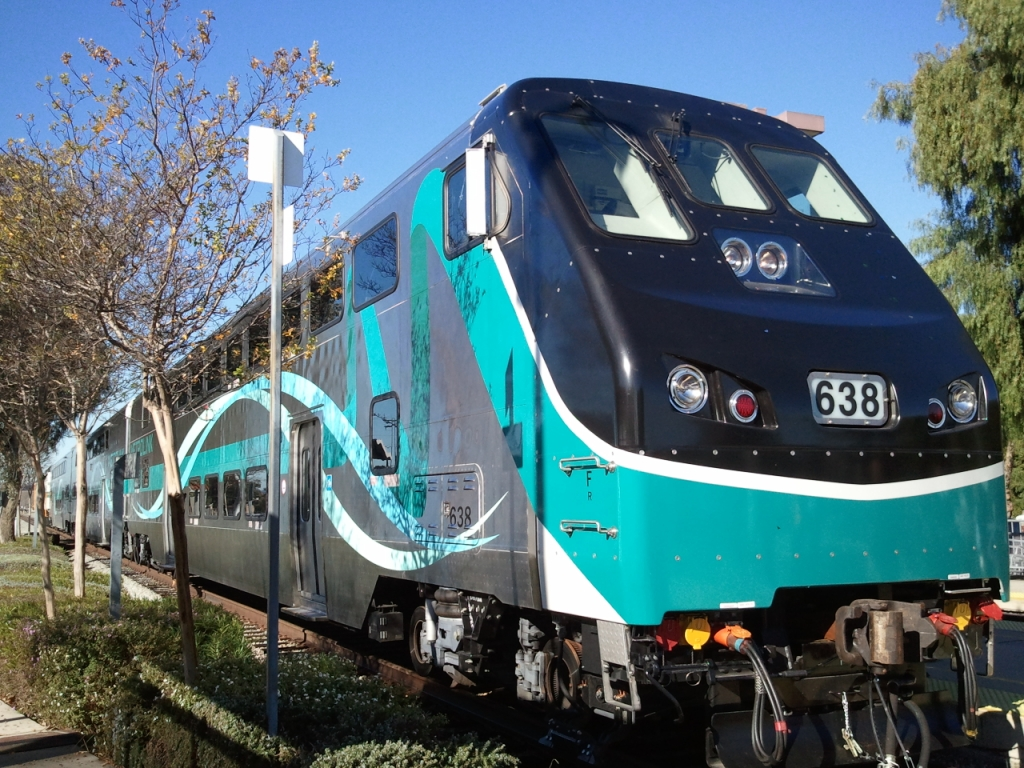
Metrolink Hyundai Rotem bi-level car in Southern California

- Taiwan – Taiwan Railway E1000 push-pull trains (Note: The contract was entered between the then Taiwan Railway Administration and Hyundai Precision, with the latter building passenger cars, and Union Carriage & Wagon was sub-contracted to build the locomotives.)
- United States – Rotem bi-level push-pull cars
  - MBTA BTC-4D and CTC-5 cars
  - Metrolink Guardian cars BTC-5
  - Tri-Rail BTC-5 push-pull cars

==== Locomotives ====
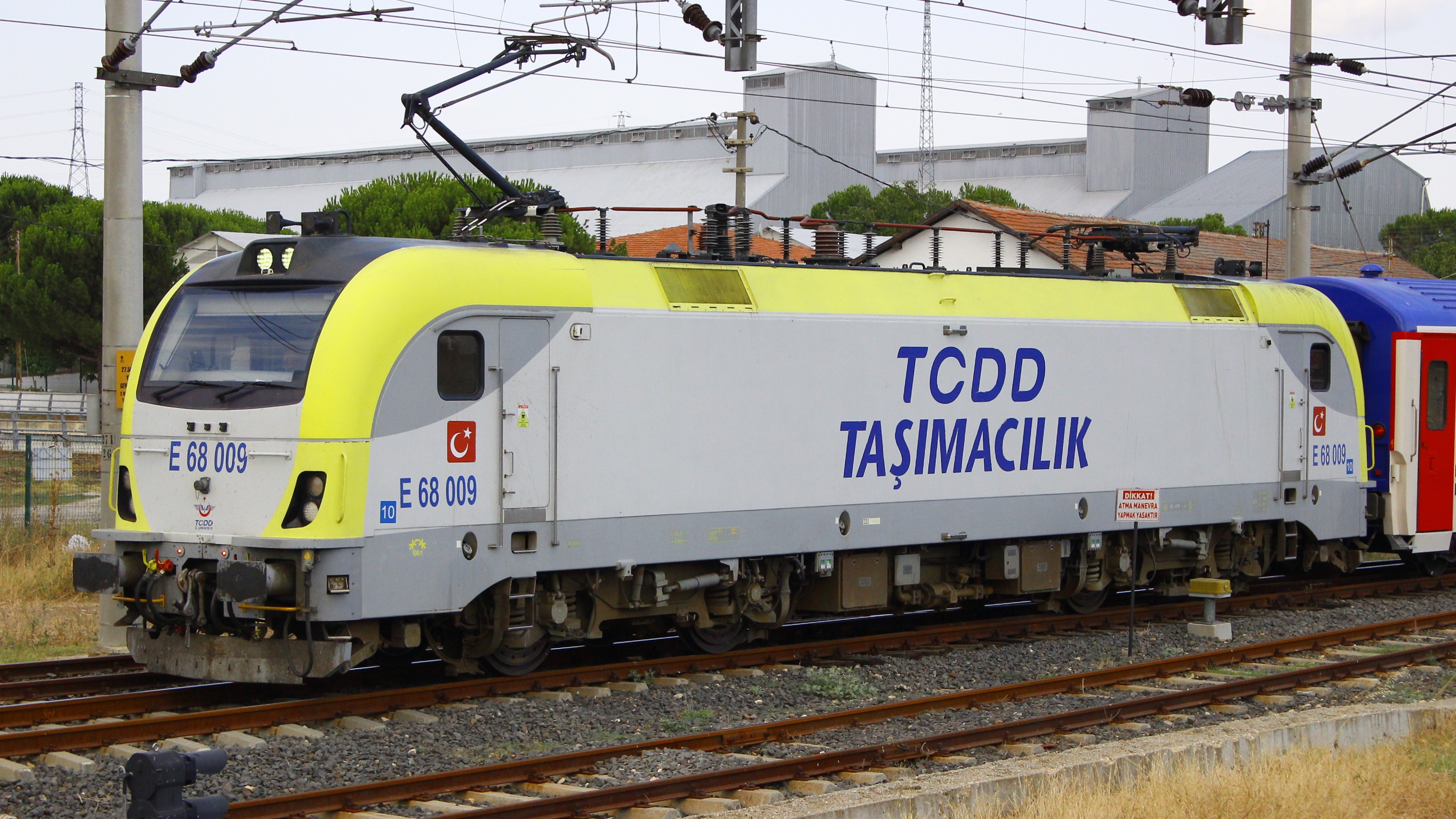
TCDD Transport E68000 electric locomotive in Turkey

- Bangladesh – Bangladesh Railway Classes 2900, 3000 diesel-electric locomotives (both under EMD licence)
- South Korea – Korail
  - Class 4400 (GT18B-M) diesel-electric locomotives
  - Class 7000, 7100, 7200, 7300, 7400, 7500 (GT26CW series) diesel-electric locomotives
  - Class 7600 (GE PowerHaul) diesel-electric locomotives
  - Class 8000 electric locomotives (4 of 94, under Alstom licence)
  - Class 8100, 8200 electric locomotives (under Siemens licence)
  - Class 8500 electric locomotives
- Tanzania – E68000 electric locomotives for Tanzania SGR
- Turkey – TCDD Transport E68000 electric locomotives (8 of 80, the remaining were licensed to TÜLOMSAŞ to build)

==== Maglev trains ====
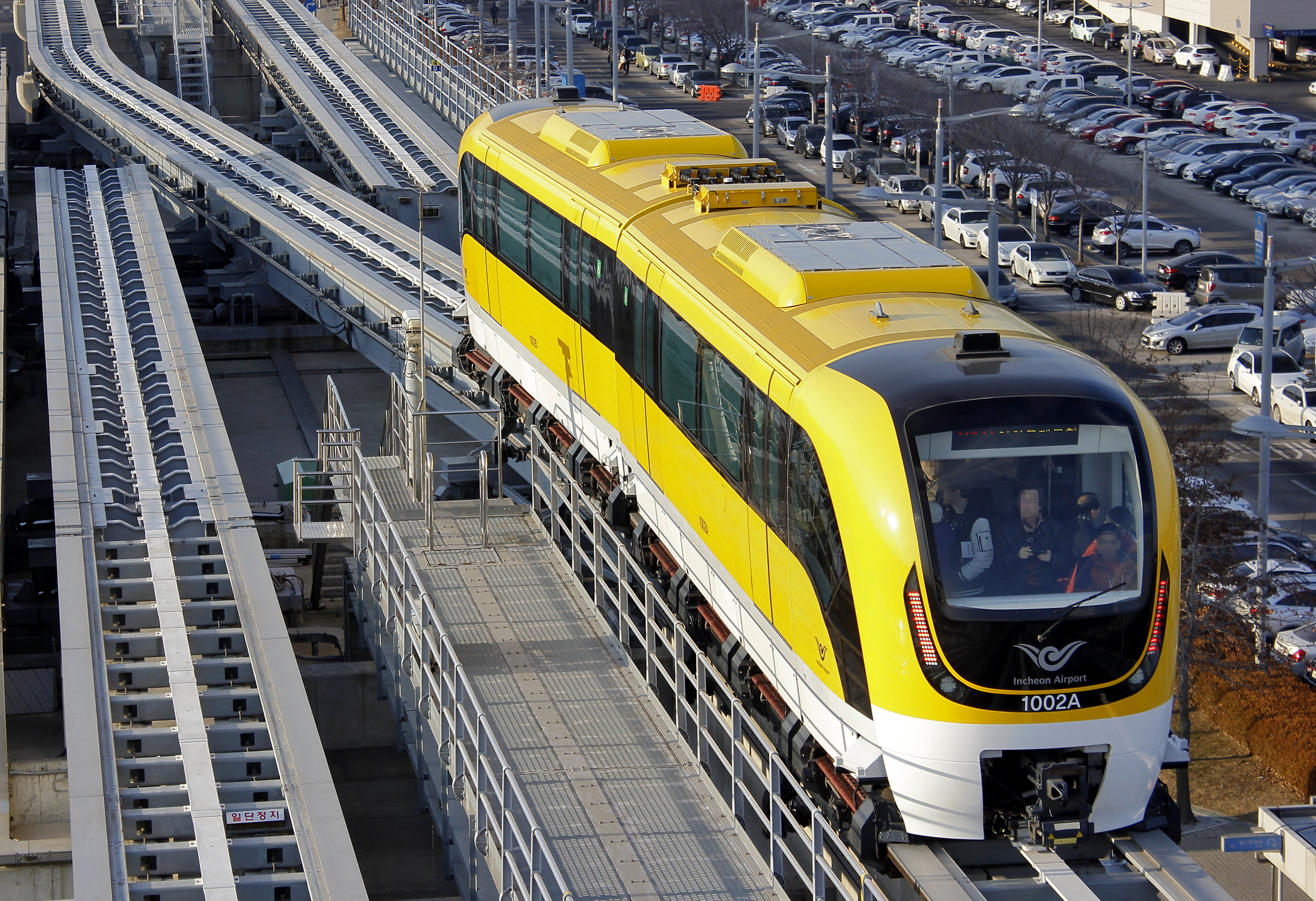
ECOBEE maglev train

- South Korea
  - ECOBEE on the Incheon Airport Maglev
  - UTM-02

==== Major train refurbishment / electrical components ====
- China – Traction system and motors for Shenzhen Metro Line 3 EMUs
- Singapore – Refurbishment of Kawasaki Heavy Industries C151 trains with Mitsui and LexBuild

=== Railway signalling ===
Hyundai Rotem is also involved in South Korea's national research project to develop a domestic railway signalling system, known as Korean Train Control System (KTCS), together with Ministry of Land, Infrastructure and Transport, Korea Railroad Research Institute, Korea National Railway, Korail, as well as other industry players such as LS Electric. In 2018, KTCS-2, a category of KTCS designed for mainline tracks, was successfully developed, then with the R&D, performance verification, and product certification completed by Hyundai Rotem. In 2023 and 2024, commercial operation of KTCS-2 systems installed by Hyundai Rotem commenced on the Jeolla Line and Daegyeong Line, respectively.

==== In commercial operation ====
- Jeolla Line (KTCS-2)
- Daegyeong Line (KTCS-2)

==== On test ====
- Ilsan Line (KTCS-M, another category of KTCS designed for urban rail transit)

== Defense products ==
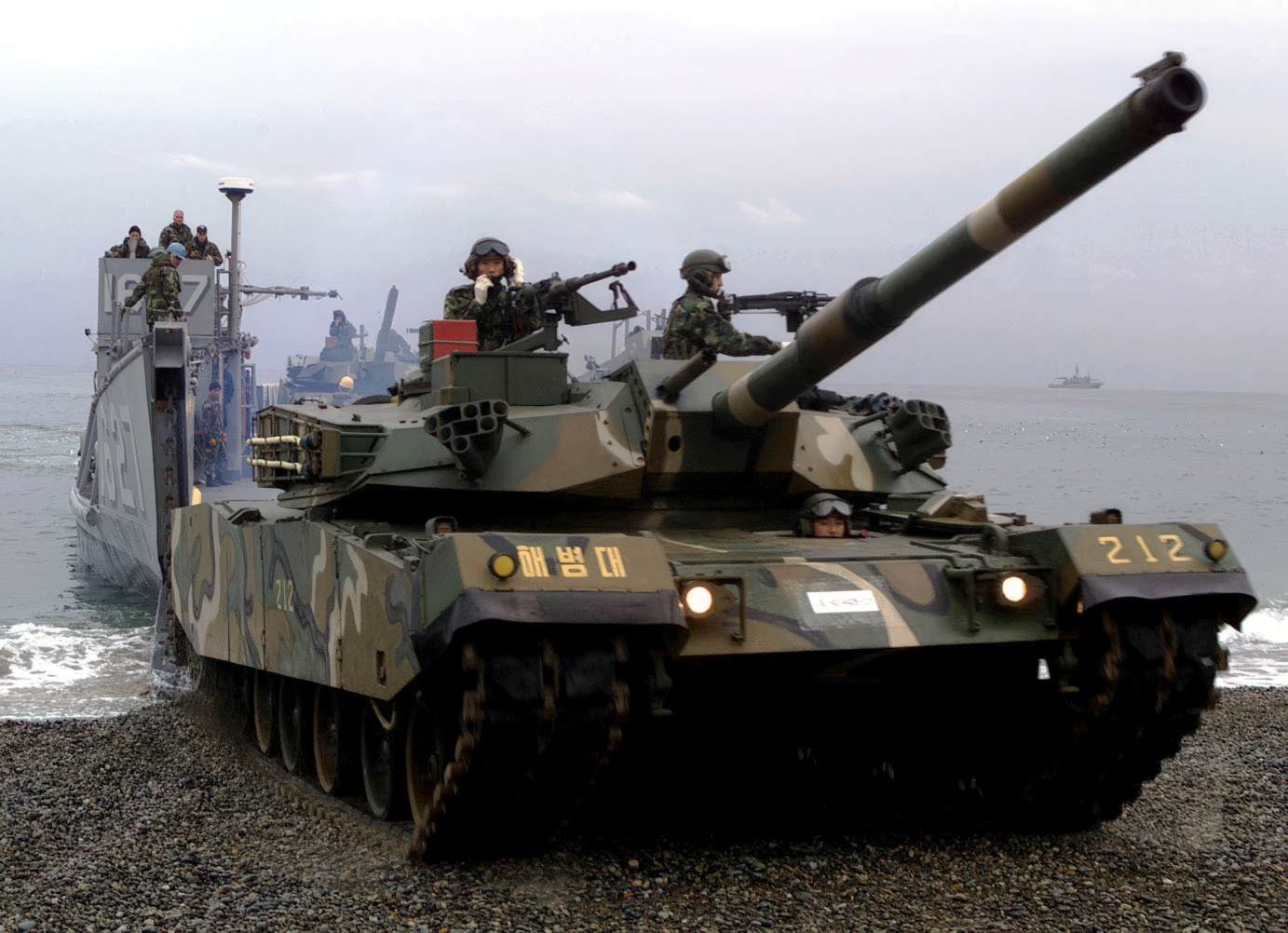
K1 main battle tank

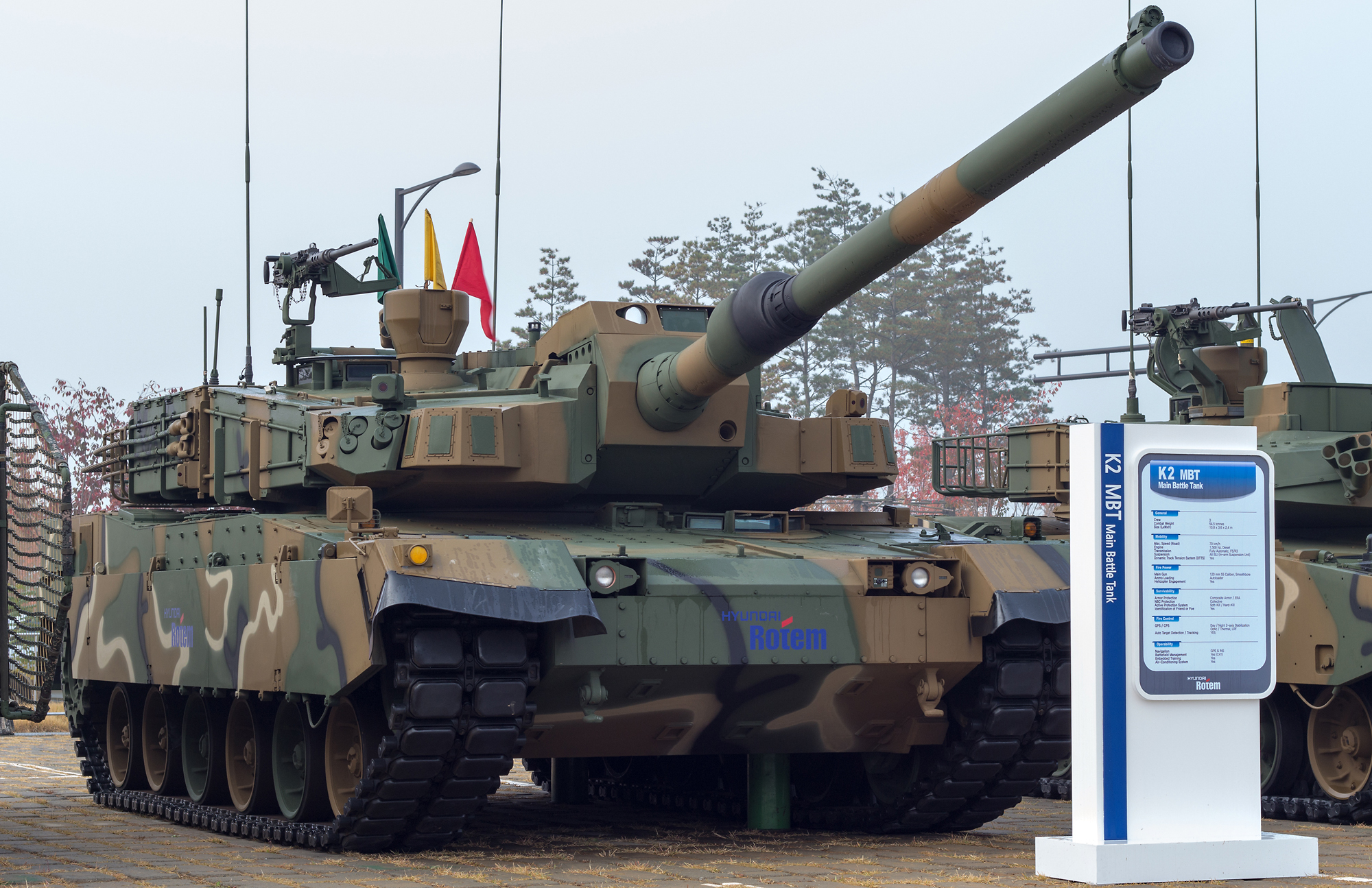
K2 Black Panther main battle tank

- K1 main battle tank (MBT)
- K1 armoured recovery vehicle (ARV)
- K2 Black Panther MBT
- K600 Rhino combat engineering vehicle (CEV)
- K808 White Tiger armored personnel carrier (APC)
- K806 White Tiger APC
- Decon machinery
- 60-ton heavy equipment transporter (HET)
- K1 tank gunnery trainer
- Depot maintenance
- Integrated logistics system

== Plant and Machinery products ==
- Logistics solutions
  - Automated guided vehicles for warehouses, ports
  - Baggage handling system
  - Conveyor system for automotive industry
  - Passenger boarding bridges to planes and cruise ships
- Mechanical press, Hydraulic press, Servo press, Auto racking system
- Steel mill construction
  - Electric arc furnace for steel-making
  - Ladle furnace, cranes
- Hydrogen infrastructure
  - Steam methane reforming (SMR) of natural gas
  - Hydrogen stations, shipping centres

== Selected railway projects ==
=== Hyderabad Metro ===
Hyderabad Metro Rail announced on September 12, 2012, that it has awarded the rolling stock tender to Hyundai Rotem of South Korea. The tender is for 57 rakes consisting of 171 cars which will delivered phase wise at least 9 months before the commencement of each stage. On 22 May 2014 the first train had arrived at Uppal depot in Hyderabad. On 31 December 2014, Hyderabad Metro created a new technology record by successfully running a train in Automatic Train Operation (ATO) mode for the first time on Indian soil between Nagole and Mettuguda.

=== Istanbul Marmaray (TCDD E32000) ===
On November 11, 2008, Hyundai Rotem announced that it had signed a €580m contract to supply the rolling stock for the Marmaray cross-Bosporus tunnel project, later known as TCDD E32000, in Istanbul. It was chosen ahead of Alstom, CAF, and a consortium of Bombardier, Siemens, and Nurol, for the 440-car contract which was placed by the Ministry of Transport's General Directorate of Railways, Harbours & Airports.

The stainless steel cars are formed into ten-car and five-car EMUs. Some production were carried out locally by EUROTEM, Hyundai Rotem's joint venture with Turkish rolling stock manufacturer TÜVASAŞ. The trains were expected to arrive in three batches, the first 160 cars by 2011, the last by June 2014. The first EMUs went into service along Istanbul's two commuter rail lines from 2012 and 2013. On 29 October 2013, the first 5-car sets began operating between Kazlıçeşme and Ayrılıkçeşmesi as part of Phase I of the Marmaray project.

== Controversies ==
=== Boston MBTA ===
Hyundai Rotem was awarded a contract with Boston's MBTA in early 2008 for the construction of 75 cars. The contract entails the delivery of the first 4 cars by October 2010 while the remaining 71 cars were scheduled to be delivered by the end of 2012. However, due to chronic delays, shoddy workmanship, material shortage, and the death of Hyundai Rotem's chief executive, M.H. Lee, in November 2012, only four cars have been delivered by the end of 2012. On December 21, 2012, the MBTA sent a letter to Hyundai Rotem threatening to cancel the contract if a solution is not soon reached, which, would be a breach of the contract terms. Since then, the new cars have continued to experience various mechanical problems resulting in car shortages and delays. Despite this, as of 2024, the MBTA has been exercising the option to order additional train cars.

=== Ukrainian Railways HRCS2 trains ===
In December 2010, Ukrainian Railways entered into contract with Hyundai Rotem to order 10 multiple units of HRCS2 trains in preparation for the football championship UEFA Euro 2012 to transport passengers between cities that would host sporting events. The first two trains were delivered by ship to Odesa on March 11, 2012, which were than transferred to Kharkiv for acceptance testing. Six units passed their acceptance tests by June 1, 2012 and were deployed during the Euro 2012 tournament. The remaining four trains arrived around August 2012. Passenger service using these trains officially started on May 27, 2012 with Kyiv-Kharkiv and Kyiv-Lviv routes. The trains are used on a premium service introduced in Ukraine specifically for them, called Intercity and Intercity+ (Ukrainian: Інтерсіті+).

However, due to the short timeframe between entering the contract and delivery of the first trains (approximately 15 months), the trains had not undergone full-scale four-season tests, as is usually done in the railway industry. In December 2012 the trains were breaking down almost on a daily basis due to cold weather. This led to criticism by passengers and then President of Ukraine Viktor Yanukovych that the trains were bought. Hyundai Rotem offered its apologies to Ukrainian passengers, citing its "first winter in the country". The company will have its own team of engineers in Ukraine till 2018. In early October 2013 the company guaranteed "continuous operation" of the Intercity+ trains in the coming autumn and winter. However, all trains were taken out of service on February 12, 2014. Service resumed with one train set on April 29, 2014. Further rectifying works were scheduled to be completed by July 2014. After further maintenance, train performance had been stabilized. During the Russian invasion of Ukraine in 2022, these trains were one of the lifelines for maintaining adequate railway services.

In August 2024, there were reports suggesting that Ukrainian Railways intended to order 20 more train sets from Hyundai Rotem as part of their modernization of train fleet.

== See also ==
- Economy of South Korea
- Dawonsys
- Woojin Industrial Systems
- Sung Shin Rolling Stock Technology
