= Korail Class 8500 =

South Korean electric locomotive

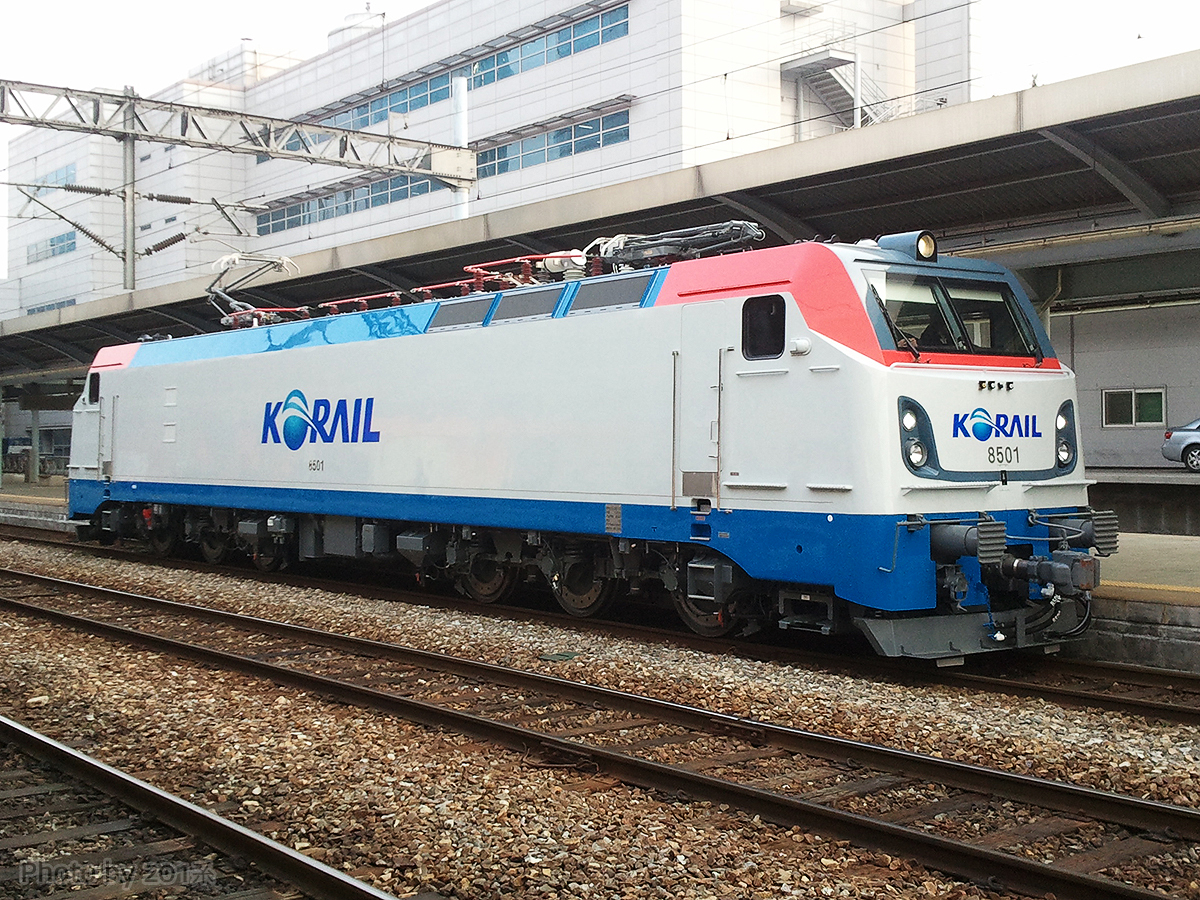
- Korail Class 8500 in Daejeon Station
Type and origin
- Power type: Electric
- Designer: Hyundai Rotem
- Builder: Hyundai Rotem
- Build date: 2012–2014
- Total produced: 87
Specifications
- Configuration
  - UIC: Co′Co′
- Gauge: 1,435 mm (4 ft 8 1/2 in) standard gauge
- Wheel diameter: 1,250 mm (4 ft 1 in)
- Length: 22,400 mm (73 ft 6 in)
- Width: 3,060 mm (10 ft 0 in)
- Height: 4,000 mm (13 ft 1 in)
- Axle load: 22 t (22 long tons; 24 short tons)
- Loco weight: 132 t (130 long tons; 146 short tons)
- Electric system/s: 25 kV AC 60 Hz
- Current pickup(s): EL-YP200S pantograph
- Loco brake: Electronically controlled, air, and regenerative
- Safety systems: ATS, ATP(Ansaldo)
Performance figures
- Maximum speed: 150 km/h (93 mph)
- Power output: 6,600 kW (8,900 hp)
- Tractive effort: 450 kN
Career
- Operators: Korail
- Class: 8500
- Numbers: 8501–8587

The Korail Class 8500 is a South Korean electric locomotive owned and operated by the Korean national railroad operator Korail, built by Hyundai Rotem. Unlike previous electric locomotive models owned by Korail, Class 8500 used traction motors supplied by Toshiba.

== Bibliography ==
- Korail (March 2012). 8500호대 전기기관차 (Report) (in Korean). Korail. Archived from the original on April 2, 2025.
