= Korail Class 8200 =

South Korean electric locomotive

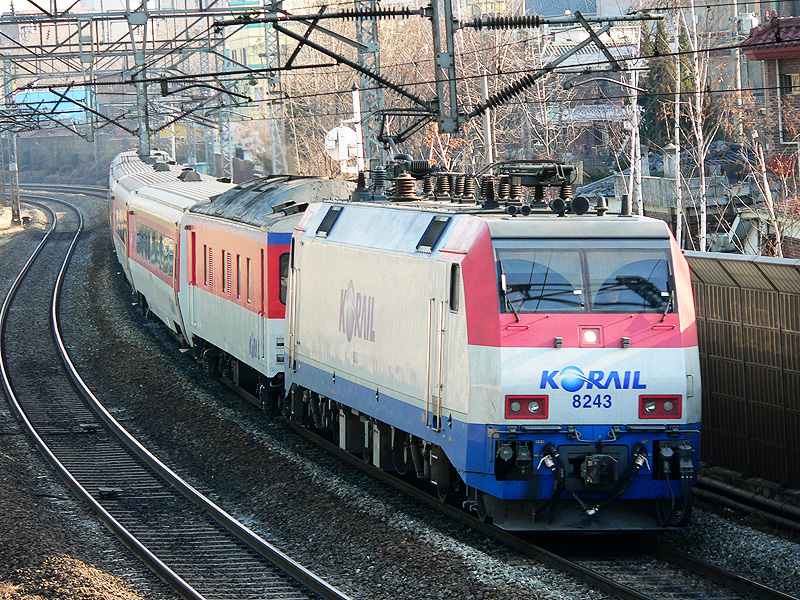
- 8243 at Singil station
Type and origin
- Power type: Electric
- Designer: Siemens Transportation Systems
- Builder: Rotem
- Build date: 2002–2008
- Total produced: 83
Specifications
- Configuration
  - AAR: B-B
  - UIC: Bo′Bo′
- Gauge: 1,435 mm (4 ft 8 1/2 in) standard gauge
- Wheel diameter: 1,250 mm (4 ft 1 1/4 in)
- Length
  - Over body: 3,860 mm (12 ft 8 in)
- Width: 3,000 mm (9 ft 10 1/8 in)
- Height: 4,470 mm (14 ft 8 in)
- Loco weight: 80 tonnes (78.74 long tons; 88.18 short tons)
- Electric system/s: 25 kV 60 Hz AC Catenary
- Current pickup: Pantograph
- Loco brake: Electronically controlled, air, and regenerative
- Safety systems: ATS, ATP
Performance figures
- Maximum speed: 150 km/h (93 mph); 220 km/h (137 mph) (with higher gear ratio)
- Power output: 5,200 kW (7,000 hp)
- Tractive effort
  - Starting: 330 kN (34 tf)
Career
- Operators: Korail
- Class: 8200
- Numbers: 8201–8283

The Korail Class 8200 is a South Korean electric locomotive operated by Korail. This locomotive has head-end power capabilities in place of a dynamo car, which could be used with up to 12 passenger cars.

== Technical details ==
This locomotive is based on the Siemens EuroSprinter model ES64F, assembled by Rotem. With four 1300 kW electric motors, the total power output is 5200 kW. The maximum speed is 150 km/h, although changing the bogies would allow 220 km/h.

== Running lines ==
After the introduction of the 8200, Korail made a trial run in Chungbuk Line, which had just been electrified. After electrifying several lines such as Jungang, Taebaek, Gyeongbu, Yeongdong and Honam Line, it is used for Mugunghwa trains with a maximum speed of 150 km/h.

== HEP Issues ==
The head-end power feature of 8200s has caused some problems in Korea. Power generated by regenerative brake has limits, and if the locomotive has many carriages, the head-end power supply will be insufficient. Because of this problem, a dynamo car is attached when operating with 5 or more passenger cars in case of emergency.

== Bibliography ==
- Siemens Mobility (2008). Locomotives Reference List (Report). Erlangen, Munich: Siemens AG.
- Korail (March 2012). 8500호대 전기기관차 (Report) (in Korean). Korail.
