= Juan National Industrial Complex station =

Metro station in Incheon, South Korea

I217 주안국가산단 (인천J밸리) Juan National Industrial Complex (Incheon J Valley)
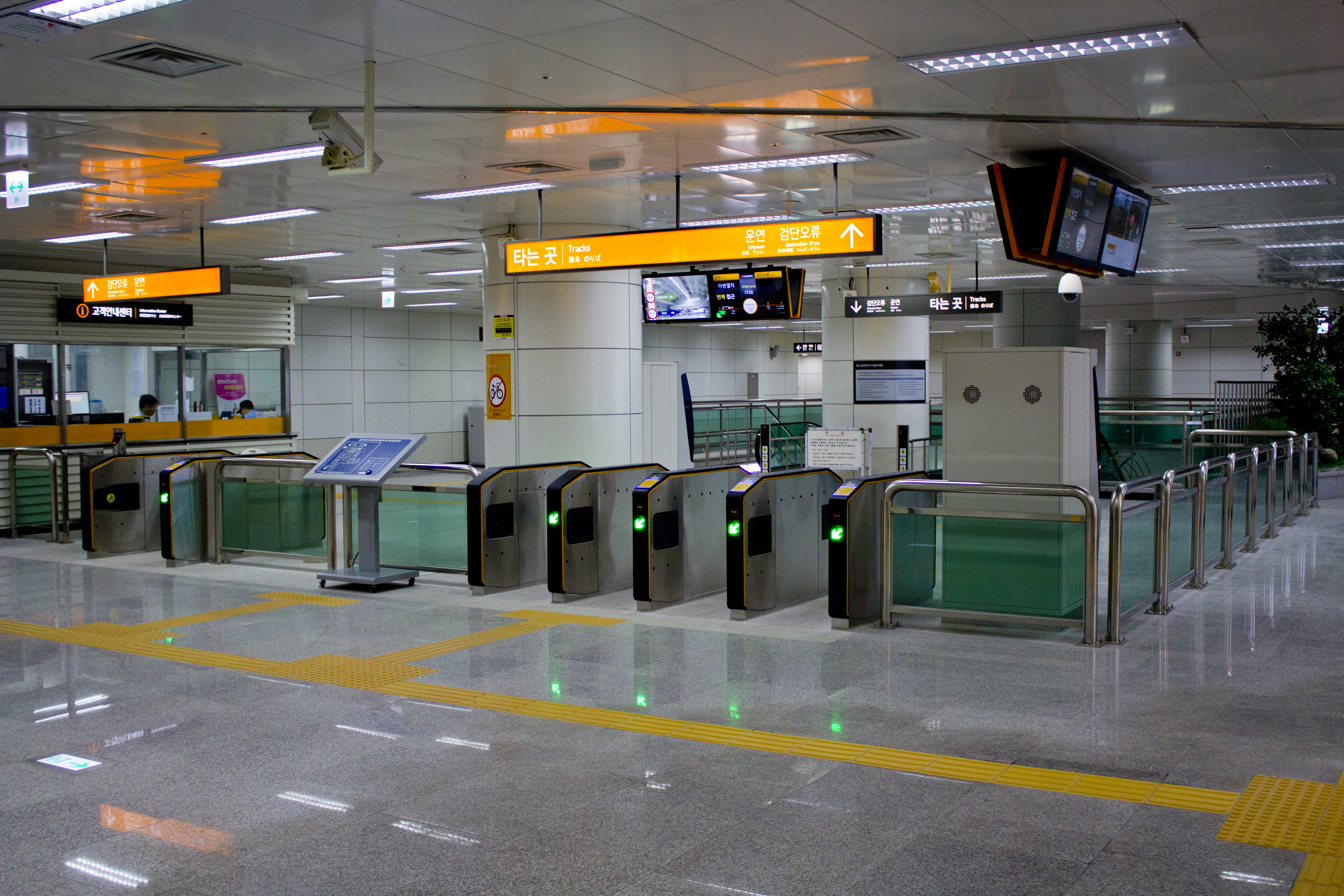

Korean name
- Hangul: 주안국가산단역
- Hanja: 朱安國家産團驛
- Revised Romanization: Juan gukga sandan yeok
- McCune–Reischauer: Chuan kukka sandan yŏk

General information
- Location: 606-11 Gajwa-dong, Seohae District, Incheon
- Coordinates: 37°28′26″N 126°40′45″E
- Operator: Incheon Transit Corporation
- Line: Incheon Line 2
- Platforms: 2
- Tracks: 2

Key dates
- July 30, 2016: Incheon Line 2 opened
Location

Juan National Industrial Complex Station is a subway station on Line 2 of the Incheon Subway.

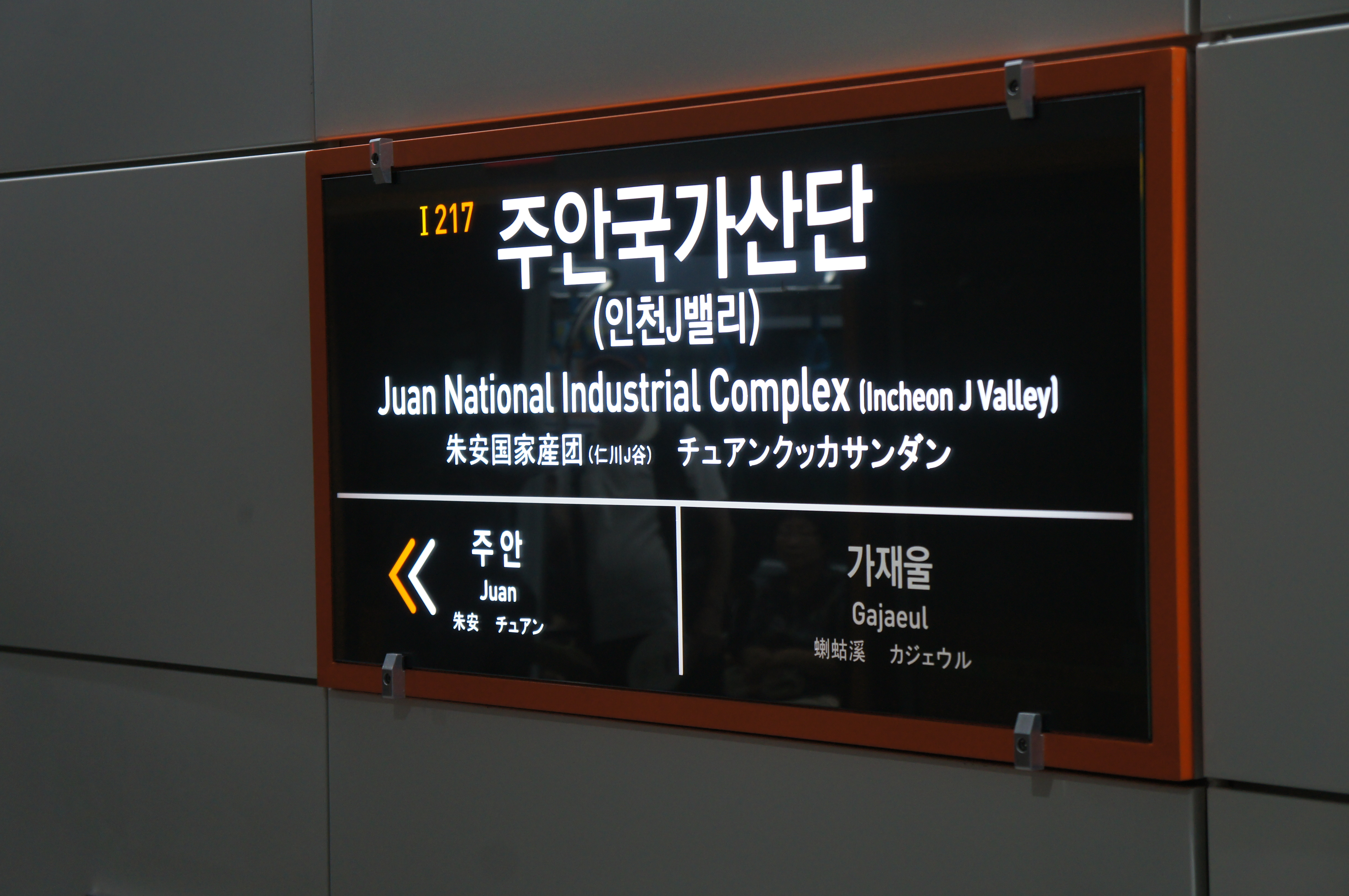

Preceding station	Incheon Subway	Following station
Gajaeul towards Geomdan Oryu	Incheon Line 2	Juan towards Unyeon
