= Geombawi station =

Metro station in Incheon, South Korea

I208 검바위 Geombawi
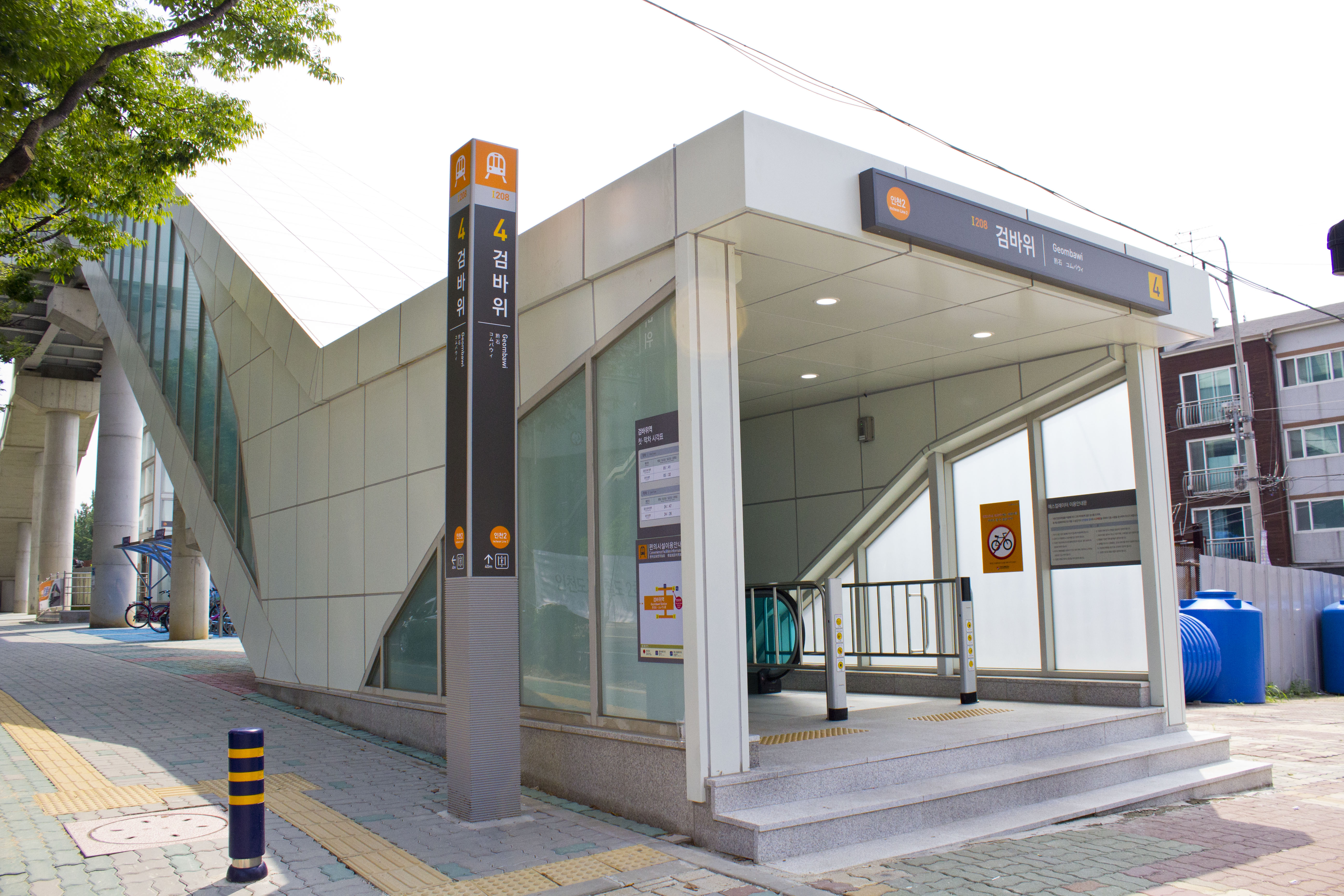
- Exit 4 of Geombawi station in July 2016

Korean name
- Hangul: 검바위역
- Hanja: 黔바위驛
- Revised Romanization: Geombawi yeok
- McCune–Reischauer: Kŏmbawi yŏk

General information
- Location: 72-15 Geomam-dong, Seohae District, Incheon
- Coordinates: 37°33′40″N 126°40′39″E
- Operator: Incheon Transit Corporation
- Line: Incheon Line 2
- Platforms: 2
- Tracks: 2

Key dates
- July 30, 2016: Incheon Line 2 opened
Location

Geombawi Station is a subway station on Line 2 of the Incheon Subway.

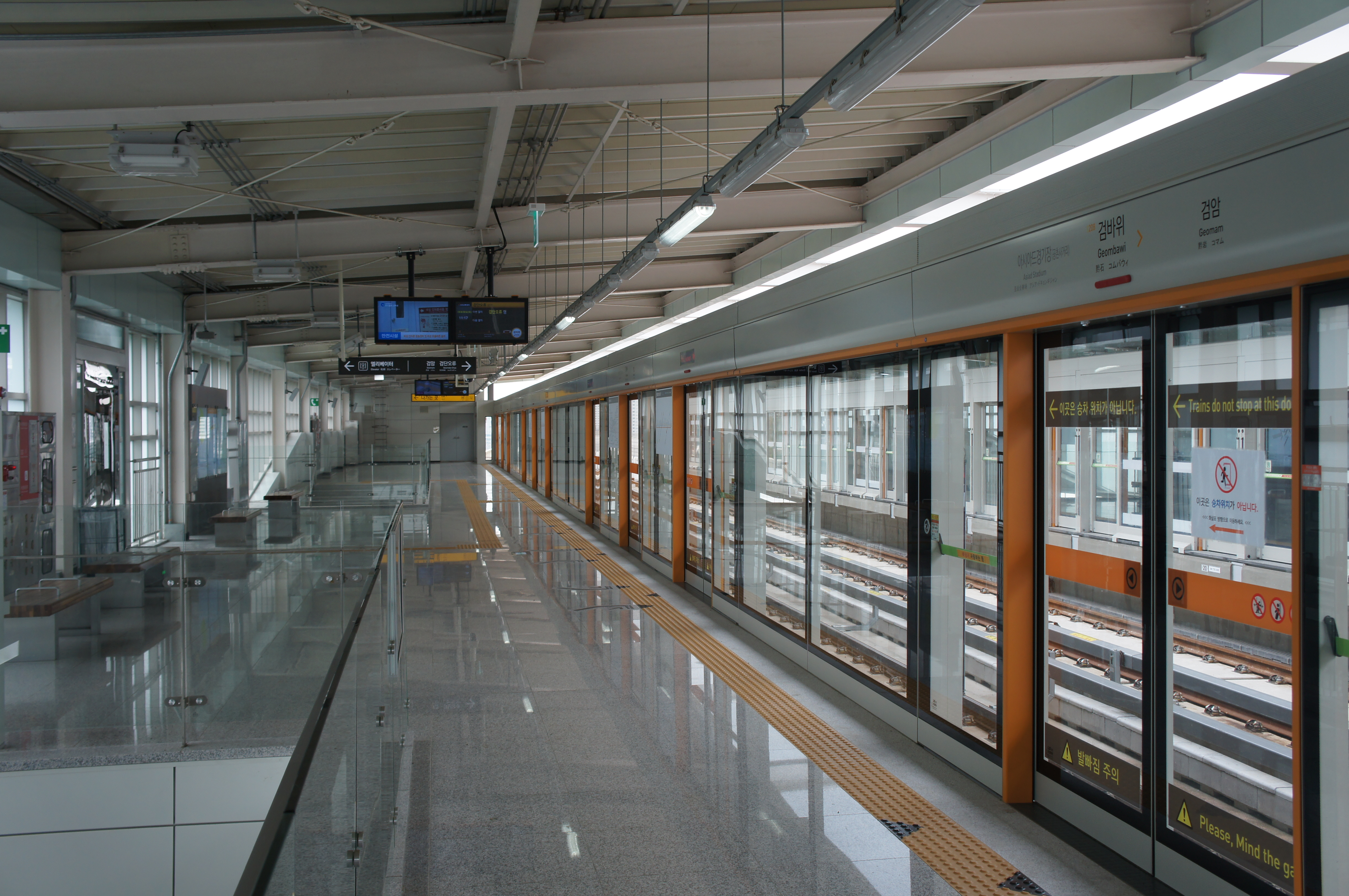
Station platform

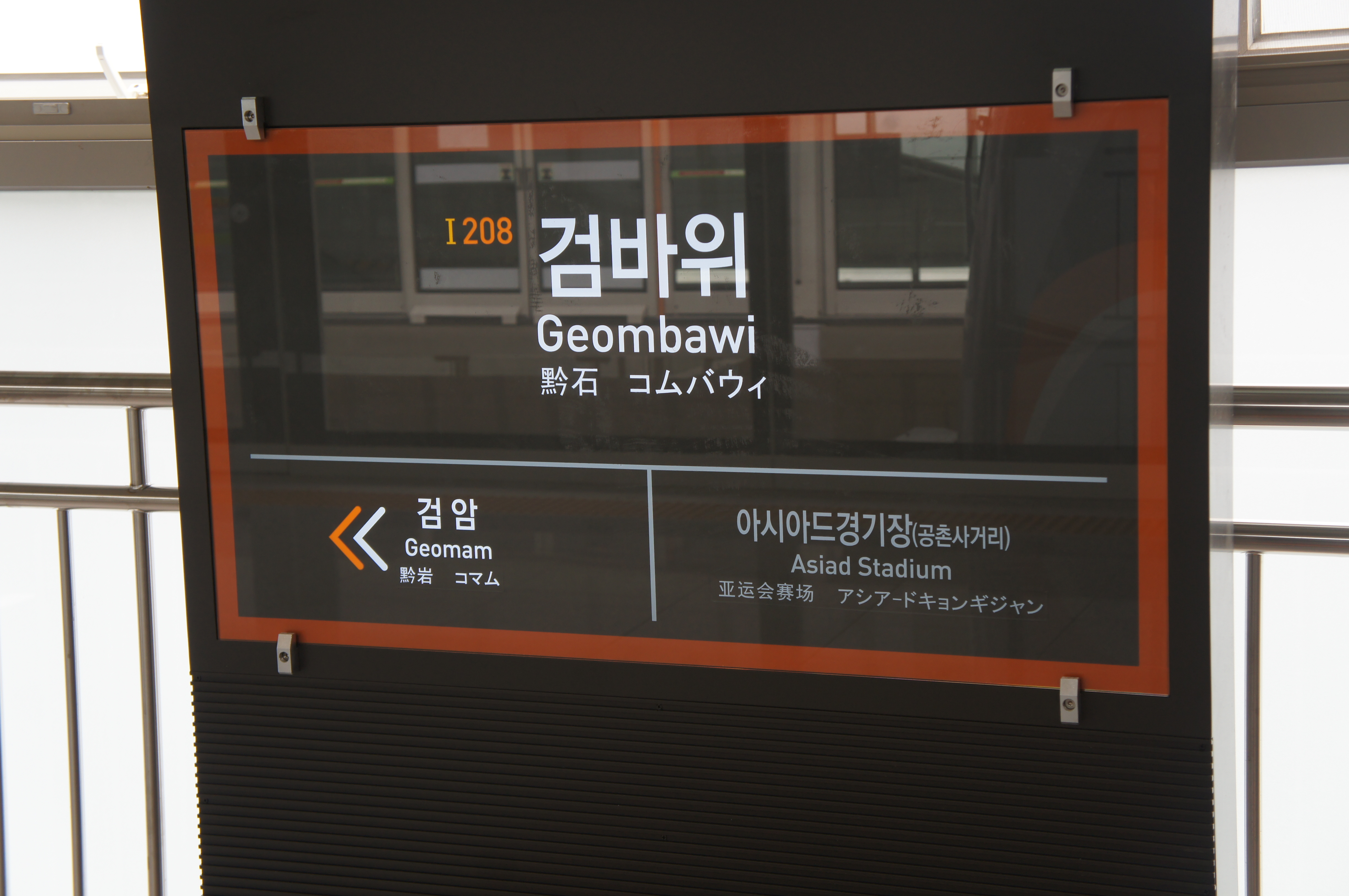
Station nameplate

Preceding station	Incheon Subway	Following station
Geomam towards Geomdan Oryu	Incheon Line 2	Asiad Stadium towards Unyeon
