= Gajaeul station =

Metro station in Incheon, South Korea

I216 가재울 Gajaeul
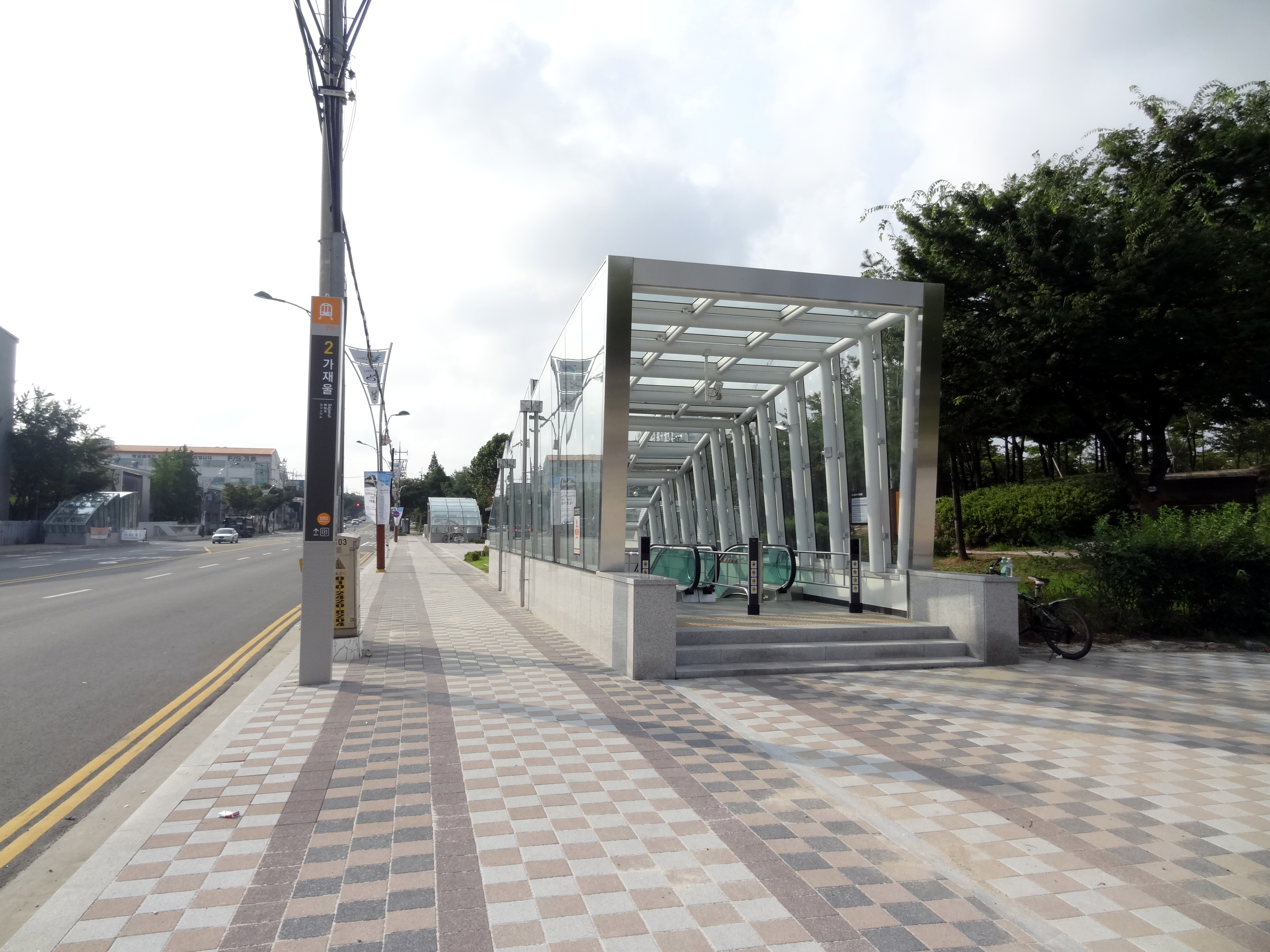
- Exit 2 of Gajaeul Station

Korean name
- Hangul: 가재울역
- Hanja: 가재울驛
- Revised Romanization: Gajaeul-yeok
- McCune–Reischauer: Kajaeul-yŏk

General information
- Location: 288 Gajwa-dong, Seohae District, Incheon
- Coordinates: 37°29′03″N 126°41′02″E
- Operator: Incheon Transit Corporation
- Line: Incheon Line 2
- Platforms: 2
- Tracks: 2

Key dates
- July 30, 2016: Incheon Line 2 opened
Location

Gajaeul Station is a subway station on Line 2 of the Incheon Subway.

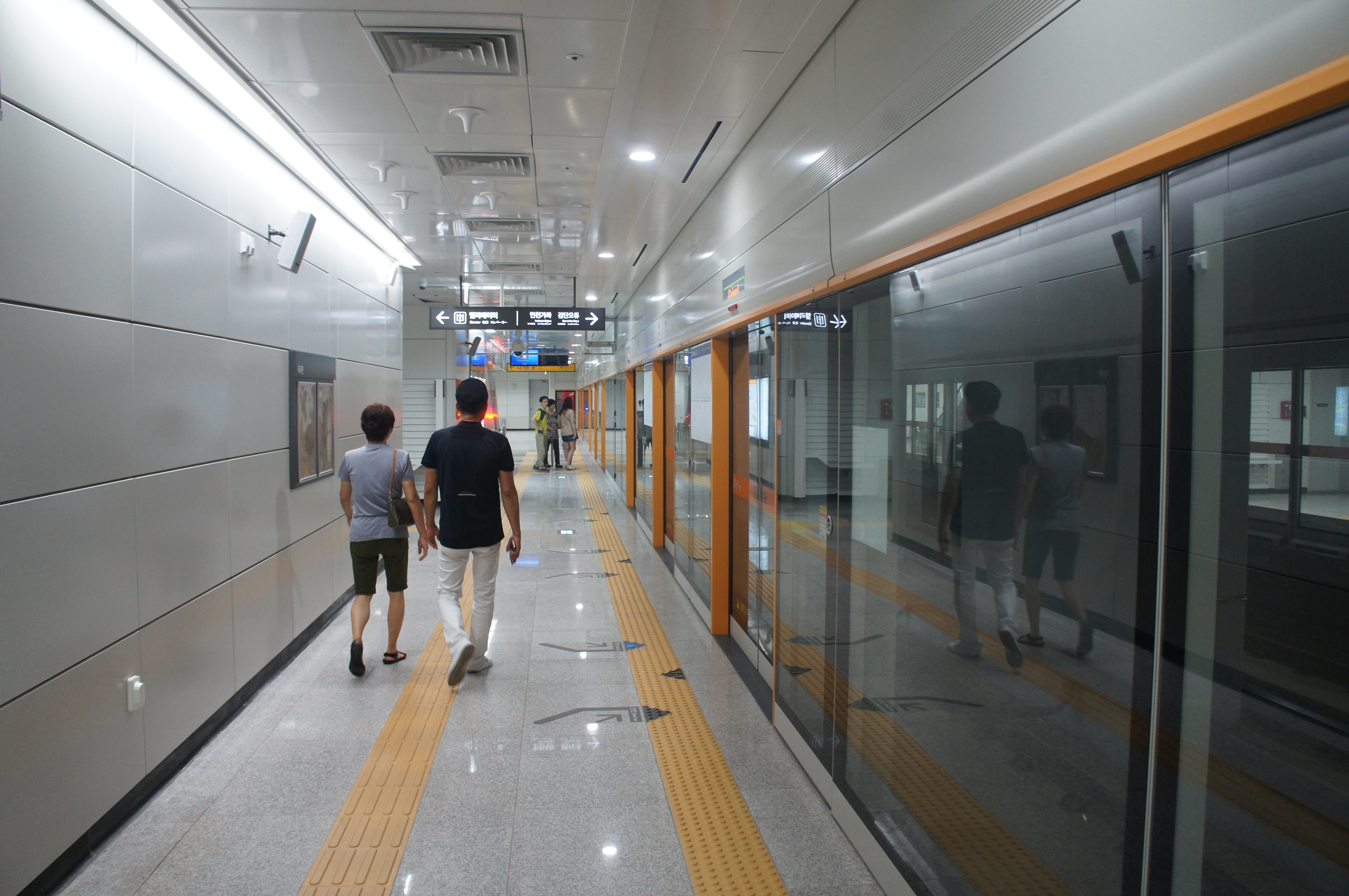
Station platform

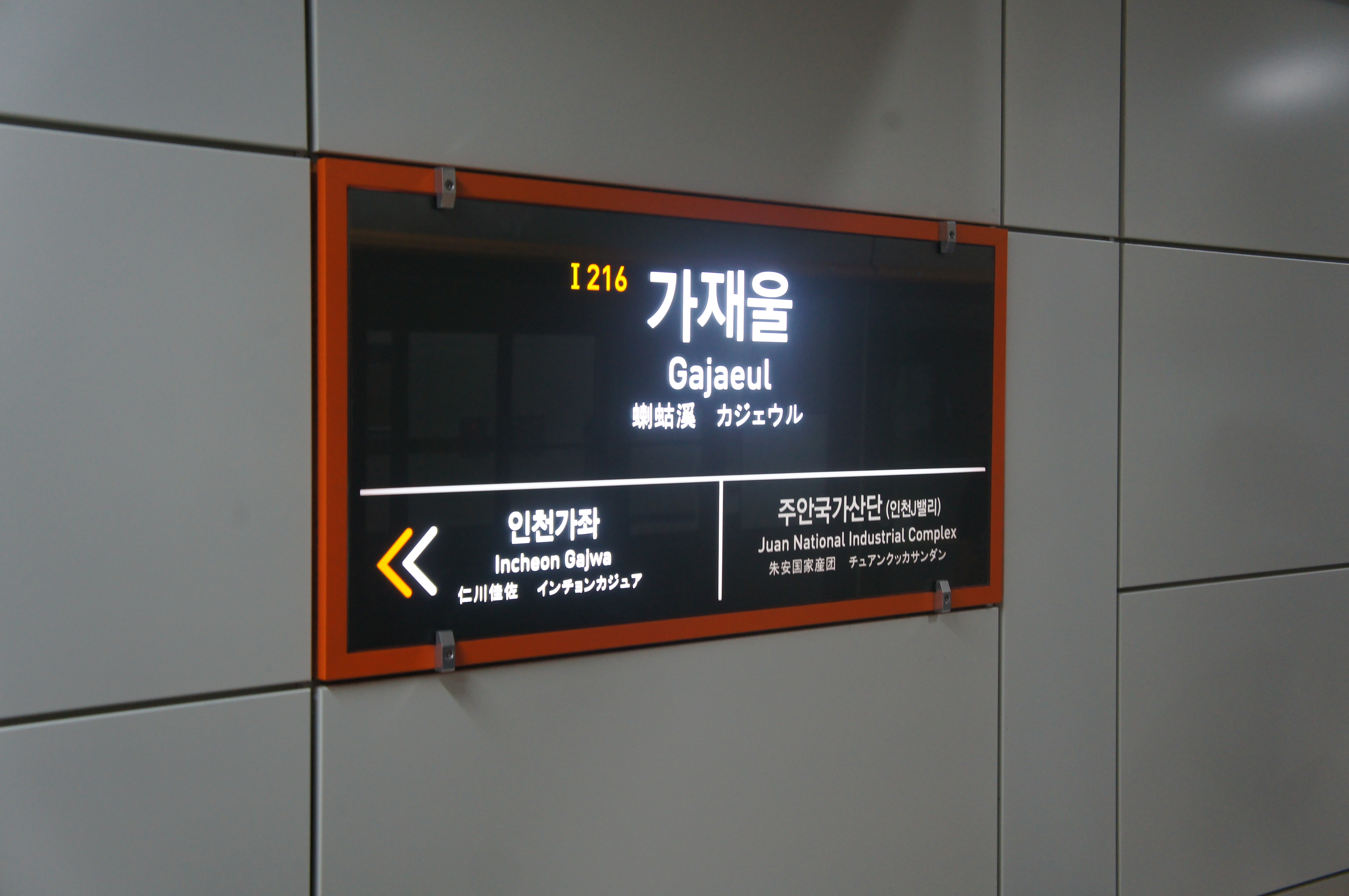
Station nameplate

| Preceding station | Incheon Subway | Following station |
|---|---|---|
| Incheon Gajwa towards Geomdan Oryu | Incheon Line 2 | Juan National Industrial Complex towards Unyeon |
