= Incheon City Hall station =

Metro station in Incheon, South Korea

I124 I221 인천시청 (연세와병원) Incheon City Hall (Yonsei Wa Hospital)
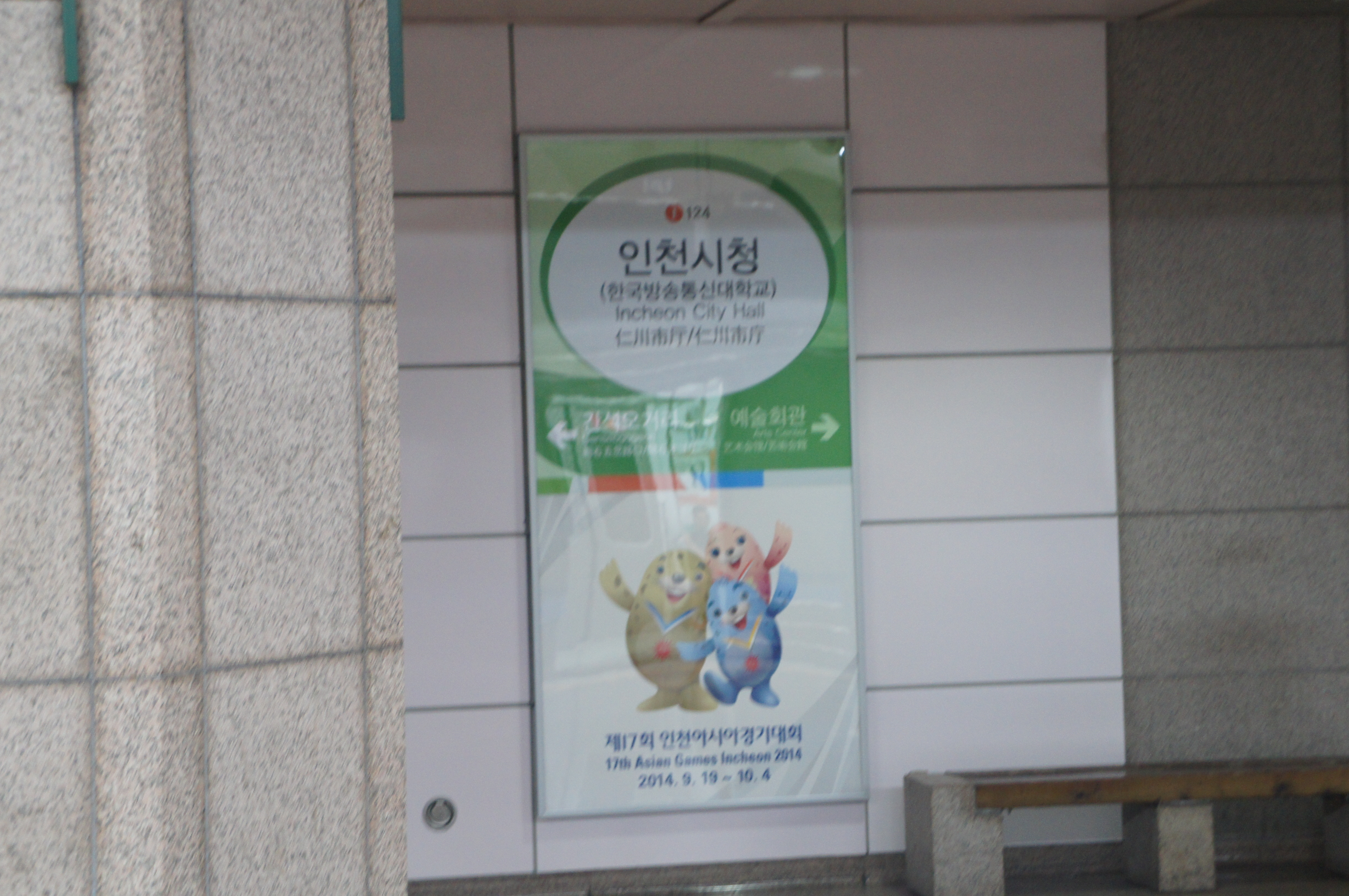

Korean name
- Hangul: 인천시청역
- Hanja: 仁川市廳驛
- Revised Romanization: Incheon-sicheong-yeok
- McCune–Reischauer: Inch'ŏn-sich'ŏng-yŏk

General information
- Other names: Yonsei Wa Hospital
- Location: 927 Ganseok-dong, Jiha264, Yesullo, Namdong-gu, Incheon
- Coordinates: 37°27′26″N 126°42′08″E
- Operator: Incheon Transit Corporation
- Lines: Incheon Line 1 Incheon Line 2
- Platforms: 2
- Tracks: 2

Construction
- Structure type: Underground

Key dates
- October 6, 1999: Incheon Line 1 opened
- July 30, 2016: Incheon Line 2 opened

Services
Preceding station	Incheon Subway	Following station
Ganseogogeori towards Geomdan Lake Park	Incheon Line 1	Culture & Arts Center towards Songdo Moonlight Festival Park
Seokbawi Market towards Geomdan Oryu	Incheon Line 2	Seokcheon Sageori towards Unyeon
Location

Incheon City Hall station (Korean: 인천시청역) is a subway station on Line 1 and Line 2 of the Incheon Subway located in Namdong District, Incheon, South Korea.

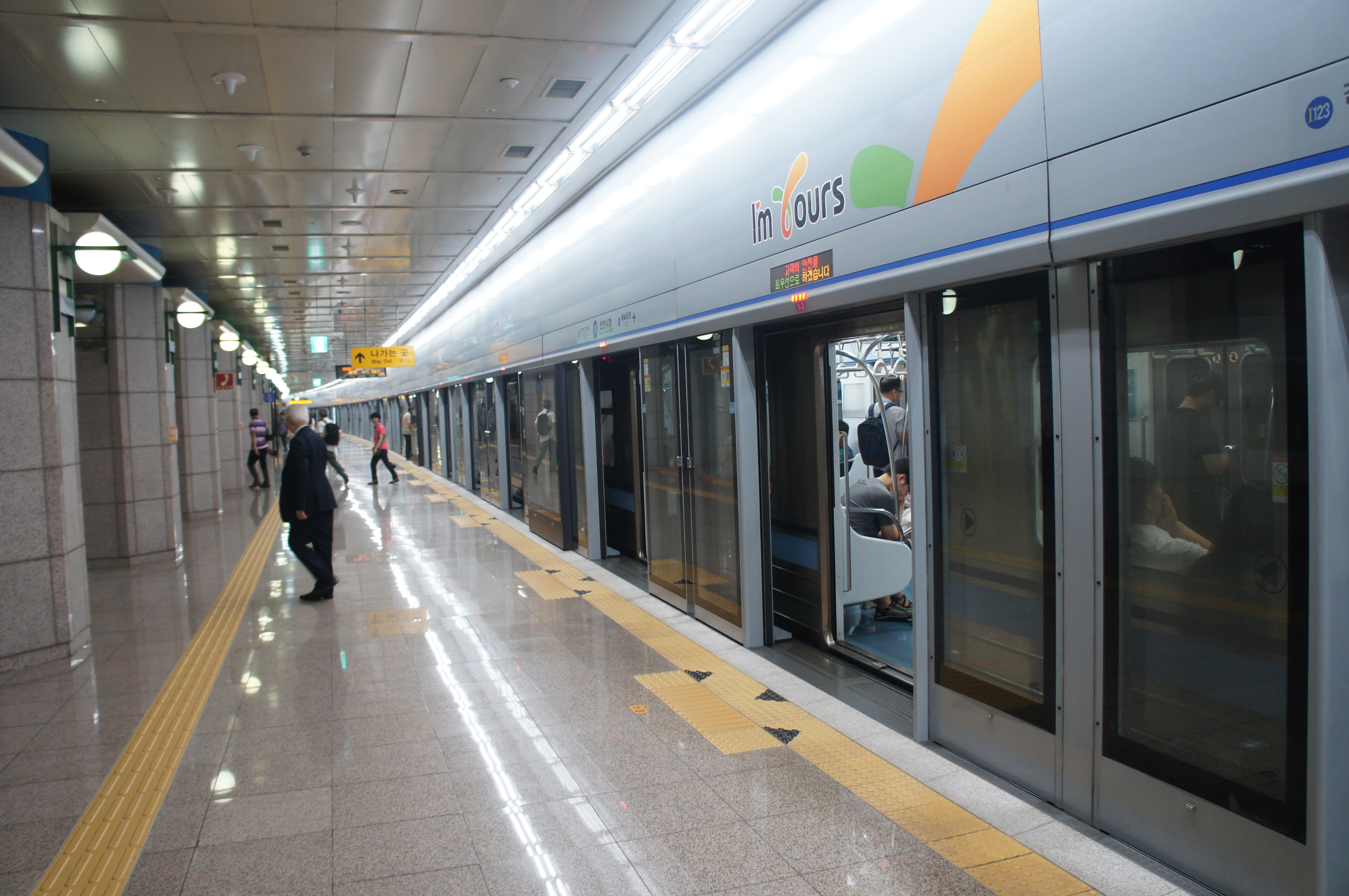
Incheon Line 1 platform

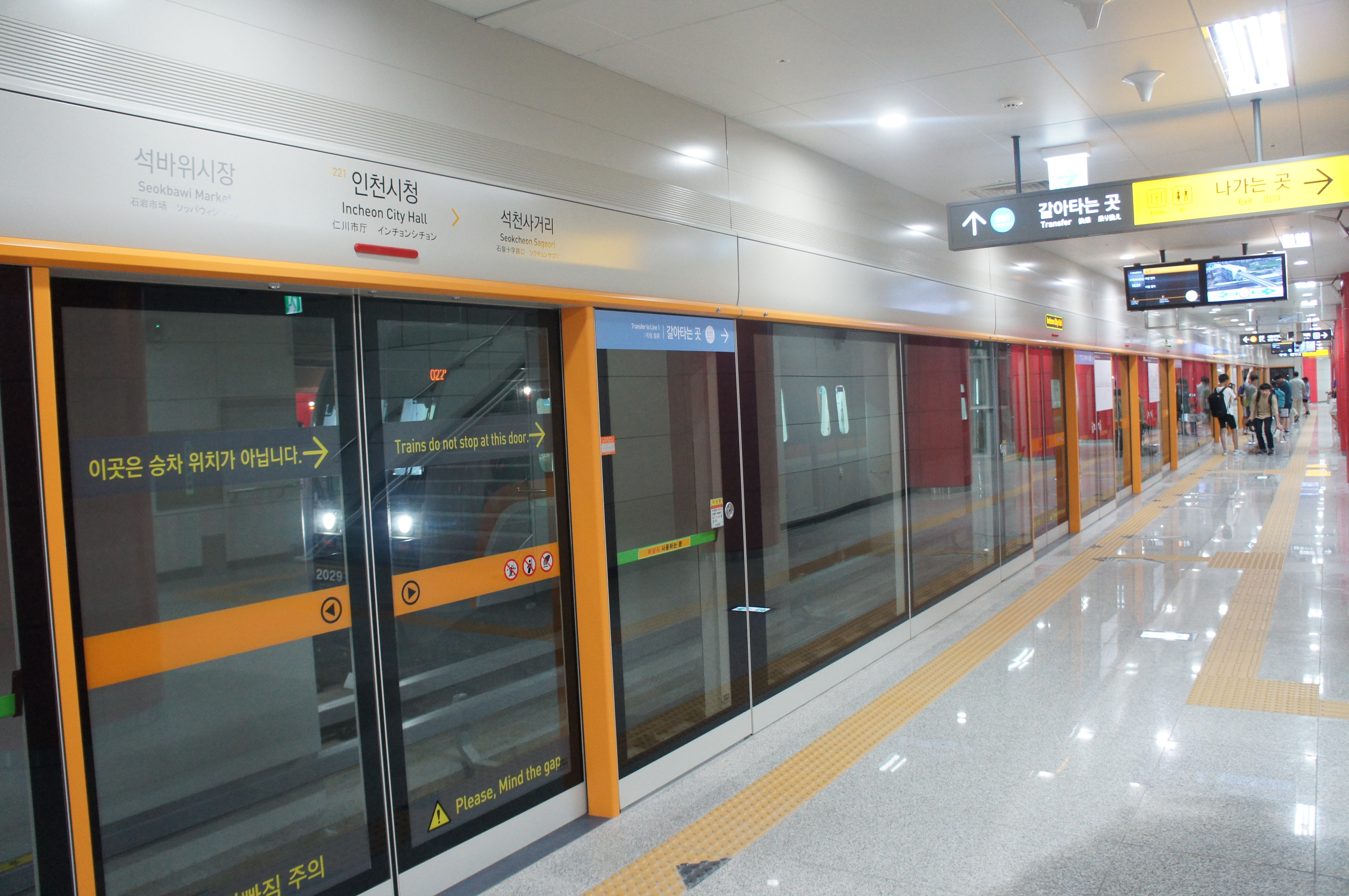
Incheon Line 2 platform

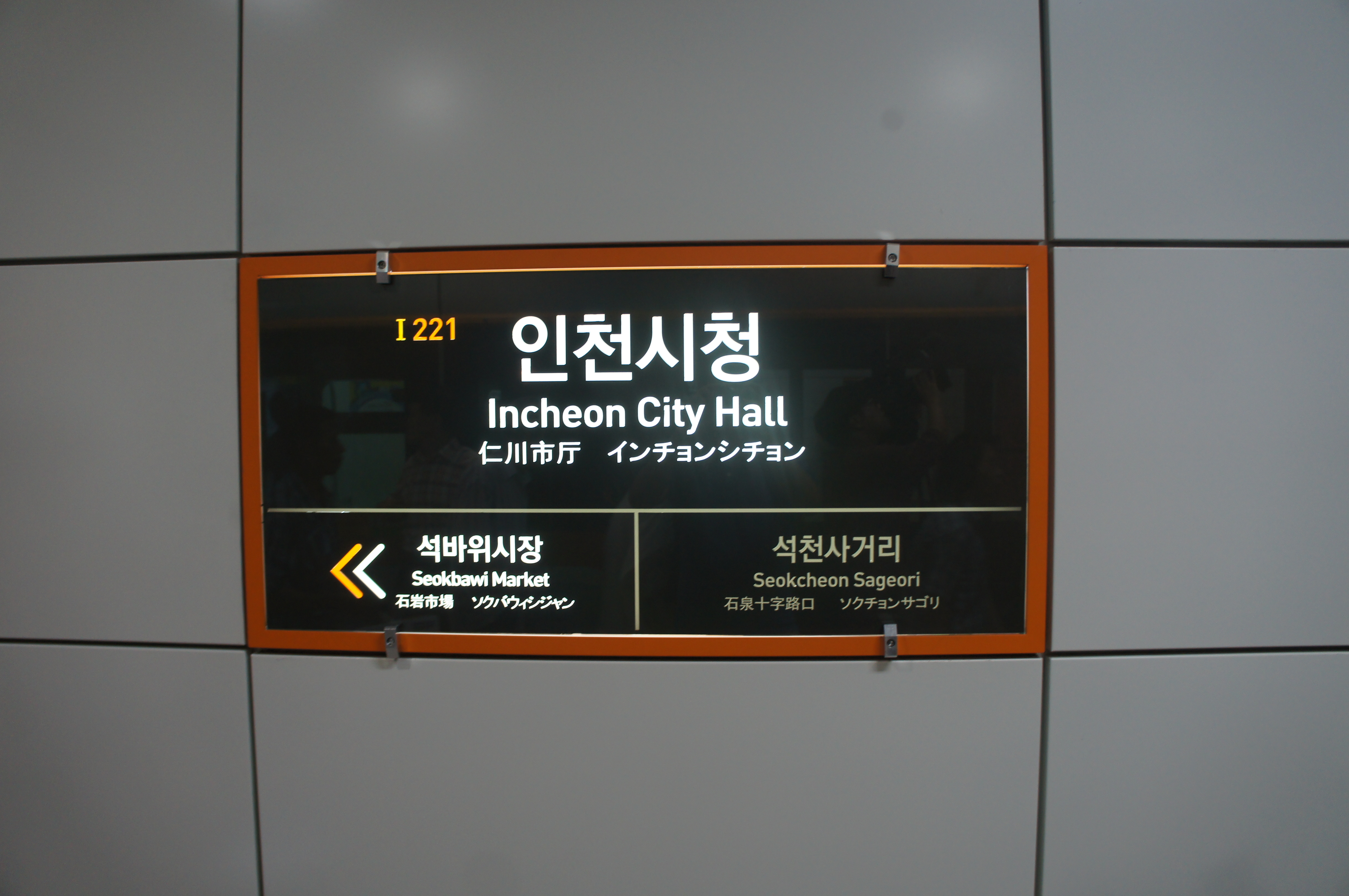
Incheon Line 2 station nameplate

== Station layout ==
G	Street Level	Exits
L1	Concourse	Faregates, Ticketing Machines, Station Control
Line 1 Platforms	Side platform, doors will open on the right
Line 1 Platforms	Westbound	← Incheon Line 1 toward Geomdan Lake Park (Ganseogogeori)
Line 1 Platforms	Eastbound	→ Incheon Line 1 toward Songdo Moonlight Festival Park (Culture & Arts Center) →
Line 1 Platforms	Side platform, doors will open on the right
Line 2 Platforms	Side platform, doors will open on the right
Line 2 Platforms	Westbound	← Incheon Line 2 toward Geomdan Oryu (Seokbawi Market)
Line 2 Platforms	Eastbound	→ Incheon Line 2 toward Unyeon (Seokcheon Sageori) →
Line 2 Platforms	Side platform, doors will open on the right

== Exits ==
Exit No.	Image	Destinations
1		Ganseok-1-dong office Incheon art high school
2		Deoksan apartment
3		Seohae apartment
4		Incheon City Hall; Guwol middle school Seokcheon elementary school Joongang public library Gacheongil hospital
5		Incheon Education Office; Joongang public library Gacheongil hospital CGV; Homever
6		Sang Incheong girls' middle school Dong Incheon middle school Joongang park
7		Hangook Bangsong Tongsin University; Joongang park
8		Joongang park
9		Nam Incheon post office Joongang park
