= Seokbawi Market station =

Metro station in Incheon, South Korea

I220 석바위시장 Seokbawi Market
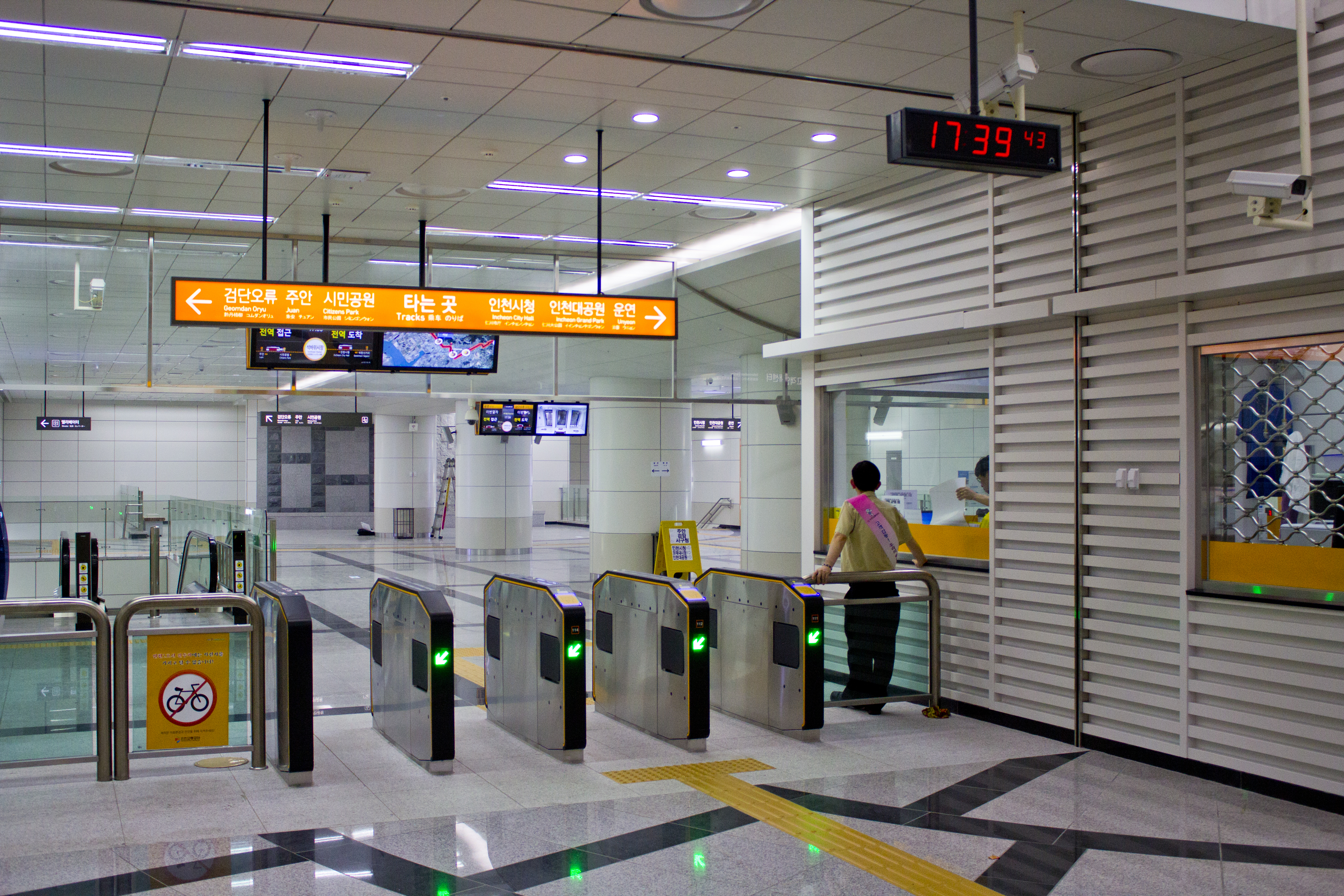

Korean name
- Hangul: 석바위시장역
- Hanja: 石바위市場驛
- Revised Romanization: Seokbawi sijang yeok
- McCune–Reischauer: Sŏkpawi sijang yŏk

General information
- Location: 1597 Juan-dong, Michuhol District, Incheon
- Coordinates: 37°27′28″N 126°41′33″E
- Operator: Incheon Transit Corporation
- Line: Incheon Line 2
- Platforms: 2
- Tracks: 2

Key dates
- July 30, 2016: Incheon Line 2 opened
Location

Seokbawi Market Station is a subway station on Line 2 of the Incheon Subway.

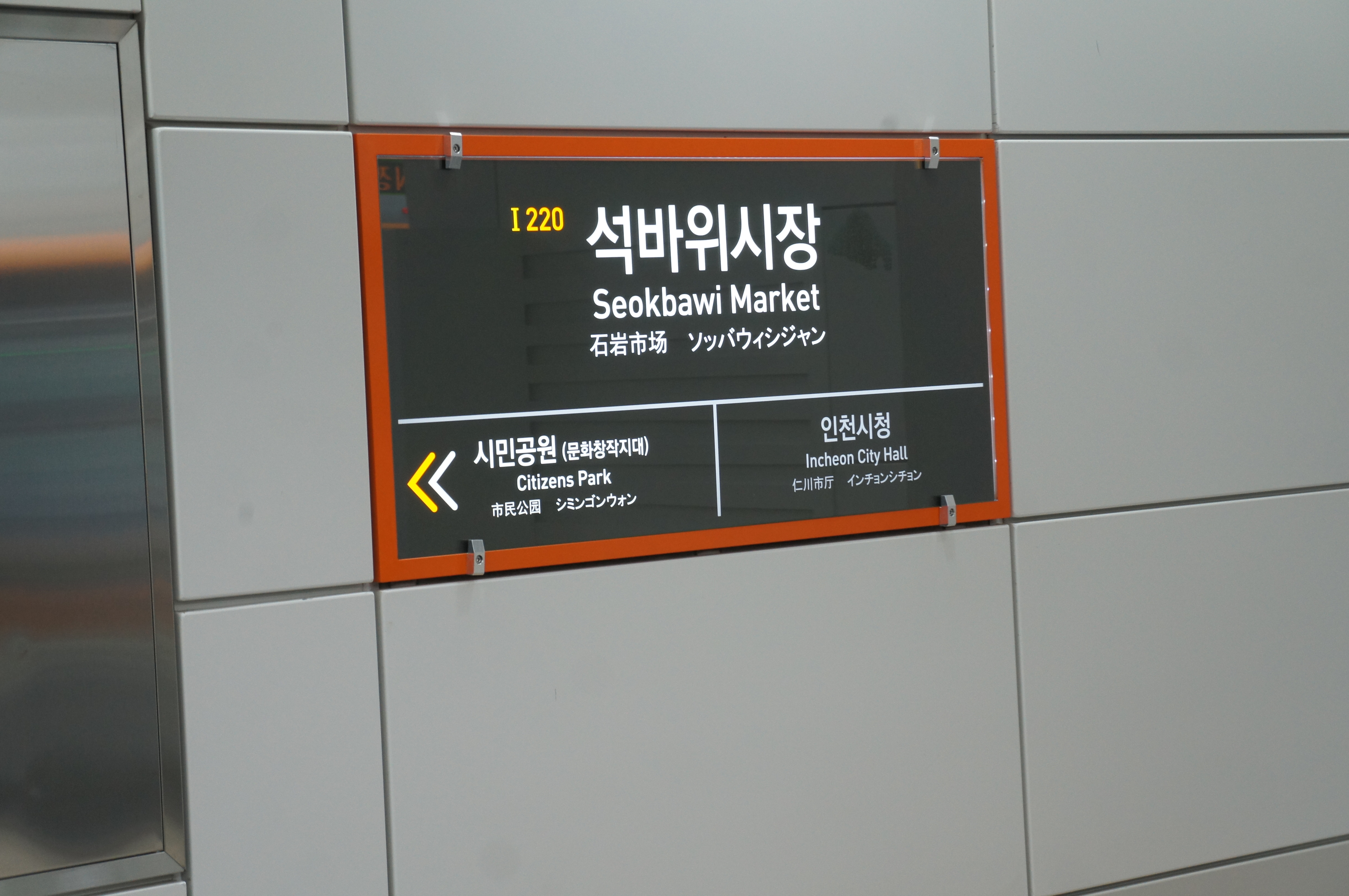

Preceding station	Incheon Subway	Following station
Citizens Park towards Geomdan Oryu	Incheon Line 2	Incheon City Hall towards Unyeon
