= Juan station =

Metro station in Incheon, South Korea

Coordinates: 37.46486°N 126.68021°E

주안 (인천사랑병원); Juan (Incheon Sarang Hospital)
I218
주안 (인천사랑병원)
Juan
(Incheon Sarang Hospital)
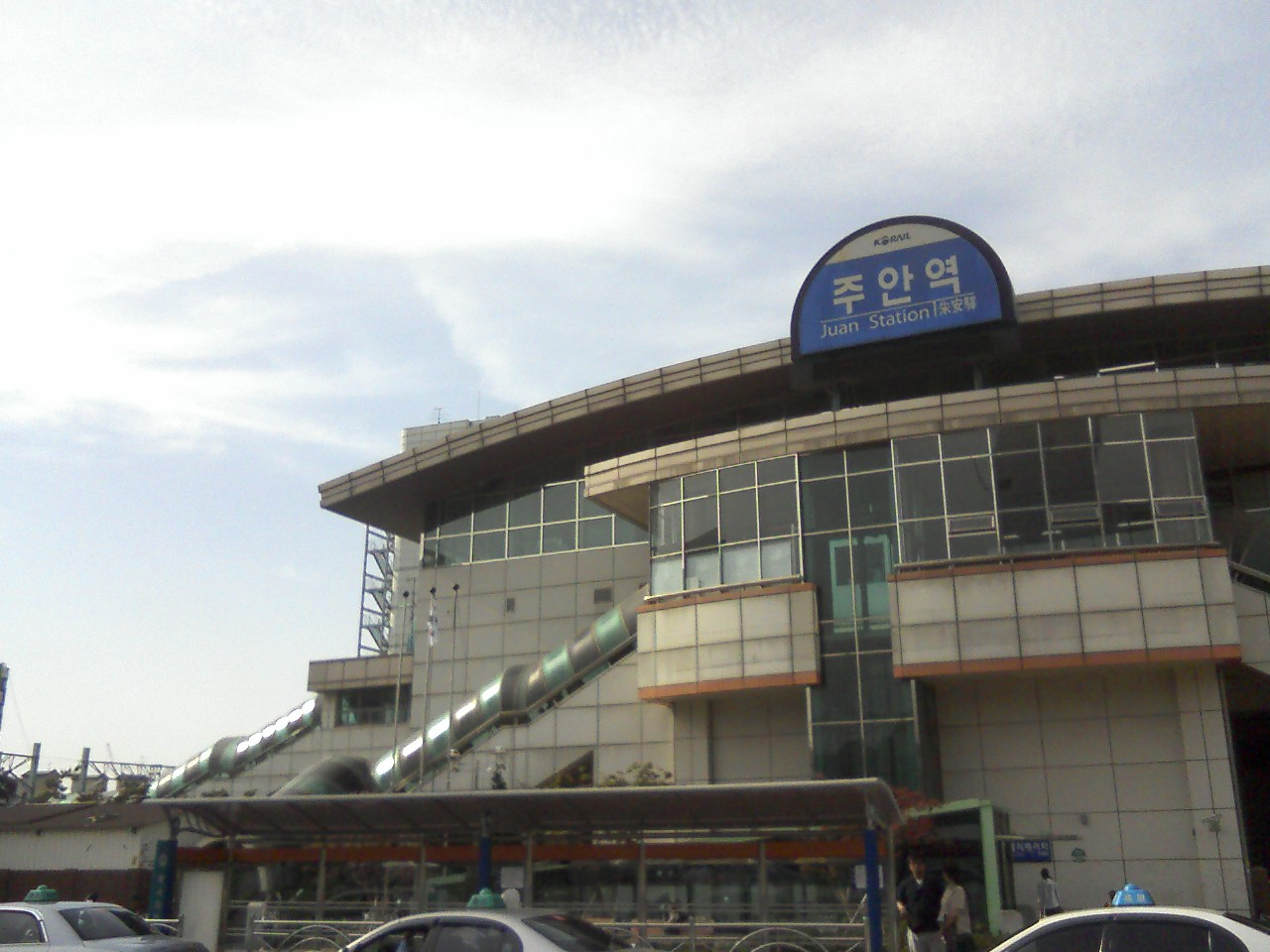
- Juan station

Korean name
- Hangul: 주안역
- Hanja: 朱安驛
- RR: Juan-yeok
- MR: Chuan-yŏk

General information
- Location: 125 Juan 5-dong, 95-19 Juanno, Michuhol-gu, Incheon
- Operator: Korail; Incheon Transit Corporation
- Lines: Line 1 Incheon Line 2
- Platforms: 4
- Tracks: 6

Construction
- Structure type: Aboveground/Underground

History
- Opened: September 18, 1899

Key dates
- 15 Aug 1974: Line 1 opened
- July 30, 2016: Incheon Line 2 opened

Passengers
- (Daily) Based on Jan-Dec of 2012. Line 1: 64,419
Location

Juan station (Korean: 주안역; Hanja: 朱安驛; RR: Juan-yeok) is a subway station on the Seoul Metropolitan Subway Line 1 and Incheon Subway Line 2. This station receives the second-highest number of crowds along the entire Incheon line due to its proximity to the downtown area. It is also near Inha University and Inha Technical College.

== History ==
On September 18, 1899, after the opening of the Gyeongin Line, which signaled the start of Korean railways, the operation began with the establishment of Juan Station on October 21, 1910. After the opening of the Gyeongin Line double track and the opening of the metropolitan subway, a new onboard station was built in 1978, and an underground station was completed in 1989. It is a two-story shipboard station with a reinforced concrete slab roof with an ancillary building of 25.7 square meters on a scale of 549.7 square meters. In 2016, Incheon Metro Line 2 was opened and became a transfer station. As it is located in the center of Incheon, it is characterized not only by its proximity to public facilities and commercial days, but also by a well-developed transportation network such as roads and buses.

== Entrance ==
- Exit 1 : Juan 1-dong, Inha University, Inha Technical College.
- Exit 2 : MMA (Body Counselor), Incheon District Court, Juan Park.
- Exit 3 : Juan 5-dong, North-Juan Elementary School.
- Exit 4 : Juan 5-dong Community Service Center. Ganseok 4-dong.
- It has a double-island platform with two sides and four tracks, and all platforms have screen doors. There are four exits. The shipboard station (Bupyeong direction) leads to the bus transfer center (Juan Station Plaza), and the underground station has one exit toward the northern station and three exits toward the southern station. There is a Subong Library automatic book machine in the shipboard station.

== Passengers ==
According to the data, there is a rapid reduction of using passengers. It is believed to cause those situations after operation of metropolitan buses system.

Station	Figure								
Station	2000	2001	2002	2003	2004	2005	2006	2007	2008
Line 1	33915	35356	38782	41651	31347	31103	29853	30079	30257

== Gallery ==
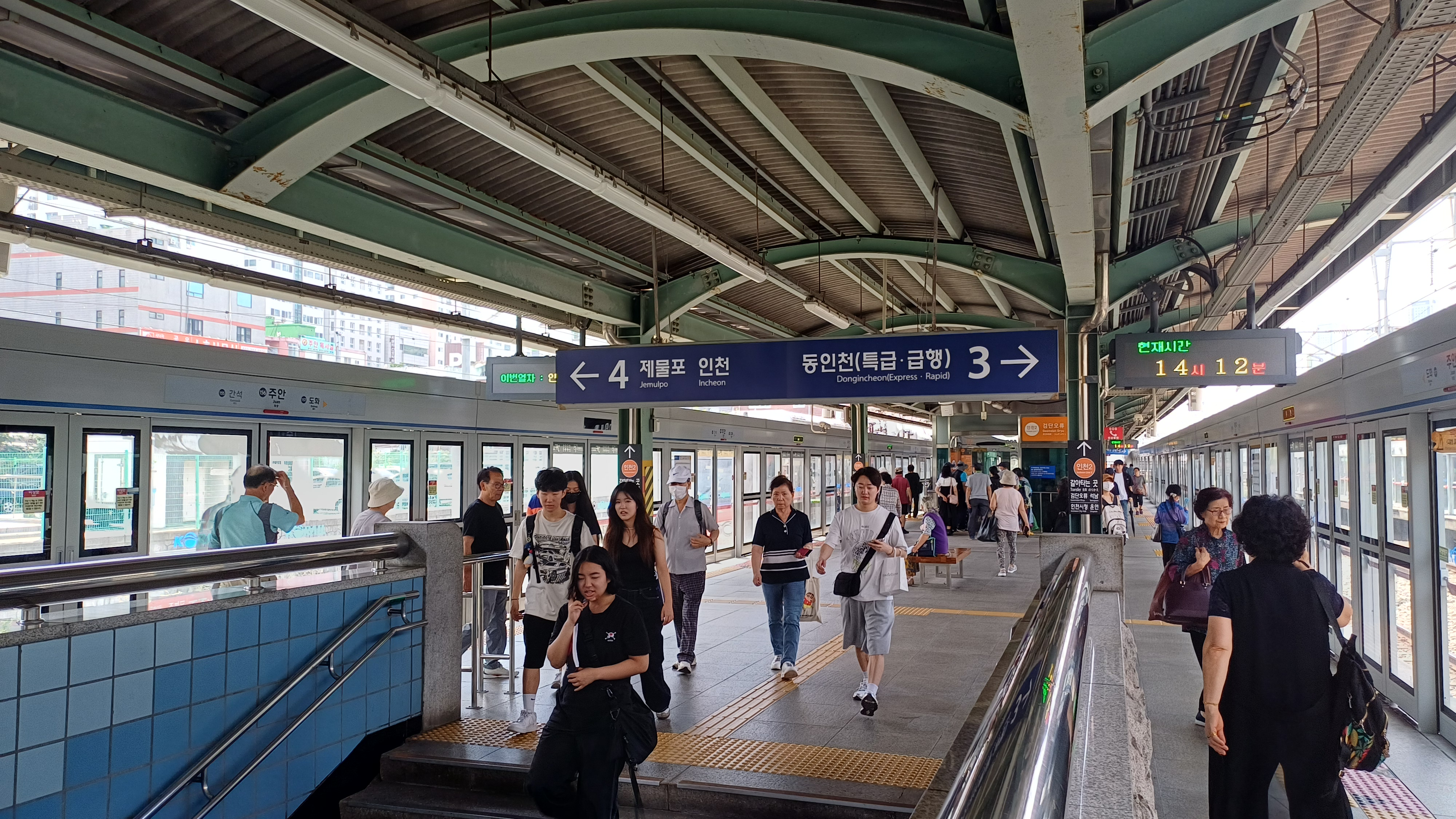
Seoul Line 1 platforms

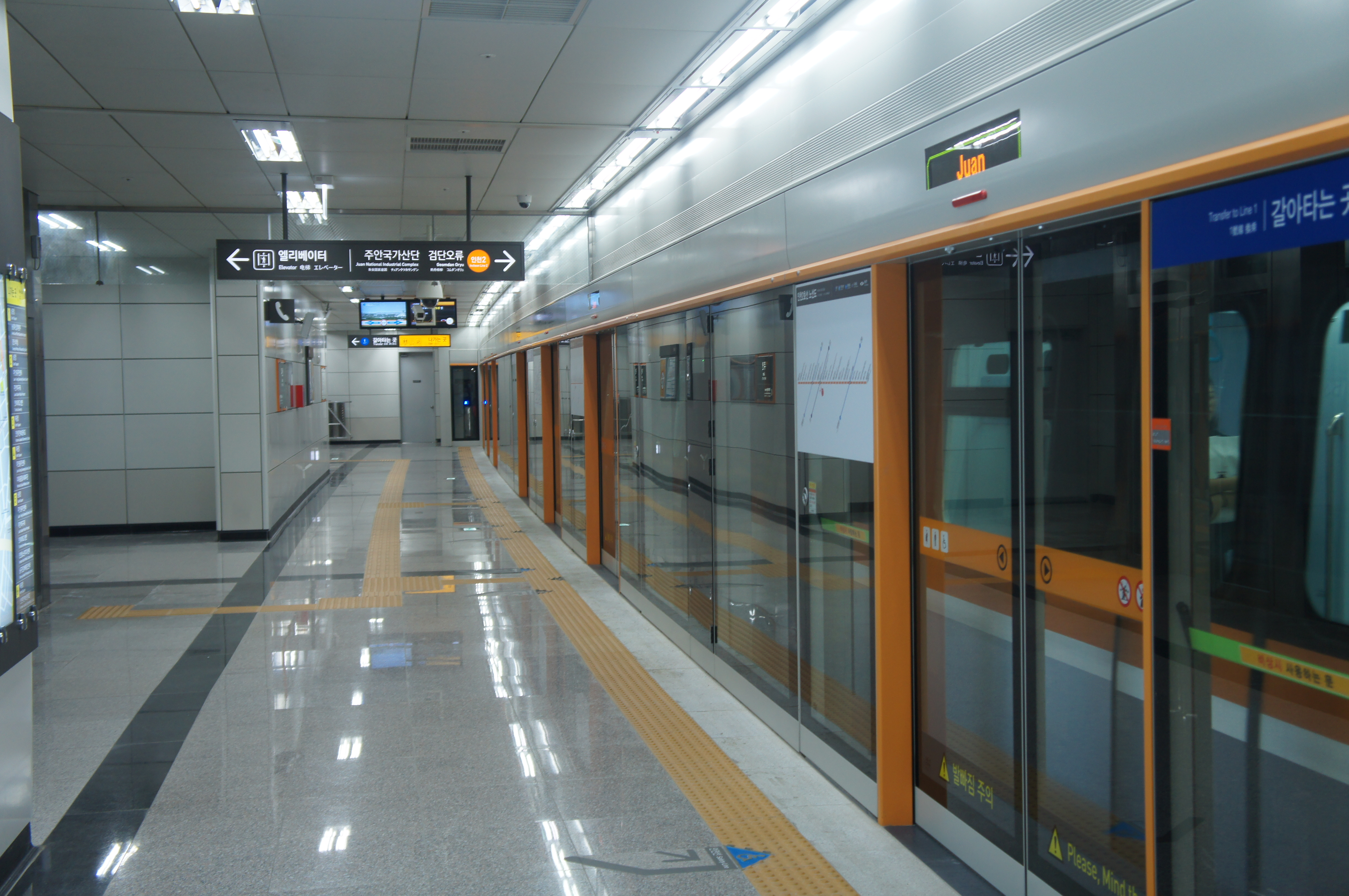
Incheon Line 2 platform

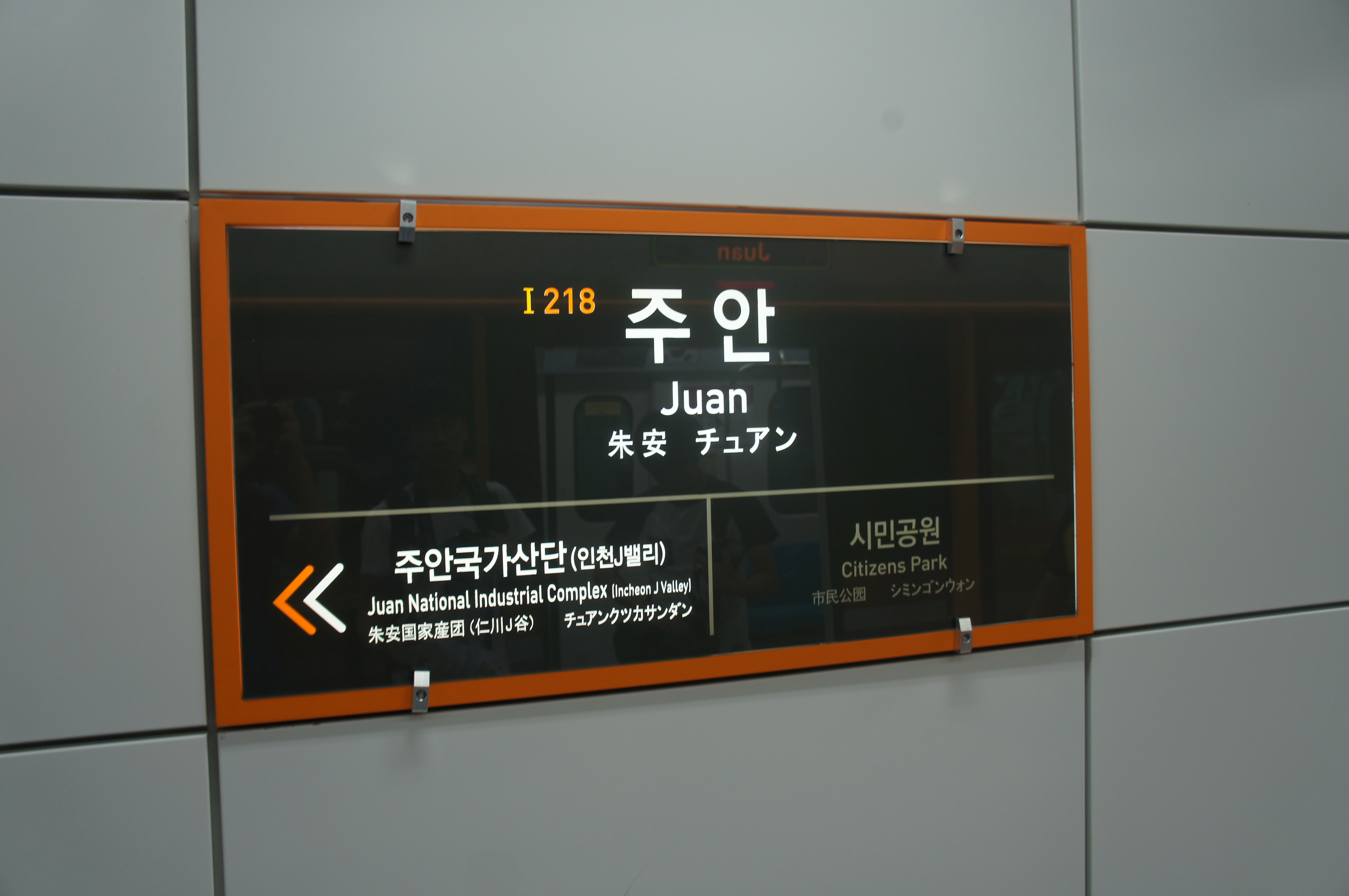
Incheon Line 2 station nameplate

Preceding station	Seoul Metropolitan Subway	Following station
Ganseok towards Yeoncheon	Line 1	Dohwa towards Incheon
Dongam towards Yongsan	Line 1 Gyeongin Express	Dongincheon Terminus
Ganseok towards Dongducheon	Line 1 Gyeongwon Express	Dohwa towards Incheon
Preceding station	Incheon Subway	Following station
Juan National Industrial Complex towards Geomdan Oryu	Incheon Line 2	Citizens Park towards Unyeon
