= Moraenae Market station =

Metro station in Incheon, South Korea

I223 모래내시장 (서울바른척도병원) Moraenae Market (Seoul Baruncheokdo Hospital)
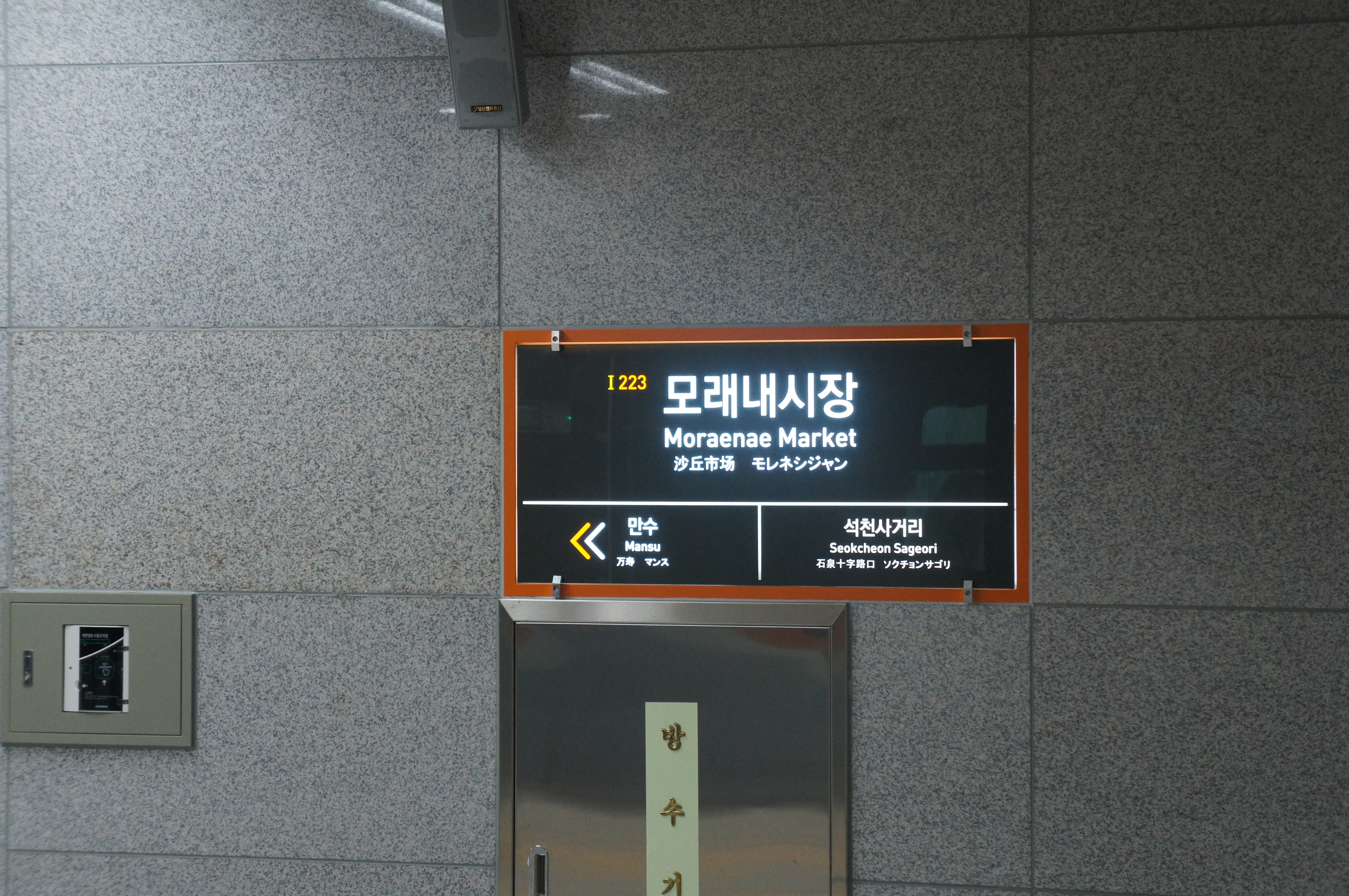

Korean name
- Hangul: 모래내시장역
- Hanja: 모래내市場驛
- Revised Romanization: Moraenae sijang yeok
- McCune–Reischauer: Moraenae sijang yŏk

General information
- Location: 341-6 Guwol-dong, Namdong District, Incheon
- Coordinates: 37°27′21″N 126°43′03″E
- Operator: Incheon Transit Corporation
- Line: Incheon Line 2
- Platforms: 2
- Tracks: 2

Key dates
- July 30, 2016: Incheon Line 2 opened
Location

Moraenae Market Station is a subway station on Line 2 of the Incheon Subway.

Preceding station	Incheon Subway	Following station
Seokcheon Sageori towards Geomdan Oryu	Incheon Line 2	Mansu towards Unyeon
