= Citizens Park station =

Metro station in Incheon, South Korea

I219 시민공원 (문화창작지대·아인병원) Citizens Park (Culture Creation Zone·Ain Hospital)
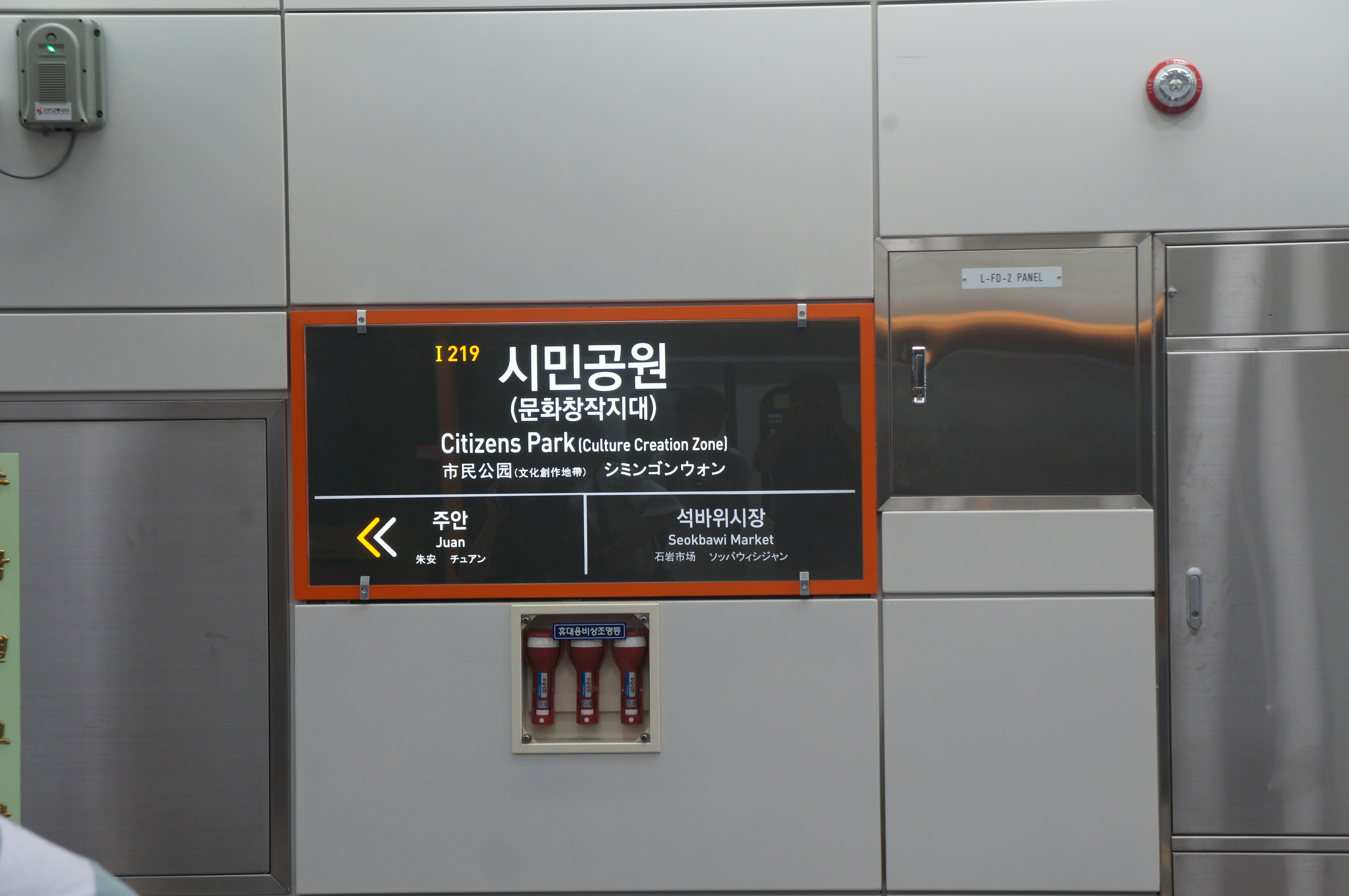

Korean name
- Hangul: 시민공원역
- Hanja: 市民公園驛
- Revised Romanization: Simin gongwon yeok
- McCune–Reischauer: Simin kongwŏn yŏk

General information
- Location: 189 Juan-dong, Michuhol District, Incheon
- Coordinates: 37°27′30″N 126°40′52″E
- Operator: Incheon Transit Corporation
- Line: Incheon Line 2
- Platforms: 2
- Tracks: 2

Key dates
- July 30, 2016: Incheon Line 2 opened
Location

Citizens Park Station is a subway station on Line 2 of the Incheon Subway.

Preceding station	Incheon Subway	Following station
Juan towards Geomdan Oryu	Incheon Line 2	Seokbawi Market towards Unyeon
