= Wanggil station =

Metro station in Incheon, South Korea

I202 왕길 (왕길역 로얄파크씨티) Wanggil (Wanggil Station Royal Park City)
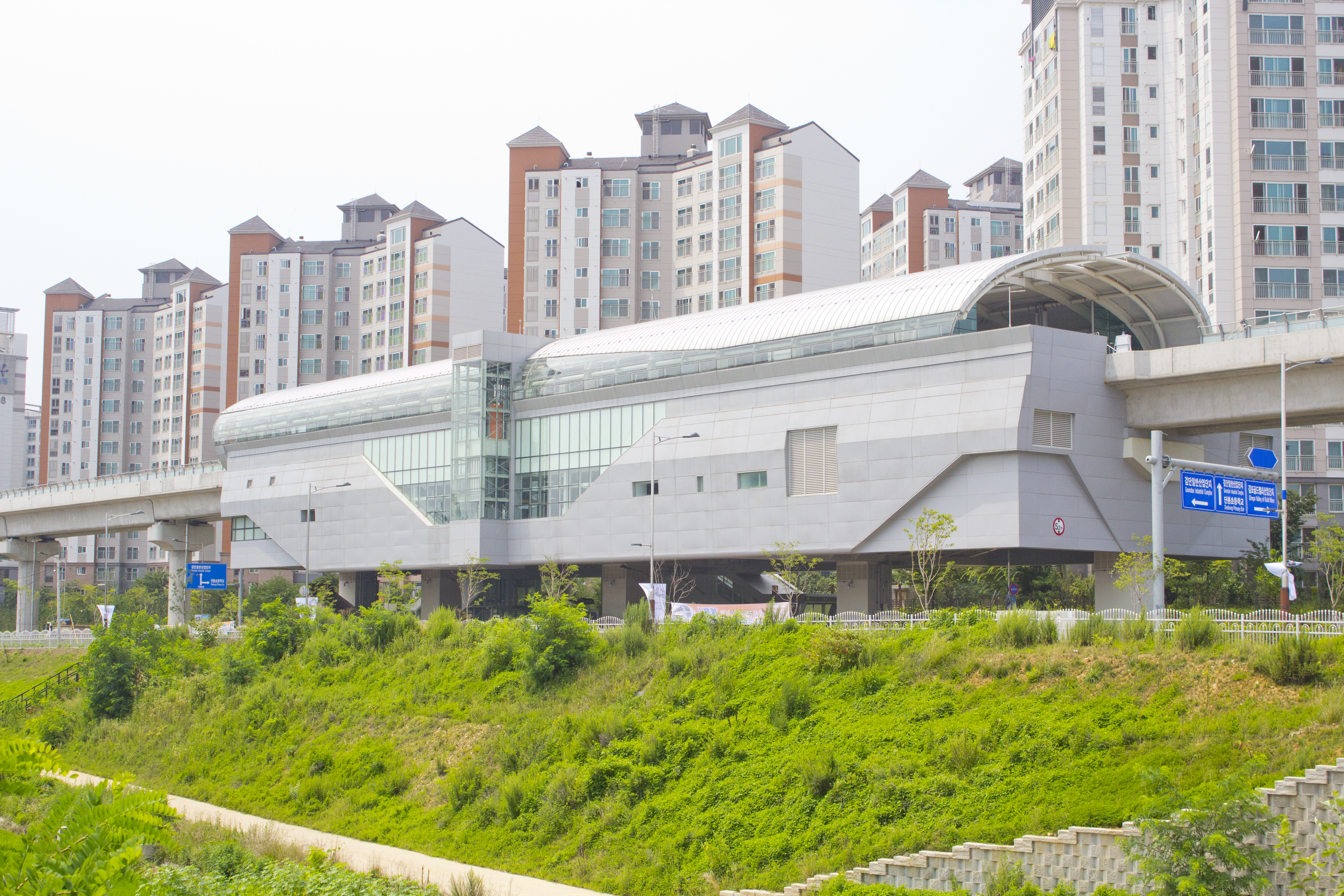

Korean name
- Hangul: 왕길역
- Hanja: 旺吉驛
- Revised Romanization: Wanggil yeok
- McCune–Reischauer: Wangkil yŏk

General information
- Location: 474-8 Wangil-dong, Geomdan District, Incheon
- Coordinates: 37°35′43″N 126°37′31″E
- Operator: Incheon Transit Corporation
- Line: Incheon Line 2
- Platforms: 2
- Tracks: 2

Construction
- Structure type: Aboveground

Other information
- Station code: I202

History
- Opened: July 30, 2016

Services
Preceding station	Incheon Subway	Following station
Geomdan Oryu Terminus	Incheon Line 2	Geomdan Sageori towards Unyeon
Location

Wanggil Station (Korean: 왕길역; Hanja: 旺吉驛) is a subway station on Line 2 of the Incheon Subway in Geomdan District, Incheon, South Korea.

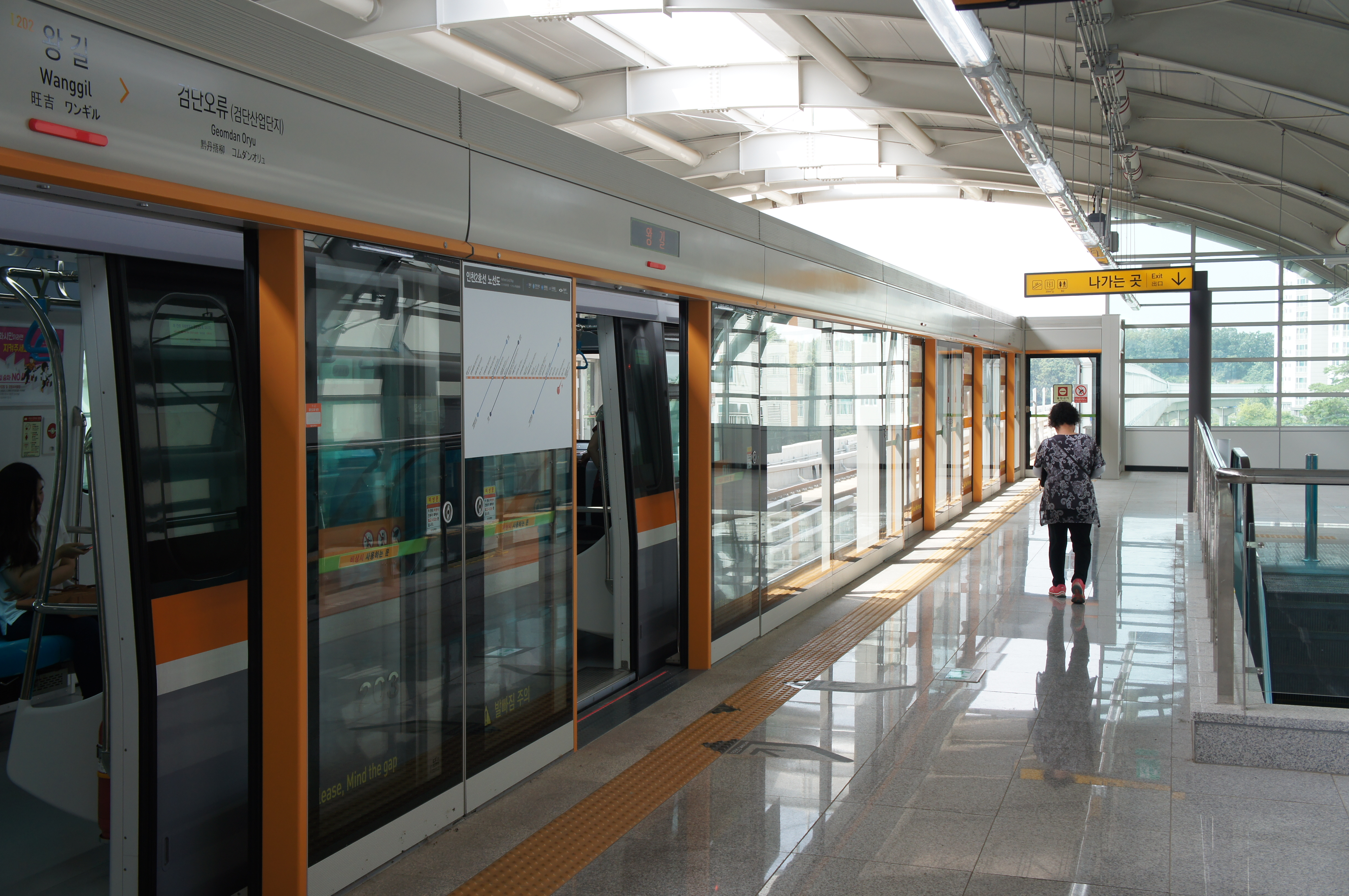
Station platform

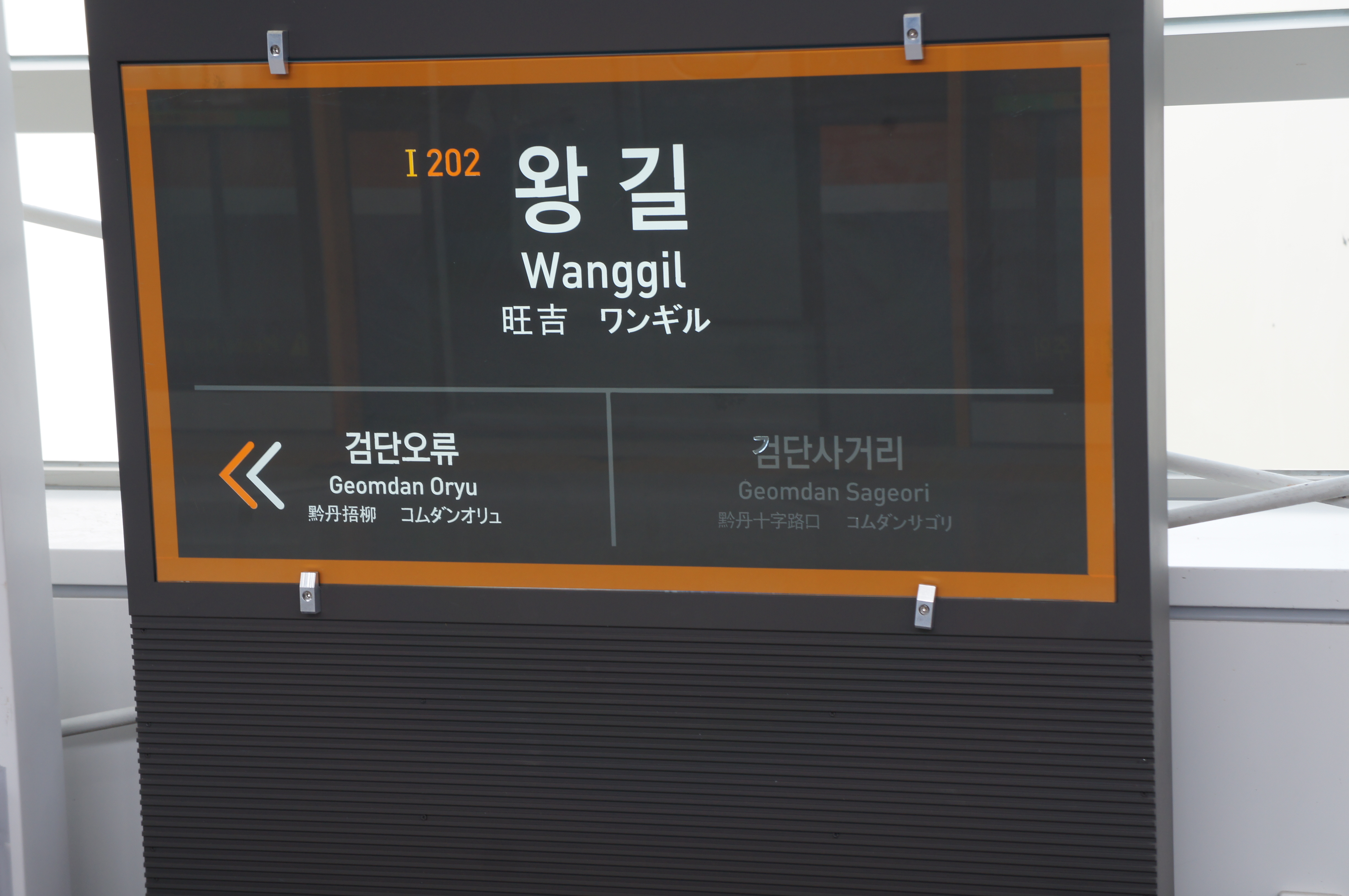
Station nameplate

== Station layout ==
G	Street Level	Exits
L1	Concourse	Faregates, Ticketing Machines, Station Control
L2; Platforms	Side platform, doors will open on the right
L2; Platforms	Westbound	← Incheon Line 2 toward Geomdan Oryu (Terminus)
L2; Platforms	Eastbound	→ Incheon Line 2 toward Unyeon (Geomdan Sageori) →
L2; Platforms	Side platform, doors will open on the right
