= Incheon Subway Line 2 =

Subway line in Incheon, South Korea

Incheon Line 2
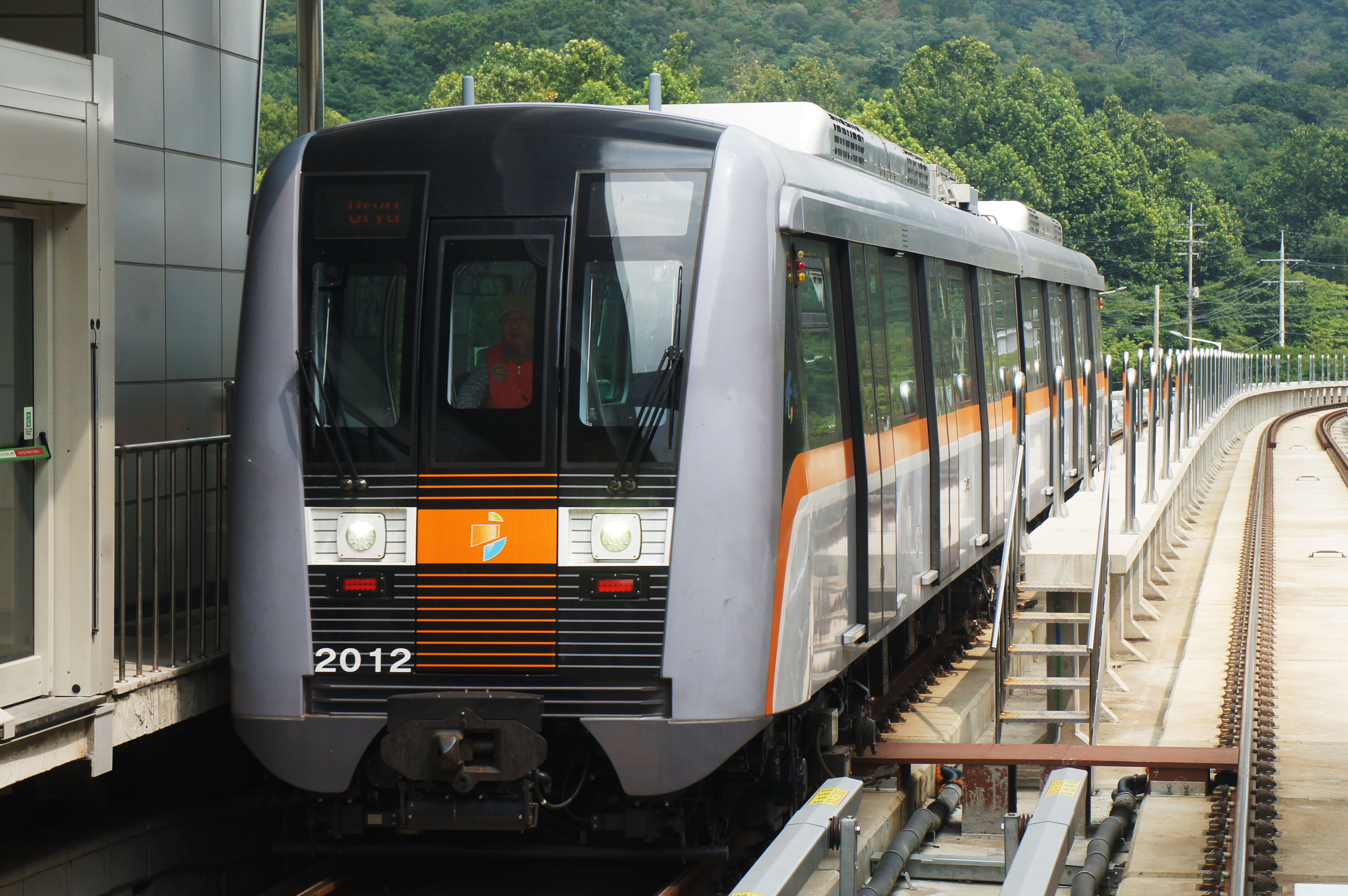

Overview
- Status: Operational
- Termini: Geomdan Oryu; Unyeon
- Stations: 27

Service
- Type: Driverless Light metro
- System: Incheon Subway
- Operator: Incheon Transit Corporation
- Depot: Unyeon

History
- Opened: July 30, 2016; 10 years ago

Technical
- Line length: 29.2 km (18.1 mi)
- Number of tracks: 2
- Electrification: 750 V DC third rail
Route map

Incheon Subway Line 2 (Korean: 인천도시철도 2호선) is a driverless light metro line running 29.2 km (18.1 mi) from Oryu-dong in Geomdan-gu to Incheon Grand Park, with 27 stations, part of the Incheon Subway system. The line is also included as a part of the overall Seoul Metropolitan Subway network; Juan station has a free transfer with Seoul Subway Line 1, Geomam station connects with the AREX Line to Incheon International Airport and Seoul Station, and Seongnam also has a free transfer with Seoul Subway Line 7.

Line 2 has aboveground sections north of Asiad Stadium and east of Namdong-gu Office.

== History ==
- June 26, 2009: Construction begins. The price of building the line was 2 trillion KRW.
- Early 2016: Trial runs begin.
- July 30, 2016: The line opens, after seven years of construction.

Line 2 was planned to open in August 2014, but the opening date was pushed back to July 30, 2016.

== Rolling stock and signaling ==
The ITC Line2 is a driverless, fully automatic subway system. The line uses 37 two-car trains, all of which were built in 2013 by Hyundai Rotem, a member of Hyundai Motor Group. They are similar to the Canada Line cars in Vancouver, Canada, albeit using the narrow light metro body (2.65 m (8 ft 8 in)) and external sliding doors as opposed to the heavy metro wide body 3 m (9 ft 10 in) and pocket doors, and using a bottom contact third rail instead of the North American top contact.

Currently, all stations are long enough to fit four-car trains (two sets mated together); however, current operations use two-car trains (one set per train).

SelTrac CBTC is currently being implemented on the line by Thales, along with an urban rail traffic management system; these systems will allow the trains to be driverless.

== Stations ==
All stations are in Incheon.

Station Number	Station Name English	Station Name Hangul	Transfer	Station Type	Location
I201	Geomdan Oryu (Geomdan Industrial Complex)	검단오류 (검단산업단지)		Aboveground	Geomdan-gu
I202	Wanggil	왕길		Aboveground	Geomdan-gu
I203	Geomdan Sageori	검단사거리		Underground	Geomdan-gu
I204	Majeon	마전		Underground	Geomdan-gu
I205	Wanjeong	완정		Underground	Geomdan-gu
I206	Dokjeong	독정		Underground	Geomdan-gu
I207	Geomam	검암	AREX	Aboveground	Seohae-gu
I208	Geombawi	검바위		Aboveground	Seohae-gu
I209	Asiad Stadium (Gongchon Sageori)	아시아드경기장 (공촌사거리)		Underground	Seohae-gu
I210	Seohae-gu Office	서해구청		Underground	Seohae-gu
I211	Gajeong (Lu1 City)	가정 (루원시티)		Underground	Seohae-gu
I212	Gajeong Jungang Market	가정중앙시장		Underground	Seohae-gu
I213	Seongnam (Geobuk Market)	석남 (거북시장)	Seoul Subway Line 7	Underground	Seohae-gu
I214	West Woman's Community Center	서부여성회관		Underground	Seohae-gu
I215	Incheon Gajwa	인천가좌		Underground	Seohae-gu
I216	Gajaeul	가재울		Underground	Seohae-gu
I217	Juan National Industrial Complex (Incheon J Valley)	주안국가산단 (인천J밸리)		Underground	Seohae-gu; Michuhol-gu
I218	Juan	주안	Seoul Subway Line 1	Underground	Michuhol-gu
I219	Citizens Park (Culture Creation Zone)	시민공원 (문화창작지대)		Underground	Michuhol-gu
I220	Seokbawi Market	석바위시장		Underground	Michuhol-gu
I221	Incheon City Hall	인천시청	Incheon Subway Line 1	Underground	Namdong-gu
I222	Seokcheon Sageori	석천사거리		Underground	Namdong-gu
I223	Moraenae Market	모래내시장		Underground	Namdong-gu
I224	Mansu	만수		Underground	Namdong-gu
I225	Namdong-gu Office	남동구청		Underground	Namdong-gu
I226	Incheon Grand Park	인천대공원		Aboveground	Namdong-gu
I227	Unyeon (Seochang)	운연 (서창)		Open-cut/Underground	Namdong-gu

== See also ==
- Incheon Transit Corporation
- Incheon Subway
- List of metro systems
- Seoul Metropolitan Subway
- Transportation in South Korea
