= Sangok station =

Metro station in Incheon, South Korea

산곡; Sangok
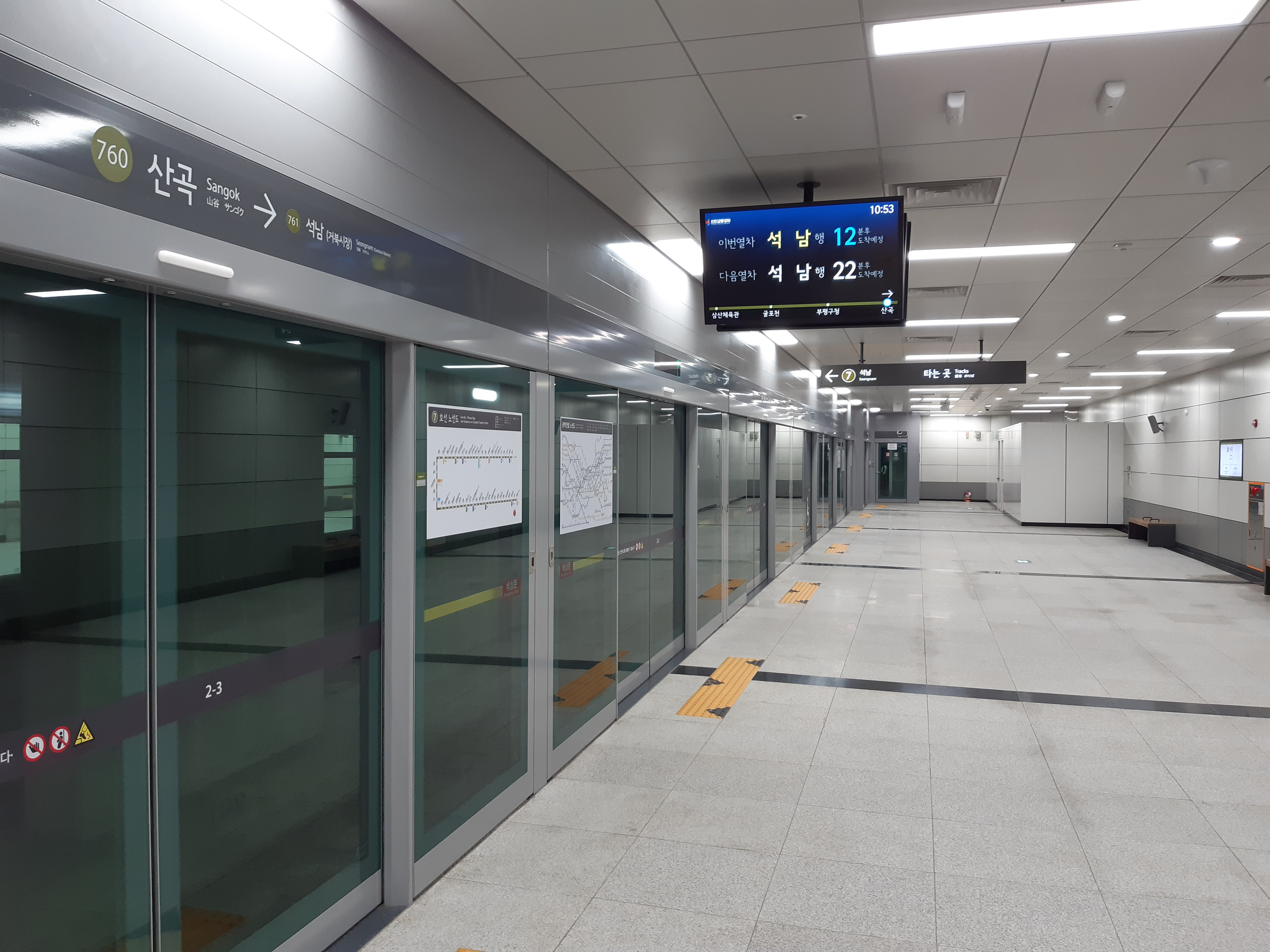

Korean name
- Hangul: 산곡역
- Hanja: 山谷驛
- RR: Sangok-yeok
- MR: San'gok-yŏk

General information
- Location: Bupyeong-gu, Incheon
- Operator: Incheon Transit Corporation
- Line: Line 7
- Platforms: 2
- Tracks: 2

Construction
- Structure type: Underground

Key dates
- May 22, 2021: Line 7 opened
Location

Sangok station (Korean: 산곡역) is a railway station on Seoul Subway Line 7.

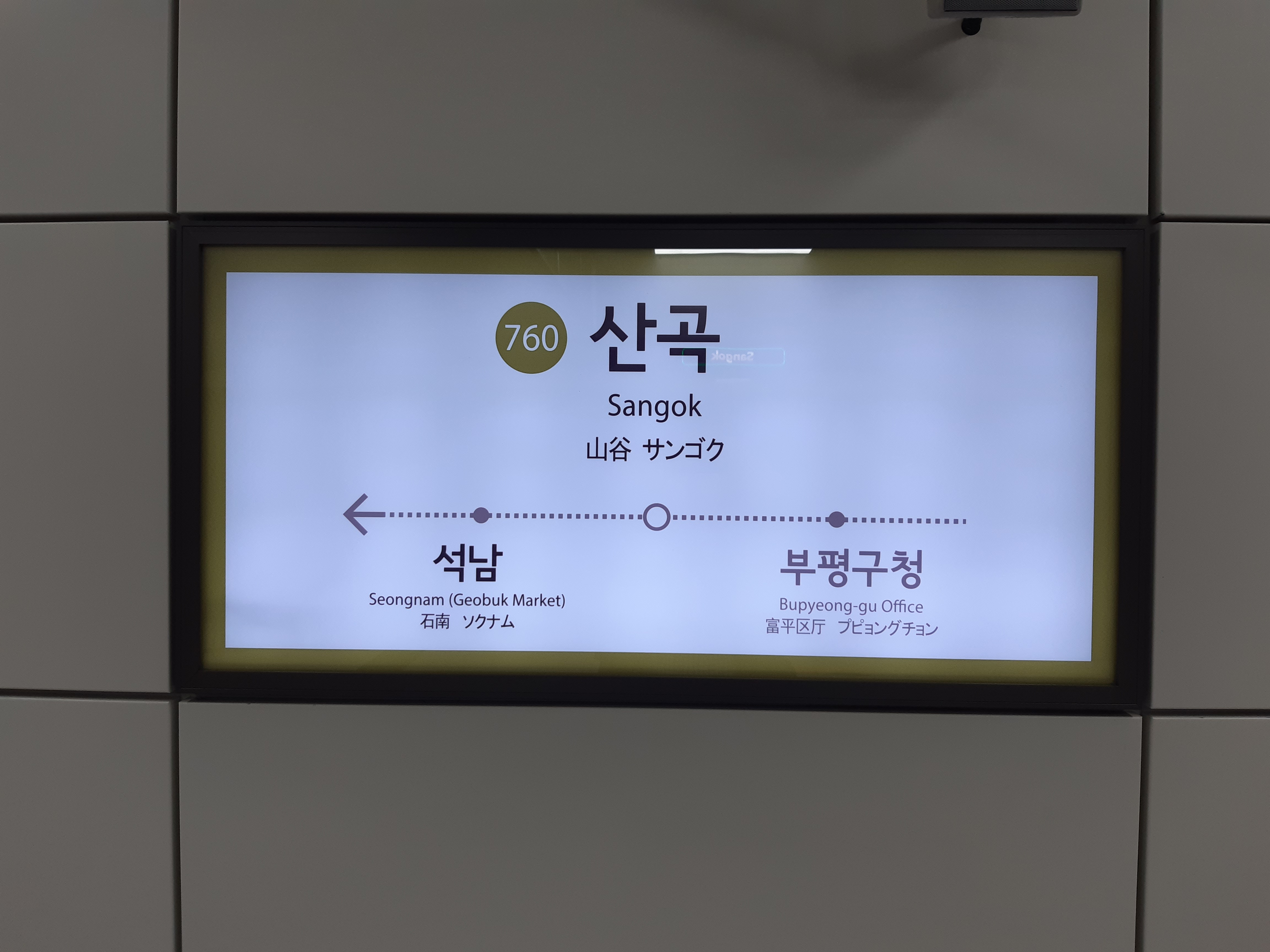

== Station layout ==
=== Seoul Subway Line 7 ===
Bupyeong-gu Office ↑
S/B | | N/B
↓ Seongnam

Southbound	← ● Line 7 toward Seongnam
Northbound	● Line 7 toward Jangam →

Preceding station	Seoul Metropolitan Subway	Following station
Bupyeong-gu Office towards Jangam	Line 7	Seongnam Terminus
