= Dohwa station =

Metro station in Incheon, South Korea

Coordinates: 37°27′58.02″N 126°40′5.75″E

도화; Dohwa
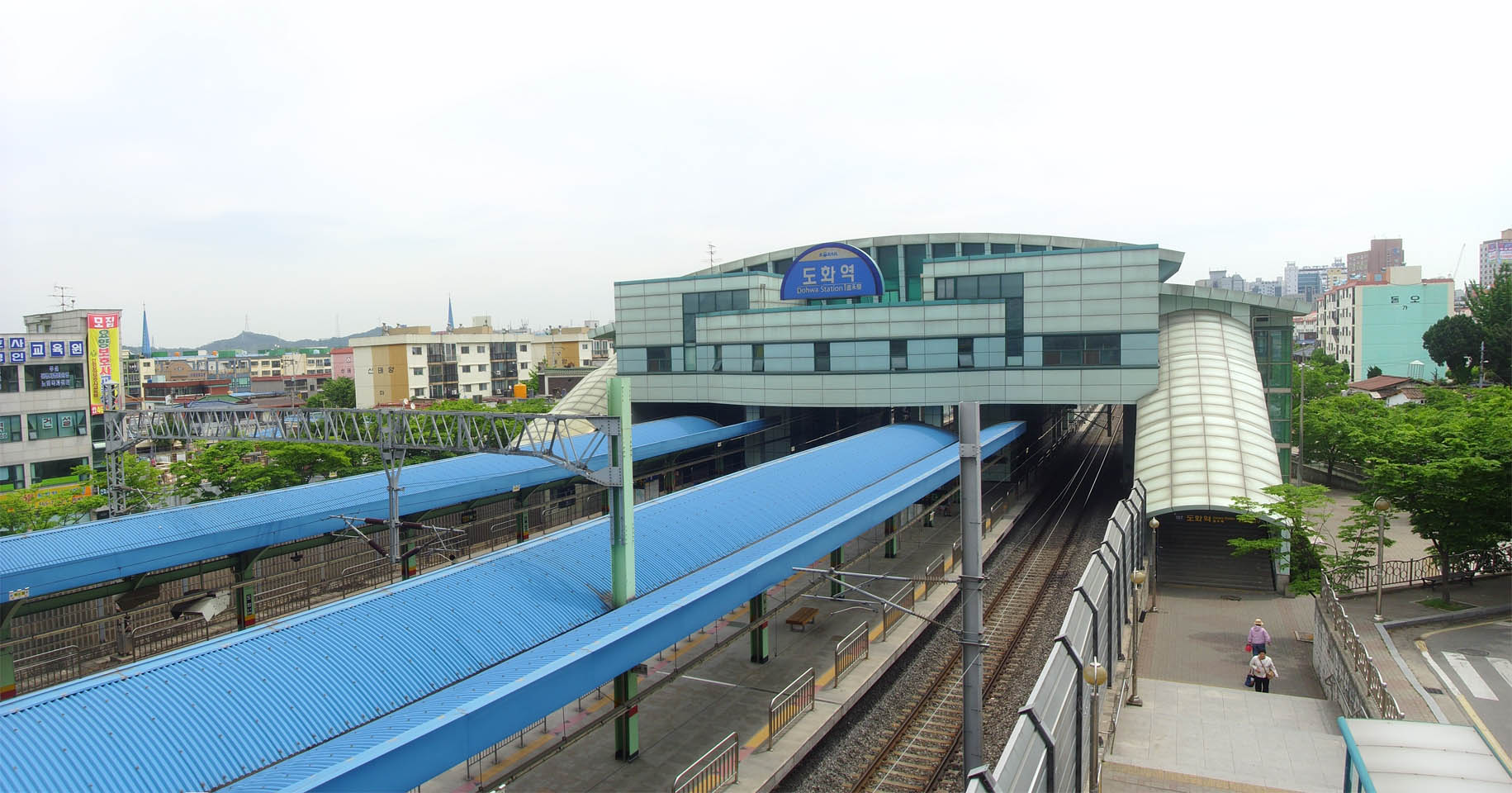

Korean name
- Hangul: 도화역
- Hanja: 道禾驛
- Revised Romanization: Dohwa-yeok
- McCune–Reischauer: Tohwa-yŏk

General information
- Location: 668 Dohwa 1-dong, 9 Sukgollo 24 Bongil, Michuhol-gu, Incheon
- Operator: Korail
- Line: Line 1
- Platforms: 2
- Tracks: 4

Construction
- Structure type: Aboveground

Key dates
- November 30, 2001: Line 1 opened

Passengers
- (Daily) Based on Jan-Dec of 2012. Line 1: 6,749

Dohwa Station (Korean: 도화역; Hanja: 道禾驛; RR: Dohwa-yeok) is a subway station in Nam-gu, Incheon, South Korea, operated by Korail. It was opened in 2001.

Preceding station	Seoul Metropolitan Subway	Following station
Juan towards Yeoncheon	Line 1	Jemulpo towards Incheon
Juan towards Dongducheon	Line 1 Gyeongwon Express	Jemulpo towards Incheon
