= Incheon Subway Line 3 =

Proposed rapid transit line in Incheon, South Korea

The future Line 3 is planned to be a semi-circular subway line of Incheon. With 66.73km of route extension, it was scheduled to win the title of the longest circular line in the world. When the initial plan was presented, the project was stranded due to lack of economic feasibility, but it is pushing ahead with its pledge to re-promote the project as a new mayor takes office.

== See also ==
- Incheon Subway
- Seoul Subway
- Transportation in South Korea
- Incheon
