= Seohae District =

District of Incheon, South Korea

Seohae
- Autonomous District
- Flag
- Interactive map of Seohae
- Country: South Korea
- Region: Sudogwon
- Provincial level: Incheon
- Administrative divisions: 16 administrative dong

Area
  - Total: 71.36 km^{2} (27.55 sq mi)

Population (2026)
  - Total: 391,000
  - Dialect: Seoul
- Website: seohae.go.kr

Korean name
- Hangul: 서해구
- Hanja: 西海區
- RR: Seohae-gu
- MR: Sŏhae-gu

Seohae District (Korean: 서해구; lit. 'West Sea District') is a district of Incheon, South Korea. It was established on July 1, 2026 after being split from the former Seo District.

== Administrative divisions ==
- Geomam-Gyeongseo-dong (divided into Geomam-dong and Gyeongseo-dong)
- Yeonhui-dong (divided into Yeonhui-dong, Gongchon-dong, and Simgok-dong)
- Cheongna 1-dong, Cheongna 2-dong, and Cheongna 3-dong (divided into parts of Cheongra-dong)
- Gajeong 1-dong, Gajeong 2-dong, and Gajeong 3-dong (divided into parts of Gajeong-dong)
- Sinhyeonwonchang-dong (divided into Shinhyeon-dong and Wonchang-dong)
- Seoknam 1-dong, Seoknam 2-dong, and Seoknam 3-dong (divided into parts of Seoknam-dong)
- Gajwa 1-dong, Gajwa 2-dong, Gajwa 3-dong, and Gajwa 4-dong (divided into parts of Gajwa-dong)
