= Geomdan Oryu station =

Metro station in Incheon, South Korea

I201 검단오류 (검단산업단지) Geomdan Oryu (Geomdan Industrial Complex)
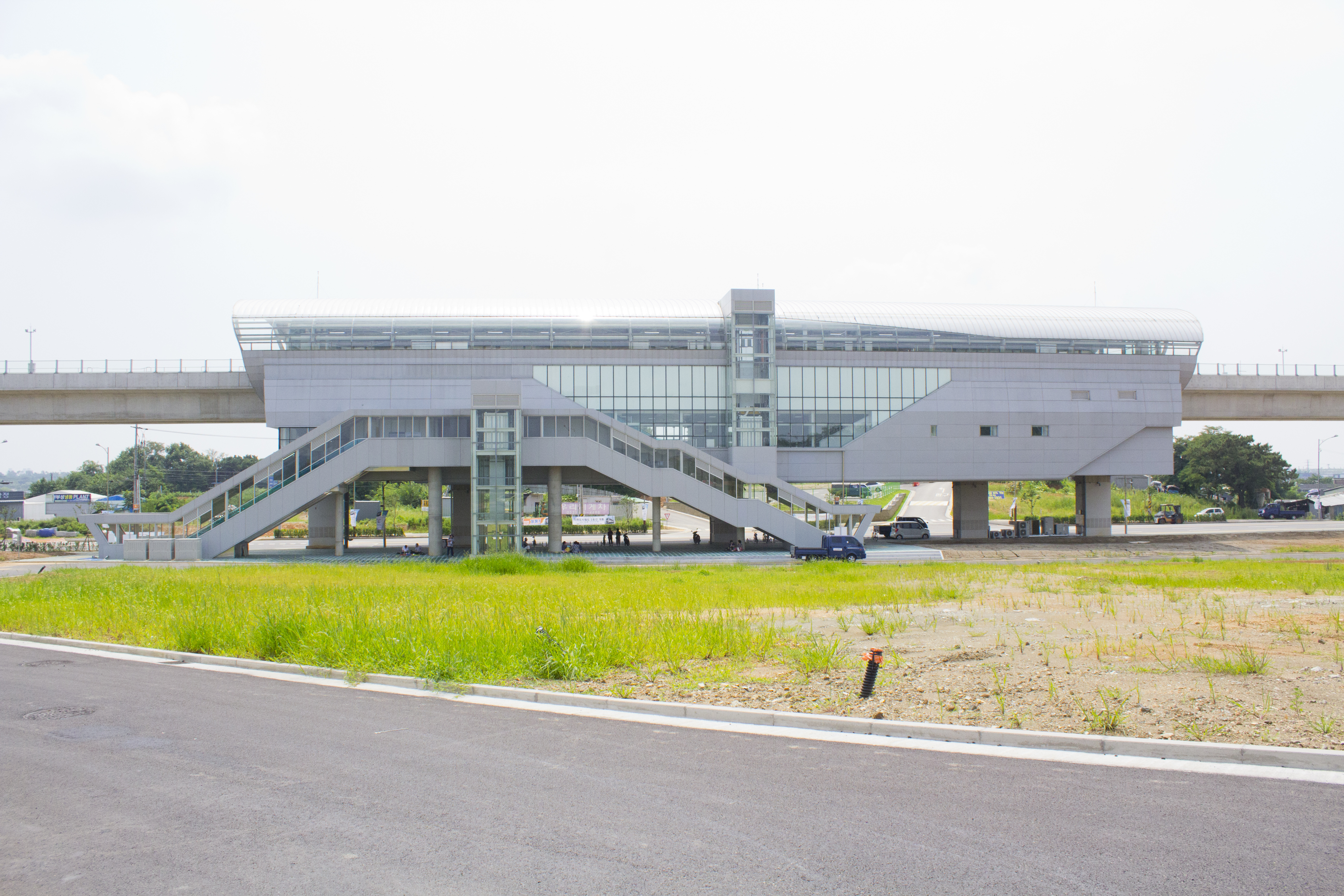

Korean name
- Hangul: 검단오류역
- Hanja: 黔丹梧柳驛
- Revised Romanization: Geomdan oryu yeok
- McCune–Reischauer: Kŏmtan oryu yŏk

General information
- Location: 450-4 Oryu-dong, Geomdan District, Incheon
- Coordinates: 37°35′42″N 126°36′37″E
- Operator: Incheon Transit Corporation
- Line: Incheon Line 2
- Platforms: 2
- Tracks: 2

Construction
- Structure type: Aboveground

Other information
- Station code: I201

History
- Opened: July 30, 2016

Services
Preceding station	Incheon Subway	Following station
Terminus	Incheon Line 2	Wanggil towards Unyeon
Location

Geomdan Oryu Station (Korean: 검단오류역; Hanja: 黔丹梧柳驛) is a subway station on Line 2 of the Incheon Subway in Geomdan District, Incheon, South Korea.

The nearby is Geomdan Industrial Complex, Oryu Jubak Station, Sugolgol Village, and the district to be developed in Oryu housing. It is the northern terminus of Line 2.

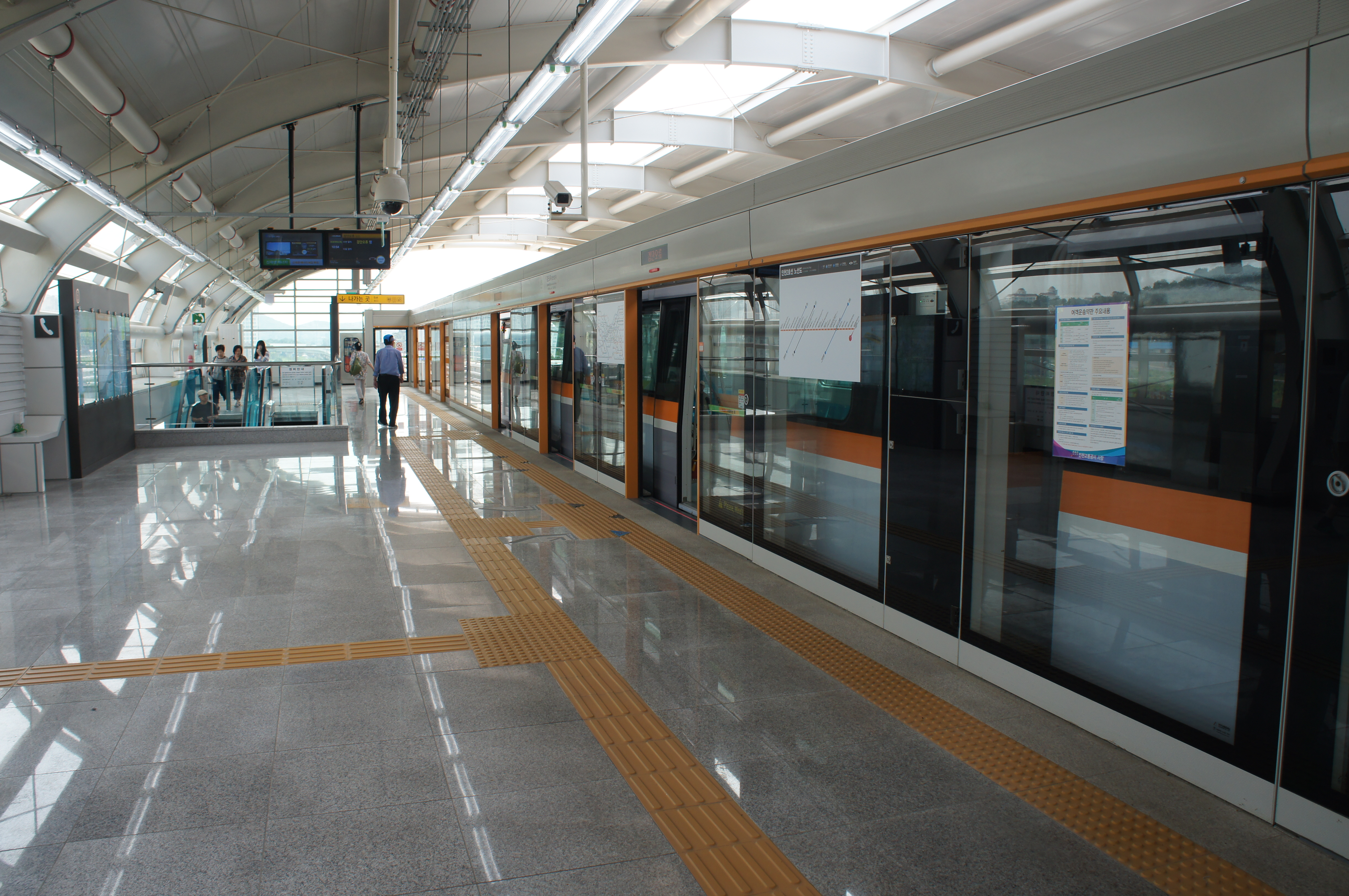
Station platform

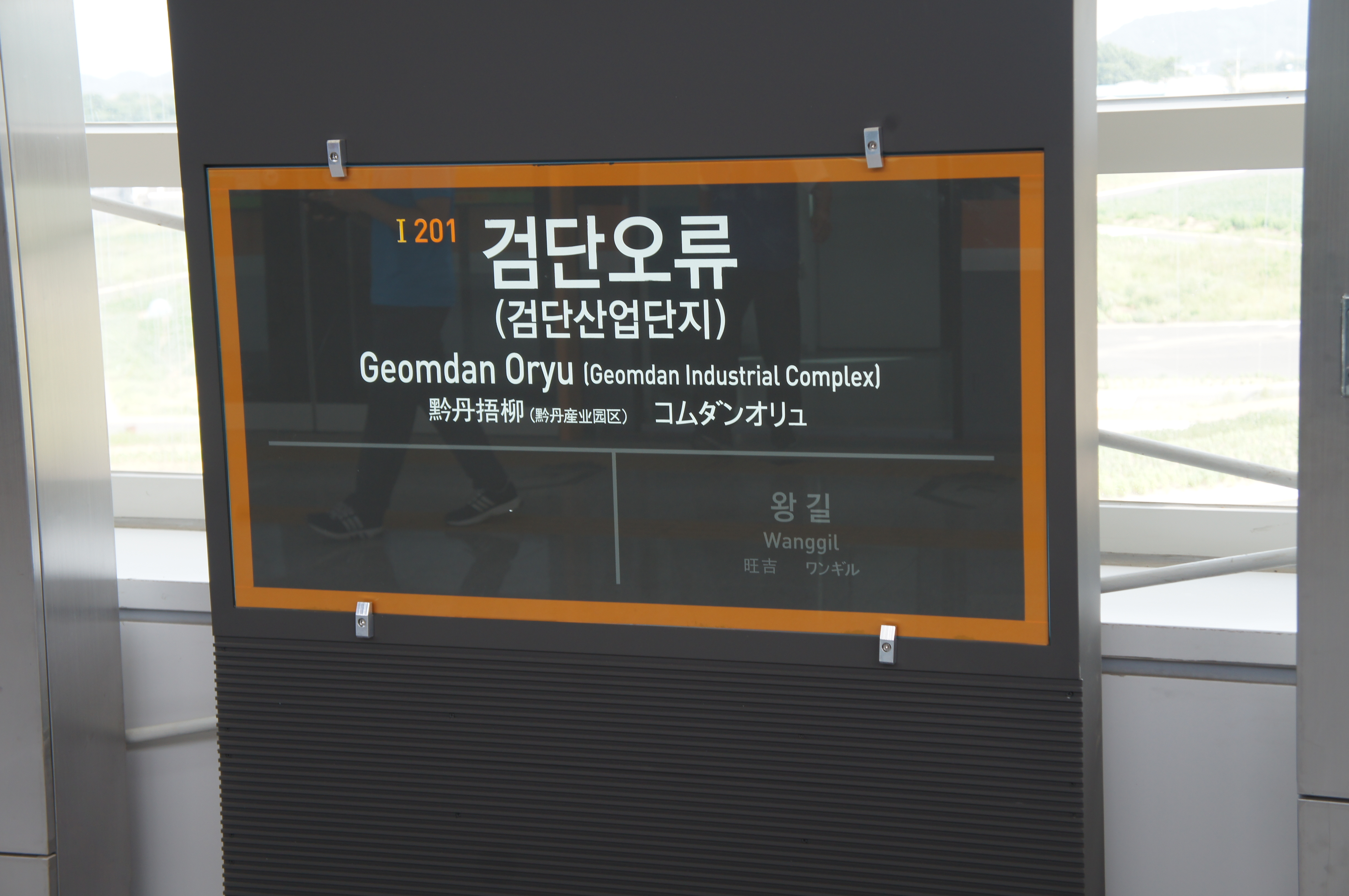
Station nameplate

== Station layout ==
G	Street Level	Exits
L1	Concourse	Faregates, Ticketing Machines, Station Control
L2; Platforms	Side platform, doors will open on the right
L2; Platforms	Westbound	← Incheon Line 2 Alighting Passengers Only
L2; Platforms	Eastbound	→ Incheon Line 2 toward Unyeon (Wanggil) →
L2; Platforms	Side platform, doors will open on the right
