= Unyeon station =

Metro station in Incheon, South Korea

I227 운연 (서창) Unyeon (Seochang)
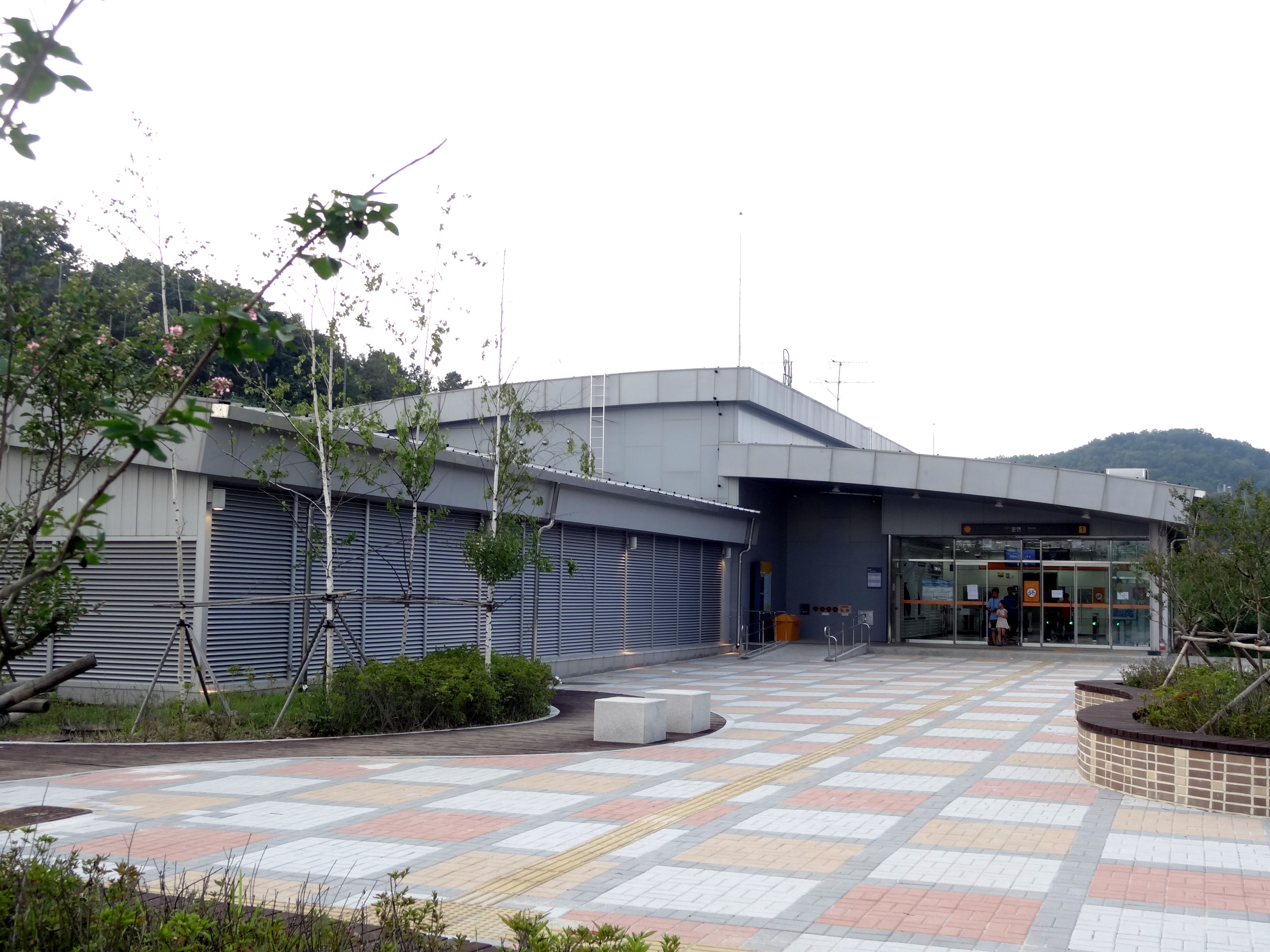

Korean name
- Hangul: 운연역
- Hanja: 雲宴驛
- Revised Romanization: Unyeong yeok
- McCune–Reischauer: Unyŏn yŏk

General information
- Location: 131-7 Unyeon-dong, Namdong District, Incheon
- Coordinates: 37°26′18″N 126°45′32″E
- Operator: Incheon Transit Corporation
- Line: Incheon Line 2
- Platforms: 2
- Tracks: 2

Key dates
- 30 July 2016: Incheon Line 2 opened
Location

Unyeon station (Korean: 운연역) is a subway station on Line 2 of the Incheon Subway.

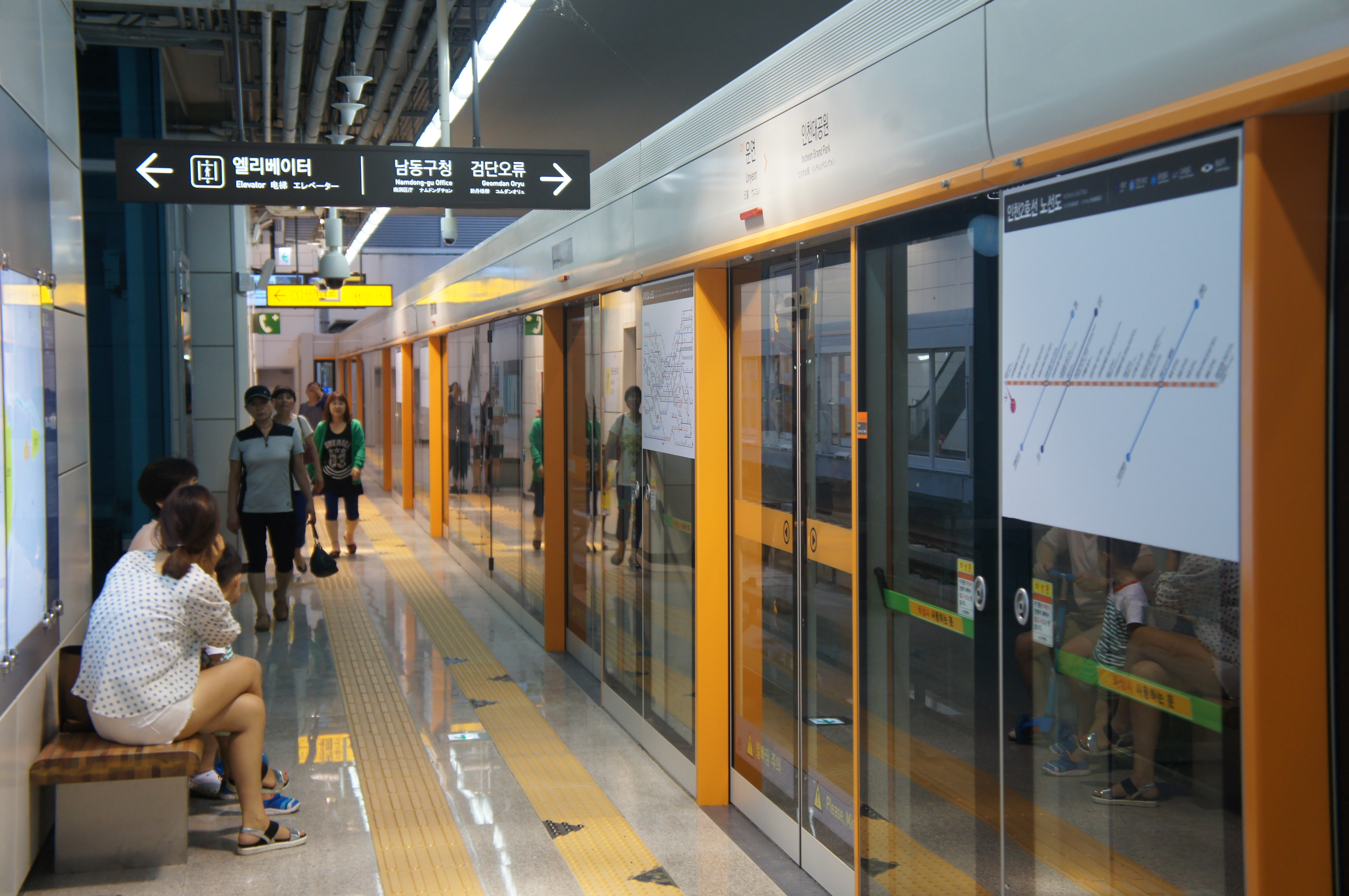
Station platform

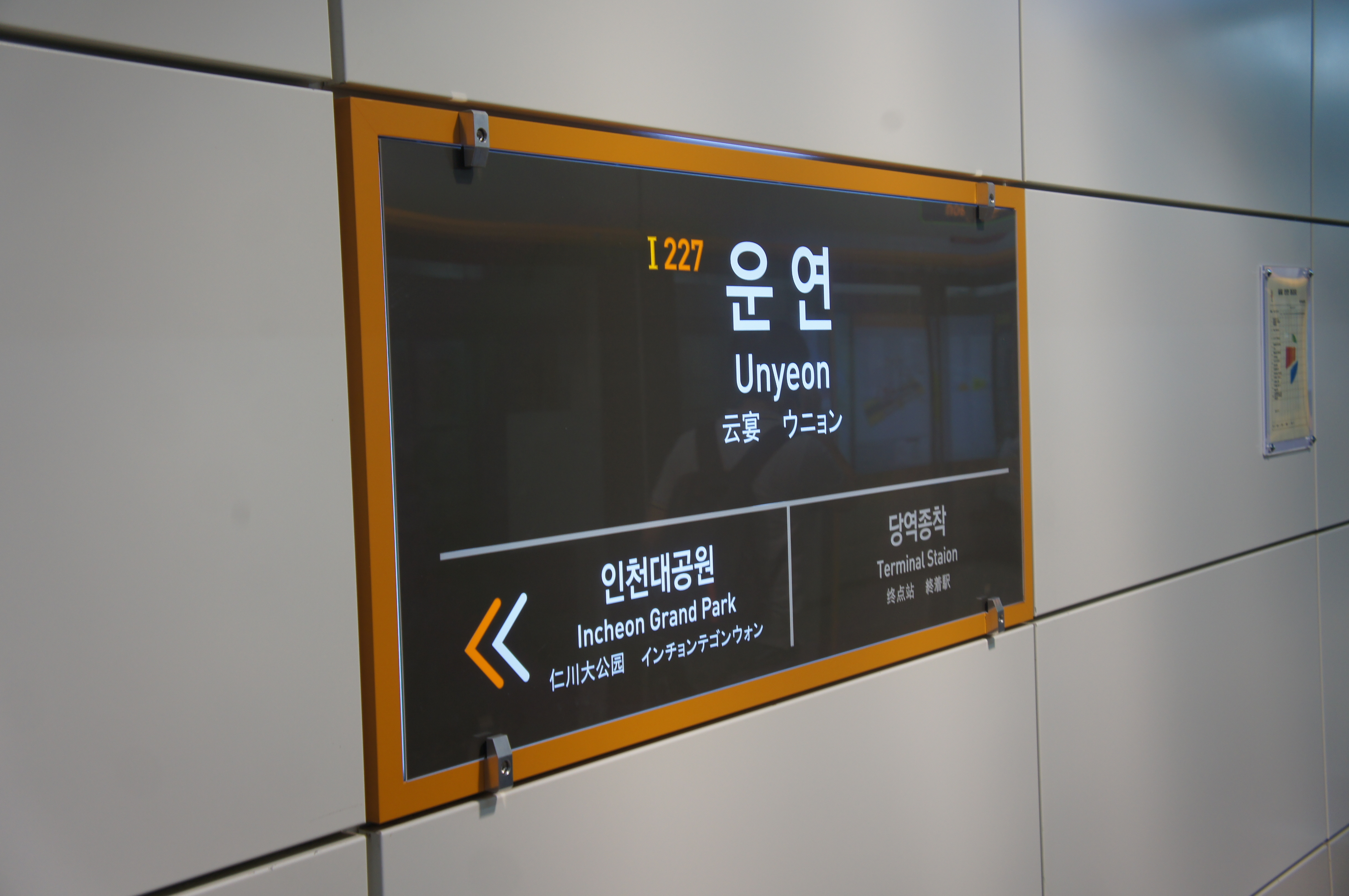
Station nameplate

Preceding station	Incheon Subway	Following station
Incheon Grand Park towards Geomdan Oryu	Incheon Line 2	Terminus
