= Incheon Transit Corporation =

Transit operator in Incheon, South Korea

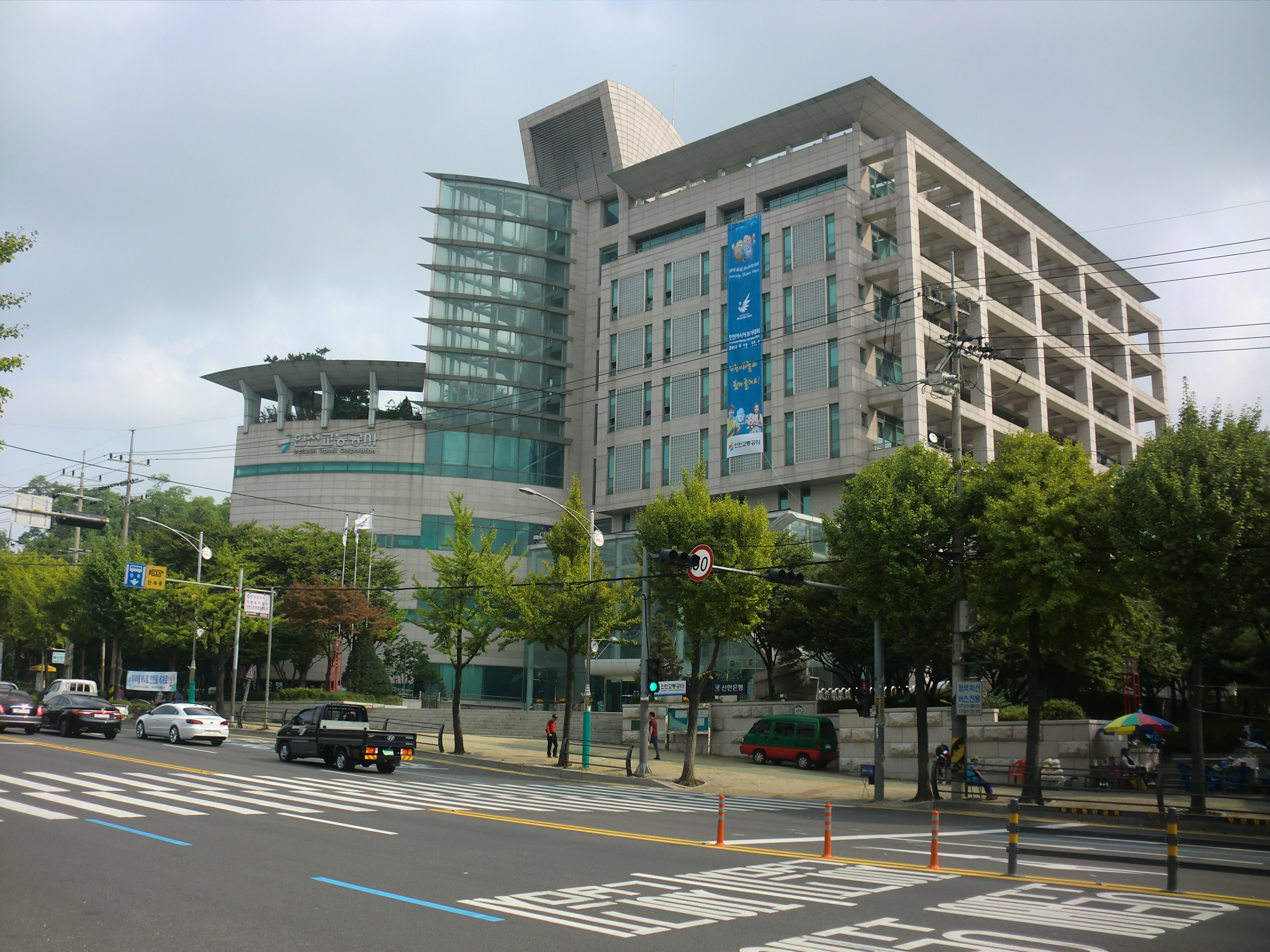
- Industry: Rapid transit
- Founded: 1993
- Headquarters: 674 Gyeonginno, Namdong-gu, Incheon
- Number of employees: 248
- Website: ictr.or.kr

- Incheon Transit Corporation
- Hangul: 인천교통공사
- Hanja: 仁川交通公社
- RR: Incheon gyotong gongsa
- MR: Inch'ŏn kyot'ong kongsa

Incheon Transit Corporation (인천교통공사), formerly known as Incheon Rapid Transit Corporation (인천지하철공사) currently operates the Incheon Subway, Wolmi Sea Train, Incheon Bus information, Incheon Bus Terminal, Call taxi for the handicapped in Incheon, South Korea, established in 1993. In 2011 Incheon Transit Corporation merged with ′Incheon Metro′, established in 1998 to operate Incheon Subway Line 1, Incheon Subway Line 2, the section of Seoul Subway Line 7 between Kkachiul & Seongnam, & the Incheon Airport Maglev. In the future it also has plans to operate Line 3.

== See also ==
- Seoul Metropolitan Subway
- Korail, operator of lines 1, 3, 4 (partial), the Suin-Bundang Line, the Gyeongui-Jungang Line, the Gyeonggang Line & the Gyeongchun Line.
- Seoul Metro, operator of lines 1-8
- Transportation in South Korea
