= National Route 46 (South Korea) =

Road in South Korea

National Route 46
- 국도 제46호선

Route information
- Length: 281.7 km (175.0 mi)
- Existed: 31 August 1971–present

Major junctions
- West end: Jung-gu, Incheon; National Route 6 National Route 42
- East end: Goseong, Gangwon Province; National Route 7

Location
- Country: South Korea

Highway system
- Highway systems of South Korea; Expressways; National; Local

National Route 46 is a major highway on the Korea It connects Incheon with the city(country) of Goseong, Gangwon Province

== Main stopovers ==
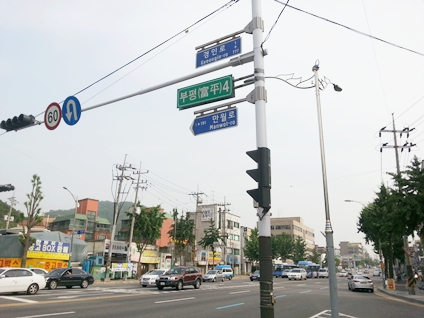
Bupyeong Intersection in Incheon

Incheon

- Jung District - Michuhol District - Namdong District - Bupyeong District

Gyeonggi Province

- Bucheon

Seoul

- Guro District - Yeongdeungpo District - Mapo Bridge - Mapo District - Yongsan District - Seongdong District - Gwangjin District

Gyeonggi Province

- Guri - Namyangju - Gapyeong County

Gangwon Province

- Chuncheon - Hwacheon County - Chuncheon - Yanggu County - Inje County - Goseong County

== Major intersections ==
- (■): Motorway

IS: Intersection, IC: Interchange

=== Incheon ===
Name	Hangul name	Connection	Location		Note
Incheon station (Incheon Station IS)	인천역 (인천역사거리)	National Route 6 National Route 77; Prefectural Route 84; Prefectural Route 98 (Jemullyang-ro); Wolmi-ro; China town-ro 51beon-gil	Incheon	Jung District	National Route 42, National Route 77 overlap Prefectural Route 84, 98 overlap Terminus
Incheon Jungbu Police Station	인천중부경찰서		Incheon	Jung District	National Route 42, National Route 77 overlap Prefectural Route 84, 98 overlap Terminus
Jung District Office Entrance	중구청입구	Jemullyang-ro 218beon-gil	Incheon	Jung District	National Route 42, National Route 77 overlap Prefectural Route 84, 98 overlap Terminus
Dongincheon Registration Office	동인천등기소		Incheon	Jung District	National Route 42, National Route 77 overlap Prefectural Route 84, 98 overlap Terminus
Sinpo IS	신포사거리	Sinpo-ro; Jemullyang-ro	Incheon	Jung District	National Route 42, National Route 77 overlap Prefectural Route 84, 98 overlap Terminus
(1st Wharf Entrance)	(제1부두입구)	Injung-ro	Incheon	Jung District	National Route 42, National Route 77 overlap Prefectural Route 84, 98 overlap Terminus
Sadong IS	사동삼거리	Uhyeon-ro	Incheon	Jung District	National Route 42, National Route 77 overlap Prefectural Route 84, 98 overlap Terminus
2nd International Ferry Terminal Incheon Commercial Girls' High School E-mart Dongincheon Store	인천제2국제여객터미널 인천여자상업고등학교 이마트 동인천점		Incheon	Jung District	National Route 42, National Route 77 overlap Prefectural Route 84, 98 overlap Terminus
Suin IS	수인사거리	Seohae-daero	Incheon	Jung District	National Route 42, National Route 77 overlap Prefectural Route 84, 98 overlap Terminus
Singwang IS	신광사거리	National Route 77; Prefectural Route 84; Prefectural Route 98 (Jemullyang-ro); Dowon-ro	Incheon	Jung District	National Route 42, National Route 77 overlap Prefectural Route 84, 98 overlap Terminus
Sungui Rotary	숭의로터리	Dokbae-ro; Saetgol-ro; Seokjeong-ro	Incheon	Michuhol District	National Route 42 overlap
Jangan IS	장안사거리	Michu-ro	Incheon	Michuhol District	National Route 42 overlap
Nam District Office IS	남구청사거리	Dokjeongi-ro	Incheon	Michuhol District	National Route 42 overlap
Sungui IS	숭의삼거리	Chamoejeon-ro	Incheon	Michuhol District	National Route 42 overlap
Jemulpo station (Jemulpo Station IS)	제물포역 (제물포역삼거리)	Subong-ro	Incheon	Michuhol District	National Route 42 overlap
Subong Park Entrance IS	수봉공원입구교차로	Subongbuk-ro	Incheon	Michuhol District	National Route 42 overlap
No name	(이름 없음)	Sukgol-ro; Juan-ro	Incheon	Michuhol District	National Route 42 overlap
Dohwa IC	도화 나들목	Gyeongin Expressway	Incheon	Michuhol District	National Route 42 overlap
Dohwa IC IS	도화IC교차로	Seokbawi-ro; Hannaru-ro	Incheon	Michuhol District	National Route 42 overlap
Juan IS	주안사거리	Jeil-ro	Incheon	Michuhol District	National Route 42 overlap
Old Citizens' Hall IS	옛시민회관사거리	Michuhol-daero	Incheon	Michuhol District	National Route 42 overlap
Seokbawi IS	석바위사거리	Gyeongwon-daero	Incheon	Michuhol District	National Route 42 overlap
No name	(이름 없음)	Guwol-ro	Incheon	Michuhol District	National Route 42 overlap
Incheon Gyeongwon Elementary School	인천경원초등학교		Incheon	Michuhol District	National Route 42 overlap
No name	(이름 없음)	Seoksan-ro	Incheon	Namdong District	National Route 42 overlap
No name	(이름 없음)	Munhwa-ro; Juan-ro	Incheon	Namdong District	National Route 42 overlap
Juwon IS	주원사거리	Yesul-ro	Incheon	Namdong District	National Route 42 overlap
Ganseok IS (Ganseogogeori station) Ganseogogeori Underpass	간석오거리 (간석오거리역) 간석오거리지하차도	National Route 42 (Baekbeom-ro); Namdong-daero	Incheon	Namdong District	National Route 42 overlap
Incheon Transit Corporation (Dongam station Entrance)	인천교통공사 (동암역입구)	Dongamnam-ro	Incheon	Bupyeong District	
Bupyeong IS (Bupyeongsamgeori station)	부평삼거리 (부평삼거리역)	Pyeongon-ro	Incheon	Bupyeong District	
Bupyeong IS	부평사거리	Majang-ro; Manwol-ro	Incheon	Bupyeong District	
Dongsu station (Dongsu Station IS)	동수역 (동수역사거리)	Dongsu-ro; Annam-ro	Incheon	Bupyeong District	
Dongsojeong IS	동소정사거리	Jangje-ro	Incheon	Bupyeong District	
Bugae IS	부개사거리	Dongsu-ro; Subyeon-ro	Incheon	Bupyeong District	
Songnae IC	송내 나들목	Seoul Ring Expressway	Incheon	Bupyeong District	
Gusan IS	구산사거리	Munemi-ro; Songnae-daero	Incheon	Bupyeong District	Continuation into Gyeonggi Province

=== Gyeonggi Province Bucheon City ===
Name	Hangul name	Connection	Location		Note
Sadan IS	사단사거리	Munemi-ro 448beon-gil	Bucheon City	Songnae-dong	Incheon - Gyeonggi Province border line
Jung-dong station (Songnae IS)	중동역 (송내사거리)	Jungdong-ro	Bucheon City	Songnae-dong	
Simgokgoga IS	심곡고가사거리	National Route 39 (Sinheung-ro); Simgok-ro	Bucheon City	Simgok-dong	National Route 39 overlap
South Bucheon station IS	부천역남부사거리	Seongju-ro	Bucheon City	Simgokbon-dong	National Route 39 overlap
Hau Pass Entrance	하우고개입구	Hau-ro	Bucheon City	Simgokbon-dong	National Route 39 overlap
Somyeong Underpass	소명지하차도	Wonmi-ro	Bucheon City	Simgokbon-dong	National Route 39 overlap
Sosa IS	소사삼거리	National Route 39 (Hohyeon-ro); Gyeonginyet-ro	Bucheon City	Sosabon-dong	National Route 39 overlap
Sosa station	소사역		Bucheon City	Sosabon-dong	
Seongsimgoga IS	성심고가사거리	Seongsim Overpass; Gyeonginyet-gil; Jibong-ro	Bucheon City	Goean-dong	
Yeokgok station (Yeokgoknambu Station IS)	역곡역 (역곡남부역 사거리)	Bugwang-ro	Bucheon City	Yeokgok-dong	
Yeokgokgoga IS	역곡고가 사거리	Angok-ro	Bucheon City	Yeokgok-dong	
Yuhan University	유한대학교		Bucheon City	Yeokgok-dong	Continuation into Seoul

=== Seoul ===
Name	Hangul name	Connection	Location		Note
Sungkonghoe University	성공회대학교		Seoul	Guro District	Gyeonggi Province - Seoul border line
Onsu station (Onsu Station Entrance)	온수역 (온수역입구)	Gyeongin-ro 3-gil	Seoul	Guro District	
Dongbu Steel Entrance	동부제강입구	Ori-ro	Seoul	Guro District	
Oryugoga	오류고가	Buil-ro	Seoul	Guro District	
Front of City World IS	시티월드앞교차로	Oryu-ro	Seoul	Guro District	
Oryu-dong IS	오류동삼거리	Gocheok-ro	Seoul	Guro District	
Oryu-dong station	오류동역 앞		Seoul	Guro District	
Oryu IC	오류 나들목	Seoul City Route 92 (Nambu Beltway)	Seoul	Guro District	
Gyeongin Middle School	경인중학교		Seoul	Guro District	
Gaebong IS	개봉사거리	Gyeongseo-ro; Gaebong-ro	Seoul	Guro District	
Guro Fire Station IS	구로소방서교차로	Jungang-ro	Seoul	Guro District	
Dongyang Mirae University	동양미래대학앞	Anyangcheon-ro	Seoul	Guro District	
Gocheok Bridge	고척교	National Route 1 (Seobu Urban Expressway)	Seoul	Guro District	
Guro station IS	구로역사거리	Gurojungang-ro	Seoul	Guro District	
Geori Park Entrance	거리공원입구	Gongwon-ro	Seoul	Guro District	
Sindorim station	신도림역		Seoul	Guro District	
Dorim Bridge IS	도림교교차로	Dorimcheon-ro	Seoul	Yeongdeungpo District	
Mullae-dong IS (Yeongdeungpo Registration Office) (Guro Tax Office) (Seoul Youngdengpo Elementary School)	문래동사거리 (영등포등기소) (구로세무서) (영등포초등학교)	Dorim-ro; Seonyu-ro	Seoul	Yeongdeungpo District	
Yeongdeungpo station, Lotte Department Store (North side)	영등포역, 롯데백화점 (북부)	Yangpyeong-ro	Seoul	Yeongdeungpo District	
Yeongdeungpo Rotary (Yeongdeungpo Motorway)	영등포 로터리 (영등포고가차도)	Nodeul-ro; Yeongdeungpo-ro	Seoul	Yeongdeungpo District	
Seoul Bridge	서울교 북단	Yeoui-daero	Seoul	Yeongdeungpo District	
Yeouido Park	여의도공원앞	Uisadang-daero	Seoul	Yeongdeungpo District	
Mapo Bridge IS	마포대교교차로	Yeouidong-ro; Yeouiseo-ro	Seoul	Yeongdeungpo District	
Mapo Bridge	마포대교		Seoul	Mapo District	
Mapo Br. IC	마포대교북단 나들목	Prefectural Route 23 (Gangbyeonbuk-ro); Mapo-daero	Seoul	Mapo District	Prefectural Route 23 overlap
No name	(이름 없음)	Wonhyo-ro	Seoul	Yongsan District	Prefectural Route 23 overlap
Wonhyo Br. IC	원효대교북단 나들목	Cheongpa-ro; Yeouidaebang-ro	Seoul	Yongsan District	Prefectural Route 23 overlap
Dongjak Br. IC	동작대교북단 나들목	Dongjak-daero	Seoul	Yongsan District	Prefectural Route 23 overlap
Banpo Br. IC	반포대교북단 나들목	Noksapyeong-daero	Seoul	Yongsan District	Prefectural Route 23 overlap
Hannam Br. IC	한남대교북단 나들목	Hannam-daero	Seoul	Yongsan District	Prefectural Route 23 overlap
No name	(이름 없음)	Dongbu Expressway	Seoul	Seongdong District	Prefectural Route 23 overlap
Seongsu Br. IC	성수대교북단 나들목	Gosanja-ro; Eonju-ro	Seoul	Seongdong District	Prefectural Route 23 overlap
Yeongdong Br. IC	영동대교북단 나들목	National Route 47 (Dongil-ro); Prefectural Route 23 (Yeongdong-daero)	Seoul	Gwangjin District	Prefectural Route 23 overlap
Cheongdam Br. IC	청담대교북단 나들목	Dongbu Expressway	Seoul	Gwangjin District	
Jamsil Br. IC	잠실대교북단 나들목	National Route 3 Songpa-daero; Jayang-ro	Seoul	Gwangjin District	
Gangbyeon station, Dongseoul Bus Terminal	강변역, 동서울터미널		Seoul	Gwangjin District	
Olympic Br. IC	올림픽대교북단 나들목	Gangdong-daero; Gwangnaru-ro	Seoul	Gwangjin District	
Cheonho Br. IC	천호대교북단 나들목	Gangbyeonbuk-ro; National Route 43 (Cheonho-daero)	Seoul	Gwangjin District	National Route 43 overlap
Gwangjang IS	광장사거리	Achasan-ro; Cheonho-daero	Seoul	Gwangjin District	National Route 43 overlap
Gwangjin Bridge IS	광진교삼거리	Gucheonmyeon-ro	Seoul	Gwangjin District	National Route 43 overlap
Seoul Sheraton Walkerhill	쉐라톤 워커힐호텔		Seoul	Gwangjin District	National Route 43 overlap Continuation into Gyeonggi Province

- Motorway section
  - Mapo Br. IC - Cheonho Br. IC (Gangbyeonbuk-ro)

=== Gyeonggi Province ===
Name	Hangul name	Connection	Location		Note
Achiul IS	아치울삼거리	Gangbyeonbuk-ro	Guri City	Gyomun-dong	National Route 43 overlap Seoul - Gyeonggi Province border line
Cosmos-gil IS	코스모스길삼거리	Koseumoseu-gil	Guri City	Gyomun-dong	National Route 43 overlap
Dorim IS (Guri Police Station)	도림삼거리 (구리경찰서)	Jangja-daero	Guri City	Gyomun-dong	National Route 43 overlap
Jeonggaksa Entrance	정각사입구	Imunan-ro	Guri City	Gyomun-dong	National Route 43 overlap
Guri City Hall Dorim Elementary School	구리시청 도림초등학교		Guri City	Gyomun-dong	National Route 43 overlap
Tax Office Entrance IS	세무서입구삼거리	Angol-ro	Guri City	Gyomun-dong	National Route 43 overlap
Gyomun IS	교문사거리	National Route 6 (Gyeongchun-ro)	Guri City	Gyomun-dong	National Route 43 overlap
Inchang IS	인창삼거리	Inchang 1-ro	Guri City	Inchang-dong	National Route 43 overlap
Seonglim Sport	성림스포츠앞	Eungdalmal-ro	Guri City	Inchang-dong	National Route 43 overlap
Wholesale Market IS	도매시장사거리	Geonwon-daero; Donggureung-ro 136beon-gil	Guri City	Donggu-dong	National Route 43 overlap
Guri IC	구리 나들목	Seoul Ring Expressway; Bukbu Expressway	Guri City	Donggu-dong	National Route 43 overlap
Sano IC	사노 나들목	National Route 47 (Geumgang-ro); Donggureung-ro	Guri City	Donggu-dong	National Route 43, National Route 47 overlap
Saro Bridge	사로교				National Route 43, National Route 47 overlap
Saro Bridge			Namyangju City	Jingeon-eup	National Route 43, National Route 47 overlap
Jingwan IC	진관 나들목	National Route 43; National Route 47 (Geumgang-ro)	Namyangju City	Jingeon-eup	National Route 43, National Route 47 overlap
Meokgol IS	먹골 교차로	Prefectural Route 86 (Yangjin-ro)	Namyangju City	Jingeon-eup	
Saneung IS	사능 교차로	Saneung-ro	Namyangju City	Jingeon-eup	
Hopyeong Tunnel	호평터널		Namyangju City	Pyeongnae-dong	Right tunnel: Approximately 513m Left tunnel: Approximately 515m
Hopyeong Tunnel			Namyangju City	Hopyeong-dong	Right tunnel: Approximately 513m Left tunnel: Approximately 515m
Hopyeong IC	호평 나들목	Neureul 1-ro	Namyangju City	Hopyeong-dong	
Hopyeong Bridge	호평교		Namyangju City	Hopyeong-dong	
Maseok Tunnel	마석터널		Namyangju City	Hopyeong-dong	Right tunnel: Approximately 1,320m Left tunnel: Approximately 1,279m
Maseok Tunnel			Namyangju City	Hwado-eup	Right tunnel: Approximately 1,320m Left tunnel: Approximately 1,279m
Maseok IC (Hwado IC)	마석 나들목 (화도 나들목)	Seoul-Yangyang Expressway; Prefectural Route 387 (Sure-ro)	Namyangju City	Hwado-eup	
Moran Tunnel	모란터널		Namyangju City	Hwado-eup	Right tunnel: Approximately 1,610m Left tunnel: Approximately 1,598m
Wolsan IC	월산 나들목	Gyeongchun-ro 2248beon-gil	Namyangju City	Hwado-eup	
Geumnam IC	금남 나들목	National Route 45 (Bukhangang-ro)	Namyangju City	Hwado-eup	National Route 45 overlap
Saetteo IS	샛터 교차로	Gyeongchun-ro; Bukhangang-ro	Namyangju City	Hwado-eup	National Route 45 overlap
Guun Bridge	구운교		Gapyeong County	Cheongpyeong-myeon	National Route 45 overlap
Daeseong-ri station	대성리역		Gapyeong County	Cheongpyeong-myeon	National Route 45 overlap
Daeseong IS	대성교차로	Prefectural Route 98 (Namga-ro)	Gapyeong County	Cheongpyeong-myeon	National Route 45 overlap
Sincheongpyeong Bridge IS	신청평대교앞교차로	National Route 37; Prefectural Route 391 (Yumyeong-ro)	Gapyeong County	Cheongpyeong-myeon	National Route 37, National Route 45 overlap Prefectural Route 391 overlap
Sodolma-eul IS Sincheongpyeong 1 Bridge	소돌마을앞 교차로 신청평1교		Gapyeong County	Cheongpyeong-myeon	National Route 37, National Route 45 overlap Prefectural Route 391 overlap
Cheongpyeong Dam Entrance IS	청평댐입구삼거리	Prefectural Route 391 (Hoban-ro)	Gapyeong County	Cheongpyeong-myeon	National Route 37, National Route 45 overlap Prefectural Route 391 overlap
Cheongpyeong Bridge IS	청평대교앞교차로		Gapyeong County	Cheongpyeong-myeon	National Route 37 overlap
Cheongpyeong IS	청평삼거리	Gucheongpyeong-ro; Cheongpyeongjungang-ro	Gapyeong County	Cheongpyeong-myeon	National Route 37 overlap
Cheongpyeongwit IS	청평윗삼거리	Cheongpyeongjungang-ro	Gapyeong County	Cheongpyeong-myeon	National Route 37 overlap
Jojjong Bridge (Cheongpyeong Checkpoint)	조종교 (청평검문소앞)	Cheonggun-ro	Gapyeong County	Cheongpyeong-myeon	National Route 37 overlap
Hacheon IC	하천 나들목	National Route 37 (Jojong-ro)	Gapyeong County	Cheongpyeong-myeon	National Route 37 overlap
Surijaema-eul Entrance	수리재마을입구	Surijae-ro	Gapyeong County	Cheongpyeong-myeon	
Sangcheon station Entrance	상천역입구	Sangcheonyeong-ro	Gapyeong County	Cheongpyeong-myeon	
Bitgo Bridge	빛고개		Gapyeong County	Cheongpyeong-myeon	
Hasaek Bridge	하색교		Gapyeong County	Gapyeong-eup	
Gapyeong High School	가평고등학교		Gapyeong County	Gapyeong-eup	
Gapyeong IS Gapyeong Fire Station	가평오거리 가평소방서	National Route 75; Prefectural Route 391 (Hoban-ro) (Gahwa-ro)	Gapyeong County	Gapyeong-eup	
Gyeonggang Bridge	경강교		Gapyeong County	Gapyeong-eup	Continuation into Gangwon Province

=== Gangwon Province ===
Name	Hangul name	Connection	Location		Note
Gyeonggang Bridge	경강교		Chuncheon City	Namsan-myeon	Gyeonggi Province - Gangwon Province border line
No name	(이름 없음)	Bangha-ro	Chuncheon City	Namsan-myeon	
Haetgol IS	햇골교차로	Haetgol-ro	Chuncheon City	Namsan-myeon	
Gyeonggang IS	경강교차로	Seobaek-gil	Chuncheon City	Namsan-myeon	
Chunseong Bridge	춘성대교		Chuncheon City	Namsan-myeon	
No name	(이름 없음)	Bonap-ro	Chuncheon City	Seo-myeon	
Goyeok Bridge (Seoul-bound) Dangrim Bridge (Goseong-bound)	고역교(하행) 당림교(상행)		Chuncheon City	Seo-myeon	
Gangchon IS (Gangchon Intercity Bus Stop)	강촌삼거리 (강촌시외버스정류장)	Prefectural Route 403 (Gangchon-ro)	Chuncheon City	Seo-myeon	Prefectural Route 403 overlap
Deungseon Bridge	등선교		Chuncheon City	Seo-myeon	Prefectural Route 403 overlap Goseong-bound Only
Uiam IS	의암 교차로	Prefectural Route 403 (Baksa-ro)	Chuncheon City	Seo-myeon	Prefectural Route 403 overlap
Uiam Bridge	의암교		Chuncheon City	Seo-myeon	
No name	(이름 없음)	Yetgyeongchun-ro	Chuncheon City	Sindong-myeon	
Uiam Tunnel	의암터널		Chuncheon City	Sindong-myeon	Right tunnel: Approximately 307m Left tunnel: Approximately 290m
Palmi IS	팔미 교차로	Prefectural Route 70 (Hanchi-ro); Gyeongchun-ro	Chuncheon City	Sindong-myeon	
Hakgok IS	학곡사거리	National Route 5 (Yeongseo-ro)	Chuncheon City	Dongnae-myeon	National Route 5 overlap
Chuncheon IC	춘천 나들목	Jungang Expressway	Chuncheon City	Dongnae-myeon	National Route 5 overlap
No name	(이름 없음)	Geodu-gil	Chuncheon City	Dongnae-myeon	National Route 5 overlap
Mancheon IS	만천사거리	Geumcheon-ro; Hansolmancheon-ro	Chuncheon City	Dong-myeon	National Route 5 overlap
Gangwon-do Human Resource Development Institute	강원도인재개발원		Chuncheon City	Dong-myeon	National Route 5 overlap
Mancheon JCT	만천 분기점	Sunhwan-daero	Chuncheon City	Dong-myeon	National Route 5 overlap
Dongmyeon IC	동면 나들목	National Route 56; Prefectural Route 56 (Garakjae-ro); Chuncheon-ro	Chuncheon City	Dong-myeon	National Route 5, National Route 56 overlap Prefectural Route 56 overlap
Soyang 6 Bridge	소양6교		Chuncheon City	Dong-myeon	National Route 5, National Route 56 overlap Prefectural Route 56 overlap
Cheonjeon IC	천전 나들목	Sinsaembat-ro	Chuncheon City	Sinbuk-eup	National Route 5, National Route 56 overlap Prefectural Route 56 overlap
Sinbuk IS	신북 교차로	National Route 5 National Route 56; Prefectural Route 56 (Sunhwan-daero)	Chuncheon City	Sinbuk-eup	National Route 5, National Route 56 overlap Prefectural Route 56 overlap
Baehuryeong Tunnel	배후령터널		Chuncheon City	Sinbuk-eup	Approximately 5,057m
Seook IS	서옥교차로	Baehuryeong-gil	Hwacheon County	Gandong-myeon	
Gancheok KSS	간척사거리	Prefectural Route 461 (Gancheokwolmyeong-ro); Obongsan-gil	Hwacheon County	Gandong-myeon	
Gancheok Bridge	간척대교		Hwacheon County	Gandong-myeon	
Chugok Tunnel	추곡터널		Hwacheon County	Gandong-myeon	Approximately 864m
Chugok IS	추곡삼거리	Buksan-ro	Chuncheon City	Buksan-myeon	
Chugokyaksu IS	추곡약수삼거리	Soyangho-ro	Chuncheon City	Buksan-myeon	
Chugok Bridge	추곡교		Chuncheon City	Buksan-myeon	
Suin Tunnel	수인터널		Chuncheon City	Buksan-myeon	Approximately 2925m
Suin IS	수인사거리	Soyangho-ro	Yanggu County	Yanggu-eup	
Suin Bridge	수인교		Yanggu County	Yanggu-eup	
Ungjin Tunnel	웅진터널		Yanggu County	Yanggu-eup	Approximately 1225m
Ungjin 1 Tunnel	웅진1터널		Yanggu County	Yanggu-eup	Approximately 385m
Ungjin IS	웅진교차로	Soyangho-ro	Yanggu County	Yanggu-eup	
Ungjin 1 Bridge Ungjin 2 Bridge	웅진1교 웅진2교		Yanggu County	Yanggu-eup	
Ungjin 2 Tunnel	웅진2터널		Yanggu County	Yanggu-eup	Approximately 590m
Gongri Tunnel	공리터널		Yanggu County	Yanggu-eup	Approximately 1650m
Gongri IS	공리교차로	Soyangho-ro	Yanggu County	Yanggu-eup	
Hakjo-ri IS	학조리사거리	Jipeungae-gil; Hakan-ro	Yanggu County	Yanggu-eup	
Jukri Elementary School (Daewol 2-ri IS)	죽리초등학교 (대월2리삼거리)	Bonghwasan-ro	Yanggu County	Nam-myeon	
Iri IS	이리삼거리	Baksugeun-ro	Yanggu County	Nam-myeon	
Songcheong IS	송청 교차로	National Route 31 (Geumgangsan-ro) (Chunyang-ro)	Yanggu County	Nam-myeon	
Dochon Elementary School	도촌초등학교	Guktojeongjungang-ro	Yanggu County	Nam-myeon	
Yongha 1 IS	용하1 교차로	Yangnam-ro	Yanggu County	Nam-myeon	
Nam-myeon Bus Terminal	남면버스터미널		Yanggu County	Nam-myeon	
Yongha IS	용하삼거리	Jeongjungang-ro	Yanggu County	Nam-myeon	
Nam-myeon Office	남면사무소		Yanggu County	Nam-myeon	
No name	(이름 없음)	Gwandaedumu-ro	Yanggu County	Nam-myeon	
Yanggu Tunnel	양구터널		Yanggu County	Nam-myeon	Approximately 230m
Yanggu Bridge	양구대교		Inje County	Nam-myeon	
Sinnam IS Sinnam Bus Terminal	신남삼거리 신남버스터미널	Sinnam-ro	Inje County	Nam-myeon	
Yumok IS	유목교차로	National Route 44 (Seorak-ro)	Inje County	Nam-myeon	National Route 44 overlap
Saema-eul IS	새마을교차로	Sidaekgol-gil	Inje County	Nam-myeon	National Route 44 overlap
Morubak IS	모루박교차로	Morubak-gil	Inje County	Nam-myeon	National Route 44 overlap
Bupyeong IS	부평교차로	Bupyeongjeongja-ro	Inje County	Nam-myeon	National Route 44 overlap
Bupyeong Bridge	부평교		Inje County	Nam-myeon	National Route 44 overlap
Cheonggu IS	청구교차로		Inje County	Nam-myeon	National Route 44 overlap
Namjeon Bridge Namjeon IS	남전교 남전교차로	Gwandaedumu-ro	Inje County	Nam-myeon	National Route 44 overlap
No name	(이름 없음)	Sinsangchon-gil	Inje County	Nam-myeon	National Route 44 overlap
Inje Bridge	인제대교		Inje County	Nam-myeon	National Route 44 overlap
Inje Tunnel	인제터널		Inje County	Inje-eup	National Route 44 overlap Right tunnel: Approximately 922m Left tunnel: Approximately 977m
Inje Public Stadium	인제공설운동장		Inje County	Inje-eup	National Route 44 overlap
No name	(이름 없음)	Bibong-ro	Inje County	Inje-eup	National Route 44 overlap
Hapgang IS	합강교차로	National Route 31 (Naerincheon-ro)	Inje County	Inje-eup	National Route 31, National Route 44 overlap
Deoksan IS	덕산교차로	Hanseoksan-ro	Inje County	Inje-eup	National Route 31, National Route 44 overlap
Bukmyeon IS	북면교차로	National Route 31 (Gwangchiryeong-ro); Prefectural Route 453 (Wontong-ro)	Inje County	Inje-eup	National Route 31, National Route 44 overlap
Seoho Bridge	서호교		Inje County	Buk-myeon	National Route 44 overlap
No name	(이름 없음)	Geumgang-ro	Inje County	Buk-myeon	National Route 44 overlap
Wontong IS	원통교차로	Wontong-ro	Inje County	Buk-myeon	National Route 44 overlap
Gwanbeol IS	관벌교차로		Inje County	Buk-myeon	National Route 44 overlap
Hangye IS	한계교차로	National Route 44 (Seorak-ro)	Inje County	Buk-myeon	National Route 44 overlap
Morangol IS	모란골교차로	Gowontong-ro	Inje County	Buk-myeon	
Gowontong IS	고원통교차로	Gowontong-ro	Inje County	Buk-myeon	
Hangye Tunnel	한계터널		Inje County	Buk-myeon	Approximately 1,272m
Yongdae Tunnel	용대터널		Inje County	Buk-myeon	Approximately 934m
Jeongjamun IS	정자문교차로	Gowontong-ro	Inje County	Buk-myeon	
Araetnam IS	아랫남교차로	Araennamgyo-gil	Inje County	Buk-myeon	
Witnam IS	윗남교차로	Araennamgyo-gil	Inje County	Buk-myeon	
Yongdae tourist attraction	용대관광지교차로	Manhae-ro	Inje County	Buk-myeon	
Baekdam IS Baekdamipgu Intercity Bus Terminal	백담교차로 백담입구시외버스터미널	Baekdam-ro	Inje County	Buk-myeon	
Yongdae IS Yongdae IS	용대교차로 용대삼거리	Prefectural Route 56 (Misiryeong-ro)	Inje County	Buk-myeon	
Yongdaeri Recreation Forest	용대리자연휴양림		Inje County	Buk-myeon	
Jinburyeong	진부령	Heulli-gil	Inje County	Buk-myeon	
Jinburyeong			Goseong County	Ganseong-eup	Border line
Gwangsan Elementary School	광산초등학교		Goseong County	Ganseong-eup	
Ganseonghyang Bridge	간성향교		Goseong County	Ganseong-eup	
Daedae IS	대대삼거리	Jinburyeong-ro	Goseong County	Geojin-eup	
Bukcheon Bridge	북천교		Goseong County	Geojin-eup	
Bukcheon IS	북천 교차로	Ganseong-ro	Goseong County	Geojin-eup	
Sangri IS	상리 교차로	National Route 7 (Donghae-daero)	Goseong County	Geojin-eup	Terminus

- Motorway section
  - Mancheon IC - Sinbuk IS
