= Bupyeong =

- Hangul: 부평
- Hanja: 富平
- RR: Bupyeong
- MR: Pup'yŏng

Bupyeong also refers to:

- Bupyeong, Incheon, an area of Incheon
- Bupyeong District, a district of Incheon
  - Bupyeong-dong, a neighborhood of Incheon
  - Bupyeong Station, a subway station located in Bupyeong District
- Bupyeong-dong, Busan, a neighborhood of Busan
