= National Route 42 (South Korea) =

Road in South Korea

National Route 42
- 국도 제42호선

Route information
- Length: 336.1 km (208.8 mi)
- Existed: 31 August 1971–present

Major junctions
- West end: Jung-gu, Incheon; Route 6 (continuation); Route 46 (concurrent with)
- East end: Donghae, Gangwon Province; Donghae Port

Location
- Country: South Korea

Highway system
- Highway systems of South Korea; Expressways; National; Local

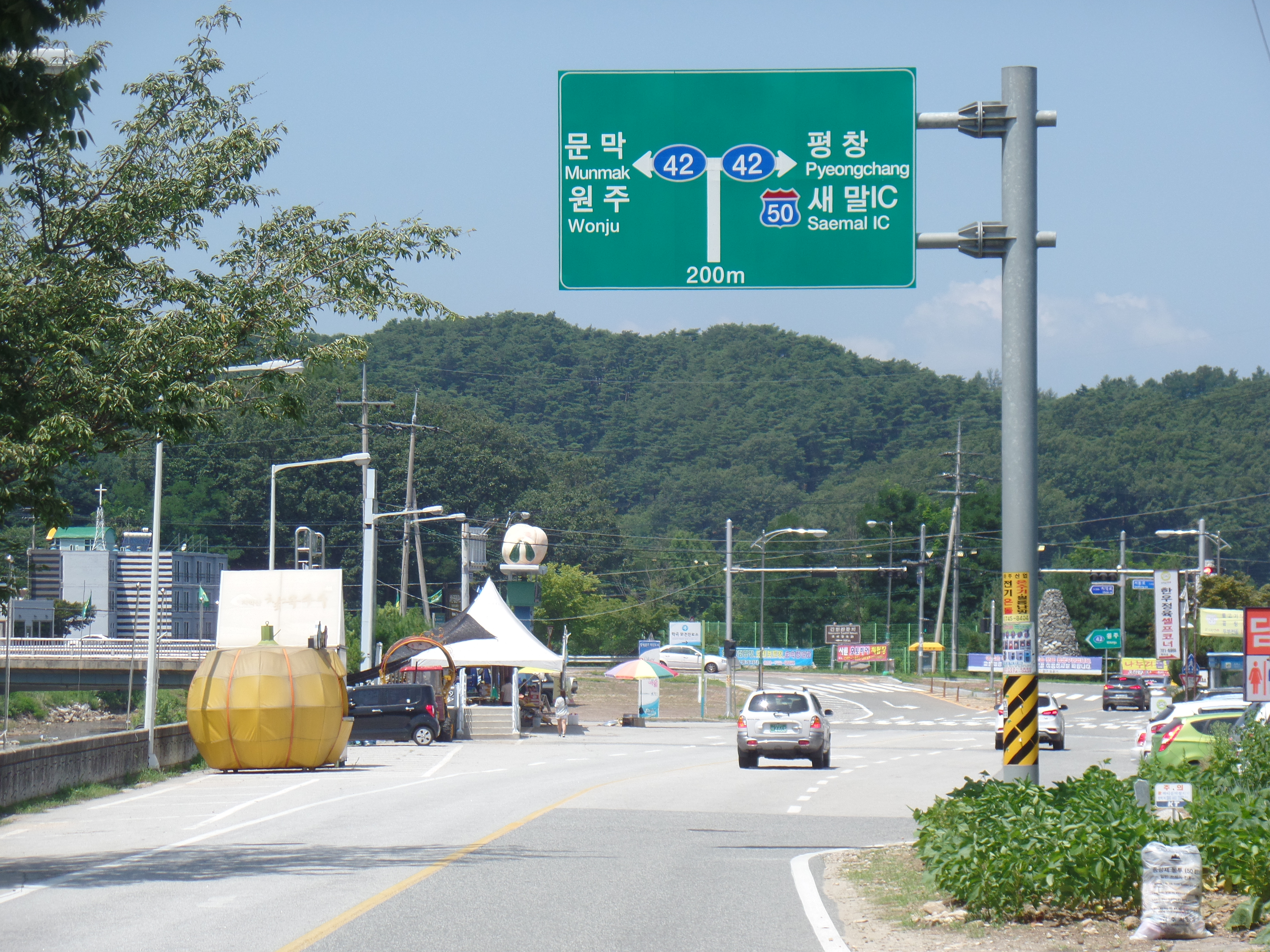
Hakgok Intersection in Wonju, Gangwon Province.

National Route 42 is a major highway in South Korea, connecting Incheon with the city of Donghae, Gangwon Province.

== History ==
- August 31, 1971: National Route 42, the Incheon–Bukpyeong Line, was designated under the General National Highway Route Designation Decree.
- September 19, 1972: Due to road route improvements, the road district of the 5.66 km section between Gugal-ri, Giheung-myeon, Yongin County, and Samga-ri, Yongin-myeon, was changed to 4.56 km.
- October 30, 1976: The 13.13 km section between Najeon-ri and Yeoryang-ri, Buk-myeon, Jeongseon County, was opened, while the existing 12.04 km section was abolished.
- December 30, 1976: The 46.7 km Suin Industrial Road section between Ganseok-dong, Incheon City, and Seodun-dong, Suwon City, was opened.
- February 22, 1980: The 1.64 km section between Yeoryang-ri and Yucheon-ri, Buk-myeon, Jeongseon County, was opened and the existing 1.84 km section was abolished. The 13.13 km section between Najeon-ri and Yeoryang-ri was also opened, while the existing 12.04 km section was abolished.
- March 14, 1981: The terminus was changed from Bukpyeong-eup, Samcheok County, Gangwon Province, to Donghae City, Gangwon Province. Accordingly, the route was changed from the Incheon–Bukpyeong Line to the Incheon–Donghae Line.
- May 13, 1986: The starting point was changed from Incheon City, Gyeonggi Province, to Jung District, Incheon Metropolitan City.
- March 16, 1994: The 10.0 km section including Metdunjae Tunnel, between Noron-ri, Pyeongchang-eup, Pyeongchang County, and Chang-ri, Mitan-myeon, was opened.
- July 15, 1994: The 21.5 km section between Yucheon-ri, Buk-myeon, Jeongseon County, and Imgye-ri, Imgye-myeon, and the 23 km section between Imgye-ri and Sinhung-dong, Donghae City, were opened.
- January 12, 1995: The 36 km Wonju–Anheung road between Taejang 1-dong, Wonju City, and Sangan-ri, Anheung-myeon, Hoengseong County, was opened.
- February 11, 1995: The 2 km section between Gimnyangjang-ri and Mapyeong-ri, Yongin-eup, Yongin County, and the 720 m section between Singal-ri and Gugal-ri, Giheung-eup, were opened.
- July 1, 1996: The starting point was changed from Jung District, Incheon Metropolitan City, to Jung District, Incheon Metropolitan City, under the city's current metropolitan-government designation.
- June 13, 1997: The 10.3 km section between Gyo-ri, Yeoju-eup, Yeoju County, and Bupyeong-ri, Gangcheon-myeon, was designated as an automobile-only road.
- December 27, 1997: The 14.42 km Yongin–Naesa road between Mapyeong-dong, Yongin City, and Ichi-ri, Majang-myeon, Icheon City, was widened and opened, while the existing 5.59 km section was abolished.
- May 1, 1998: The 17.32 km Icheon–Yeoju road between Sinha-ri, Bubal-eup, Icheon City, and Gyo-ri, Yeoju-eup, Yeoju County, was widened and opened, while the existing 9.65 km section was abolished.
- July 19, 1999: The 12.2 km section between Munmak-ri, Munmak-eup, Wonju City, and Dangye-dong was widened and opened, while the existing 9.65 km section was abolished.
- August 31, 1999: The 9.74 km Banwol–Suwon City Boundary road between Palgok-dong, Ansan City, and Guun-dong, Suwon City, was widened and opened.
- December 28, 1999: The 9.42 km section between Bupyeong-ri, Gangcheon-myeon, Yeoju County, Gyeonggi Province, and Geondeung-ri, Munmak-eup, Wonju City, Gangwon Province, was designated as an automobile-only road.
- December 31, 1999: The 10.3 km Yeoju–Gangcheon road between Gyo-ri, Yeoju-eup, Yeoju County, and Bupyeong-ri, Gangcheon-myeon, was widened and opened, while the existing 15.4 km section between Cheonsong-ri, Buknae-myeon, Yeoju County, and the Gangwon provincial boundary at Gangcheon-myeon was abolished.
- January 1, 2000: The 8.12 km section between Bupyeong-ri, Gangcheon-myeon, Yeoju County, and Geondeung-ri, Munmak-eup, Wonju City, was widened and opened, while the existing 7.035 km section was abolished.
- December 23, 2000: An 840 m section in Yangji-ri, Yangji-myeon, Yongin City, was widened and opened, while the existing 800 m section was abolished.
- April 10, 2001: The 11.7 km section between Saje-ri and Seogok-ri, Heungeop-myeon, Wonju City, was designated as an automobile-only road.
- January 7, 2002: The 7.46 km section between Bongsan-dong, Wonju City, and Jangyang-ri, Socho-myeon, was designated as an automobile-only road.
- August 3, 2002: The 7.4 km section between Gwanseol-dong and Bongsan-dong, Wonju City, was designated as an automobile-only road.
- September 30, 2003: A 640 m section in Sangan-ri, Anheung-myeon, Hoengseong County, was opened.
- December 31, 2004: The 3.35 km section between Hoeeok-ri and Pyogyo-ri, Majang-myeon, Icheon City, was widened and opened, while the existing 4.28 km section was abolished. The 3.4 km section between Yusan-ri, Hobeop-myeon, and Sinha-ri, Bubal-eup, was also widened and opened, while the existing 5.3 km section was abolished.
- July 13, 2007: The 3 km Yeoju Bypass between Hongmun-ri, Yeoju-eup, Yeoju County, and Wangdae-ri, Neungseo-myeon, was widened and opened.
- November 9, 2007: A 120 m former national highway section created during the 1993 improvement works on the Wonju–Anheung road was abolished.
- December 16, 2007: Following the opening of the Yeoju Bypass, the existing 2.54 km section between Wangdae-ri, Neungseo-myeon, Yeoju County, and Hongmun-ri, Yeoju-eup, was abolished.
- December 31, 2008: The 12.327 km section of the Wonju National Highway Bypass between Gwangteo Intersection and Gwanseol Intersection was opened.
- October 13, 2009: The 12.42 km section between Yeongdeok-dong, Giheung-gu, Yongin City, and Nam-dong, Cheoin-gu, was designated as an automobile-only road.
- November 1, 2013: The 9.11 km Jeonjae Pass section between Baekdal-ri, Ucheon-myeon, Hoengseong County, and Anheung-ri, Anheung-myeon, was newly constructed and improved, while the existing 10.11 km section was abolished.
- December 23, 2013: The 5.3 km Gwanseol–Bongsan road of the Wonju National Highway Bypass, between Gwanseol Intersection in Gwanseol-dong and Haenggu Intersection in Haenggu-dong, Wonju City, was widened and opened.
- January 16, 2014: Following the opening of the Wonju National Highway Bypass, the existing 13.25 km section through central Wonju, between Saje-ri, Heungeop-myeon, and Heungyang-ri, Socho-myeon, was abolished.
- November 30, 2015: The 14.94 km first and second sections of the Pyeongchang–Jeongseon road, between Noron-ri, Pyeongchang-eup, Pyeongchang County, and Gwangha-ri, Jeongseon-eup, Jeongseon County, were widened and opened.
- December 31, 2017: The 3.57 km Jeongseon Buk-myeon Bypass between Yeoryang-ri and Yucheon-ri, Yeoryang-myeon, Jeongseon County, was widened and opened, while the existing 3.61 km section was abolished.
- February 5, 2018: The 10.2 km third section of the Pyeongchang–Jeongseon road, between Gwangha-ri and Deoksong-ri, Jeongseon-eup, was widened and opened, while the existing 13.0 km section was abolished.
- November 30, 2018: The 12.54 km Yongin National Highway Bypass between Yeongdeok-dong, Giheung-gu, and Cheon-ri, Idong-myeon, Cheoin-gu, Yongin City, was widened and opened.
- December 31, 2018: The 6.7 km first section of the Yeongwol–Bangnim road, consisting of a 6.2 km section between Hupyeong-ri, Pyeongchang-eup, and Bangnim-ri, Bangnim-myeon, Pyeongchang County, and a 500 m section in Bangnim-ri, was widened and opened, while the existing 6.1 km section was abolished.
- December 29, 2020: Gungchon Intersection in Samga-dong, Cheoin-gu, Yongin City, was opened.
- July 18, 2022: The 11.66 km Wonju–Saemal road between Heungyang-ri, Socho-myeon, Wonju City, and Baekdal-ri, Ucheon-myeon, Hoengseong County, was improved and opened, while a 583 m section in Hakgok-ri, Socho-myeon, Wonju City, was abolished.

== Main stopovers ==
Incheon

- Jung District - Nam District - Namdong District

Gyeonggi Province

- Siheung - Ansan - Suwon - Yongin - Icheon - Yeoju

Gangwon Province

- Wonju - Hoengseong County - Pyeongchang County - Jeongseon County - Donghae

== Major intersections ==
- (■): Motorway

IS: Intersection, IC: Interchange

=== Incheon ===
Name	Hangul name	Connection	Location		Note
Incheon Station (Incheon Station IS)	인천역 (인천역사거리)	National Route 6 National Route 77; Prefectural Route 84; Prefectural Route 98 (Jemullyang-ro); Wolmi-ro; China town-ro 51beon-gil	Incheon	Jung District	National Route 46, National Route 77 overlap Prefectural Route 84, 98 overlap Terminus
Incheon Jungbu Police Station	인천중부경찰서		Incheon	Jung District	National Route 46, National Route 77 overlap Prefectural Route 84, 98 overlap Terminus
Jung District Office Entrance	중구청입구	Jemullyang-ro 218beon-gil	Incheon	Jung District	National Route 46, National Route 77 overlap Prefectural Route 84, 98 overlap Terminus
Dongincheon Registration Office	동인천등기소		Incheon	Jung District	National Route 46, National Route 77 overlap Prefectural Route 84, 98 overlap Terminus
Sinpo IS	신포사거리	Sinpo-ro; Jemullyang-ro	Incheon	Jung District	National Route 46, National Route 77 overlap Prefectural Route 84, 98 overlap Terminus
(1st Wharf Entrance)	(제1부두입구)	Injung-ro	Incheon	Jung District	National Route 46, National Route 77 overlap Prefectural Route 84, 98 overlap Terminus
Sadong IS	사동삼거리	Uhyeon-ro	Incheon	Jung District	National Route 46, National Route 77 overlap Prefectural Route 84, 98 overlap Terminus
2nd International Ferry Terminal Incheon Commercial Girls' High School E-mart Dongincheon Store	인천제2국제여객터미널 인천여자상업고등학교 이마트 동인천점		Incheon	Jung District	National Route 46, National Route 77 overlap Prefectural Route 84, 98 overlap Terminus
Suin IS	수인사거리	Seohae-daero	Incheon	Jung District	National Route 46, National Route 77 overlap Prefectural Route 84, 98 overlap Terminus
Singwang IS	신광사거리	National Route 77; Prefectural Route 84; Prefectural Route 98 (Jemullyang-ro); Dowon-ro	Incheon	Jung District	National Route 46, National Route 77 overlap Prefectural Route 84, 98 overlap Terminus
Sungui Rotary	숭의로터리	Dokbae-ro; Saetgol-ro; Seokjeong-ro	Incheon	Nam District	National Route 46 overlap
Jangan IS	장안사거리	Michu-ro	Incheon	Nam District	National Route 46 overlap
Nam District Office IS	남구청사거리	Dokjeongi-ro	Incheon	Nam District	National Route 46 overlap
Sungui IS	숭의삼거리	Chamoejeon-ro	Incheon	Nam District	National Route 46 overlap
Jemulpo Station (Jemulpo Station IS)	제물포역 (제물포역삼거리)	Subong-ro	Incheon	Nam District	National Route 46 overlap
Subong Park Entrance IS	수봉공원입구교차로	Subongbuk-ro	Incheon	Nam District	National Route 46 overlap
No name	(이름 없음)	Sukgol-ro; Juan-ro	Incheon	Nam District	National Route 46 overlap
Dohwa IC	도화 나들목	Gyeongin Expressway	Incheon	Nam District	National Route 46 overlap
Dohwa IC IS	도화IC교차로	Seokbawi-ro; Hannaru-ro	Incheon	Nam District	National Route 46 overlap
Juan IS	주안사거리	Jeil-ro	Incheon	Nam District	National Route 46 overlap
Old Citizens' Hall IS	옛시민회관사거리	Michuhol-daero	Incheon	Nam District	National Route 46 overlap
Seokbawi IS	석바위사거리	Gyeongwon-daero	Incheon	Nam District	National Route 46 overlap
No name	(이름 없음)	Guwol-ro	Incheon	Nam District	National Route 46 overlap
Incheon Gyeongwon Elementary School	인천경원초등학교		Incheon	Nam District	National Route 46 overlap
No name	(이름 없음)	Seoksan-ro	Incheon	Namdong District	National Route 46 overlap
No name	(이름 없음)	Munhwa-ro; Juan-ro	Incheon	Namdong District	National Route 46 overlap
Juwon IS	주원사거리	Yesul-ro	Incheon	Namdong District	National Route 46 overlap
Ganseok IS (Ganseogogeori Station Ganseogogeori Underpass	간석오거리 (간석오거리역) 간석오거리지하차도	National Route 46 (Gyeongin-ro); Namdong-daero	Incheon	Namdong District	National Route 46 overlap
Sangincheon Middle School	상인천중학교		Incheon	Namdong District	
Ganseok IS	간석사거리	Hogupo-ro	Incheon	Namdong District	
Mansu General Market Entrance	만수종합시장입구	Mansu-ro	Incheon	Namdong District	
Mansujugong IS (Mansu-dong Highway Gas Station)	만수주공사거리 (만수동하이웨이주유소)	Guwol-ro; Baekbeom-ro 124beon-gil	Incheon	Namdong District	
Incheon Insu Elementary School Incheon Water Promotion Hall Incheon Jangsu Elementary School	인천인수초등학교 인천물홍보관 인천장수초등학교		Incheon	Namdong District	
Jangsu IS	장수사거리	Munemi-ro	Incheon	Namdong District	Jangsu IC (Seoul Ring Expressway) Indirectly connected Seochang JCT (Yeongdong Expressway, Second Gyeongin Expressway) Indirectly connected
Chiyagogae IS	치야고개삼거리	Inju-daero	Incheon	Namdong District	
Unyeon IS	운연삼거리	Manuigol-ro	Incheon	Namdong District	Continuation into Gyeonggi Province

=== Gyeonggi Province ===
Name	Hangul name	Connection	Location		Note
Sincheon Overpass IS	신천고가사거리	Seohaean-ro	Siheung City	Sincheon-dong	Incheon - Gyeonggi Province border line
Sincheon Overpass IS	신천육교삼거리	National Route 39 (Hohyeon-ro)	Siheung City	Sincheon-dong	National Route 39 overlap
Sincheon IS	신천사거리	Sincheon-ro	Siheung City	Sincheon-dong	National Route 39 overlap
Bokeumjari Entrance IS	복음자리입구교차로	National Route 39 (Siheung-daero)	Siheung City	Sincheon-dong	National Route 39 overlap
Eunhaeng IS	은행사거리	Eunhaeng-ro	Siheung City	Eunhaeng-dong	
Anhyeon IS	안현 교차로	Mayu-ro	Siheung City	Eunhaeng-dong	
Maehwa-dong Community Center	매화동주민센터입구	Maehwa-ro	Siheung City	Maehwa-dong	
No name	(이름 없음)	Maehwa-ro	Siheung City	Maehwa-dong	
Geumi IS	금이사거리	Geumo-ro; Geumhwa-ro	Siheung City	Maehwa-dong	
Nongok IS	논곡삼거리	Gwangmyeong-ro	Siheung City	Mokgam-dong	
No name	(이름 없음)	Bakdal-ro	Siheung City	Mokgam-dong	
Mokgam IS	목감사거리	Dongseo-ro	Siheung City	Mokgam-dong	
Mokgam Underpass	목감지하차도	Mokgamuhoe-ro	Siheung City	Mokgam-dong	
Gurigogae (Janggunjae)	구리고개 (장군재)		Siheung City	Mokgam-dong	
Ansan International Business High School Ansan High School	안산국제비즈니스고등학교 안산고등학교		Ansan City	Sangnok District	
Jeongjae Elementary School IS	정재초교사거리	Sunhwan-ro	Ansan City	Sangnok District	
Jeil CC IS	제일CC사거리	Sinang-ro; Taemadang-ro	Ansan City	Sangnok District	
Seongpo IC IS	성포 나들목사거리	Samil-ro	Ansan City	Sangnok District	
Ildong IS	일동 교차로	National Route 39 (Jungang-daero)	Ansan City	Sangnok District	National Route 39 overlap
No name	(이름 없음)	Guryong-ro	Ansan City	Sangnok District	National Route 39 overlap
No name	(이름 없음)	Ansandaehak-ro	Ansan City	Sangnok District	National Route 39 overlap
Bukgogae IS	북고개삼거리	Yongsin-ro	Ansan City	Sangnok District	National Route 39 overlap
No name	(이름 없음)	Haean-ro	Ansan City	Sangnok District	National Route 39 overlap
No name	(이름 없음)	Banwol-ro; Geongeon-ro; Yongdam-ro; Geonjimi-gil	Ansan City	Sangnok District	National Route 39 overlap
Yangchon IC	양촌 나들목	National Route 39; National Route 47 (Seohae-ro)	Ansan City	Sangnok District	National Route 39 overlap
Yangchonma-eul IS	양촌마을앞 교차로	Prefectural Route 313 (Eosa-ro)	Ansan City	Sangnok District	
Dangsu IC	당수 나들목	Dangjin-ro	Suwon City	Gwonseon District	
East Ansan Dangsu IC	동안산당수 나들목	Pyeongtaek-Paju Expressway	Suwon City	Gwonseon District	
West Suwon IC	서수원 나들목	Prefectural Route 309 (Bongdam-Gwacheon Expressway)	Suwon City	Gwonseon District	
Guun IS (Seosuwon Intercity Bus Terminal)	구운사거리 (서수원시외버스터미널)	Seobu-ro	Suwon City	Gwonseon District	
Guun IS	구운오거리	Geumgok-ro; Guun-ro; Suseong-ro	Suwon City	Gwonseon District	
Utgeori IS	웃거리사거리	Guun-ro; Yeogisan-ro	Suwon City	Gwonseon District	
Nongjincheong IS (Rural Development Administration)	농진청삼거리 (농촌진흥청)	Geumho-ro	Suwon City	Gwonseon District	
Ministry of Land, Transport and Maritime Human Resources Development National Institute of Food Science and Technology	국토해양인재개발원 국립식량과학원		Suwon City	Gwonseon District	
Seodunmal IS (Seodun-dong Community Center)	서둔말삼거리 (서둔동주민센터)	Seoho-ro	Suwon City	Gwonseon District	
Seodun IS	서둔교차로	Sehwa-ro	Suwon City	Gwonseon District	
Yukgyo IS	육교삼거리	Seohodong-ro	Suwon City	Gwonseon District	
Yukgyo IS	육교사거리	Deokyeong-daero; Paldal-ro	Suwon City	Paldal District	
Suwon Station (Suwon Station Square IS)	수원역 (수원역광장교차로)	Prefectural Route 98 (Deokyeong-daero)	Suwon City	Paldal District	Prefectural Route 98 overlap
Maesan IS	매산사거리	Gatmaesan-ro	Suwon City	Paldal District	Prefectural Route 98 overlap
Maesan-dong Community Center	매산동주민센터		Suwon City	Paldal District	Prefectural Route 98 overlap
Docheon IS (Gyeonggi-do Office)	도청오거리 (경기도청)	Gohwa-ro; Hyowon-ro	Suwon City	Paldal District	Prefectural Route 98 overlap
Women's Hall IS	여성회관사거리	Maesan-ro 116beon-gil	Suwon City	Paldal District	Prefectural Route 98 overlap
Gyodong IS	교동사거리	Maesan-ro; Jeongjo-ro	Suwon City	Paldal District	Prefectural Route 98 overlap
Jungdong IS	중동사거리	Jeongjo-ro; Hyanggyo-ro	Suwon City	Paldal District	Prefectural Route 98 overlap
Yeongdong IS	영동사거리	Suwoncheon-ro	Suwon City	Paldal District	Prefectural Route 98 overlap
Jidong IS	지동사거리	Seji-ro	Suwon City	Paldal District	Prefectural Route 98 overlap
Catholic University St. Vincent Hospital	가톨릭대학교성빈센트병원		Suwon City	Paldal District	Prefectural Route 98 overlap
Dongsuwon IS	동수원사거리	National Route 1 National Route 43 (Gyeongsu-daero)	Suwon City	Paldal District	National Route 43 overlap Prefectural Route 98 overlap
Ingyeangol IS (Dongsuwon Hospital)	인계안골사거리 (동수원병원)	Jungbu-daero 170beon-gil	Suwon City	Paldal District	National Route 43 overlap Prefectural Route 98 overlap
Uman IS	우만사거리	Gwongwang-ro	Suwon City	Paldal District	National Route 43 overlap Prefectural Route 98 overlap
Gasangol IS	가산골삼거리	Jungbu-daero 223beon-gil	Suwon City	Paldal District	National Route 43 overlap Prefectural Route 98 overlap
Bangadari IS	방아다리삼거리	Jungbu-daero 246beon-gil	Suwon City	Paldal District	National Route 43 overlap Prefectural Route 98 overlap
Ajou University IS (Ajudae Intercity Bus Terminal)	아주대삼거리 (아주대시외버스정류장)	Aju-ro	Suwon City	Yeongtong District	National Route 43 overlap Prefectural Route 98 overlap
Jumakgeori IS	주막거리사거리	Maeyeoul-ro; Jungbu-daero 271beon-gil	Suwon City	Yeongtong District	National Route 43 overlap Prefectural Route 98 overlap
Court IS Suwon District Court	법원사거리 수원지방법원	Dongsuwon-ro	Suwon City	Yeongtong District	National Route 43 overlap Prefectural Route 98 overlap
Gwanteo IS (Woncheon-dong Community Center)	관터사거리 (원천동주민센터)	Maebong-ro; Jungbu-daero 345beon-gil	Suwon City	Yeongtong District	National Route 43 overlap Prefectural Route 98 overlap
Woncheon Bridge IS	원천교삼거리	Dongtanwoncheon-ro	Suwon City	Yeongtong District	National Route 43 overlap Prefectural Route 98 overlap
Nachonmal IS	나촌말삼거리	Jungbu-daero 448beon-gil	Suwon City	Yeongtong District	National Route 43 overlap Prefectural Route 98 overlap
Samsung Electronics IS	삼성전자삼거리	Heungdeok 1-ro	Suwon City	Yeongtong District	National Route 43 overlap Prefectural Route 98 overlap
Samsung IS	삼성삼거리	Samseong-ro	Suwon City	Yeongtong District	National Route 43 overlap Prefectural Route 98 overlap
Samsung IS		Samseong-ro	Yongin City	Giheung District	National Route 43 overlap Prefectural Route 98 overlap
Premium Outlets IS	프리미엄아울렛사거리	Jungbu-daero 56beon-gil	Yongin City	Giheung District	National Route 43 overlap Prefectural Route 98 overlap
Yeongtong Overpass IS (Yeongtong Entrance Intercity Bus Stop)	영통고가사거리 (영통입구시외버스정류장)	National Route 43 (Bongyeong-ro); Heungdeok 3-ro	Yongin City	Giheung District	National Route 43 overlap Prefectural Route 98 overlap
Heungdeok IS	흥덕 교차로	Heungdeok 4-ro	Yongin City	Giheung District	Prefectural Route 98 overlap
Kyung Hee University Entrance IS (Singal Yeongdeok Intercity Bus Stop)	경희대입구삼거리 (신갈영덕시외버스정류장)	Deokyang-daero	Yongin City	Giheung District	Prefectural Route 98 overlap
Suwon Singal IC (Suwon Singal TG IS)	수원신갈 나들목 (수원신갈TG삼거리)	Gyeongbu Expressway; Sinsu-ro	Yongin City	Giheung District	Prefectural Route 98 overlap
Singal Intercity Bus Stop	신갈시외버스정류장	Sinjeong-ro	Yongin City	Giheung District	Prefectural Route 98 overlap
Singal IS	신갈오거리	Prefectural Route 23 (Singal-ro); Singal-ro 58beon-gil	Yongin City	Giheung District	Prefectural Route 98 overlap
Singal Security Center IS	신갈치안센터사거리	Singu-ro	Yongin City	Giheung District	Prefectural Route 98 overlap
Green Cross IS	녹십자사거리	Gugal-ro	Yongin City	Giheung District	Prefectural Route 98 overlap
Giheung Station IS	기흥역사거리	Giheung-ro	Yongin City	Giheung District	Prefectural Route 98 overlap
Kangnam University IS (Kangnam University Station) (Kangnam University Underpass)	강남대삼거리 (강남대역) (강남대지하차도)	Gangnam-ro	Yongin City	Giheung District	Prefectural Route 98 overlap
Eojeong IS	어정삼거리	Eojeong-ro	Yongin City	Giheung District	Prefectural Route 98 overlap
Goindolma-eul IS Hanaro Mart IS Ajunaengjang IS Daewoo Apartment IS Jinheung Apartment Entrance Suwon-dong(Chwirakma-eul) IS Ssangyong Apartment Entrance Sangha-dong Injeong Prince A IS	고인돌마을사거리 하나로마트사거리 아주냉장삼거리 대우아파트삼거리 진흥아파트입구 수원동(취락마을)삼거리 쌍용아파트입구 상하동인정프린스A사거리		Yongin City	Giheung District	Prefectural Route 98 overlap
Sangha Bridge	상하교	Prefectural Route 315 (Saeun-ro)	Yongin City	Giheung District	Prefectural Route 98 overlap
No name	(이름 없음)	Dongbaekjukjeon-daero	Yongin City	Cheoin District	Prefectural Route 98 overlap
Samga IS	삼가삼거리	Samga-ro	Yongin City	Cheoin District	Prefectural Route 98 overlap
Samga Station IS	삼가역삼거리	Jisam-ro	Yongin City	Cheoin District	Prefectural Route 98 overlap
Yongin City Hall IS (Yongin City Hall) (City Hall–Yongin University Station)	용인시청삼거리 (용인시청) (시청·용인대역)		Yongin City	Cheoin District	Prefectural Route 98 overlap
Yongin University Entrance IS	용인대입구삼거리	Prefectural Route 321 (Yongindaehak-ro)	Yongin City	Cheoin District	Prefectural Route 98, 321 overlap
Registration Office IS	등기소앞사거리	Prefectural Route 321 (Seongsan-ro)	Yongin City	Cheoin District	Prefectural Route 98, 321 overlap
Myongji University Entrance IS	명지대입구사거리	Myeongji-ro; Jungbudae-ro 1299 beon-gil	Yongin City	Cheoin District	Prefectural Route 98 overlap
Tongil Park IS	통일공원삼거리	Geumnyeong-ro	Yongin City	Cheoin District	Prefectural Route 98 overlap
Culture & Arts Center Entrance IS Cheoin District Office IS	문예회관입구삼거리 처인구청후문사거리		Yongin City	Cheoin District	Prefectural Route 98 overlap
Terminal IS (Yongin Public Bus Terminal) (Yongin Overpass)	터미널사거리 (용인공용버스터미널) (용인육교)	National Route 45 (Baegok-daero)	Yongin City	Cheoin District	Prefectural Route 98 overlap
Dongbu IS	동부사거리	Prefectural Route 57; Prefectural Route 98 (Dongbu-ro)	Yongin City	Cheoin District	Prefectural Route 98 overlap
Mapyeong IS	마평삼거리	Geumnyeong-ro	Yongin City	Cheoin District	
Dongbu-dong Community Center IS	동부동주민센터사거리	Geumhwa-ro	Yongin City	Cheoin District	
Mapyeong IS	마평교차로	National Route 45 (Nambuk-daero)	Yongin City	Cheoin District	
Sambakgok Entrance IS Sinpyeong IS	삼박곡입구삼거리 신평삼거리		Yongin City	Cheoin District	
Songmun-ri Entrance IS Mountain Village Garden IS	송문리입구삼거리 산촌가든앞사거리		Yongin City	Cheoin District Yangji-myeon	
Namgok 2-ri Entrance IS	남곡2리입구사거리	Yangji-ro	Yongin City	Cheoin District Yangji-myeon	
Yongdong Middle School	용동중학교앞	Nampyeong-ro; Yangdae-ro	Yongin City	Cheoin District Yangji-myeon	
Yangji IC (Yangji IC IS) (Yangji Overpass)	양지 나들목 (양지IC사거리) (양지고가차도)	Yeongdong Expressway; National Route 17 (Jugyang-daero)	Yongin City	Cheoin District Yangji-myeon	
Pairo IS Jeil Elementary School IS Dongil Gas Station Chugye 2-ri Entrance IS Chugye 1-ri Entrance IS Chugye Mountain Villa	파이로교차로 제일초등학교사거리 동일주유소앞 추계2리입구삼거리 추계1리입구사거리 추계산장앞삼거리		Yongin City	Cheoin District Yangji-myeon	
Ocheon IS	오천삼거리	Ocheon-ro	Icheon City	Majang-myeon	
Yangchon IS	양촌삼거리	Prefectural Route 325 (Mado-ro)	Icheon City	Majang-myeon	Prefectural Route 325 overlap
Ocheon IS	오천 교차로	Prefectural Route 325 (Deokpyeong-ro)	Icheon City	Majang-myeon	Prefectural Route 325 overlap
Ocheon Tunnel	오천터널		Icheon City	Majang-myeon	Right tunnel: Approximately 457m Left tunnel: Approximately 480m
Ichi 1 IS	이치1 교차로	Seoicheon-ro	Icheon City	Majang-myeon	
Dodram IS	도드람 교차로	Seoicheon-ro	Icheon City	Majang-myeon	
Seolseo IS	설서삼거리	Jungbu-daero 609beon-gil	Icheon City	Majang-myeon	
Boreumdari IS	보름다리사거리		Icheon City	Majang-myeon	
Anpyeong IS Witdeul IS Angoni IS Yusan Logistics Complex IS Dalgaesil IS	안평삼거리 윗들사거리 안고니삼거리 유산물류단지사거리 달개실사거리		Icheon City	Hobeop-myeon	
Yusan IS	유산 교차로	Iseopdaecheon-ro	Icheon City	Hobeop-myeon	
Jangnok Rotary	장록 회전교차로	Prefectural Route 70 (Jinsangmi-ro)	Icheon City	Jungni-dong	Prefectural Route 70 overlap
Jangnok-dong IS	장록동삼거리		Icheon City	Jungni-dong	Prefectural Route 70 overlap
Gajwa IS	가좌삼거리		Icheon City	Bubal-eup	Prefectural Route 70 overlap
Bokha IS	복하 교차로	National Route 3 Prefectural Route 70 (Gyeongchung-daero)	Icheon City	Bubal-eup	Prefectural Route 70 overlap
Maam IS Bokha 2 Bridge IS	마암삼거리 복하2교사거리		Icheon City	Bubal-eup	
Bubal IS	부발사거리	Muchon-ro	Icheon City	Bubal-eup	
Muchon IS	무촌삼거리	Prefectural Route 337 (Hwangmu-ro)	Icheon City	Bubal-eup	
Sport Complex IS	종합운동장삼거리		Icheon City	Bubal-eup	
Bubal IS	부발 교차로	National Route 3 (Seongnam-Janghowon Motorway)	Icheon City	Bubal-eup	
No name	(이름 없음)	Buheung-ro	Icheon City	Bubal-eup	
Singeun-ri IS	신근리삼거리	Heungcheon-ro	Yeoju City	Heungcheon-myeon	
Neungseo IS	능서삼거리	Majang-ro	Yeoju City	Neungseo-myeon	
Beondo IS	번도삼거리	Majang-ro	Yeoju City	Neungseo-myeon	
West Yeoju IC	서여주 나들목	Jungbu Naeryuk Expressway	Yeoju City	Neungseo-myeon	
Yeongreung IS	영릉교차로	National Route 37 (Yeojubuk-ro); Prefectural Route 333 (Jungbu-daero)	Yeoju City	Neungseo-myeon	National Route 37 overlap
Wolsong IS	월송교차로	Prefectural Route 333 (Yeojunam-ro)	Yeoju City	Jungang-dong	National Route 37 overlap
Gyodong IS	교동 교차로	National Route 37 (Sejong-ro)	Yeoju City	Yeoheung-dong	National Route 37 overlap
Yeonyang IS	연양 교차로	Prefectural Route 345 (Junae-ro)	Yeoju City	Yeoheung-dong	
Iho Bridge	이호대교		Yeoju City	Yeoheung-dong	
Iho IS	이호 교차로	Gangmun-ro	Yeoju City	Gangcheon-myeon	
Ganmae IS	간매 교차로	Gangmun-ro	Yeoju City	Gangcheon-myeon	
Yeoju Tunnel	여주터널		Yeoju City	Gangcheon-myeon	Approximately 750m
Bupyeong IS	부평 교차로	Bupyeong-ro	Yeoju City	Gangcheon-myeon	
Bupyeong Tunnel	부평터널		Yeoju City	Gangcheon-myeon	Right tunnel: Approximately 478m Left tunnel: Approximately 446m Continuation into Gangwon Province

=== Gangwon Province ===
Name	Hangul name	Connection	Location		Note
Bupyeong Tunnel	부평터널		Wonju City	Munmak-eup	Right tunnel: Approximately 478m Left tunnel: Approximately 446m Gyeonggi Province - Gangwon Province border line
Daedun IC	대둔 나들목	Wonmun-ro	Wonju City	Munmak-eup	
Bangye IC	반계 나들목	Wonmun-ro	Wonju City	Munmak-eup	
Munmak Bridge	문막대교		Wonju City	Munmak-eup	
Munmak IC (Munmak IS)	문막 나들목 (문막사거리)	Yeongdong Expressway; Topyeong-gil	Wonju City	Munmak-eup	
Geondeung IS (Munmak Express Intercity Bus Stop)	건등사거리 (문막고속시외버스정류소)	Prefectural Route 49 (Wonmun-ro); Wanggeon-ro	Wonju City	Munmak-eup	
No name	(이름 없음)	Donggeon-gil	Wonju City	Munmak-eup	
Donghwagol IS	동화골삼거리	Donghwagol-gil	Wonju City	Munmak-eup	
Segogae IS	세고개삼거리	Botong-ro	Wonju City	Munmak-eup	
No name	(이름 없음)	Donghwagongdan-ro	Wonju City	Munmak-eup	
Botong IS	보통삼거리	Botong-ro	Wonju City	Jijeong-myeon	
Gwangteo IS	광터 교차로	Prefectural Route 88 (Gwangteo-gil) (Wonmun-ro)	Wonju City	Heungeop-myeon	
Daeancheon Bridge	대안천교		Wonju City	Heungeop-myeon	
Samseong IS	삼성 교차로	Seungandong-gil	Wonju City	Heungeop-myeon	
Daean IS	대안 교차로	Daean-ro	Wonju City	Heungeop-myeon	
Heungeop Tunnel	흥업터널		Wonju City	Heungeop-myeon	Approximately 156m
Heungeop IS	흥업 교차로	National Route 19 (Bukwon-ro)	Wonju City	Heungeop-myeon	National Route 19 overlap
Heungeop Bridge	흥업교		Wonju City	Heungeop-myeon	National Route 19 overlap
Seogok IS	서곡 교차로	Yongsugol-gil	Wonju City	Panbu-myeon	National Route 19 overlap
Gwanseol IS	관설 교차로	National Route 5 Prefectural Route 88 (Chiak-ro)	Wonju City	Bangokgwanseol-dong	National Route 5, National Route 19 overlap Prefectural Route 88 overlap
Bangok IS	반곡 교차로	Ipchun-ro	Wonju City	Bangokgwanseol-dong	National Route 5, National Route 19 overlap
Bangok Underpass	반곡지하차도		Wonju City	Bangokgwanseol-dong	National Route 5, National Route 19 overlap
Haenggu 1 Bridge	행구1교		Wonju City	Bangokgwanseol-dong	National Route 5, National Route 19 overlap
Haenggu 1 Bridge			Wonju City	Haenggu-dong	National Route 5, National Route 19 overlap
Haenggu IS	행구 교차로	Ungok-ro; Haenggu-ro	Wonju City	Haenggu-dong	National Route 5, National Route 19 overlap
Bongsan 2 Bridge	봉산2교		Wonju City	Bongsan-dong	National Route 5, National Route 19 overlap
Bongsan Tunnel	봉산터널		Wonju City	Bongsan-dong	National Route 5, National Route 19 overlap Approximately 870m
Bongsan Tunnel			Wonju City	Socho-myeon	National Route 5, National Route 19 overlap Approximately 870m
Heungyang IS	흥양 교차로	National Route 5 National Route 19 (Wonju Bypass Road)	Wonju City	Socho-myeon	National Route 5, National Route 19 overlap
No name	(이름 없음)	Chiak-ro	Wonju City	Socho-myeon	
No name	(이름 없음)	Bausil-gil; Jangsu 2-ro	Wonju City	Socho-myeon	
Socho IS	소초삼거리	Seombae-ro	Wonju City	Socho-myeon	
No name	(이름 없음)	Dundun-ro	Wonju City	Socho-myeon	
No name	(이름 없음)	Deokgo-ro	Wonju City	Socho-myeon	
Hakgok IS	학곡삼거리	Guryongsa-ro	Wonju City	Socho-myeon	
Saemal IS	새말교차로	Prefectural Route 442 (Hanu-ro)	Hoengseong County	Ucheon-myeon	
Moran IS	모란교차로	Bonghwa-ro	Hoengseong County	Ucheon-myeon	
Owon IS	오원교차로	Jeonjae-ro	Hoengseong County	Ucheon-myeon	
Jeonjae IS	전재교차로	Jeonjae-ro	Hoengseong County	Ucheon-myeon	
Jeonjae Tunnel	전재터널		Hoengseong County	Ucheon-myeon	Approximately 870m
No name	(이름 없음)	Jeonjae-ro	Hoengseong County	Anheung-myeon	
Anheung Tunnel	안흥터널		Hoengseong County	Anheung-myeon	Approximately 420m
Anheung IS	안흥삼거리	Prefectural Route 411 (Anheung-ro)	Hoengseong County	Anheung-myeon	Prefectural Route 411 overlap
No name	(이름 없음)	Prefectural Route 411 (Gangbyeon-ro)	Hoengseong County	Anheung-myeon	Prefectural Route 411 overlap
Munjae Tunnel	문재터널		Hoengseong County	Anheung-myeon	Approximately 630m
Ungyo IS	운교삼거리	Unji-ro	Pyeongchang County	Bangrim-myeon	
Meotdari IS	멋다리삼거리	Prefectural Route 420 (Gowon-ro)	Pyeongchang County	Bangrim-myeon	
Bangrim-myeon Office	방림면사무소		Pyeongchang County	Bangrim-myeon	
Bangrim IS	방림삼거리	National Route 31 (Pyeongchang-daero)	Pyeongchang County	Bangrim-myeon	National Route 31 overlap
Maetjae	뱃재		Pyeongchang County	Bangrim-myeon	National Route 31 overlap Elevation 470m
Maetjae			Pyeongchang County	Pyeongchang-eup	National Route 31 overlap Elevation 470m
Jujin IS	주진삼거리	Nonggongdanji-gil	Pyeongchang County	Pyeongchang-eup	National Route 31 overlap
Jujin Bridge	주진교		Pyeongchang County	Pyeongchang-eup	National Route 31 overlap
Dasu IS	다수삼거리	Okgogae-gil	Pyeongchang County	Pyeongchang-eup	National Route 31 overlap
Hupyeong IS	후평사거리	Salgusil-gil; Pyeongchangjungang-ro	Pyeongchang County	Pyeongchang-eup	National Route 31 overlap
Hari IS	하리삼거리	National Route 31 (Pyeongchanggang-ro)	Pyeongchang County	Pyeongchang-eup	National Route 31 overlap
Gun Office IS	군청앞사거리	Guncheong-gil	Pyeongchang County	Pyeongchang-eup	
Pyeongchang Intercity Bus Terminal	평창시외버스터미널		Pyeongchang County	Pyeongchang-eup	
Cheonbyeon IS	천변삼거리	Pyeongchangjungang-ro	Pyeongchang County	Pyeongchang-eup	
Pyeongchang Bridge	평창교		Pyeongchang County	Pyeongchang-eup	
Noron IS	노론삼거리	Gogilcheon-ro	Pyeongchang County	Pyeongchang-eup	
Maetdunjae Tunnel	맷둔재터널		Pyeongchang County	Pyeongchang-eup	Approximately 660m
Changri IS	창리삼거리	Prefectural Route 415 (Bamjae-ro)	Pyeongchang County	Mitan-myeon	
Mitan IS	미탄삼거리	Mitanjungang-ro	Pyeongchang County	Mitan-myeon	
No name	(이름 없음)	Mitanjungang-ro	Pyeongchang County	Mitan-myeon	
Baekun IS	백운삼거리	Pyeongchangdonggang-ro	Pyeongchang County	Mitan-myeon	
Bihaenggijae Tunnel	비행기재터널		Pyeongchang County	Mitan-myeon	Approximately 550m
Gwangha Bridge	광하교		Jeongseon County	Jeongseon-eup	
Solchi IS	솔치삼거리	Donggang-ro	Jeongseon County	Jeongseon-eup	
Yongtan IS	용탄삼거리	Prefectural Route 424 (Gariwangsan-ro)	Jeongseon County	Jeongseon-eup	Prefectural Route 424 overlap
Boksil IS	복실삼거리	Yongdam-gil	Jeongseon County	Jeongseon-eup	Prefectural Route 424 overlap
Jeongseon Information Technical High School	정선정보산업고등학교		Jeongseon County	Jeongseon-eup	Prefectural Route 424 overlap
Jeongseon Passenger Terminal	정선여객터미널		Jeongseon County	Jeongseon-eup	Prefectural Route 424 overlap
Hyundai Apartment IS	현대아파트삼거리	Yongdam-gil	Jeongseon County	Jeongseon-eup	Prefectural Route 424 overlap
Jeongseon 1 Bridge Is	정선1교삼거리	National Route 59; Prefectural Route 424 (Chilhyeon-ro)	Jeongseon County	Jeongseon-eup	National Route 59 overlap Prefectural Route 424 overlap
Gun Office IS	군청앞삼거리	Bongyang 3-gil	Jeongseon County	Jeongseon-eup	National Route 59 overlap
Eup Office	읍사무소앞	Bongyang 5-gil	Jeongseon County	Jeongseon-eup	National Route 59 overlap
Bongyang IS	봉양사거리	Jeongseon-ro; Bongyang 6-gil	Jeongseon County	Jeongseon-eup	National Route 59 overlap
Education Office (Jeongseon Office of Education)	교육청앞 (정선교육지원청)	Bibong-ro; Bongyang 6-gil	Jeongseon County	Jeongseon-eup	National Route 59 overlap
Jeongseon 2 Bridge IS	정선2교사거리	Noksong-ro; Jeongseon-ro	Jeongseon County	Jeongseon-eup	National Route 59 overlap
Deoksong IS	덕송삼거리	Nampyeonggangbyeon-ro	Jeongseon County	Jeongseon-eup	National Route 59 overlap
Najeon IS	나전삼거리	National Route 59 (Odaecheon-ro)	Jeongseon County	Bukpyeong-myeon	National Route 59 overlap
Bukpyeong IS	북평삼거리	Bukpyeongjungang-ro	Jeongseon County	Bukpyeong-myeon	
Bukpyeong Elementary School IS	북평초교삼거리	Tapgol-gil	Jeongseon County	Bukpyeong-myeon	
Jangyeol Bridge IS	장열대교삼거리	Jangyeol-gil	Jeongseon County	Bukpyeong-myeon	
Auraji IS	아우라지삼거리	Prefectural Route 415 (Nochusan-ro)	Jeongseon County	Yeoryang-myeon	
Auraji Bridge	아우라지교		Jeongseon County	Yeoryang-myeon	
Yeoryang-myeon Office	여량면사무소		Jeongseon County	Yeoryang-myeon	
Yeokjeon IS (Auraji Station)	역전사거리 (아우라지역)	Goyang-ro	Jeongseon County	Yeoryang-myeon	
Yeoryang Elementary School	여량초등학교		Jeongseon County	Yeoryang-myeon	
1st Yeoryang Bridge IS	제1여량교삼거리	Bongjeong-ro	Jeongseon County	Yeoryang-myeon	
Keunneogeunijae	큰너그니재		Jeongseon County	Yeoryang-myeon	
Songwon IS	송원삼거리	Bancheongoyang-ro	Jeongseon County	Imgye-myeon	
Jakeunneogeunijae	작은너그니재		Jeongseon County	Imgye-myeon	
Imgye IS	임계사거리	National Route 35 (Baekdudaegan-ro)	Jeongseon County	Imgye-myeon	
Imgye-myeon Office	임계면사무소		Jeongseon County	Imgye-myeon	
Imgye Bridge	임계대교		Jeongseon County	Imgye-myeon	
Hwacheon-dong IS	화천동삼거리	Hwacheondong-gil	Jeongseon County	Imgye-myeon	
Dojeon IS	도전삼거리	Nunkkonmaeul-gil	Jeongseon County	Imgye-myeon	
Galgogae	갈고개		Jeongseon County	Imgye-myeon	
Gamok IS	가목삼거리	Nunkkonmaeul-gil	Jeongseon County	Imgye-myeon	
Baekbokryeong	백복령		Jeongseon County	Imgye-myeon	
Baekbokryeong			Gangneung City	Okgye-myeon	
Nammyeonchi	남면치	Okgye-ro	Gangneung City	Okgye-myeon	
Sobi IS	소비 교차로	Hyoja-ro	Donghae City	Samhwa-dong	
Wonpyeong IS	원평 교차로	Hyoja-ro	Donghae City	Samhwa-dong	
Cheongun IS	청운 교차로	Cheongun-ro	Donghae City	Buksam-dong	
Bukpyeong IS	북평 교차로	National Route 7 (Donghae-daero)	Donghae City	Buksam-dong	
Donghae Port IS	동해항교차로	Daedong-ro	Donghae City	Songjeong-dong	Terminus

- Motorway sections
  - Wonju Bupyeong Tunnel ~ Munmak IC / Munmak IS
  - Wonju Gwangteo IS ~ Heungyang IS (Wonju Bypass Road)
  - Donghae Sobi IS ~ Cheongun IS
