= Seokcheon Sageori station =

Metro station in Incheon, South Korea

I222 석천사거리 Seokcheon Sageori
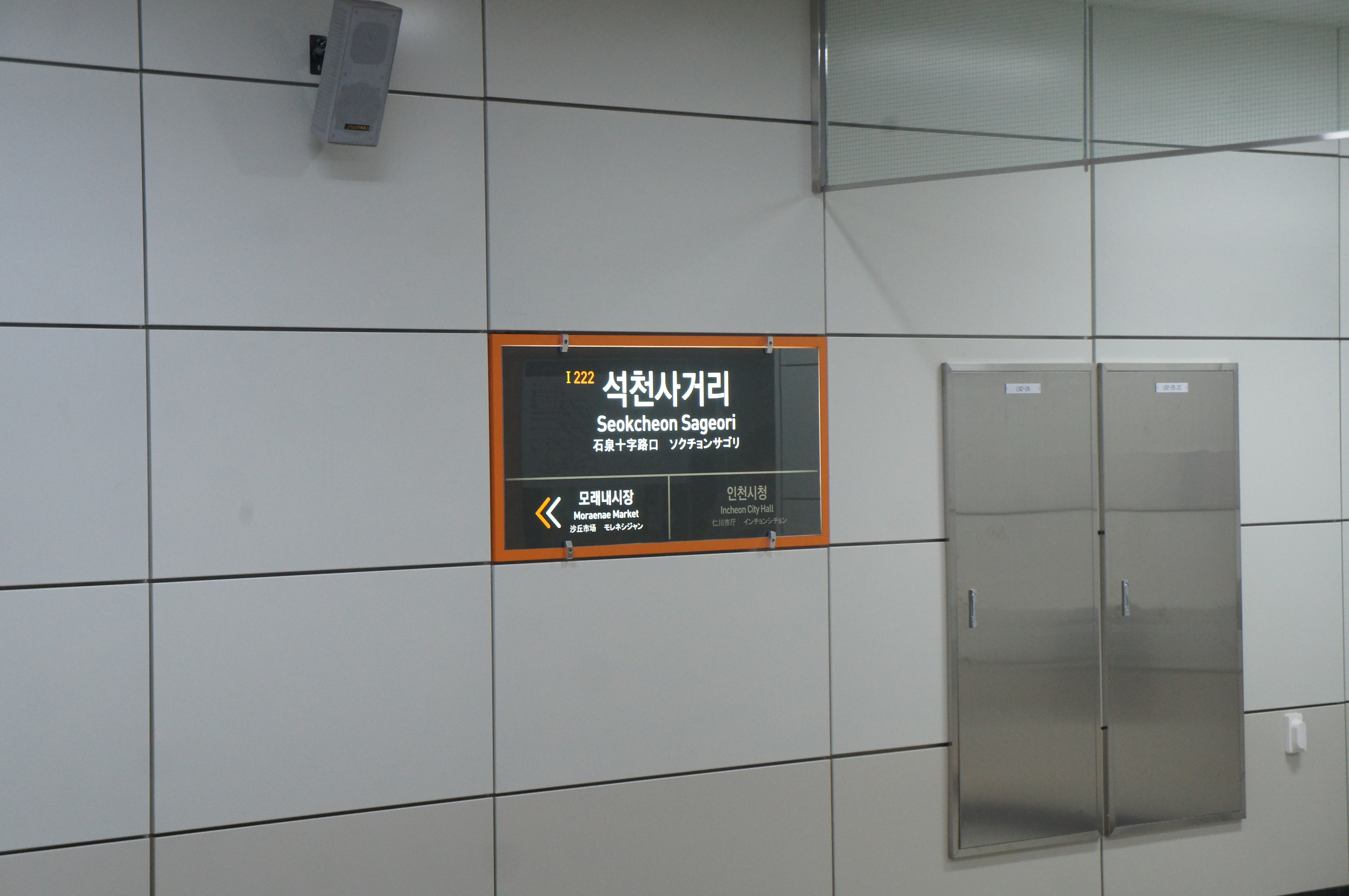

Korean name
- Hangul: 석천사거리역
- Hanja: 石川四거리驛
- Revised Romanization: Seokcheon sageori yeok
- McCune–Reischauer: Sŏkch'ŏn sakŏri yŏk

General information
- Location: 73-3 Guwol-dong, Namdong District, Incheon
- Coordinates: 37°27′24″N 126°42′39″E
- Operator: Incheon Transit Corporation
- Line: Incheon Line 2
- Platforms: 2
- Tracks: 2

Key dates
- July 30, 2016: Incheon Line 2 opened
Location

Seokcheon Sageori Station is a subway station on Line 2 of the Incheon Subway.

Preceding station	Incheon Subway	Following station
Incheon City Hall towards Geomdan Oryu	Incheon Line 2	Moraenae Market towards Unyeon
