= Bupyeongsamgeori station =

Metro station in Incheon, South Korea

I122 부평삼거리 Bupyeongsamgeori
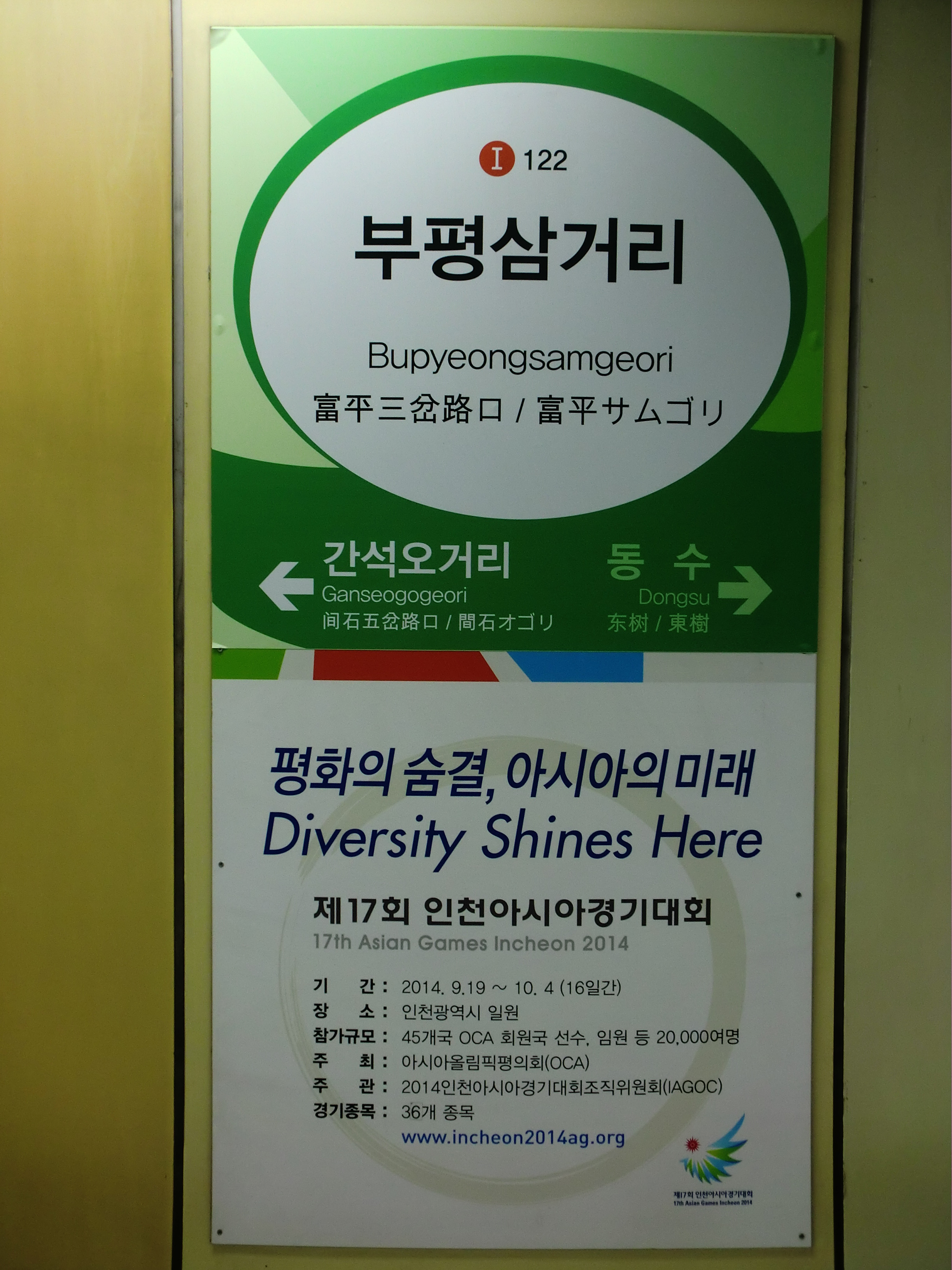
- Station Sign

Korean name
- Hangul: 부평삼거리역
- Hanja: 富平삼거리驛
- Revised Romanization: Bupyeongsamgeoriyeok
- McCune–Reischauer: Pup'yŏng-samgŏri-yŏk

General information
- Location: 770 Bupyeong-dong, 766 Gyeonginno Jiha, Bupyeong-gu, Incheon
- Coordinates: 37°28′39″N 126°42′37″E
- Operator: Incheon Transit Corporation
- Line: Incheon Line 1
- Platforms: 2
- Tracks: 2

Construction
- Structure type: Underground

Other information
- Station code: I122

History
- Opened: October 6, 1999

Passengers
- 2017: 5,415

Services
Preceding station	Incheon Subway	Following station
Dongsu towards Geomdan Lake Park	Incheon Line 1	Ganseogogeori towards Songdo Moonlight Festival Park
Location

Bupyeongsamgeori Station (Korean: 부평삼거리역) is a subway station on Line 1 of the Incheon Subway located in Bupyeong District, Incheon, South Korea.

== Station layout ==
G	Street Level
L1	Concourse	Faregates, Ticketing Machines, Station Control
L2; Platforms	Side platform, doors will open on the right
L2; Platforms	Westbound	← Incheon Line 1 toward Geomdan Lake Park (Dongsu)
L2; Platforms	Eastbound	→ Incheon Line 1 toward Songdo Moonlight Festival Park (Ganseogogeori) →
L2; Platforms	Side platform, doors will open on the right

== Exits ==
Exit No.	Image	Destinations
1		Seoul Sungjun Hospital
2		Incheon Gajok Park
3		Dongam elementary school
4		Jeil high school Incheon Gwangwang Hotel
