= Dongsu station =

Metro station in Incheon, South Korea

I121 동수 Dongsu
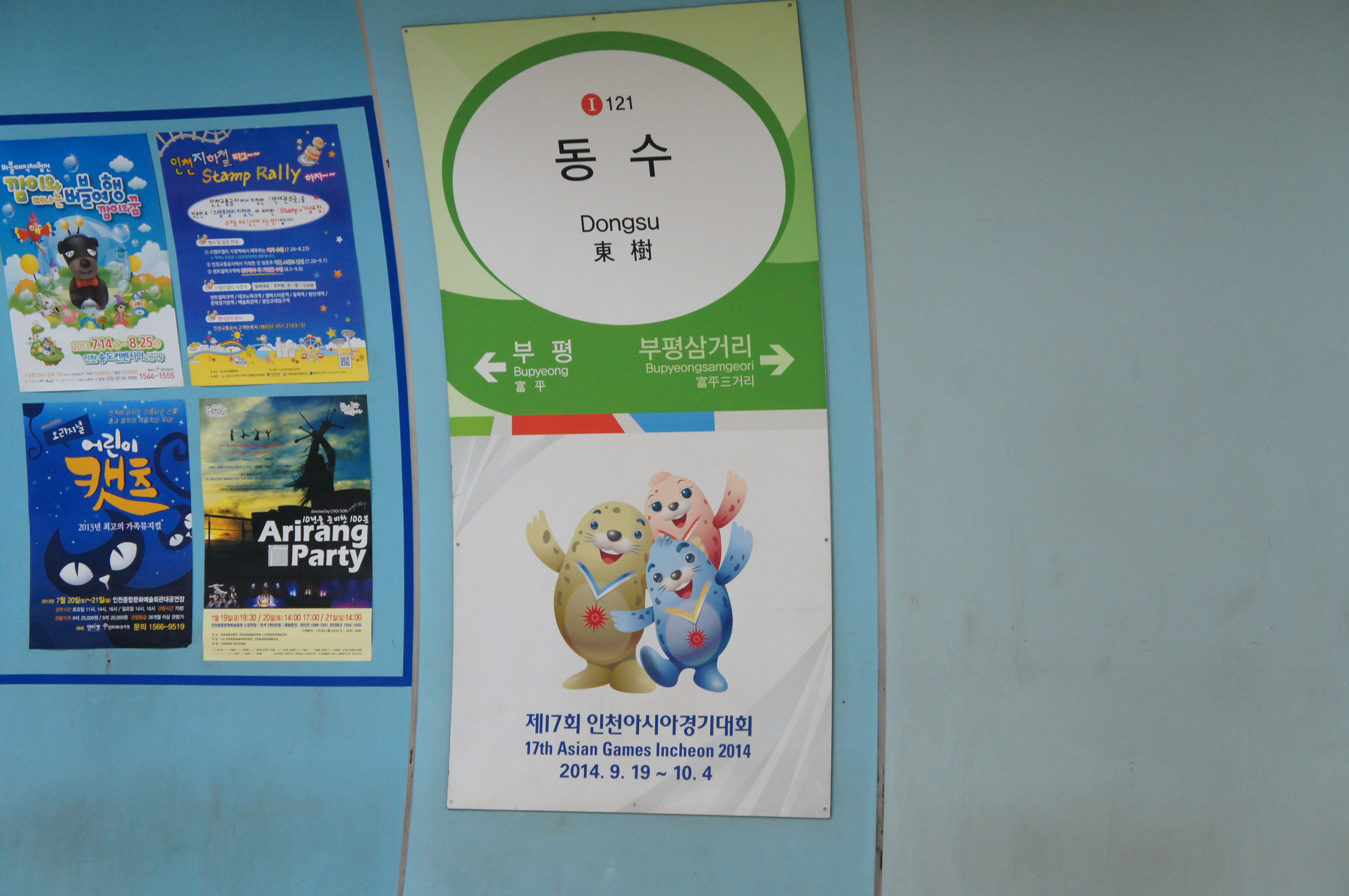
- Station Sign taken at the year of 2014

Korean name
- Hangul: 동수역
- Hanja: 東樹驛
- Revised Romanization: Dongsu-yeok
- McCune–Reischauer: Tongsu-yŏk

General information
- Location: 686 Bupyeong-dong, 888 Gyeonginno Jiha, Bupyeong-gu, Incheon
- Coordinates: 37°29′07″N 126°43′06″E
- Operator: Incheon Transit Corporation
- Line: Incheon Line 1
- Platforms: 2
- Tracks: 2

Construction
- Structure type: Underground

Other information
- Station code: I121

History
- Opened: October 6, 1999

Passengers
- 2017: 8,592

Services
Preceding station	Incheon Subway	Following station
Bupyeong towards Geomdan Lake Park	Incheon Line 1	Bupyeongsamgeori towards Songdo Moonlight Festival Park
Location

Dongsu Station (Korean: 동수역) is a subway station on Line 1 of the Incheon Subway located at 686 Bupyeong-dong, 888 Gyeonginno Jiha, Bupyeong District, Incheon South Korea.

== Station layout ==
G	Street Level
L1	Concourse	Faregates, Ticketing Machines, Station Control
L2; Platforms	Side platform, doors will open on the right
L2; Platforms	Westbound	← Incheon Line 1 toward Geomdan Lake Park (Bupyeong)
L2; Platforms	Eastbound	→ Incheon Line 1 toward Songdo Moonlight Festival Park (Bupyeongsamgeori) →
L2; Platforms	Side platform, doors will open on the right

== Exits ==
Exit No.	Image	Destinations
1		Sungmo Jaae Hospital; Police Academy
2		Seongdong school Yelim school Buil girls' middle school Sungmo Jaae Hospital; Police Academy
3		Bupyeong-2-dong office
4		Bupyeong Nam elementary school Lotte Mart
