= Bupyeong, Incheon =

- Hangul: 부평
- Hanja: 富平
- RR: Bupyeong
- MR: Pup'yŏng

Bupyeong (Korean: 부평; Hanja: 富平) is an area surrounding Bupyeong District, Gyeyang District, Seo District, part of Bucheon and Guro District, Seoul. Until 1914, Bupyeong was a separate county independent to Incheon.
