= Cheonho Bridge =

Cheonho Bridge 천호대교 Cheonho daegyo
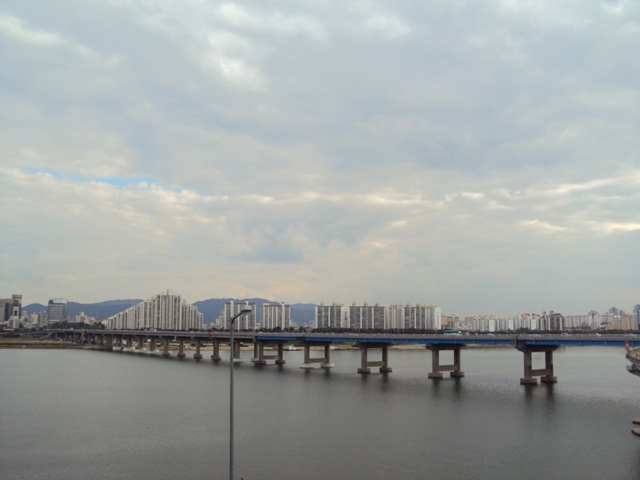
- Coordinates: 37°32′34″N 127°06′43″E
- Crosses: Han River
- Locale: Seoul, South Korea
- Other name(s): Cheonho Grand Bridge
- Preceded by: Gwangjin Bridge
- Followed by: Olympic Bridge

Characteristics
- Total length: 1,150 m (3,770 ft)
- Width: 25.6 m (84 ft)

History
- Constructed by: Dong Ah Construction
- Construction start: August 17, 1974
- Construction end: July 5, 1976

Statistics
- Daily traffic: 101,633 (2009)

The Cheonho Bridge (Korean: 천호대교; Hanja: 千戶大橋) crosses the Han River in Seoul, South Korea. It connects Gangdong District and Gwangjin District. The bridge was completed on July 5, 1976. The bridge was built to relieve the heavy traffic on the Gwangjin Bridge, but by 1986 the bridge was experiencing much traffic itself. This was resolved by building the Olympic Bridge in 1988.

== Gallery ==
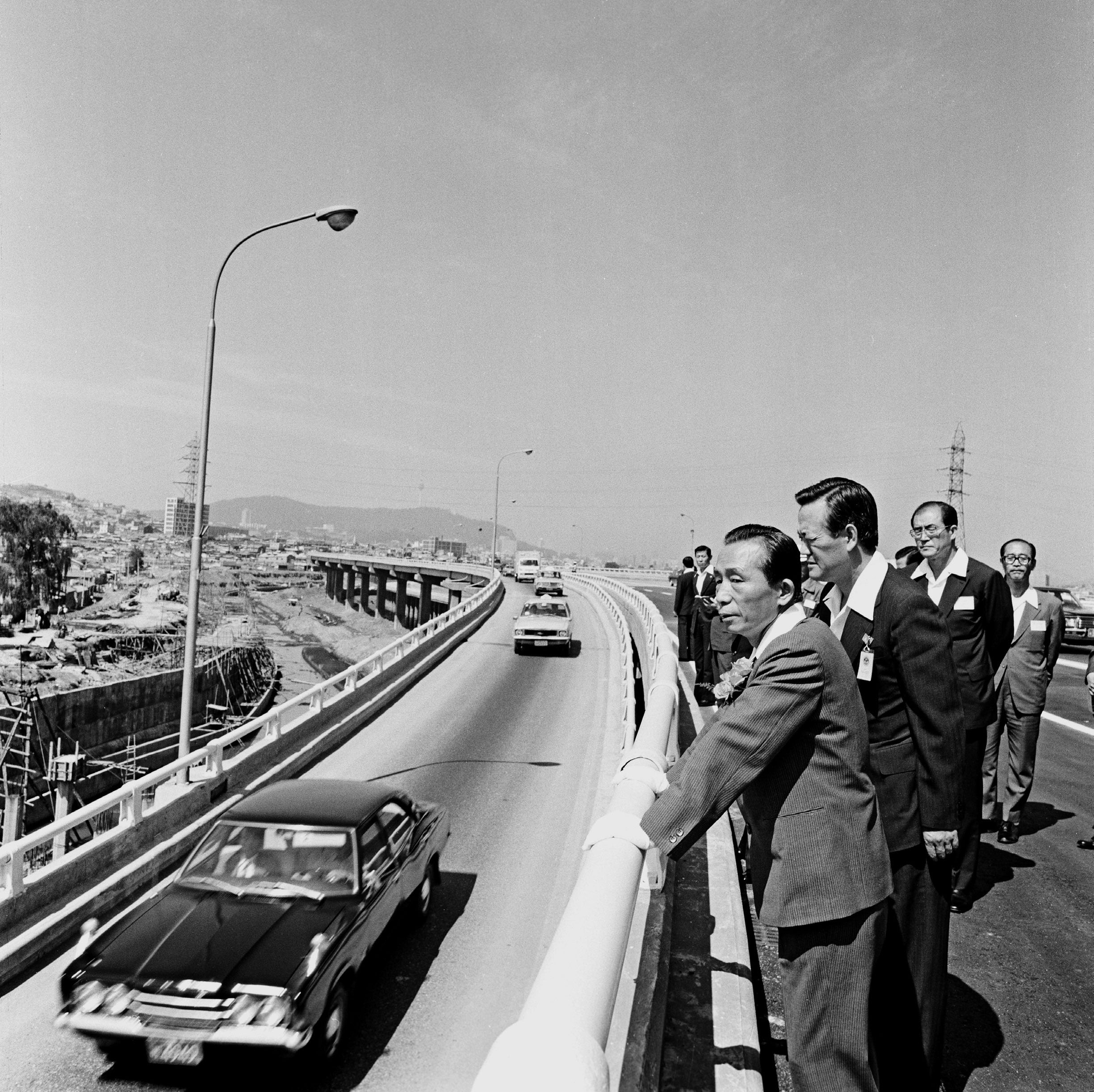
Then-president Park Chung Hee during the opening ceremony for the bridge
