= Incheon Grand Park =

Park complex in Incheon, South Korea

- 인천대공원
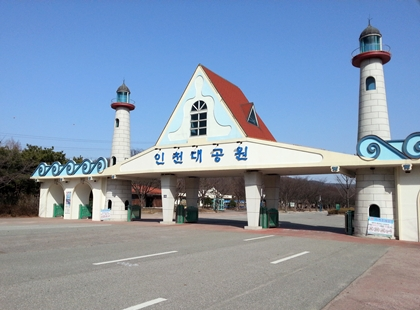
- Incheon Grand Park
- Interactive map of Incheon Grand Park
- Location: Namdong District, Incheon, South Korea
- Coordinates: 37°27′33″N 126°45′02″E
- Visitors: 4 million
- Status: Open all year
- Parking: Available

Incheon Grand Park (Korean: 인천대공원; Hanja: 仁川大公園) is a park complex in Namdong District, Incheon, South Korea. It was established in 1992. It is the biggest neighborhood park in Incheon with 4 million visitors each year.

== Facilities ==
There is a rose garden, arboretum, sculpture garden, sledding area, futsal court, camping site, soccer field, basketball court, archery range, dog park, inline skating rink, and children's playground. There are various walking trails in the park, including one where people are expected to walk on it barefoot.

- The zoo opened in 2001.
- The Future Environment Hall opened in 2007. It educates visitors on the seriousness of environmental pollution and a vision to overcome it.
- The arboretum opened in 2008.

== Photos ==
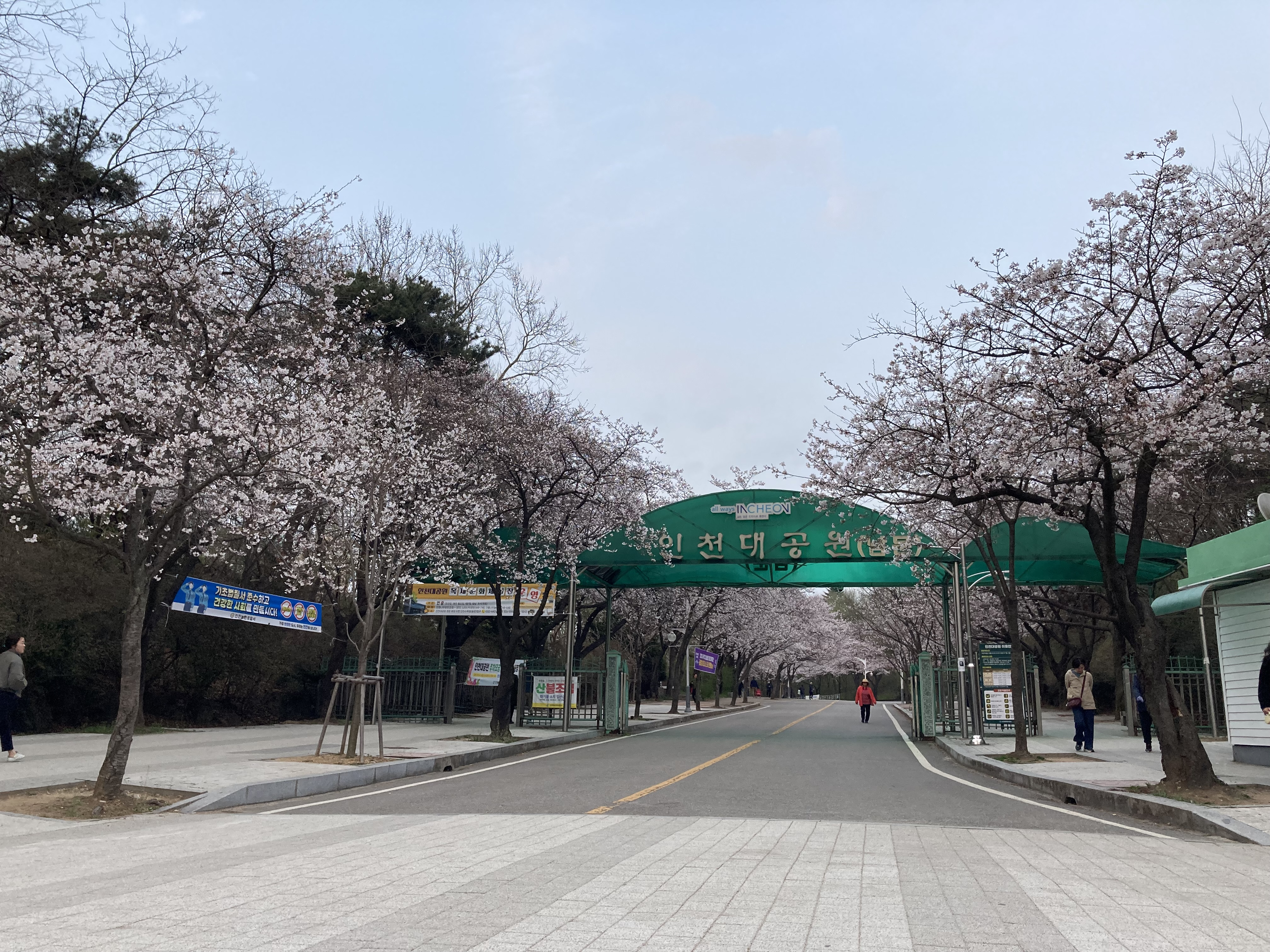
South Entrance

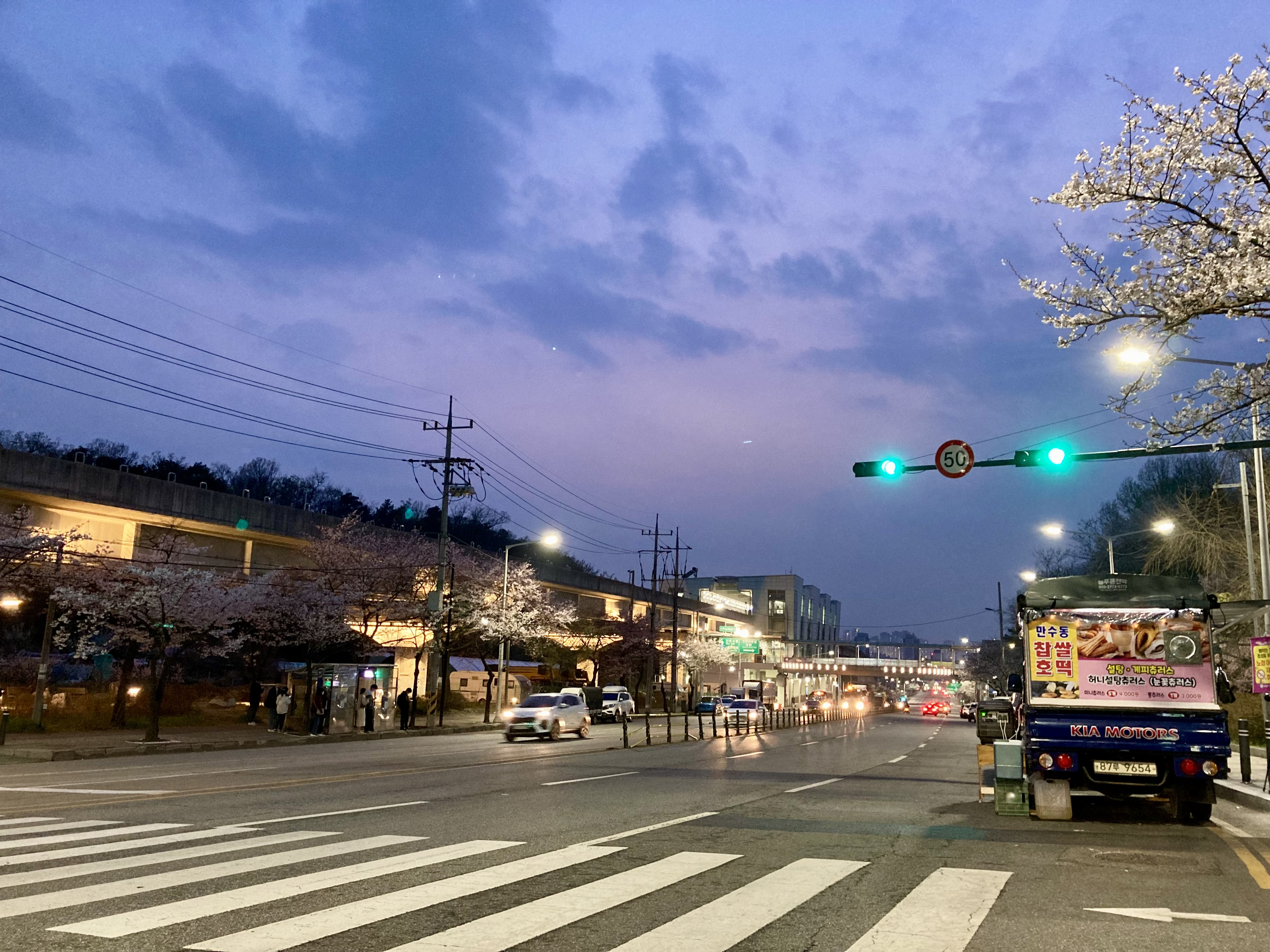
Incheon Grand Park Station

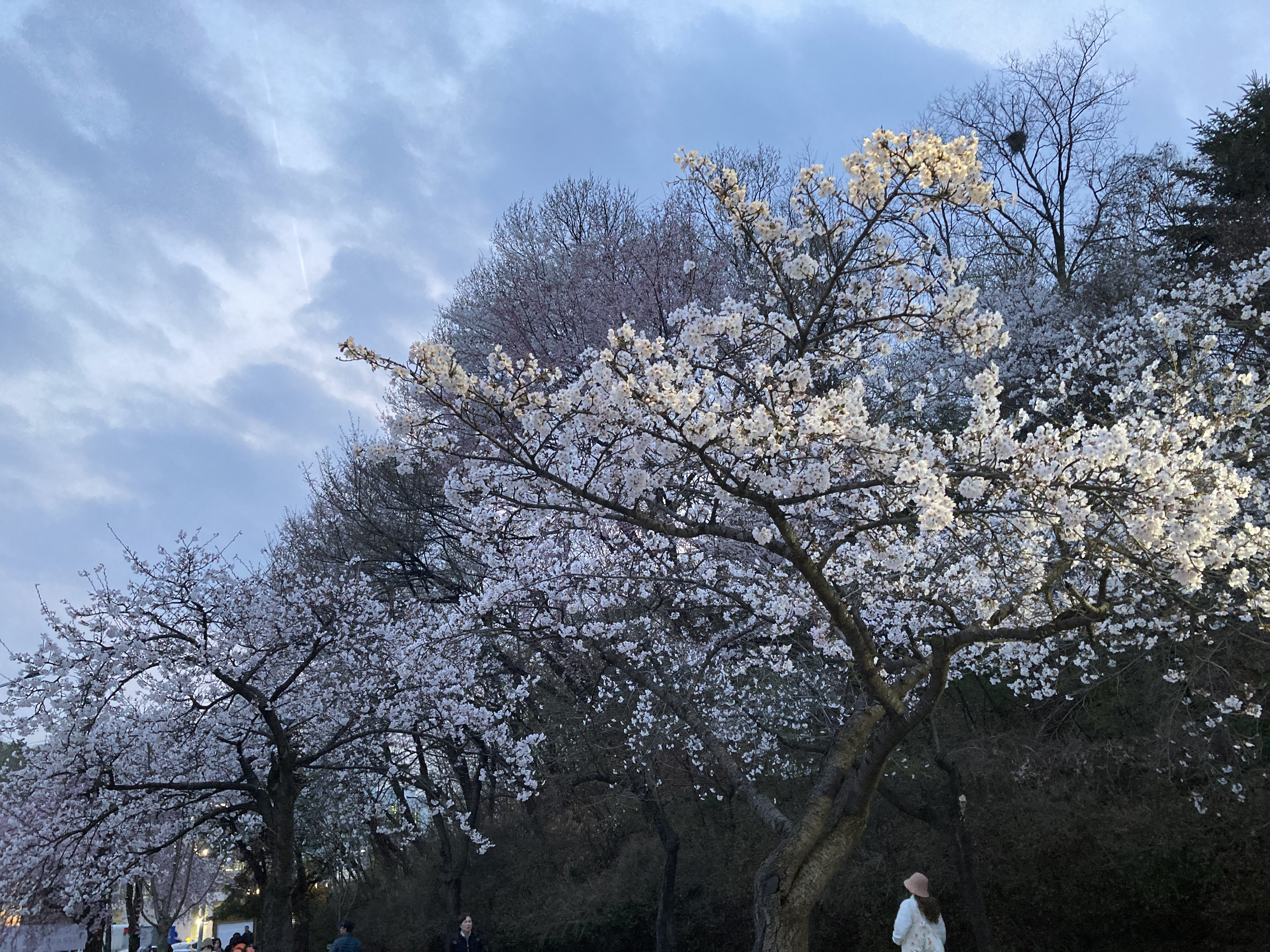
Night Tours

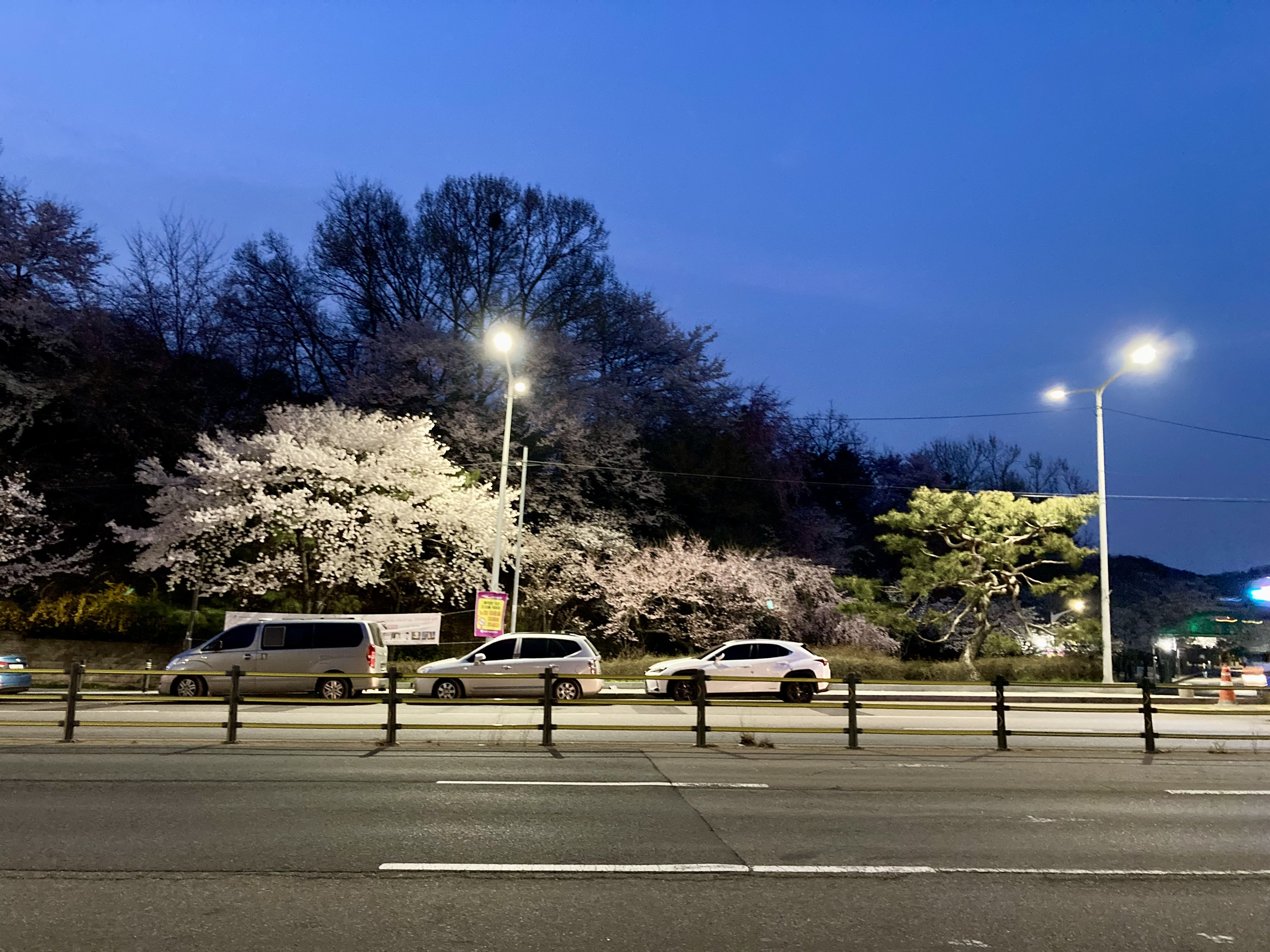
Bus Stops
