= Ganseogogeori station =

Metro station in Incheon, South Korea

I123 간석오거리 Ganseogogeori
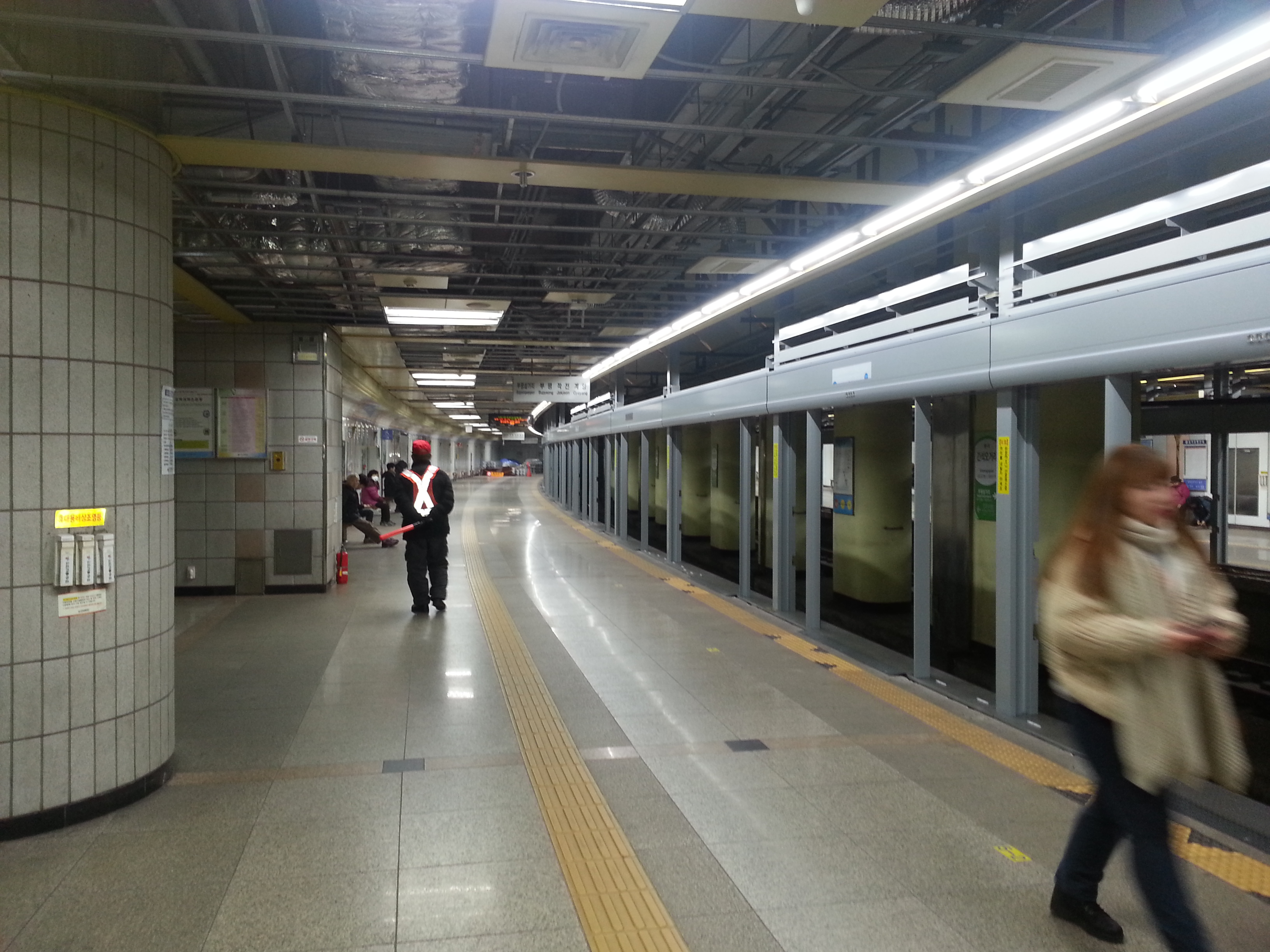

Korean name
- Hangul: 간석오거리역
- Hanja: 間石五거리驛
- Revised Romanization: Ganseogogeoriyeok
- McCune–Reischauer: Kansŏgogŏriyŏk

General information
- Location: 239-3 Ganseok-dong, Jiha642, Gyeonginno, Namdong-gu, Incheon
- Coordinates: 37°28′01″N 126°42′29″E
- Operator: Incheon Transit Corporation
- Line: Incheon Line 1
- Platforms: 2
- Tracks: 2

Construction
- Structure type: Underground

Other information
- Station code: I123

History
- Opened: October 6, 1999

Passengers
- 2017: 22,668

Services
Preceding station	Incheon Subway	Following station
Bupyeongsamgeori towards Geomdan Lake Park	Incheon Line 1	Incheon City Hall towards Songdo Moonlight Festival Park
Location

Ganseogogeori Station (Korean: 간석오거리역) is a subway station on Line 1 of the Incheon Subway located at 239-3 Ganseok-dong, Jiha642, Gyeonginno, Namdong-gu, Incheon South Korea.

== Station layout ==
G	Street Level	Exits
L1	Concourse	Faregates, Ticketing Machines, Station Control
L2; Platforms	Side platform, doors will open on the right
L2; Platforms	Westbound	← Incheon Line 1 toward Geomdan Lake Park (Bupyeongsamgeori)
L2; Platforms	Eastbound	→ Incheon Line 1 toward Songdo Moonlight Festival Park (Incheon City Hall) →
L2; Platforms	Side platform, doors will open on the right

== Exits ==
Exit No.	Image	Destinations
1		Incheon Transit Corporation; Sinmyeong girls' high school Ganseok girls' high school
2		Mokhwa Wedding Hall
3		Ganseok-dong post office Royal Hotel; Sang Incheon middle school Inje middle school
4		Olive department store
5		Robert Hotel
6		Ganseok fire station
7		Sae Heemang Hospital
8		Saemaeul Geumgo
9		Dongam elementary school
