= Gwangjin Bridge =

Bridge in Seoul, South Korea

Coordinates: 37°32′41″N 127°06′47″E

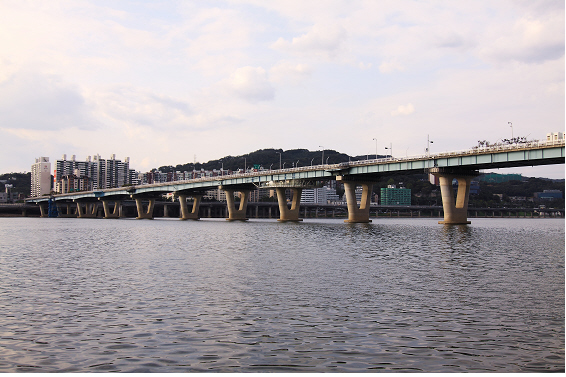

Korean name
- Hangul: 광진교
- Hanja: 廣津橋
- RR: Gwangjingyo
- MR: Kwangjin'gyo

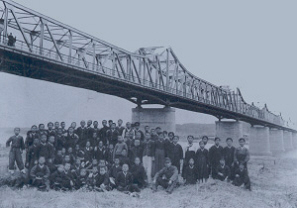
Original bridge in 1937

The Gwangjin Bridge (Korean: 광진교) crosses the Han River in South Korea and connects the districts of Gwangjin-gu and Gangdong-gu. The original bridge was completed in 1936, but because of deteriorating conditions, it was rebuilt and reopened in November 2003.
