= Bupyeong-dong =

Coordinates: 37°30′N 126°43′E

- Hangul: 부평동
- Hanja: 富平洞
- RR: Bupyeong-dong
- MR: Pup'yŏng-dong

Bupyeong-dong (Korean: 부평동) is a dong (neighborhood) of Bupyeong District, Incheon, South Korea. It is officially divided into Bupyeong-1-dong, Bupyeong-2-dong, Bupyeong-3-dong, Bupyeong-4-dong, Bupyeong-5-dong, and Bupyeong-6-dong.
