= Bupyeong District =

District of Incheon, South Korea

Coordinates: 37.507°N 126.722°E

Bupyeong
- Autonomous District
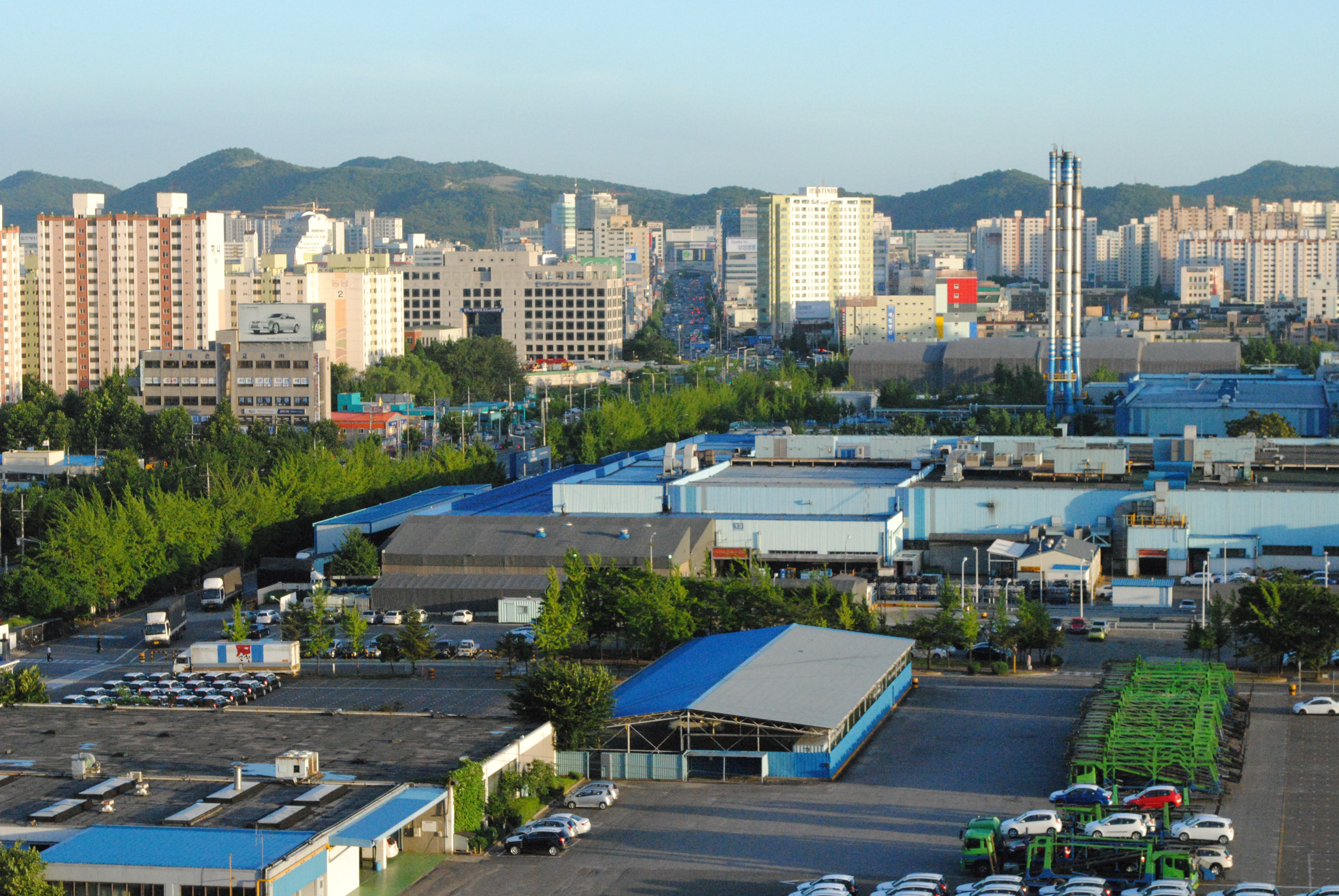

- Flag

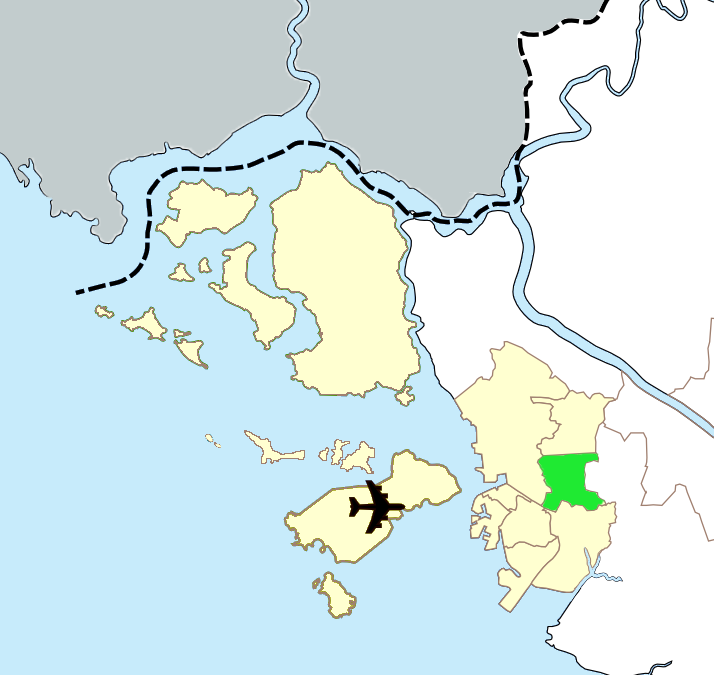
- Country: South Korea
- Region: Sudogwon
- Provincial level: Incheon

Area
  - Total: 32.00 km^{2} (12.36 sq mi)

Population (September 2024)
  - Total: 493,253
  - Density: 15,410/km^{2} (39,920/sq mi)
  - Dialect: Seoul
- Website: Bupyeong District Office

Korean name
- Hangul: 부평구
- Hanja: 富平區
- RR: Bupyeong-gu
- MR: Pup'yŏng-gu

Bupyeong District (Korean: 부평구) is one of the 10 administrative divisions (eight municipal districts and two counties) that comprise Incheon, South Korea. Bupyeong District comprises an area of 12.35 square miles (31.98 square km), and has a population of 508,587. It is located north of Namdong District, east of Seo District, and south of Gyeyang District. The city of Bucheon, in neighboring Gyeonggi Province, comprises its eastern limit.

== History ==
Bupyeong District was created as its own district in 1995 when 'Buk-gu' was split into 'Gyeyang District' and 'Bupyeong District' due to rapid growth in the region. Before the 1970s, much of the area was rich farmland. However, with rapid industrial development and the construction of large apartment complexes, the farmland quickly disappeared leaving what is today a large urban district.

=== History of "old Bupyeong" ===
Old Bupyeong was an administrative district, distinctive from Incheon, before 1914, when the Japanese colonial government merged it with outer parts of old Incheon into Bucheon County. Bupyeong Metropolitan Prefecture (i.e. Buyeong Dohobu, 부평도호부) consisted of today's Bupyeong District, Gyeyang District, Seo District (excepting Geomdan) in Incheon, Bucheon in Gyeonggi Province, and western part of Guro District, Seoul. In 1895, Bupyeong Metropolitan Prefecture was degraded to Bupyeong County. The city centre was in Gyesan-dong, Gyeyang District. The two remaining buildings of the Bupyeong prefecture office are located in Bupyeong Elementary School.

Only Sipjeong-dong was part of Juan township of old Incheon, other than old Bupyeong.

Old Bupyeong was traditionally a district of higher hierarchy than old Incheon in the administrative district system before Incheon became a metropolitan prefecture in early Joseon, and was a military centre for coastal Gyeonggi area, covering old Incheon, Tongjin, Gimpo, Yangcheon, Ansan, Siheung, Gwacheon, and so on.

- January 1, 1968 Establishment of Buk-gu, Incheon, Gyeonggi-do.
- July 1, 1981 Buk-gu, Incheon Direct Control City
- January 1, 1988 Transfer of its western parts such as Geomam-dong and Yeonhui-dong to Seo-gu.
- May 1, 1988 Elevated to autonomous district.
- January 1, 1989 Gyeyang-myeon, Gimpo-gun, Gyeonggi-do included in Buk-gu.
- January 1, 1995 Buk-gu, Incheon Metropolitan City
- March 1, 1995 Name change from Buk-gu to Bupyeong District, and creation of Gyeyang District by dividing part of Bupyeong District.
- April 20, 2006 Sub-division of Samsan-dong to Samsan-1-dong and Samsan-2-dong.

== Overview ==
At the core of the district is Bupyeong Station. The station lies at the intersection of the Incheon Subway Line 1 and Seoul Subway Line 1, instantly making it one of the busiest subway stations in all of Korea. It is also possible to reach Bupyeong-Gu Office via Seoul Subway Line 7 and Incheon Subway Line 1.

The area around Bupyeong Station includes the Bupyeong Underground Market, which boasts hundreds of small shops selling mostly clothing and make-up, and the Bupyeong Cultural Street, a walking street which holds several performances and cultural events throughout the year. The area also contains many restaurants and bars, making it a popular weekend destination for residents of Incheon. Nearby is Bupyeong Market, a large traditional market where vendors sell fresh meat, produce, and traditional medicine.

Daewoo Motors which is now GM Korea is a subsidiary of largest American automotive manufacturer General Motors, has its company headquarters and is the largest automobile manufacturing plant in Bupyeong. The GM Korea Design Center, which is said to "play an important role in GM's Global Design organization," is located there.

Incheon's professional basketball team, the ET Land Elephants, plays at Samsan Gymnasium in Bupyeong.

=== Camp Market ===
Bupyeong District is also home to Camp Market, a small United States Army depot.

== Administrative divisions ==
Administrative divisions

The administrative divisions of Bupyeong District consist of 22 dongs. Bupyeong District is approximately 3.09% of the area of Incheon with an area of 31.98 km^{2}.

Administrative Division	Chinese characters	Area (km^{2})	Households	Population
Bupyeong-(1)il-dong	富平1洞	1.10	13,192	35,399
Bupyeong-(2)i-dong	富平2洞	2.28	9,228	22,519
Bupyeong-(3)sam-dong	富平3洞	1.00	6,784	15,677
Bupyeong-(4)sa-dong	富平4洞	1.04	11,903	26,760
Bupyeong-(5)o-dong	富平5洞	0.83	10,765	25,355
Bupyeong-(6)ryuk-dong	富平6洞	0.76	7,083	16,500
Sangok-(1)il-dong	山谷1洞	2.07	8,369	20,400
Sangok-(2)i-dong	山谷2洞	0.92	11,221	35,934
Sangok-(3)sam-dong	山谷3洞	1.43	9,290	26,408
Sangok-(4)sa-dong	山谷4洞	0.76	6,773	20,566
Cheongcheon-(1)-il-dong	淸川1洞	2.16	7,361	16,768
Cheongcheon-(2)-i-dong	淸川2洞	2.78	13,719	37,871
Galsan-(1)il-dong	葛山1洞	1.07	7,072	18,855
Galsan-(2)i-dong	葛山2洞	0.66	8,608	23,482
Samsan-(1)il-dong	三山1洞	2.13	14,837	41,582
Samsan-(2)i-dong	三山2洞	1.26	10,249	32,102
Bugae-(1)-il-dong	富開1洞	0.95	8,108	20,607
Bugae-(2)-i-dong	富開2洞	0.75	9,061	24,971
Bugae-(3)-sam-dong	富開3洞	0.86	12,814	37,834
Ilsin-dong	日新洞	4.30	5,336	15,014
Shipjeong(1)il-dong	十井1洞	1.79	8,876	22,439
Shipjeong(2)i-dong	十井2洞	1.09	12,476	29,750
Bupyeong District	富平區	31.99	213,125	566,793

== Sister Cities and Regions ==
- South Korea
1. Nam District, Daegu
2. Gwangju
3. Yuseong District, Daejeon
4. Ulsan
5. Pyeongchang County, Gangwon Province
6. Chungju, North Chungcheong Province
7. Geumsan County, South Chungcheong Province
8. Gunwi County, North Gyeongsang Province
9. Goseong County, South Gyeongsang Province
10. Muju County, North Jeolla Province
11. Wando County, South Jeolla Province
12. Seogwipo, Jeju Special Self-Governing Province
- United States Jackson County, Oregon
- Laos Udomphon,

== Notable people from Bupyeong District ==
- Park Ji-sun, South Korean comedian and actress
- Doyeon, singer, dancer, actress and K-pop idol, member of K-pop girlgroups Weki Meki and WJMK
- Kei, singer, dancer, actress and K-pop idol, member of K-pop girlgroup Lovelyz
- Cho-A, singer, former member of K-pop girl group, AOA
- San E, rapper, songwriter
