= Namdong District =

District of Incheon, South Korea

Coordinates: 37°26′36″N 126°43′55″E

Namdong
- Autonomous District
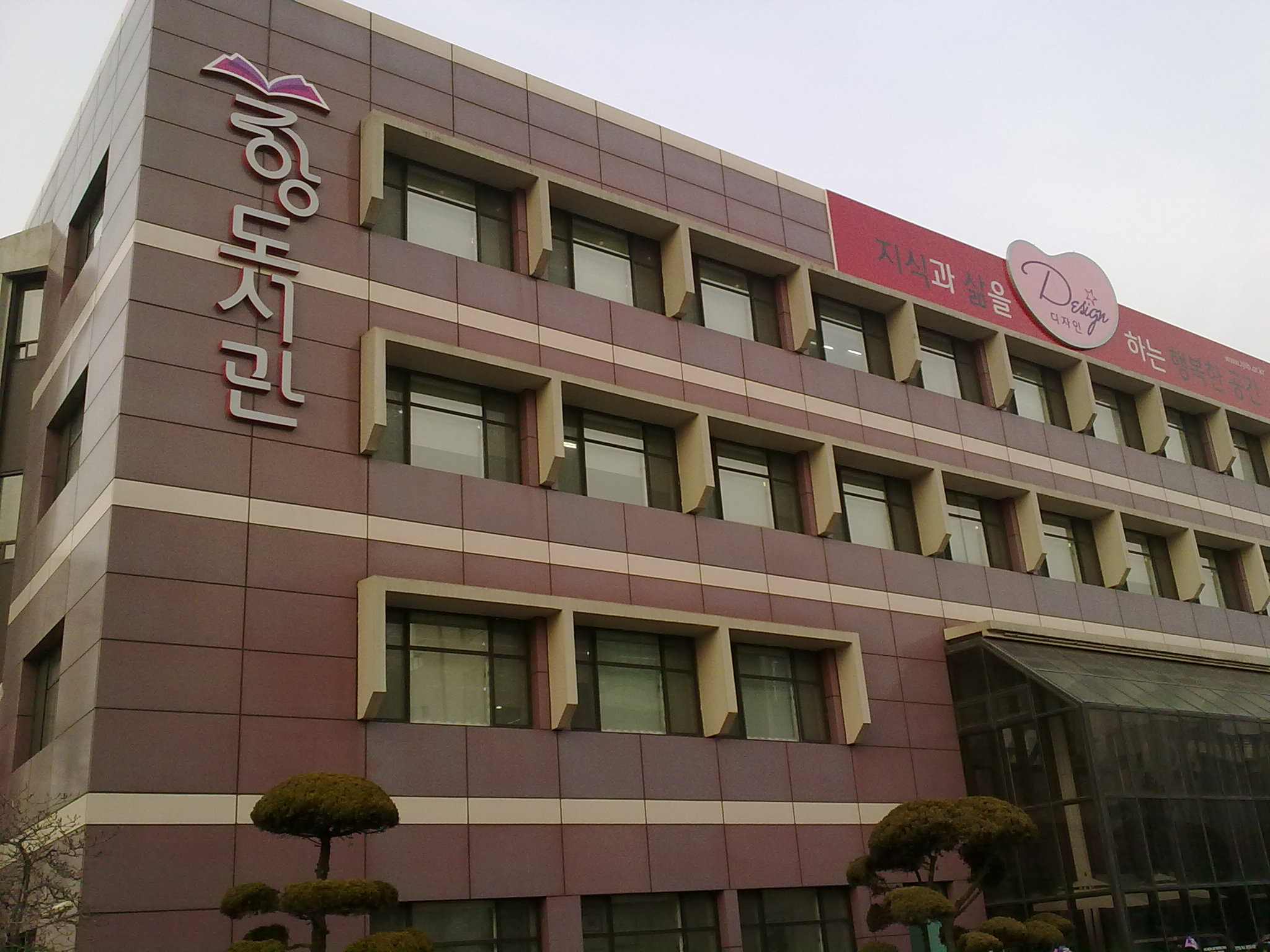
- Incheon Metropolitan City Central Library

- Flag

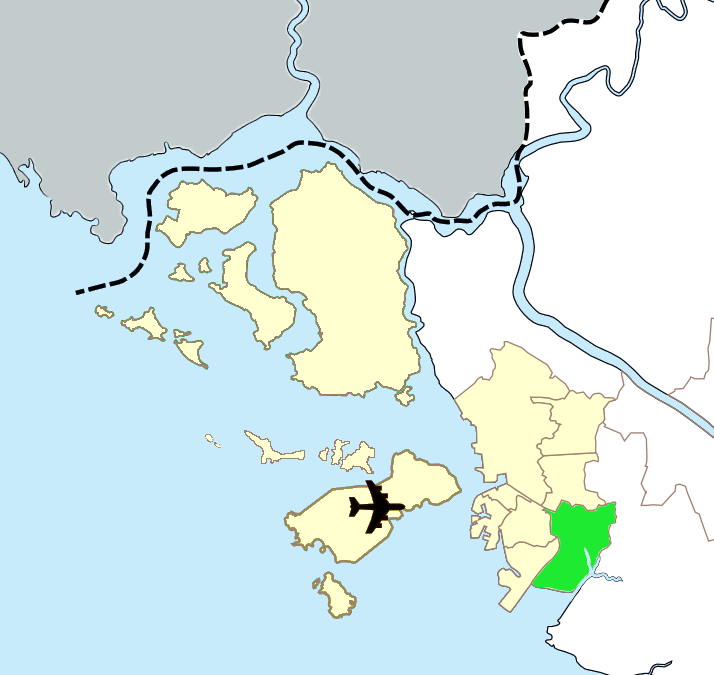
- Country: South Korea
- Region: Sudogwon
- Provincial level: Incheon
- Administrative divisions: 19 administrative dong

Area
  - Total: 57.01 km^{2} (22.01 sq mi)

Population (September 2024)
  - Total: 487,569
  - Density: 8,552/km^{2} (22,150/sq mi)
  - Dialect: Seoul
- Website: Namdong District Office

Korean name
- Hangul: 남동구
- Hanja: 南洞區
- RR: Namdong-gu
- MR: Namdong-gu

Namdong District (Korean: 남동구) is a municipal district of Incheon, South Korea. Namdong District has been the city centre of Incheon since 1985. It is the location for Incheon Metropolitan City Hall, Incheon Metropolitan Police Agency main offices, the Namdong Industrial Complex, and Gil Hospital & Gachon Medical School. There is a large shopping district close to the City Hall and Grand Theater containing 3 large department stores, many restaurants and bars and the 2.68 km (1.67 mi) long Jung-Ang city park.

== Notable locations ==
- Incheon Grand Park
- Incheon City Hall
- Incheon Central Library
- The 2.68 km long Jung-Ang city park.
- The Lotte department stores and nearby shopping district.
- The Incheon Arts Center Grand Theater and surrounding district.
- Incheon City Hall, Arts Center and Incheon Bus Terminal Subway stations.
- Incheon Bus Terminal
- Gil Hospital
- Namdong Tower

== Administrative subdivisions ==
Administrative divisions

- Guwol 1 to 4 Dong
- Ganseok 1 to 4 Dong
- Mansu 1 to 6 Dong
- Nonhyeon-dong
- Jangsu-Seochang Dong
- Nonhyeon-Gojan Dong
- Namchon-Dorim Dong

== Notable people ==
- Lee Han-gyul
