= Gyeonggi International Trade High School =

Location
- 141, Seokcheon-ro, Bucheon, G Gyeonggi-do; South Korea
- Coordinates: 37.5005°N 126.7615°E

Information
- Type: Public
- Motto: Sincerity, Creation (성실, 창조)
- Established: 1 November 1994
- Faculty: 36
- Enrollment: 911
- Website: http://www.gitra.hs.kr/

Gyeonggi International Trade High School (경기국제통상고등학교) is a public high school in Bucheon, Gyeonggi-do, South Korea.
