= Samsan Gymnasium station =

Metro station in Incheon, South Korea

삼산체육관 (한국만화박물관·웹툰융합센터); Samsan Gymnasium (Korea Manhwa Museum·Webtoon Convergence Center)
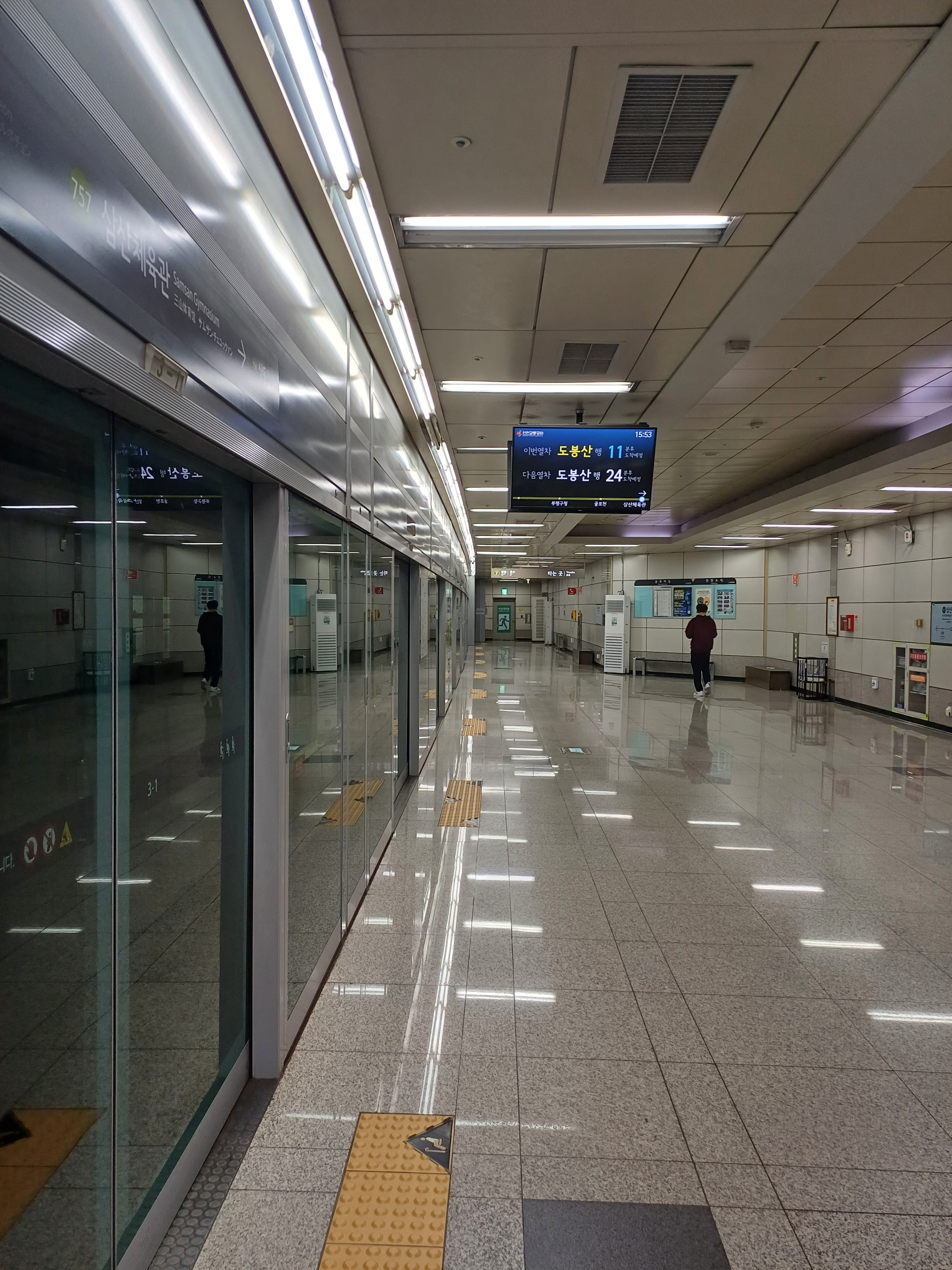

Korean name
- Hangul: 삼산체육관역
- Hanja: 三山體育館驛
- Revised Romanization: Samsancheyukgwannyeok
- McCune–Reischauer: Samsanch'eyukkwannyŏk

General information
- Location: 466 Samsan-dong, Bupyeong-gu, Incheon
- Coordinates: 37°30′23″N 126°44′31″E
- Operator: Incheon Transit Corporation
- Line: Line 7
- Platforms: 2
- Tracks: 2

Construction
- Structure type: Underground

Key dates
- October 27, 2012: Line 7 opened
Location

Samsan Gymnasium Station is a railway station on Seoul Subway Line 7.

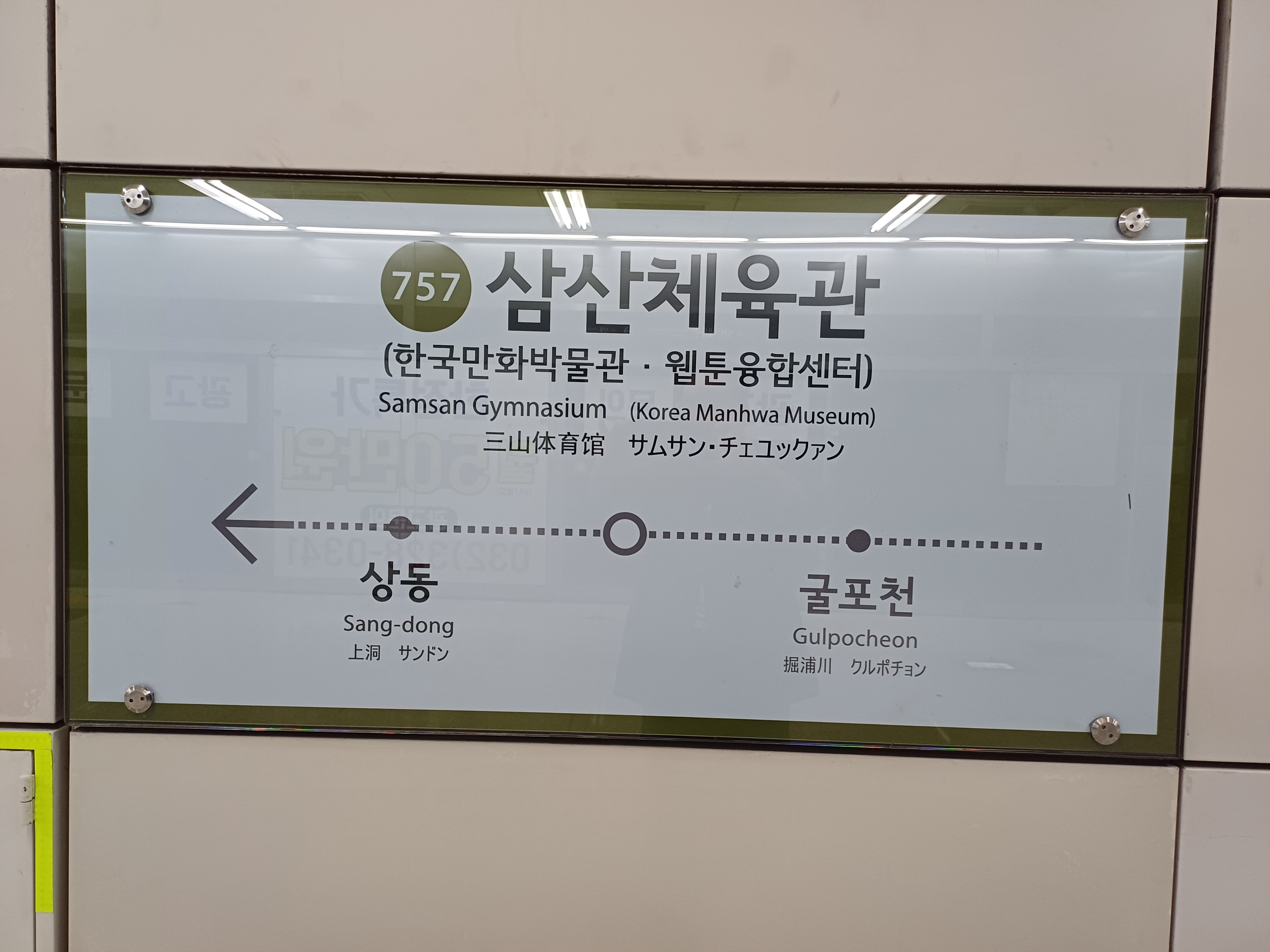

== Station layout ==
Sang-dong ↑
S/B | | N/B
↓ Gulpocheon

Southbound	← ● Line 7 toward Seongnam
Northbound	● Line 7 toward Jangam →

== Vicinity ==
- Exit 1: Sinmyeong Skyview Apt.
- Exit 2: Bugae Park
- Exit 3: Samsan World Gymnasium
- Exit 4: Samsan World Gymnasium
- Exit 5: Aiinsworld, Bucheon

Preceding station	Seoul Metropolitan Subway	Following station
Sang-dong towards Jangam	Line 7	Gulpocheon towards Seongnam
