= 상동역 =

상동역 may refer to stations:

- Sang-dong station (上洞驛), railway station on the Seoul Subway Line 7
- Sangdong station (上東驛), railway station on the Gyeongbu Line
