= Sakiroo =

South Korean illustrator

- 최상현 (崔相賢)
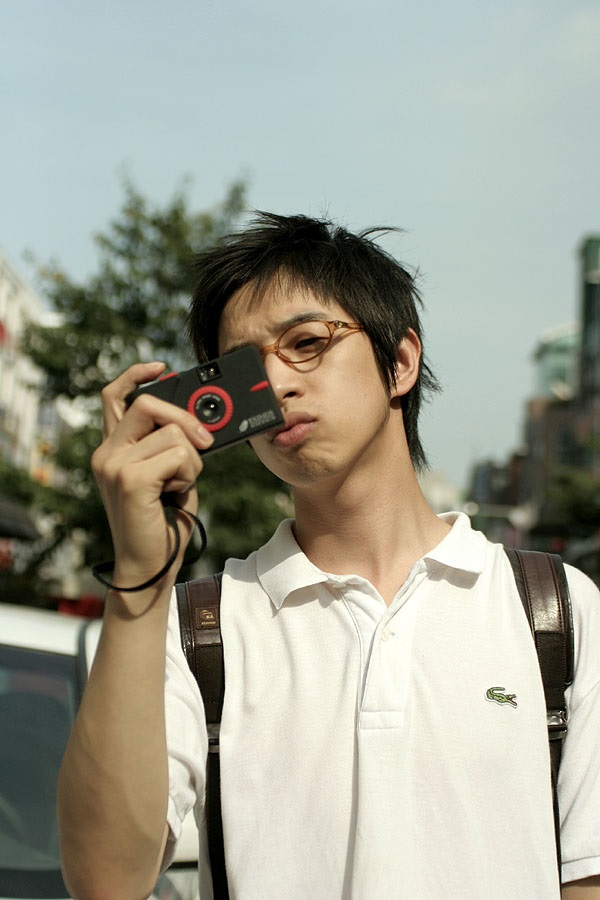
- 2008 taking photos
- Born: Sang-Hyun Choi; July 29, 1980 (age 46); Bucheon, South Korea
- Known for: Illustrator; character; designer
- Website: sakiroo.com

Sakiroo (Korean: 사키루), born Choi Sang-hyun (Korean: 최상현; Hanja: 崔相賢), is a South Korean illustrator and character designer. The subjects for his work are varied and include caricatures of sports figures. He has been involved in exhibits and projects (see below), including those in South Korea, France, England, United Arab Emirates, China, Singapore, United States, Mexico, Colombia, and Venezuela. He lives and works in Bucheon, just outside Seoul.

== Biography ==
Sakiroo received no formal education as an artist. He said that due to not having a lot of childhood toys, he drew faces of his favorite characters on paper and fashioned them into an origami type of story to play with. He began earning money for his drawings when he was twenty. His first jobs were "special dot mini character" designs for the internet communities for Neowiz "SayClub" and "Avatar" in 2000, and for SK Communications and Cyworld "Mini-rooms" during 2003-2007. In 2005, he posed as an "artist" model for clothing brand MLB Korea, and along with his artwork, in an ad for KT&G.

For a book cover project in Singapore, artists were asked to choose a book that had been influential to them. He chose Stephen R. Covey's "Principle-Centered Leadership," which he said played an important part in determining his life’s path. "Despite having no formal training in art, he left a nine-year career in the corporate sector to realise his dream of becoming an artist."

"Sakiroo" is a nickname that he made up from syllables and sounds that he likes "Sa" "ki" "roo," wanting to distinguish his choice to become an independent artist.

== Style and works ==
His work has been described as "a multitude of illustrations and cartoons full of color and extravagance," "inspired by cartoons and manga," influenced by "Asian themes," and combining "hand-drawn illustrations with digital coloring — using his own color theory." In an interview with KOCCA he said he mainly works on paper, which allows him to sketch in coffee shops in Seoul, without computer graphics. Manga that have influenced him include Yusuke Murata's Eyeshield 21, and Akira Toriyama's Dr. Slump and Dragon Ball. Dragon Ball's second anime adaptation, Dragon Ball Z, was also an influence.

His work, though varied, sticks closely to popular culture themes, often making fun of them. In 2011, his "Yellow Lemon" characters, with "oblong heads, menacing grins, beady eyes and dental work from the '90's" populated a "school" with uniformed elite characters, including Batman, Superman, Ronald McDonald, Homer Simpson and Michael Jackson. After he used the characters again to "pick on" famous fashion brands, Hugo Boss, Ermenegildo Zegna, Burberry, Lacoste and The North Face; Trendhunter.com said "Yellow Lemon" was becoming a cultural staple itself.

In 2013, both Mass Appeal and Flavorwire, that document urban and cultural trends, noted his caricature work with Colombian artist Pol (Jean Paul Egred), "some of music’s best collabs", among those, MJ and Eddie Van Halen, Run–D.M.C. and Aerosmith, enhanced with beaks, braces and severed limbs. He had previously joined Pol in 2012, with other South Korean and Colombian artists, when they met in Miami to show an interpretation of each other's pop icons.

In 2013, he illustrated The Big Bang Theory for Warner Bros. Television; and the Striding Man for Johnnie Walker, and in 2014, Valderrama for Major League Soccer Insider.

In 2016, he spoke about his soccer illustrations on SBS TV's Football Magazine Goal! and continued educational talks with other young artists. His June 2016 autobiography, Sakiroo Breaking, details his path to becoming an artist. Kim Byung-joon of E-Daily News said, "The depth of the message is deep because it crosses over material such as philosophy, history, culture, art, and education."

== Selected projects and recognition ==
- 2006: Interview and live drawing illustration for a singer’s album, Mnet TV, Seoul, South Korea
- 2011: NOW magazine cover, Maracaibo, Venezuela
- 2011: "8 Players Illustrations" for ESPN The Magazine, United States
- 2012: Wall painting, Korean and Colombian artist's group, Wynwood, Florida
- 2012: Sakiroo X Jean Paul Egred, Duo Musician Illustration, "Rock It", Wynwood, Florida and Bogotá, Colombia
- 2012: Dot objects design for Jellyfish Entertainment VIXX 2nd M/V & Album, Seoul, South Korea
- 2013: Design competition judge, "Cut & Paste: Characterized Seoul 2013", Seoul, South Korea
- 2013: Speaker, Design class, The College of Architecture, Art, and Design at Mississippi State University. Mississippi State University, Starkville, Mississippi
- 2013: Speaker 2013 Illustrators Deathmatch, Querétaro Mexico
- 2013: Concept illustration for VIP lounge large mural, Diageo's Seoul Johnnie Walker House, England
- 2014: "Carlos "El Pibe" Valderrama" Futbol Artist Network, featured Major League Soccer "MLS Insider series", United States
- 2014: "Referee", Grand Prix winner (Al Sabeh Cement), "I Fell From a Unicorn", Bronze winner (Band-aid), for Impact BBDO Dubai, Dubai Lynx International Advertising Festival, Dubai, United Arab Emirates
- 2014: Speaker, Create Now 2014 - 대한민국, Adobe Creative Cloud, Seoul, South Korea
- 2015: Banner illustration, tutorial, Adobe Dreamweaver CC, United States
- 2015: Playing Art Edition Two, "Seven of Diamonds", Digital Abstracts Magazine, Spain
- 2015: Speaker, TedxYouth, Korean Minjok Leadership Academy, Hoengseong-gun, South Korea
- 2016: Speaker, AAD International Design Exchange Seminar and Vision Get Wild 2015, Kaohsiung Exhibition Center, Kaohsiung, Taiwan

== Solo exhibitions ==
- 2015: "Sakiroo's Illustration Fantasy", Sejong Center's Dream Forest Art Center Dream Gallery, Gangbuk-gu, South Korea

== Selected group exhibitions ==
- 2012: "Korea Sports Art 2012", Mokspace Gallery, London, England
- 2012: "Red Bull F1 Sports Art 2012", Seoul, South Korea
- 2012: "According To Them, East! Meet West", Spaces Gallery, Wynwood, Florida and Bogota, Colombia
- 2013: "I Love You Man", Bottleneck Art Gallery, Brooklyn, New York
- 2013: "Read Carefully", Kult Gallery, Singapore
- 2013: "Human Movement", Surim Cultural Foundation, Galerie 89, Paris, France
- 2013: "The Big Bang Theory Artist Series", Warner Bros. Television booth at San Diego Comic-Con, San Diego, California
- 2013: "The Physics of Friendship: A Tribute to The Big Bang Theory", Gallery Nucleus and Warner Bros. Television, Alhambra California
- 2013: "Ichabod", Lacuna Artist Lofts, Chicago, Illinois
- 2013: "From Seoul to Mississippi", Visual Arts Center Gallery, Department of Art at Mississippi State University, Starkville, Mississippi
- 2014: "Books That Moved Me", National Library Board Read Fest 2014, Kult Gallery, Singapore

== Publications ==
=== His Own ===
- Sang-hyun Choi, editor So-young Park, Pixel Art Design (with Photoshop) (2003), ISBN 9788931424430
- Sang-hyun Choi, Sakiroo's Character & Dots (2005), ISBN 9788959520107
- Sang-hyun Choi, Sakiroo Breaking (2016), ISBN 9788992454261

=== Included In ===
- Yang Liu, Fantastic Illustration (2011), ISBN 9789881607553
- Dopress Books, Always Me!: Self-Portraits of Global Illustrators (Inspire Series) (2013), ISBN 9781908175168
- Kenny Scharf (Introduction), Andrew Kaufman (Photographer), AK Foto (Photographer), I'm in Miami Bitch! (2013), ISBN 9780989512305
- Sendpoints Publishing, Beyond Illustration: Designs & Applications (2014), ISBN 9789881683403
- Hightone, Magic Paintbrush by Illustration (2015), ISBN 9789867022929
- Chen Yu Mingh, AAD outstanding illustration artists in Asia (2016), ISBN 9789574334728
