= Chunui station =

Metro station in Bucheon, South Korea

춘의 (예손병원); Chunui (Yeson Hospital)
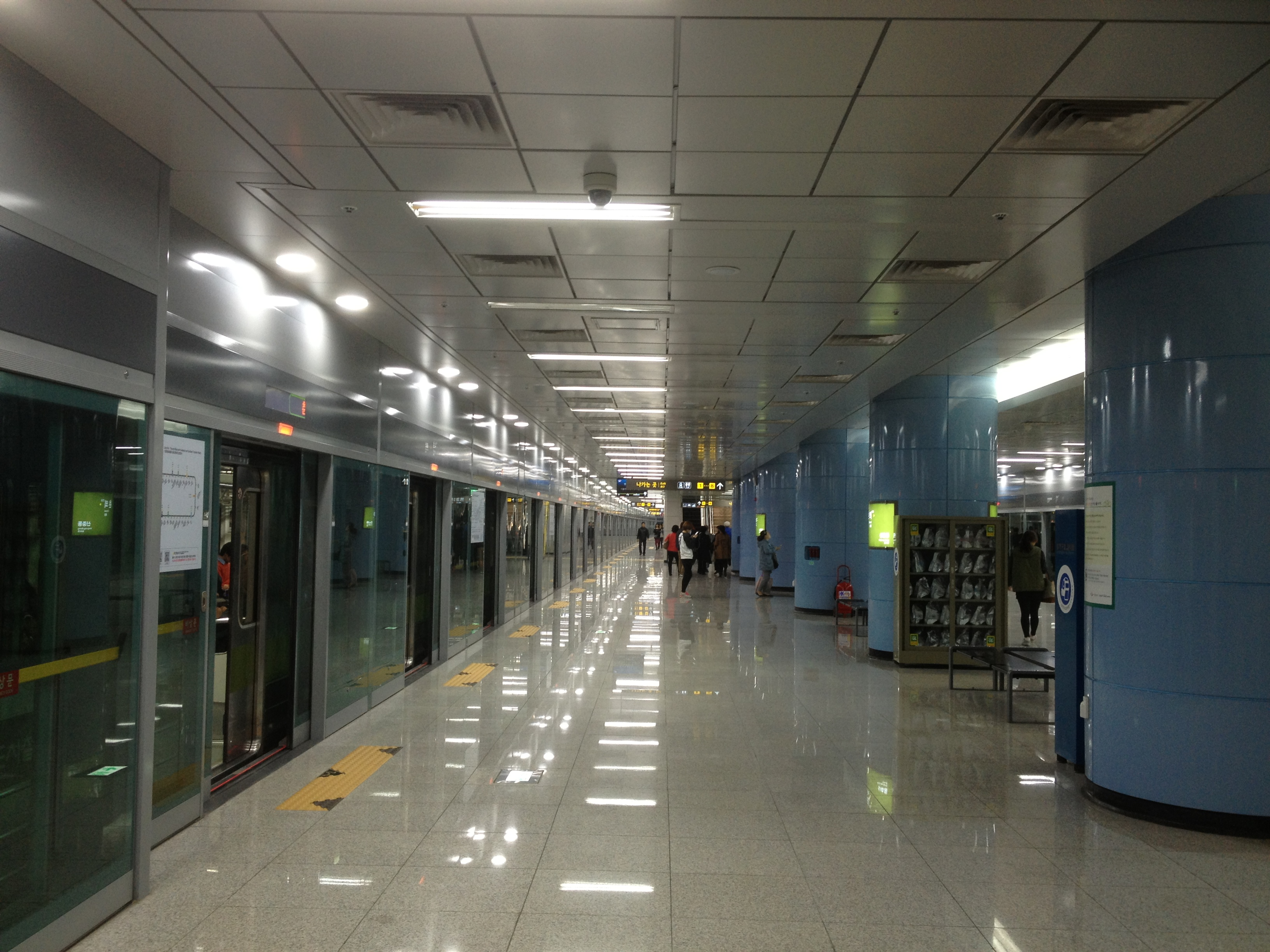

Korean name
- Hangul: 춘의역
- Hanja: 春衣驛
- Revised Romanization: Chunui-yeok
- McCune–Reischauer: Ch'unŭi-yŏk

General information
- Location: Chunui-dong, Wonmi-gu, Bucheon, Gyeonggi
- Coordinates: 37.50365°N 126.78707°E
- Operator: Incheon Transit Corporation
- Line: Line 7
- Platforms: 1
- Tracks: 2

Construction
- Structure type: Underground

Key dates
- October 27, 2012: Line 7 opened
Location

Chunui station (Korean: 춘의역) is a station on Seoul Subway Line 7.

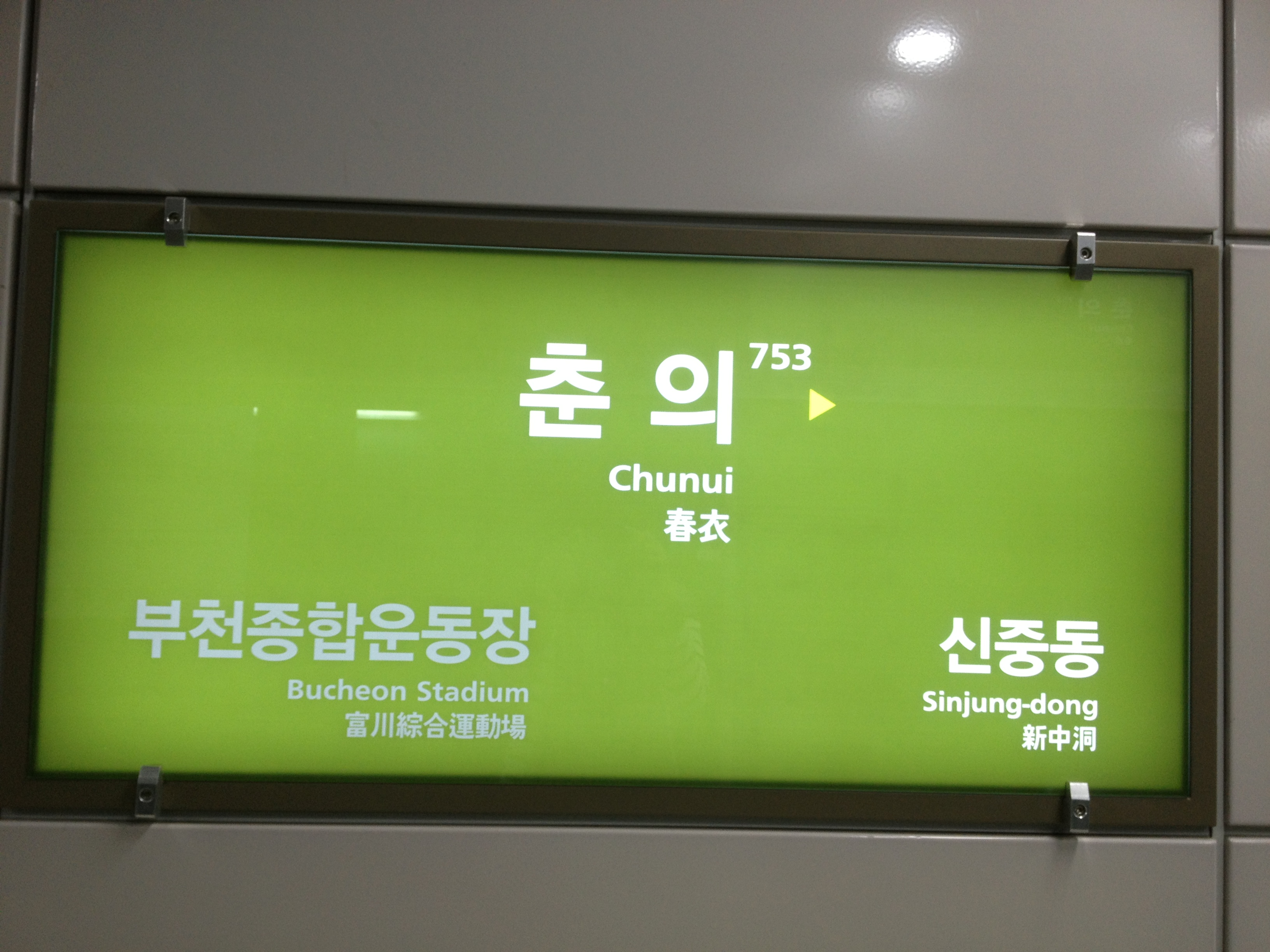

== Station layout ==
Bucheon Stadium ↑
| S/B N/B |
↓ Sinjung-dong

Southbound	← ● Line 7 toward Seongnam
Northbound	● Line 7 toward Jangam →

Preceding station	Seoul Metropolitan Subway	Following station
Bucheon Stadium towards Jangam	Line 7	Sinjung-dong towards Seongnam
