= Bucheon City Hall station =

Metro station in Bucheon, South Korea

부천시청 (부천아트센터·삼성탑내과의원); Bucheon City Hall (Bucheon Arts Center·Samseong Top Internal Medicine Clinic)
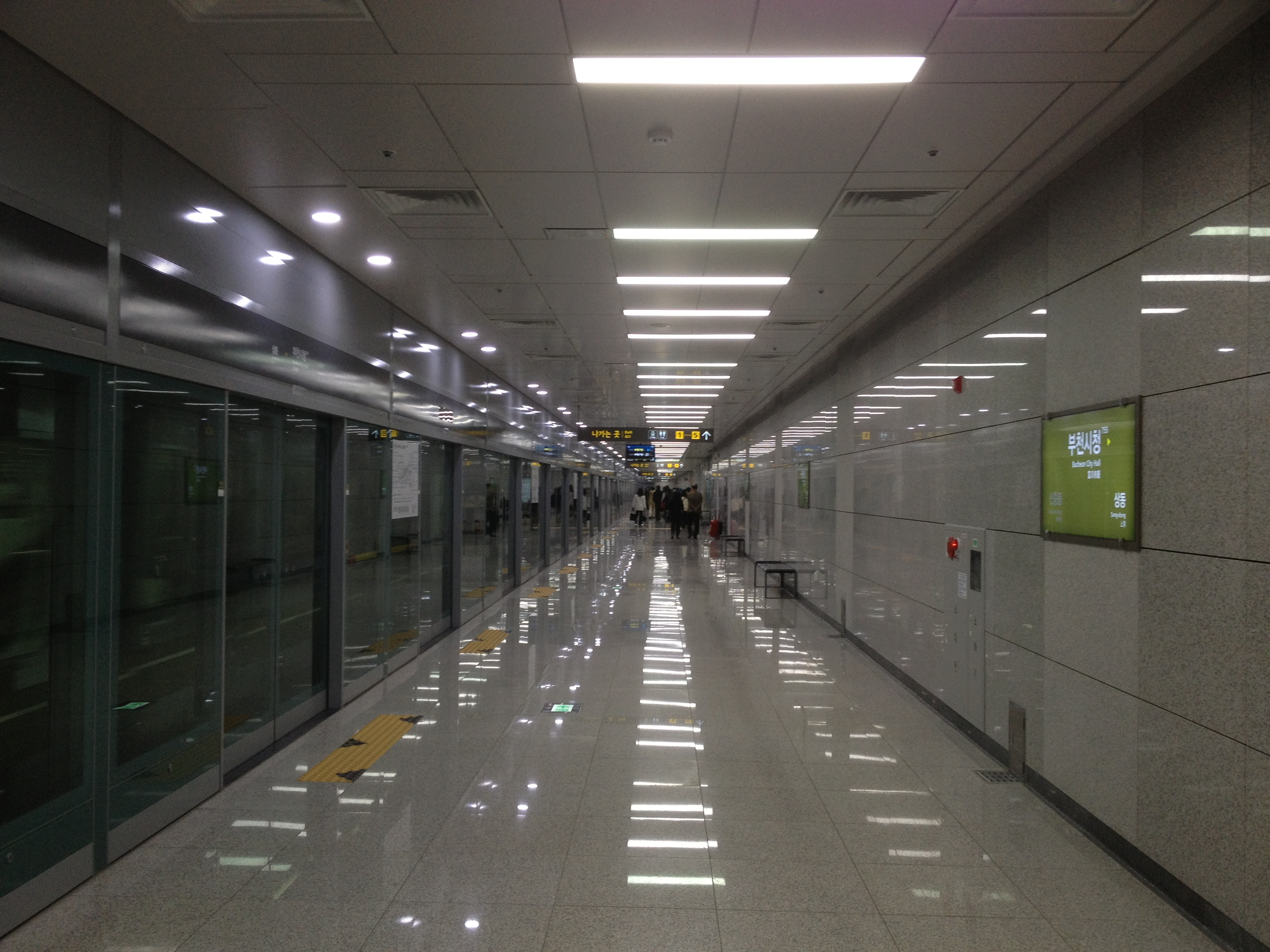

Korean name
- Hangul: 부천시청역
- Hanja: 富川市廳驛
- Revised Romanization: Bucheonsicheong-yeok
- McCune–Reischauer: Puch'ŏnsich'ŏng-yŏk

General information
- Location: Jung-dong, Bucheon, Gyeonggi-do
- Coordinates: 37°30′17″N 126°45′49″E
- Operator: Incheon Transit Corporation
- Line: Line 7
- Platforms: 1
- Tracks: 2

Construction
- Structure type: Underground

Key dates
- October 27, 2012: Line 7 opened
Location

Bucheon City Hall Station is a railway station on Seoul Subway Line 7.

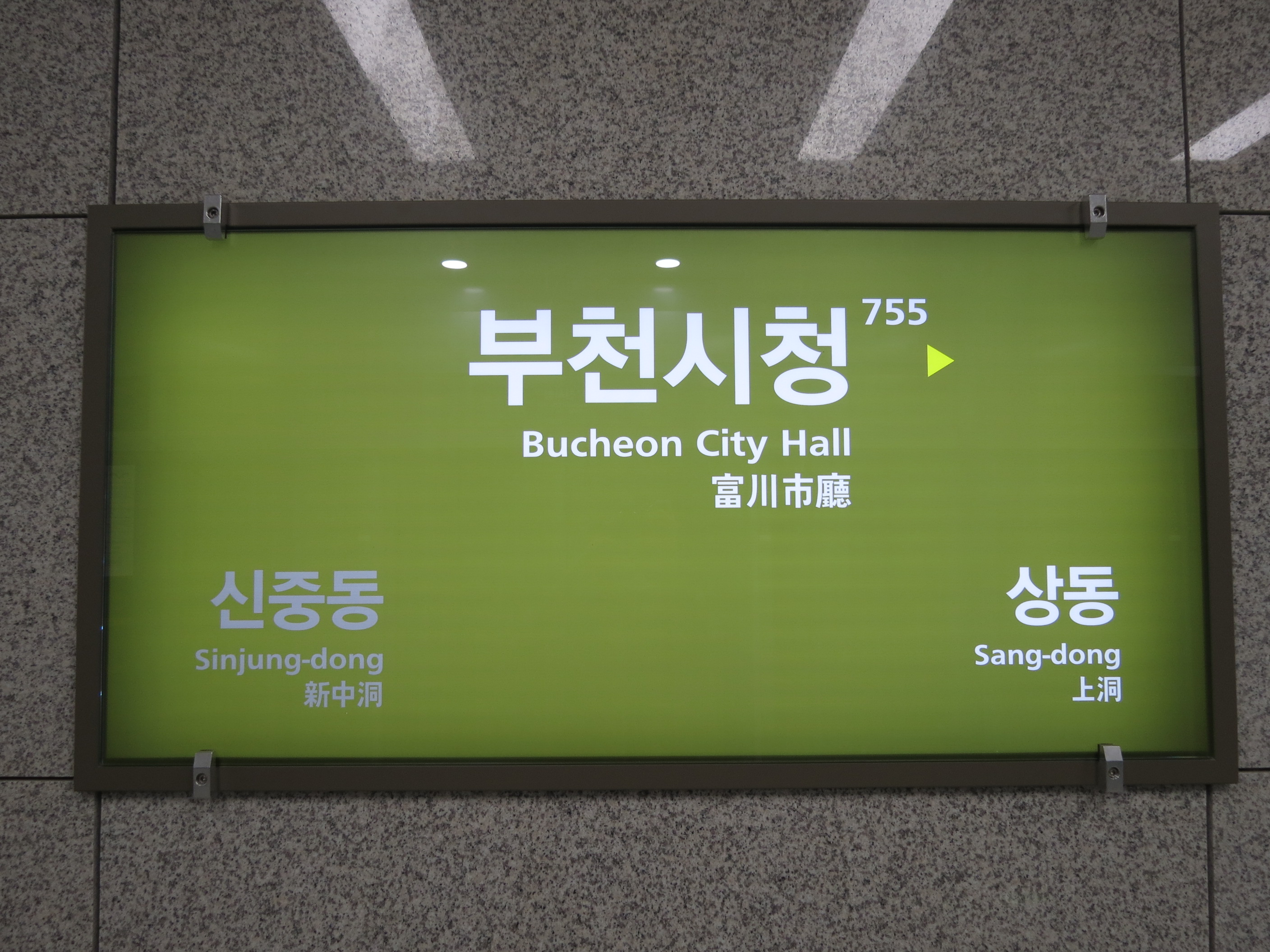

== Station layout ==
Sinjung-dong ↑
| S/B N/B |
↓ Sang-dong

Southbound	← ● Line 7 toward Seongnam
Northbound	● Line 7 toward Jangam →

Preceding station	Seoul Metropolitan Subway	Following station
Sinjung-dong towards Jangam	Line 7	Sang-dong towards Seongnam
