= Kkachiul station =

Metro station in Bucheon, South Korea

Coordinates: 37.506237°N 126.81095°E

까치울; Kkachiul
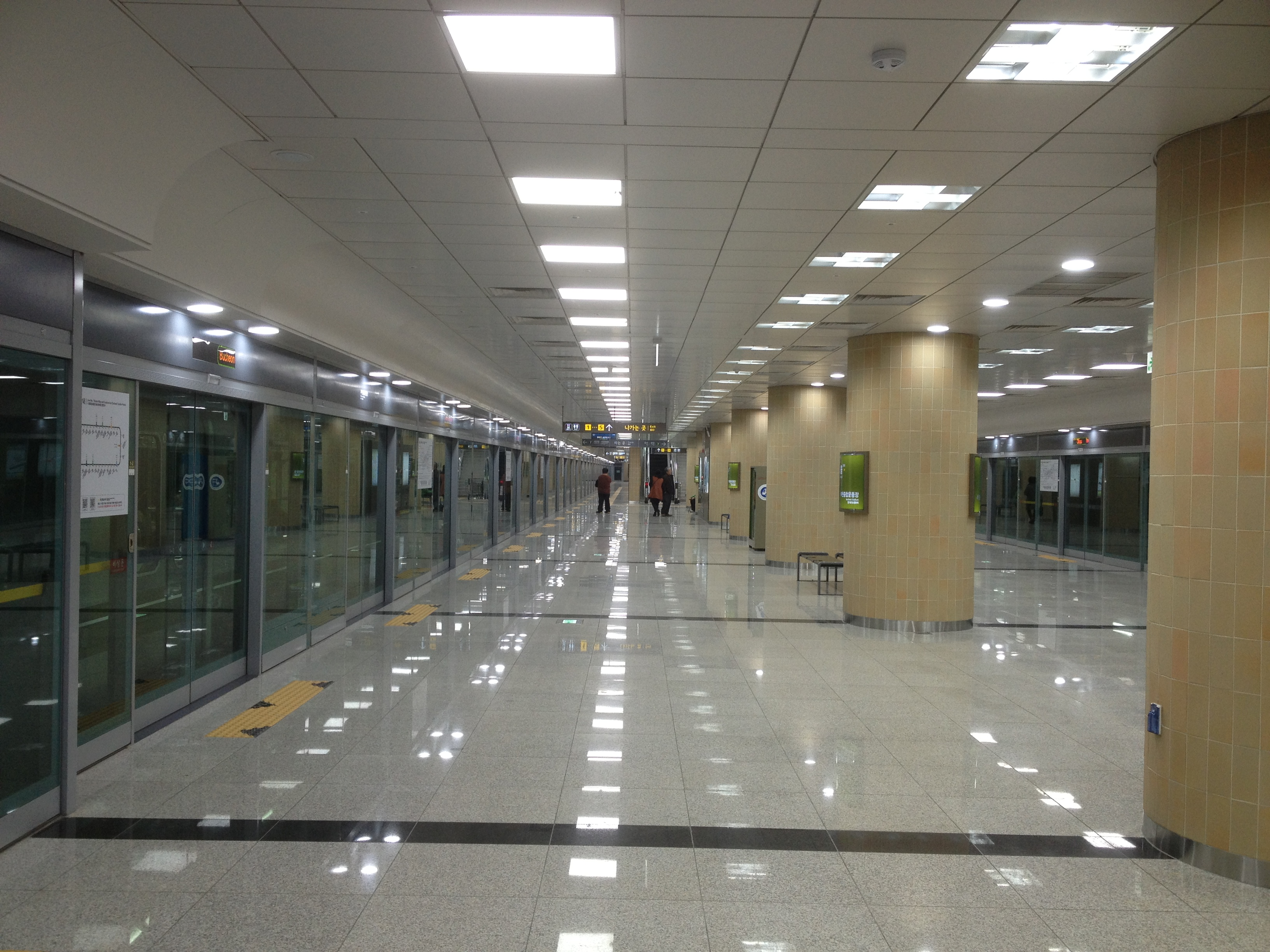

Korean name
- Hangul: 까치울역
- Hanja: 까치울驛
- Revised Romanization: Kkachi-ul-yeok
- McCune–Reischauer: Kkach'iul-yŏk

General information
- Location: Bucheon
- Operator: Incheon Transit Corporation
- Line: Line 7
- Platforms: 1
- Tracks: 2

Construction
- Structure type: Underground

Key dates
- October 27, 2012: Line 7 opened
Location

Kkachiul Station is a subway station on Seoul Subway Line 7.

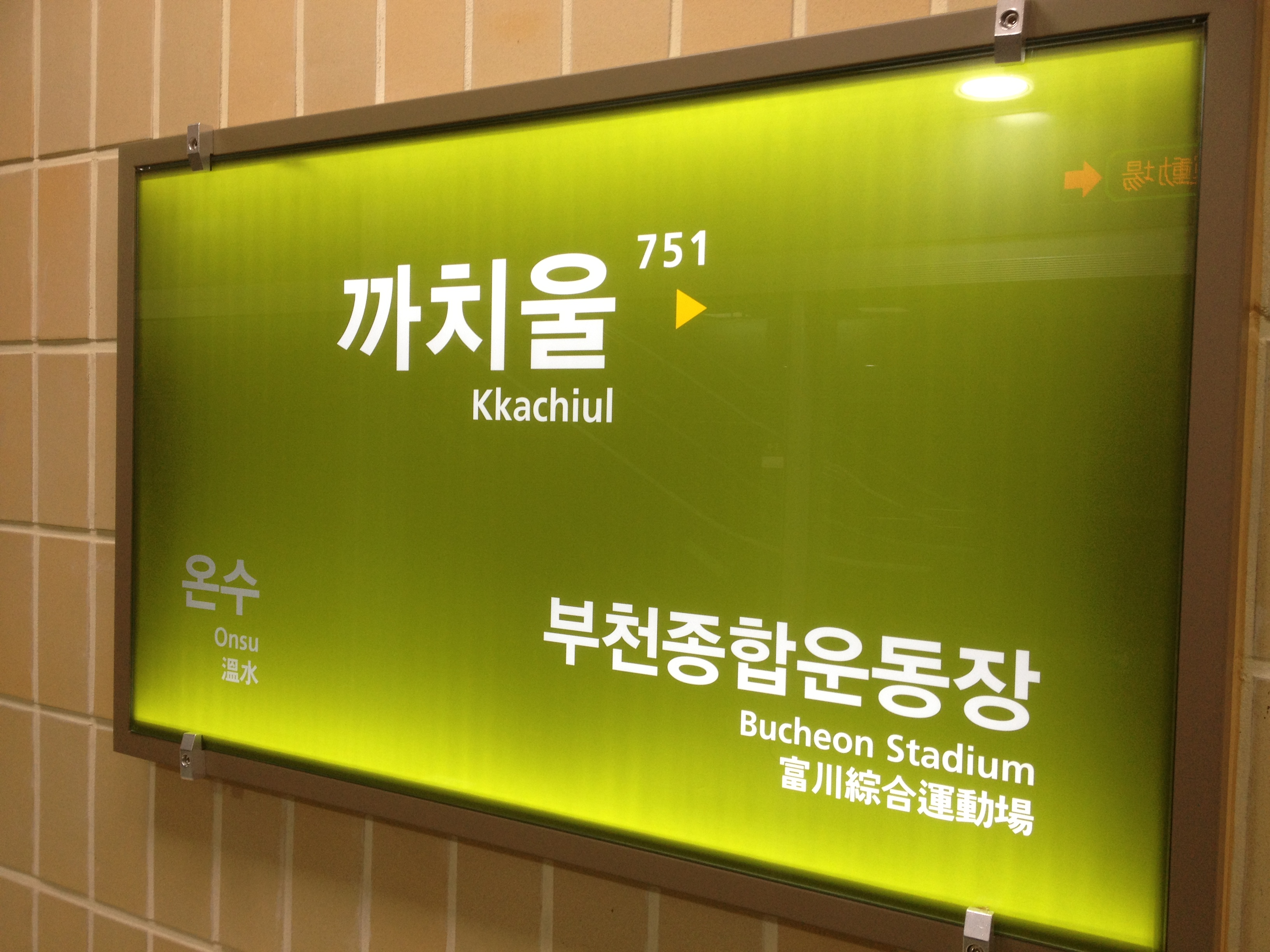

== Station layout ==
Onsu ↑
| S/B N/B |
↓ Bucheon Stadium

Southbound	← ● Line 7 toward Seongnam
Northbound	● Line 7 toward Jangam →

Preceding station	Seoul Metropolitan Subway	Following station
Onsu towards Jangam	Line 7	Bucheon Stadium towards Seongnam
