= Sinjung-dong station =

Metro station in Bucheon, South Korea

Coordinates: 37.50308°N 126.77616°E

신중동; Sinjung-dong
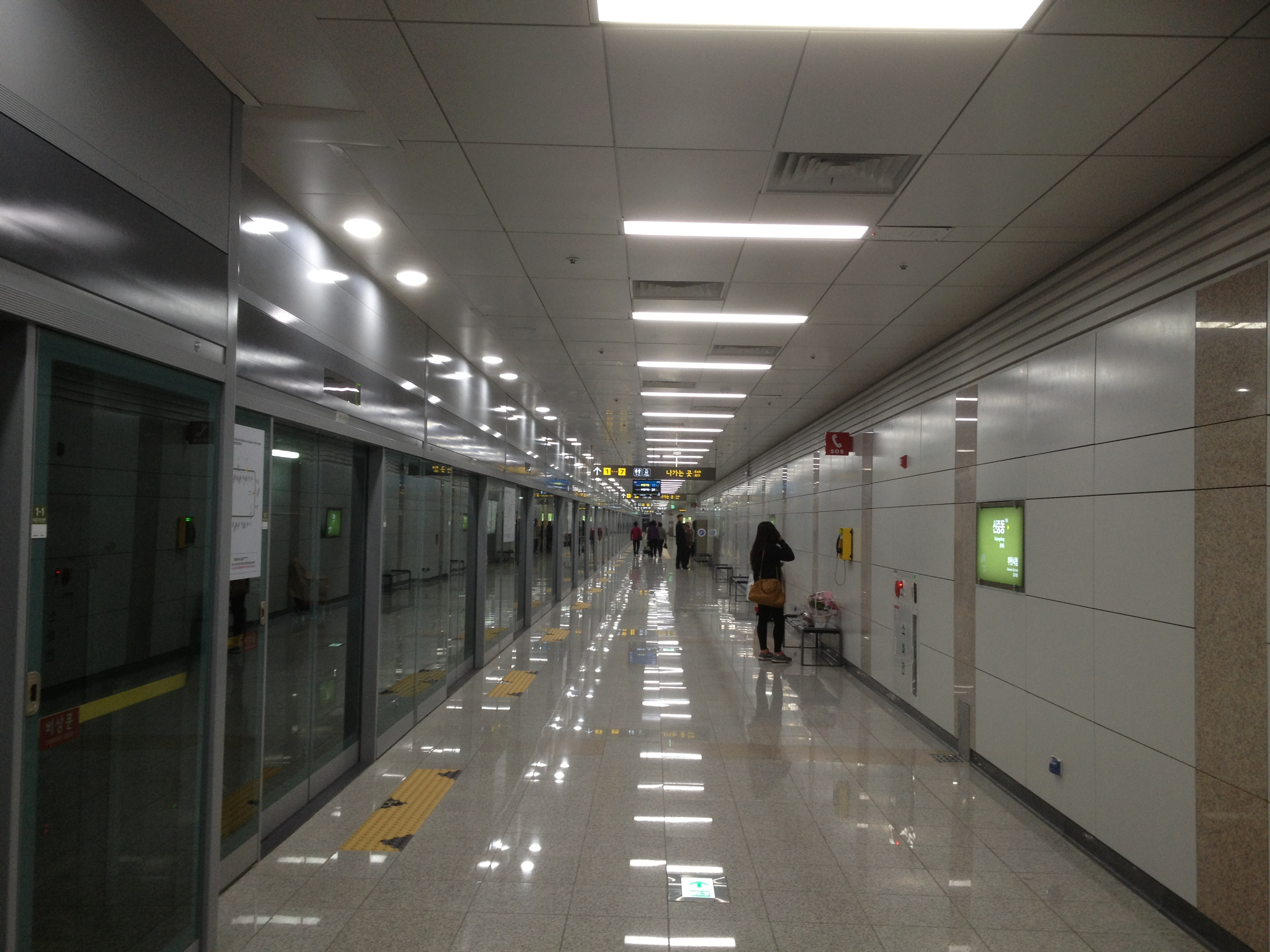

Korean name
- Hangul: 신중동역
- Hanja: 新中洞驛
- Revised Romanization: Sinjungdong-yeok
- McCune–Reischauer: Sinjungdong-yŏk

General information
- Location: Bucheon
- Operator: Incheon Transit Corporation
- Line: Line 7
- Platforms: 1
- Tracks: 2

Construction
- Structure type: Underground

Key dates
- October 27, 2012: Line 7 opened
Location

Sinjung-dong Station is a railway station on Seoul Subway Line 7.

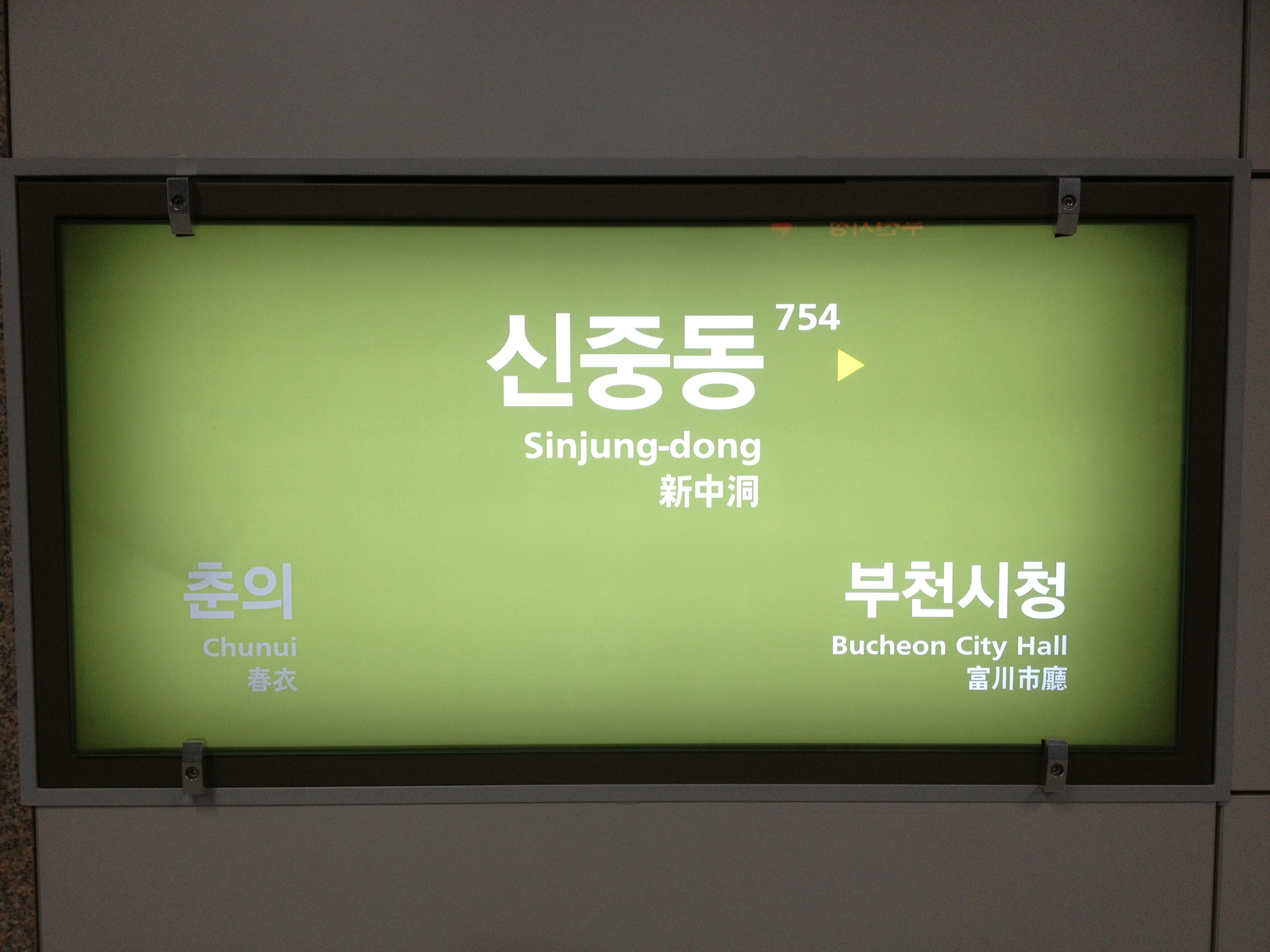

== Station layout ==
Chunui ↑
| S/B N/B |
↓ Bucheon City Hall

Southbound	← ● Line 7 toward Seongnam
Northbound	● Line 7 toward Jangam →

== Vicinity ==
- Exit 1 :
- Exit 2 :
- Exit 3 : Lotte Department Store
- Exit 4 :
- Exit 5 :
- Exit 6 :
- Exit 7 :

Preceding station	Seoul Metropolitan Subway	Following station
Chunui towards Jangam	Line 7	Bucheon City Hall towards Seongnam
