= Bucheon Stadium station =

Metro station in Bucheon, South Korea

Coordinates: 37.50538°N 126.79735°E

부천종합운동장 (부천우리병원); Bucheon Stadium (Bucheon Woori Hospital)
부천종합운동장; Bucheon Stadium
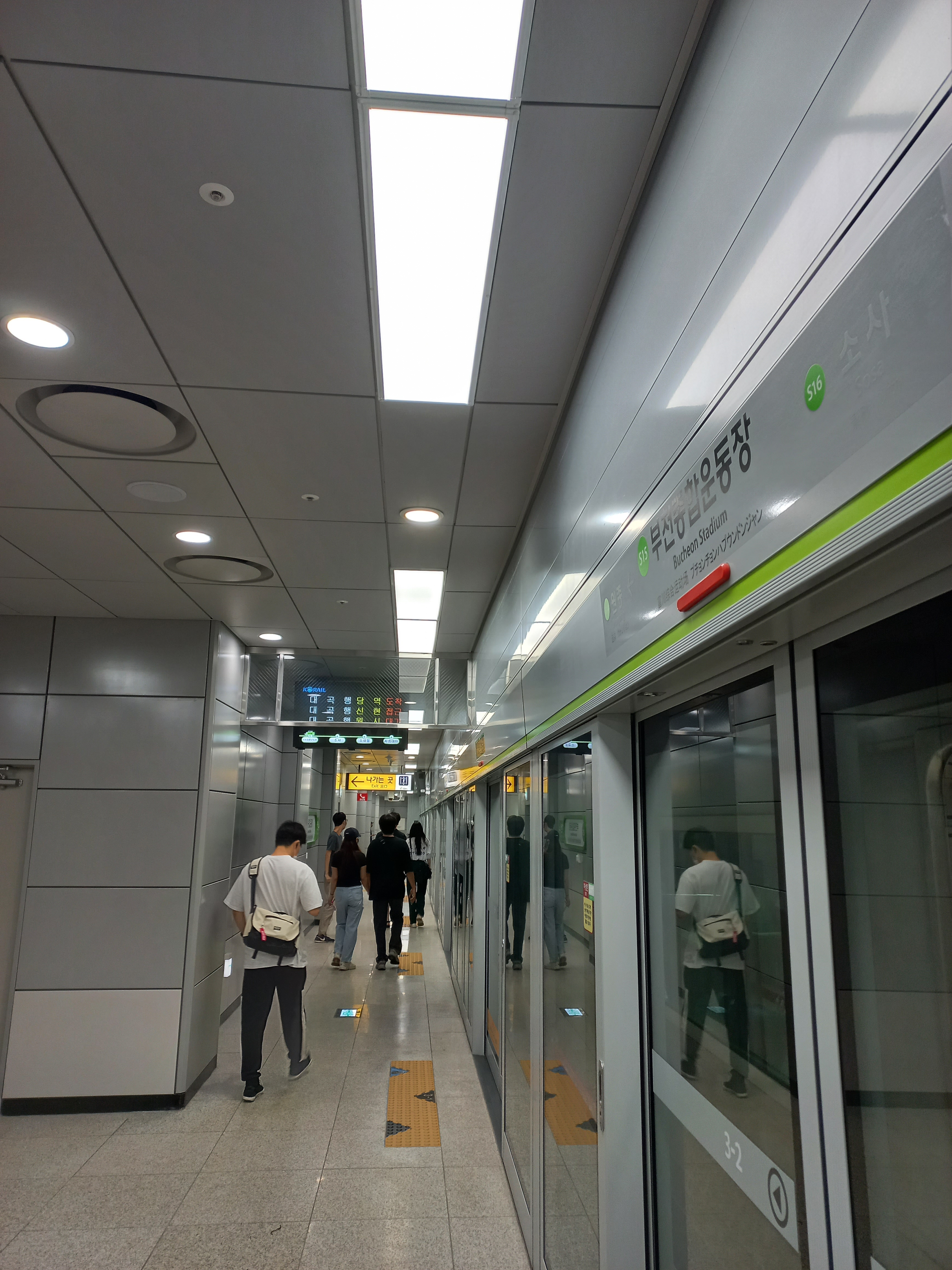
- Seohae Line platform

Korean name
- Hangul: 부천종합운동장역
- Hanja: 富川綜合運動場驛
- Revised Romanization: Bucheon jonghap undongjang-yeok
- McCune–Reischauer: Puch'ŏn chonghap undongjang-yŏk

General information
- Location: Bucheon, Gyeonggi Province
- Operator: Incheon Transit Corporation; Korail
- Lines: Line 7 Seohae Line
- Platforms: 3
- Tracks: 4

Construction
- Structure type: Underground

Key dates
- October 27, 2012: Line 7 opened
- July 1, 2023: Seohae Line opened
Location

Bucheon Stadium Station (Korean: 부천종합운동장역) is a subway station on Seoul Subway Line 7 and the Seohae Line. It became a transfer station to the Seohae Line on July 1, 2023. The station serves Bucheon Stadium.

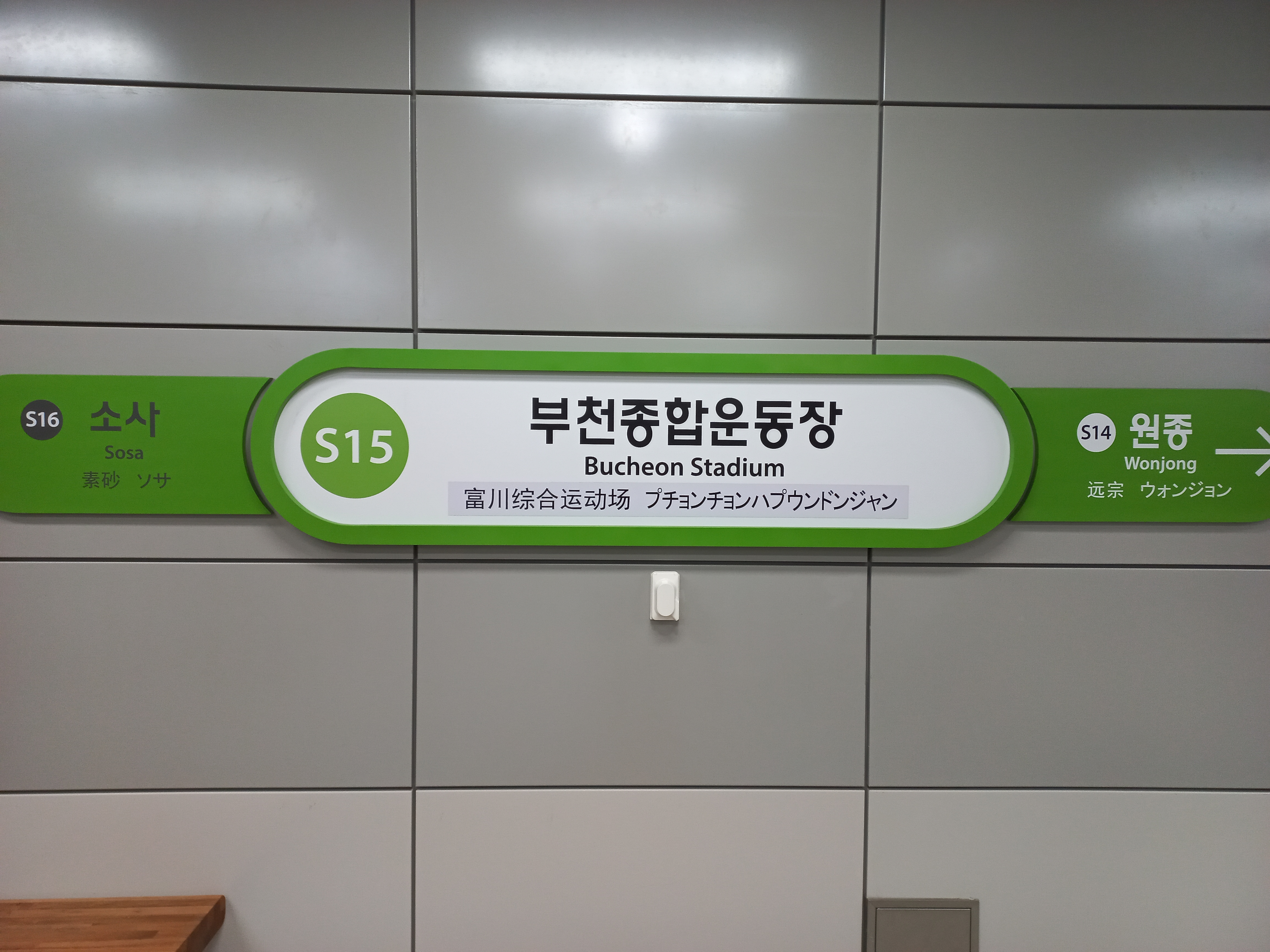
Seohae Line station nameplate

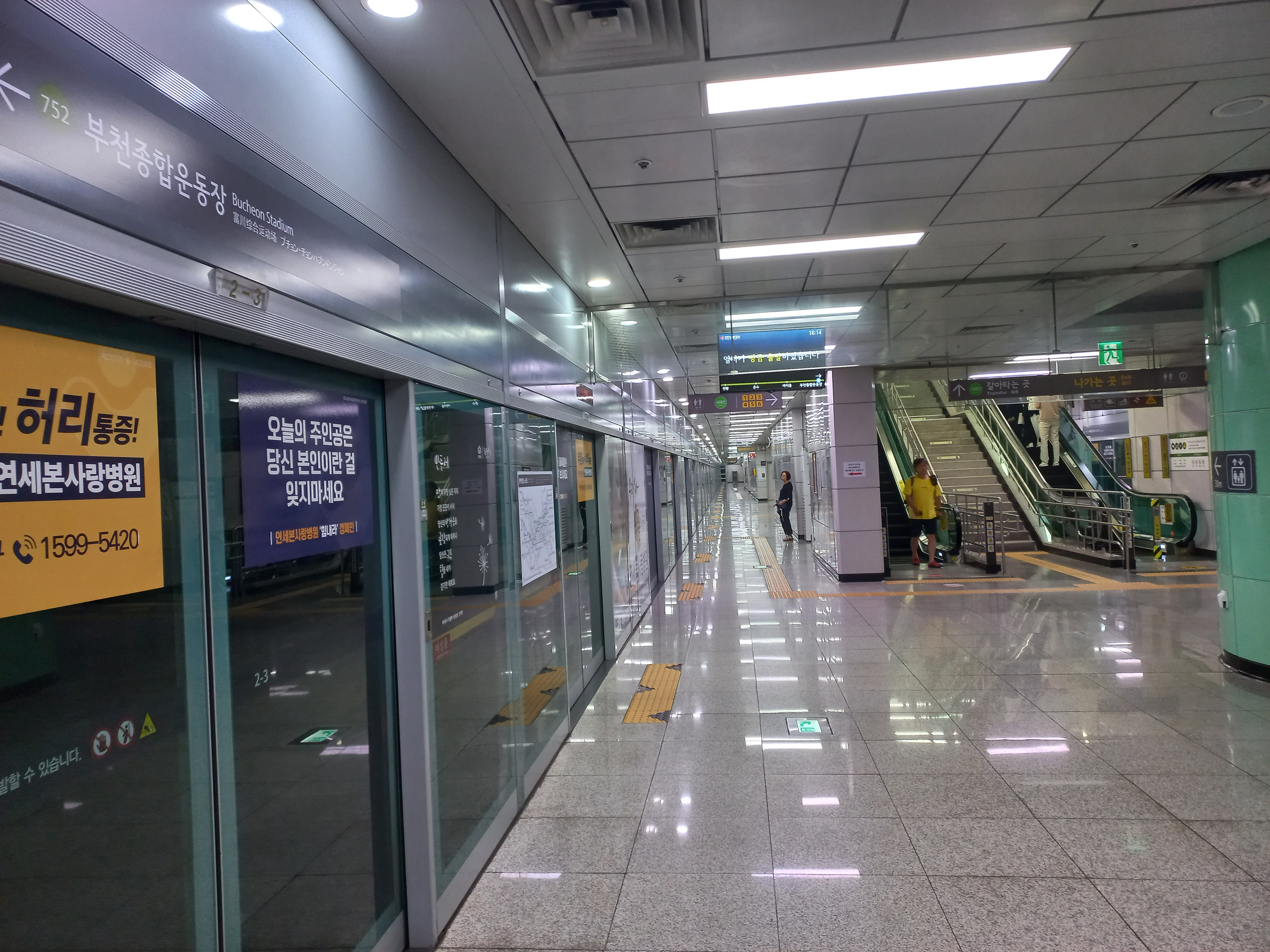
Line 7 platform

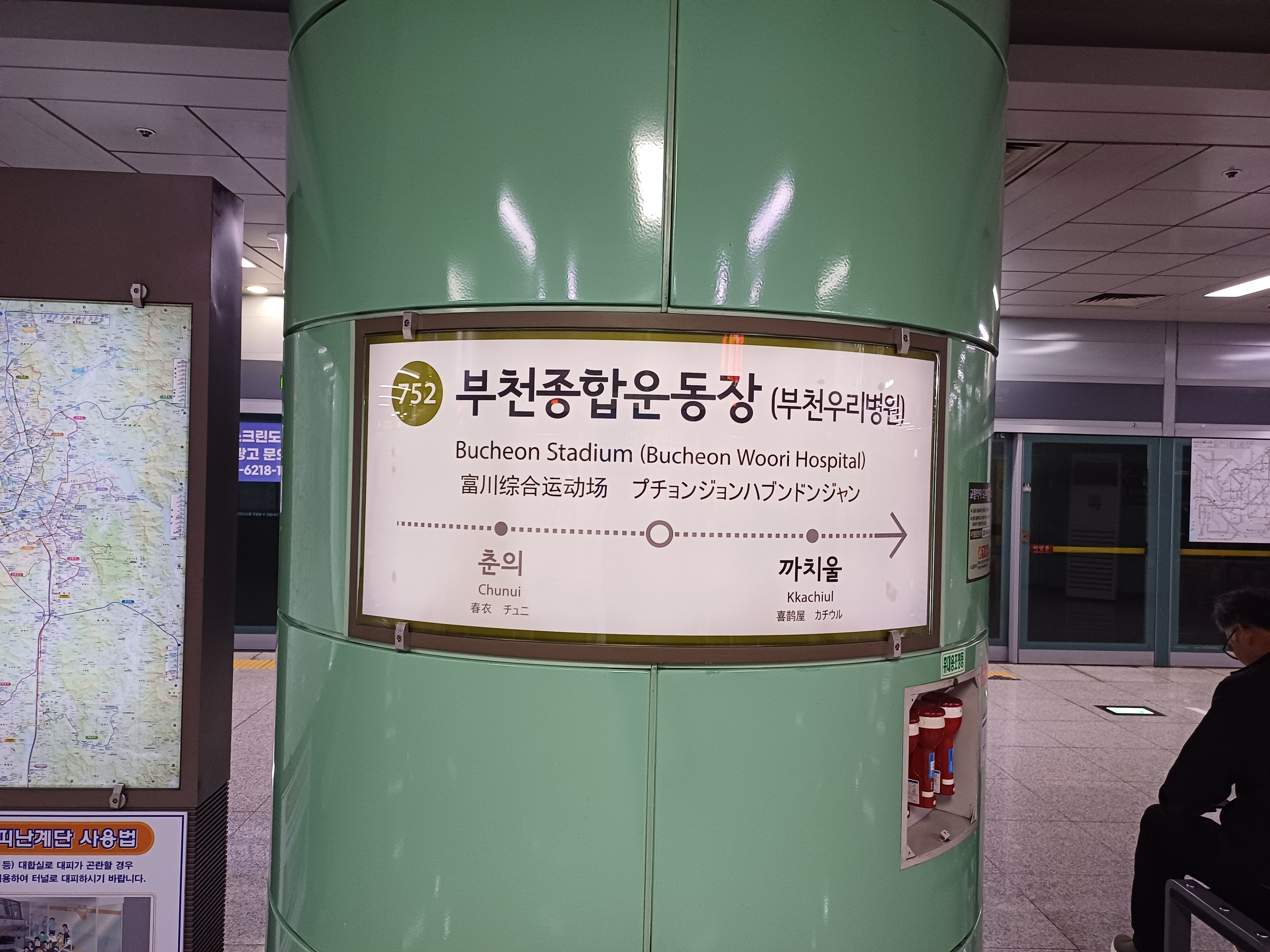
Line 7 station nameplate

== Station layout ==
Kkachiul ↑
| S/B N/B |
↓ Chunui

Southbound	← ● Line 7 toward Seongnam
Northbound	● Line 7 toward Jangam →

Preceding station	Seoul Metropolitan Subway	Following station
Kkachiul towards Jangam	Line 7	Chunui towards Seongnam
Wonjong towards Ilsan	Seohae Line	Sosa towards Wonsi
