= Gulpocheon station =

Metro station in Incheon, South Korea

Coordinates: 37.50695°N 126.73148°E

굴포천; Gulpocheon
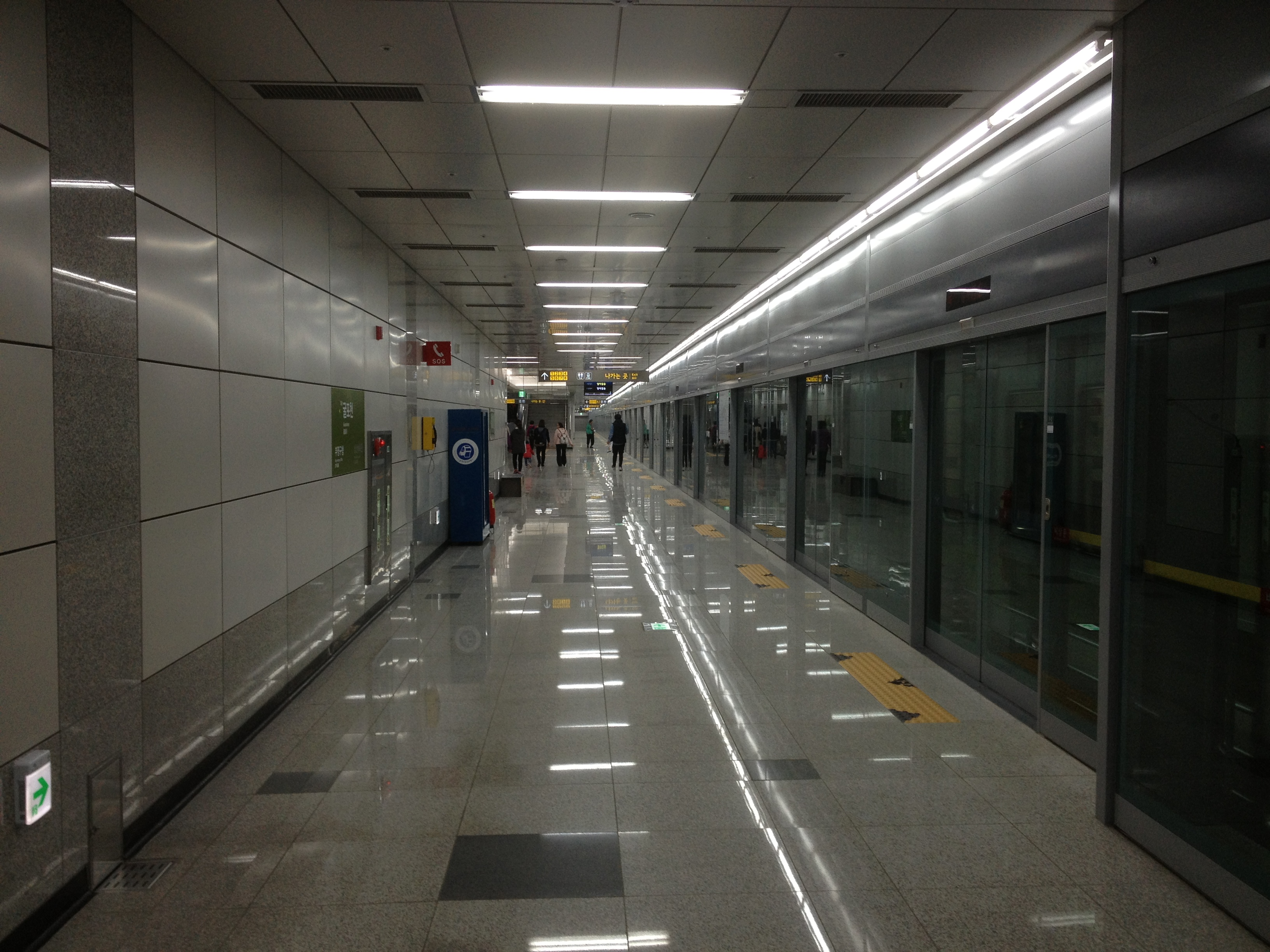

Korean name
- Hangul: 굴포천역
- Hanja: 掘浦川驛
- Revised Romanization: Gulpocheon-yeok
- McCune–Reischauer: Kulp'och'ŏn-yŏk

General information
- Location: Bupyeong-gu, Incheon
- Operator: Incheon Transit Corporation
- Line: Line 7
- Platforms: 2
- Tracks: 2

Construction
- Structure type: Underground

Key dates
- October 27, 2012: Line 7 opened
Location

Gulpocheon Station is a railway station on Seoul Subway Line 7.

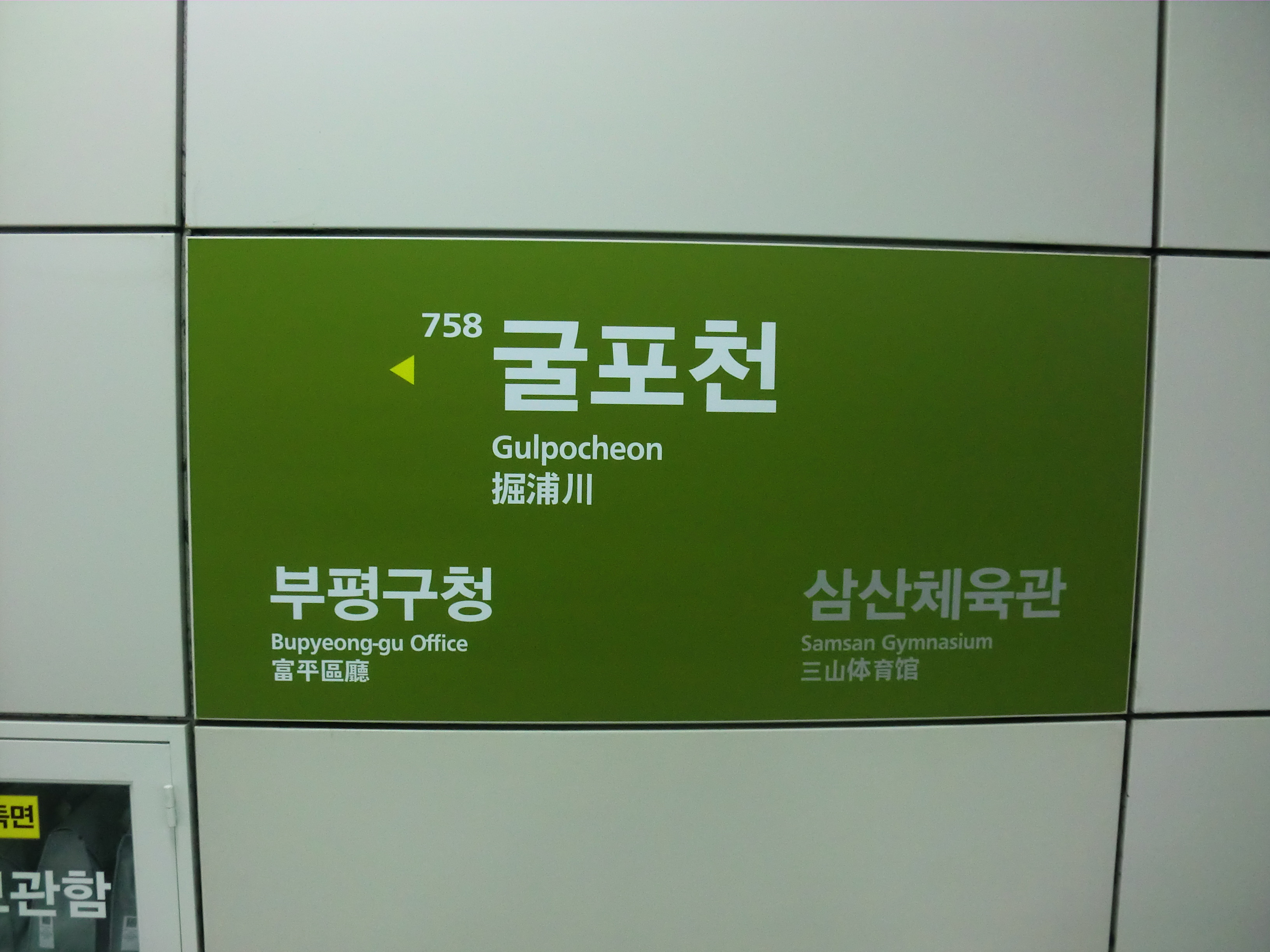

== Station layout ==
Samsan Gymnasium ↑
S/B | | N/B
↓ Bupyeong-gu Office

Southbound	← ● Line 7 toward Seongnam
Northbound	● Line 7 toward Jangam →

Preceding station	Seoul Metropolitan Subway	Following station
Samsan Gymnasium towards Jangam	Line 7	Bupyeong-gu Office towards Seongnam
