= Bucheon University =

Coordinates: 37.49°N 126.779°E

Bucheon College
- Type: Private
- Established: 1958
- Administrative staff: 90
- Students: 7705
- Location: Bucheon, Gyeonggi, South Korea
- Website: http://www.bc.ac.kr/

- Bucheon University
- Hangul: 부천대학
- Hanja: 富川大學
- RR: Bucheon daehak
- MR: Puch'ŏn taehak

Bucheon University is a private technical college in Bucheon City, Gyeonggi province, South Korea. Although private, it has strong cooperative relationships with the Bucheon city government. The school employs about 90 instructors, and offers instruction in fields such as construction, electronics, and management.

== See also ==
- List of colleges and universities in South Korea
- Education in South Korea
