= Sang-dong station =

Metro station in Bucheon, South Korea

Coordinates: 37.50577°N 126.75308°E

| 상동 (인본병원); Sang-dong (Inbone Hospital) |
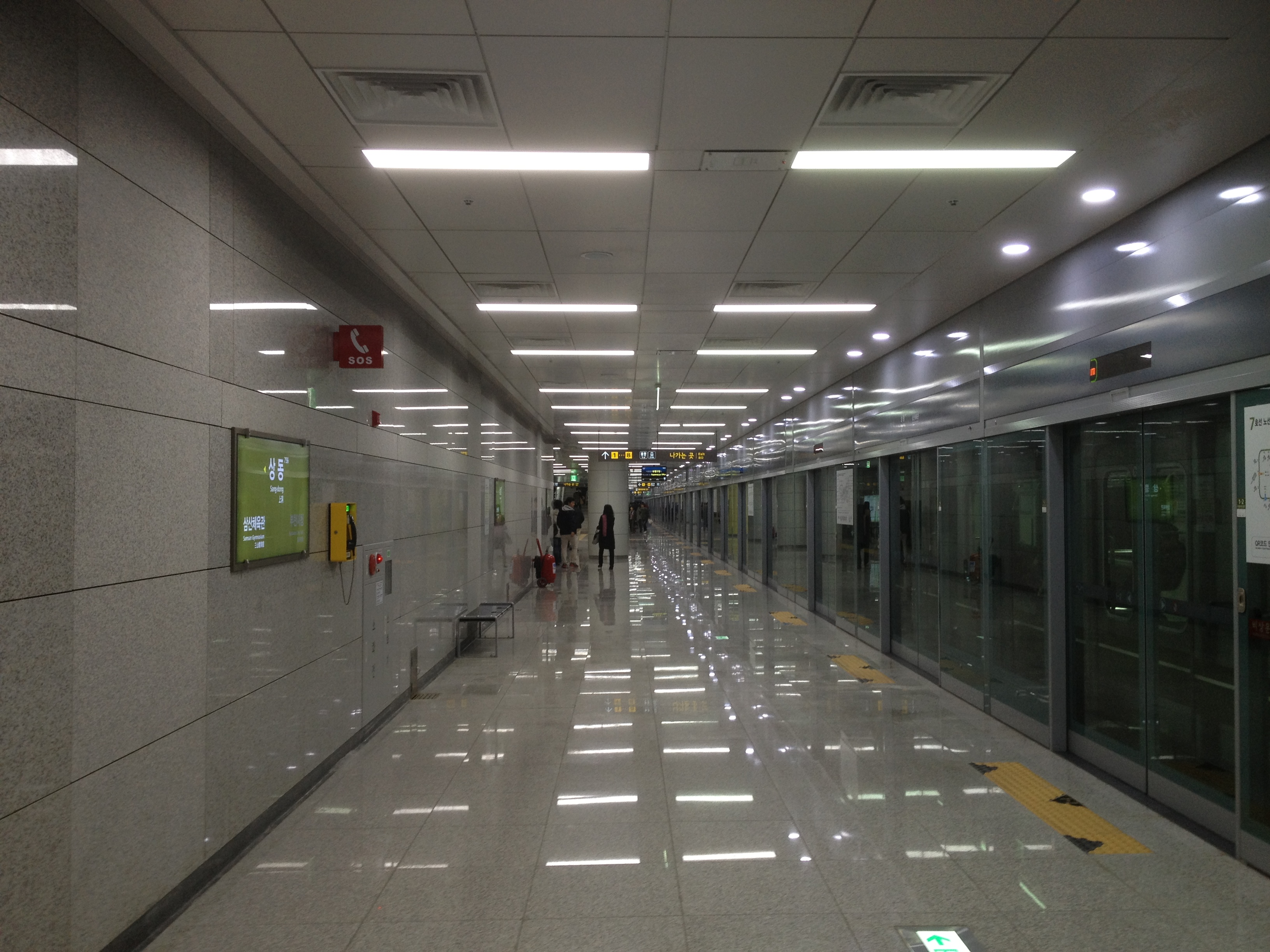

Korean name
- Hangul: 상동역
- Hanja: 上洞驛
- Revised Romanization: Sangdongnyeok
- McCune–Reischauer: Sangdongnyŏk

General information
- Location: Sang-dong, Bucheon
- Operator: Incheon Transit Corporation
- Line: Line 7
- Platforms: 2
- Tracks: 2

Construction
- Structure type: Underground

Key dates
- October 27, 2012: Line 7 opened
Location

Sang-dong Station (Korean: 상동역) is a railway station on Seoul Subway Line 7. It is located in Bucheon between Seoul and Incheon. It was previously known as Sang-ri, but that name was changed to its modern name Sang-dong, after Bucheon's status was elevated to Bucheon-si.

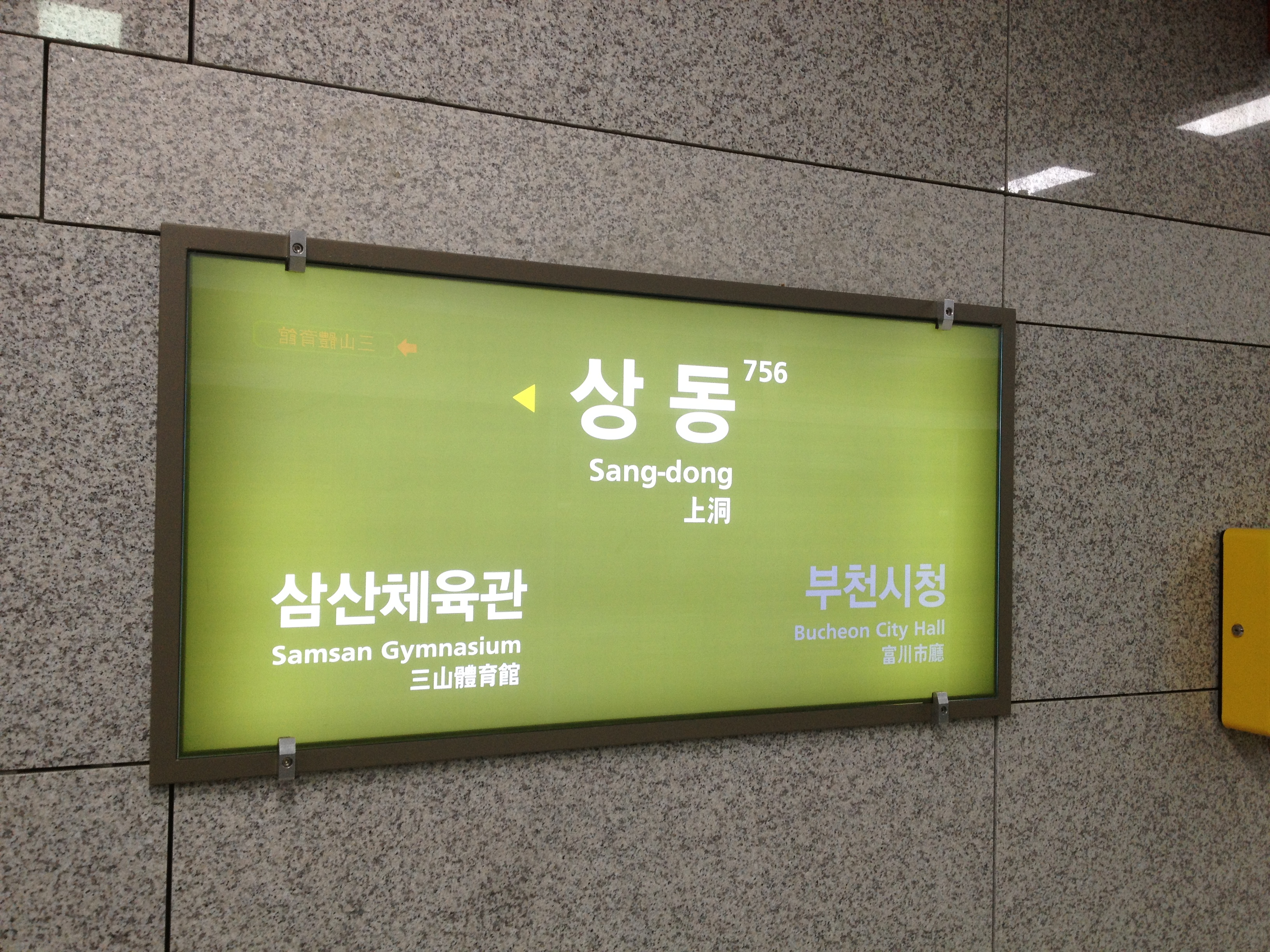

== Station layout ==
Bucheon City Hall ↑
S/B | | N/B
↓ Samsan Gymnasium

| Southbound | ← ● Line 7 toward Seongnam |
| Northbound | ● Line 7 toward Jangam → |

| Preceding station | Seoul Metropolitan Subway | Following station |
|---|---|---|
| Bucheon City Hall towards Jangam | Line 7 | Samsan Gymnasium towards Seongnam |
