= Bucheon =

City in Gyeonggi, South Korea

- Specific city
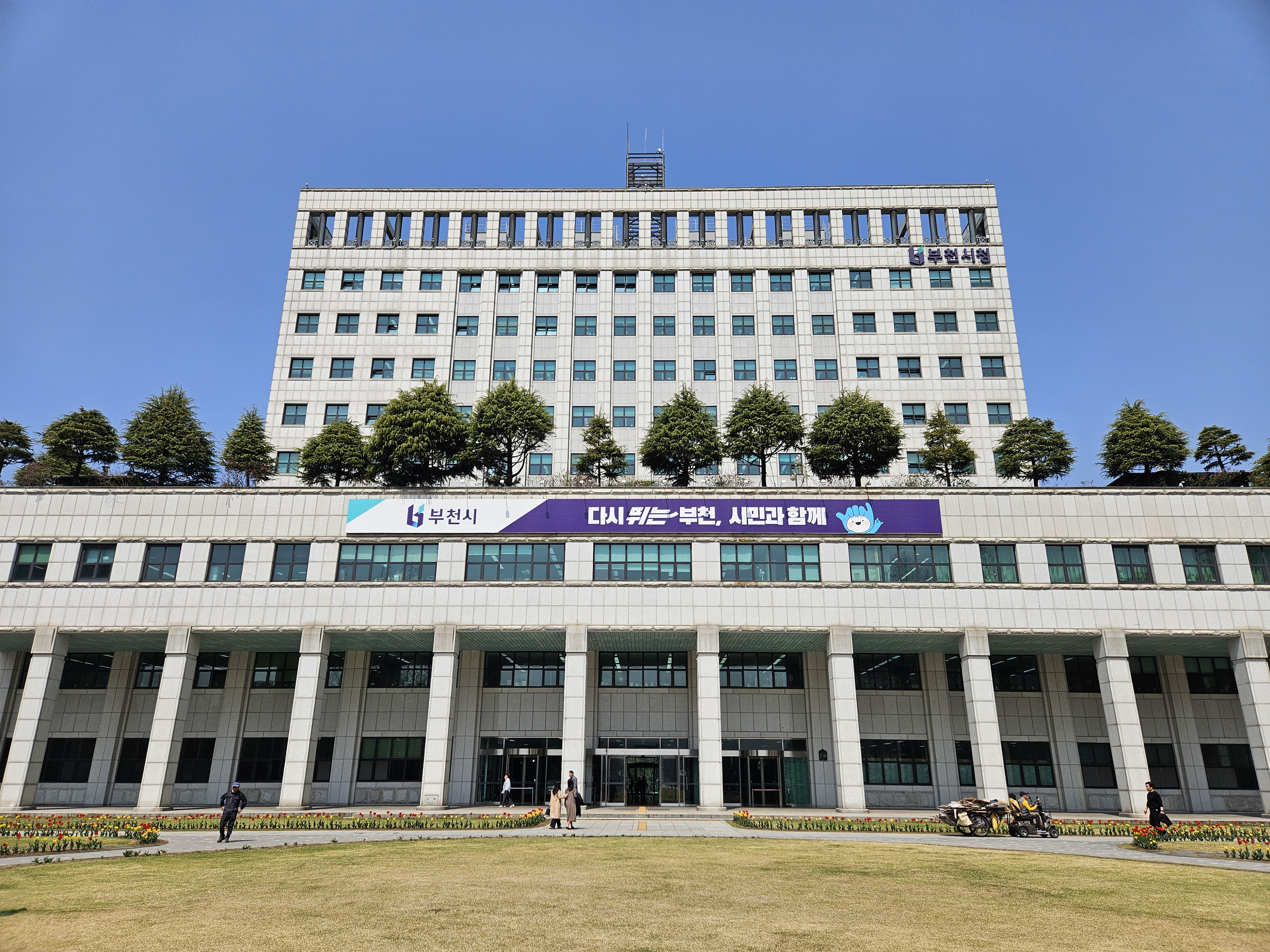
- Panoramic view of Bucheon City Hall

- Flag Emblem of Bucheon

- Coordinates: 37°30′N 126°47′E
- Country: South Korea
- Region: Gyeonggi Province (Sudogwon)
- Administrative divisions: 10 dong

Government
  - Mayor: Cho Yong-ik (Democratic)

Area
  - Total: 53.44 km^{2} (20.63 sq mi)
- Elevation: 16 m (52 ft)

Population (September 2024)
  - Total: 772,450
  - Density: 16,660.78/km^{2} (43,151.2/sq mi)
  - Dialect: Gyeonggi
- Postal code: 14400-14899
- Area code: (+82)-32-6xx
- Website: www.Bucheon.go.kr (in English)

Korean name
- Hangul: 부천시
- Hanja: 富川市
- RR: Bucheon-si
- MR: Puch'ŏn-si

Bucheon (Korean: 부천; Korean pronunciation: [pu.tɕʰʌn]) is a city in Gyeonggi Province, South Korea. Bucheon is located 25 kilometers (16 mi) away from Seoul, of which it is a satellite city. It is located between Incheon and Seoul.

Bucheon is the second most densely populated city in South Korea after Seoul, and as a result, administrative districts were abolished in July 2016 in favor of providing greater public service in community centers.

Major manufacturing operations are located in the northern areas of the city, while the areas in the south where Seoul Subway Line 7 and Seoul Subway Line 1 pass are dense commercial and residential areas.

== History ==
In 1914, the outer areas of Incheon (including Gwangyo-dong, old Incheon's city center) and Bupyeong County were joined under the name Bucheon. In 1931, Gyenam township (myeon, 계남면) was renamed Sosa township (myeon, 소사면). In 1936, the westernmost part of Bucheon, then part of old Incheon, was incorporated in Incheon and in 1940 some other part of old Incheon belonging to Bucheon Country was incorporated in Incheon again while part of old Bupyeong was annexed to Incheon at the same time. In 1941, Sosa township promoted to eup (town) status.

On January 1, 1963, when the great expansion of Seoul was implemented, several districts were combined to Yeongdeungpo District of Seoul as below.

Old districts		New districts	
Ojeong-myeon	Ogok-ri and Osoe-ri	Yeongdeungpo-gu, Seoul	Ogok-ri, Osoe-ri, Hang-ri, Onsu-ri, Gung-ri, Cheonwang-ri, Oryu-ri, Gaebong-ri and Gocheok-ri
Sosa-eup	Hang-ri, Onsu-ri, Gung-ri, Cheonwang-ri, Oryu-ri, Gaebong-ri and Gocheok-ri	Yeongdeungpo-gu, Seoul	Ogok-ri, Osoe-ri, Hang-ri, Onsu-ri, Gung-ri, Cheonwang-ri, Oryu-ri, Gaebong-ri and Gocheok-ri

In 1988, two districts were established. Bucheon was divided into Nam-gu ("south", 남구) and Jung-gu ("central", 중구) along the Seoul-Incheon trainline. Present day Sosa-gu was formerly called Nam-gu.

In 1993, Bucheon's Jung-gu was separated into two further districts, forming Wonmi (원미구) and Ojeong (오정구) Districts.

The three districts were abolished in July 2016 as Bucheon decided to become a unified city without any administrative districts. However, on January 1, 2024, the Bucheon municipal government decided to return the three districts, along with the creation of 37 new administrative districts (or dongs).

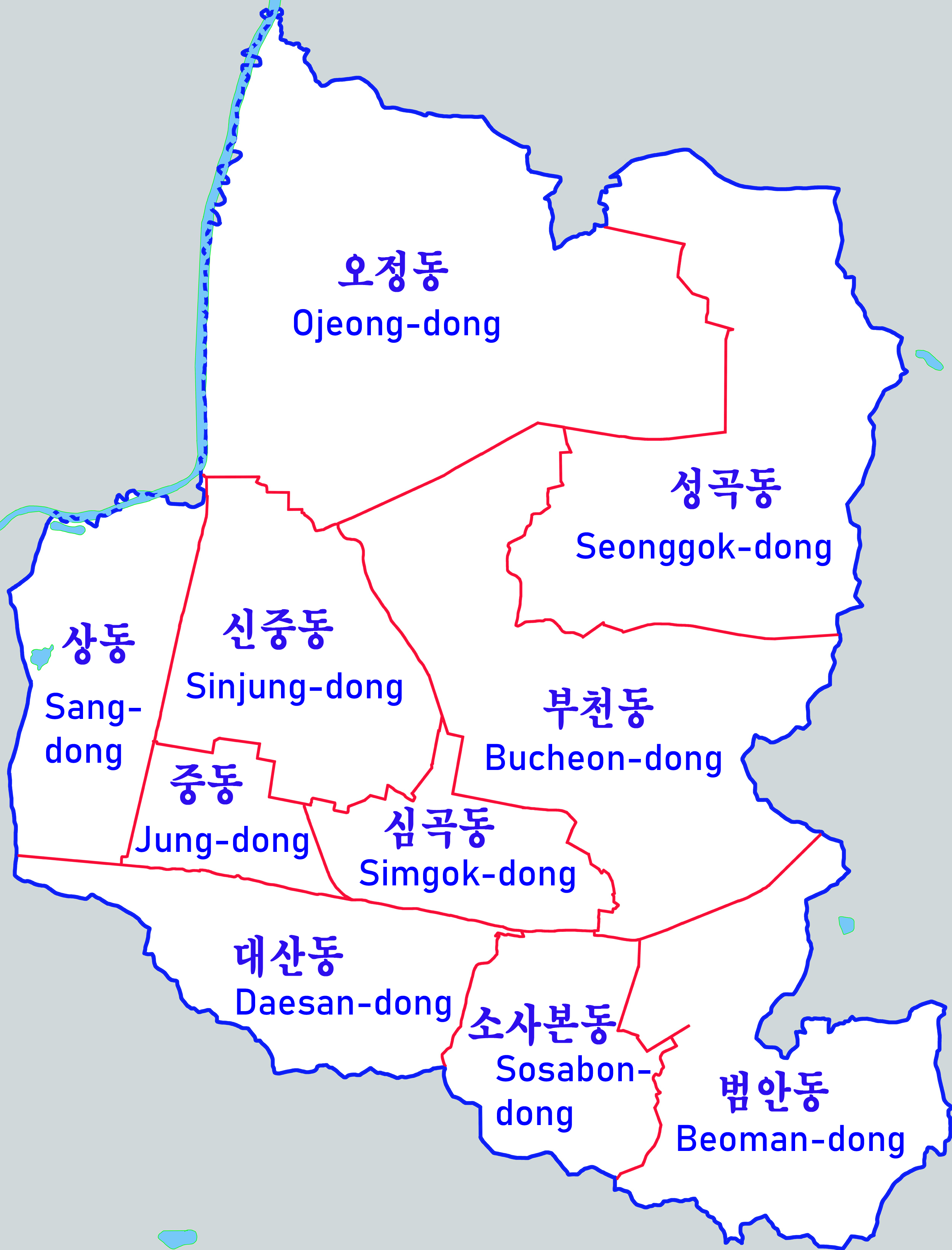
Neighborhoods of Bucheon (as of 2019)

== Statistics ==
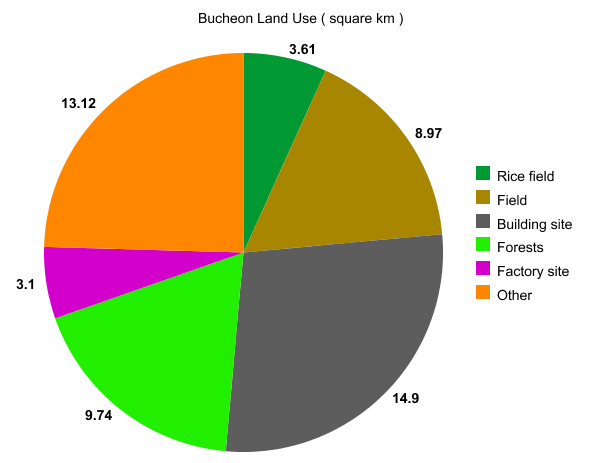

== Arts and education ==
Bucheon promotes itself as the cultural centre of the Seoul Metropolitan Area. The Bucheon Philharmonic Orchestra is located there, an annual international film festival is held in July called the Bucheon International Fantastic Film Festival or BiFan, and an annual international bboy competition called Bucheon Bboy International Championship (BBIC) held by Jinjo Crew since 2016.

Bucheon's institutions of higher education include: Bucheon College, Yuhan College, Catholic University of Korea Bucheon campus, and Seoul Theological University.

The city was designated "City of Literature" and has been part of the UNESCO Creative Cities Network since 2017.

== Festival ==
- Bucheon Aiins World festival - The miniature theme park Aiins World is hosting the World Nightview Fantasy Lighting Festival. There are famous buildings like the Eiffel Tower in France. The festival runs from 6 p.m. to 11 p.m. all year long, and is closed on rainy days. The last admission is at 10 p.m.
- Bucheon B-Boy International Championship (BBIC) - An international B-Boy competition held by world-famous B-Boy group Jinjo Crew.

Year	Winner	Runner up	Semi-finalists	Quarter-finalists
2016	Gamblerz	Body Carnival	Drifterz; Knucklehead Zoo	Red Bull BC One All-Stars; Predatorz; Skechers All-Stars; The Ruggeds
2017	Vagabonds	Red Bull BC One All-Stars	Flooriorz; Gamblerz	Polskee Flavou; Team China; K-Rookiez; Navi
2018	Team Europe	{Red Bull BC One All-Stars	Fusion MC; Bboy World Asia	Hustle Kidz; Flow Mo; Body Carnival; Monster Bboys
2019	Red Bull BC One All-Stars	Modern Skillz	Squadron; Green Panda	Project China; 11 High Low; Good Vibration; Foundnation
2020	Flooriorz	The Ruggeds	Red Bull BC One All-Stars; Drifterz	Dream Runnerz; Vinotinto; Top 9; Super Cr3w
2021	Seoul Skillz	Fusion MC	Artistreet; Last for One	TG Breakers; Jeju Steez; South Indianz; Nexxo
2022	Alvin	Phil Wizardz	Vero; Gravity	Kae; Issin; Amir; Robb

== Climate ==
Bucheon has a humid continental climate (Köppen: Dwa), but can be considered a borderline humid subtropical climate (Köppen: Cwa) using the −3 °C (27 °F) isotherm.

Climate data for Bucheon (2004–2020 normals)
Month	Jan	Feb	Mar	Apr	May	Jun	Jul	Aug	Sep	Oct	Nov	Dec	Year
Mean daily maximum °C (°F)	2.8 (37.0)	5.6 (42.1)	11.2 (52.2)	17.5 (63.5)	23.6 (74.5)	27.7 (81.9)	29.1 (84.4)	30.8 (87.4)	26.6 (79.9)	20.7 (69.3)	12.5 (54.5)	4.3 (39.7)	17.7 (63.9)
Daily mean °C (°F)	−1.1 (30.0)	1.4 (34.5)	6.6 (43.9)	12.5 (54.5)	18.4 (65.1)	22.9 (73.2)	25.4 (77.7)	26.9 (80.4)	22.2 (72.0)	15.9 (60.6)	8.4 (47.1)	0.6 (33.1)	13.3 (55.9)
Mean daily minimum °C (°F)	−4.6 (23.7)	−2.3 (27.9)	2.6 (36.7)	8.3 (46.9)	13.9 (57.0)	19.1 (66.4)	22.6 (72.7)	23.8 (74.8)	18.4 (65.1)	11.4 (52.5)	4.4 (39.9)	−2.9 (26.8)	9.6 (49.3)
Average precipitation mm (inches)	11.6 (0.46)	25.4 (1.00)	34.9 (1.37)	65.1 (2.56)	87.8 (3.46)	110.0 (4.33)	391.5 (15.41)	207.8 (8.18)	147.4 (5.80)	46.9 (1.85)	58.4 (2.30)	18.2 (0.72)	1,205 (47.44)
Average precipitation days (≥ 0.1 mm)	3.1	3.4	5.2	7.5	6.6	7.4	14.3	10.9	7.7	4.5	7.4	5.8	83.8
Source: Korea Meteorological Administration

== Transportation ==
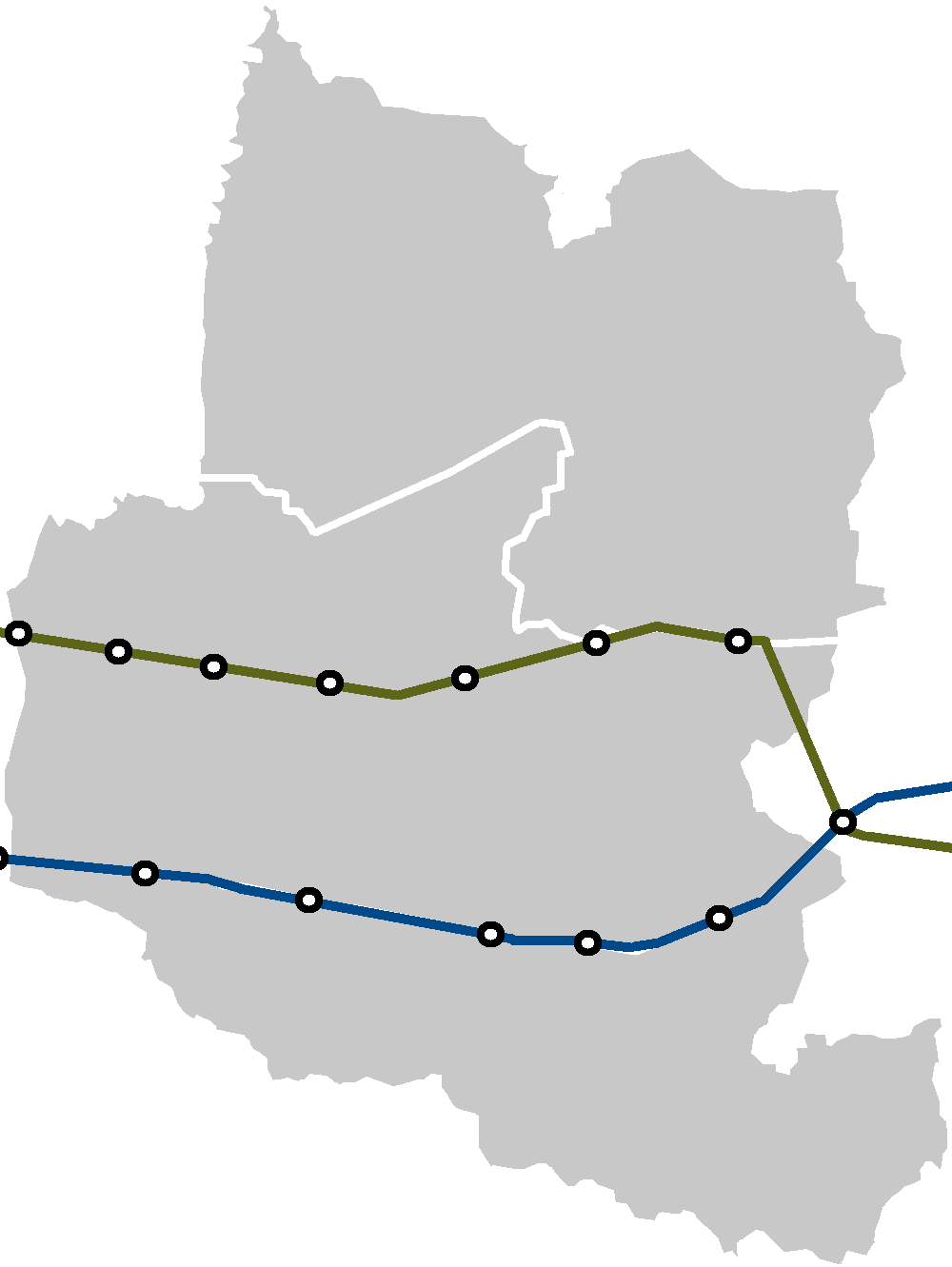
Map of Seoul Metro lines passing through Bucheon over its municipal districts before 2018

Bucheon has an extensive bus network of local and area buses that connect the city to Seoul, Incheon and other surrounding cities. Bucheon Bus Terminal has buses connecting to different cities and provinces throughout the country. The Seoul Subway System Line 1 and Line 7 runs through Bucheon. There are currently five stations in Seoul Subway Line Line 1 within Bucheon, including Bucheon station and Songnae station, and seven stations in the Line 7, including Kkachiul, Bucheon Stadium, Chunui, Sinjung-dong, Bucheon City Hall, and Sang-dong, which continues through Incheon ending at Seongnam station (Incheon).

Two more subway lines were recently added. The Sosa-Wonsi Line opened in 2018, connecting Bucheon's Sosa station of the Line 1 with Ansan's Choji station of Seoul Subway Line 4. The Daegok-Sosa Line opened in 2022, connecting with the Sosa-Wonsi Line as a single line. It will provide subway service in the northern area of Bucheon and connect the city to Gimpo International Airport station where transfers to Seoul Subway Line 5, Seoul Subway Line 9, AREX and Gimpo Goldline will be available. The line terminates at Daegok station in Goyang, which offers a transfer to Seoul Subway Line 3 and Gyeongui-Jungang Line.

In addition, the city is getting a completely new subway line in the future which will connect Bucheon's northern Wonjeong area to Hongik University station.

== Religion ==
There are a number of churches in Bucheon, including a Full Gospel Church near Lotte Department Store and the English-language "Bucheon Onnuri English Ministry" (BOEM) in Sang Dong. There is also a Church of Jesus Christ of Latter-day Saints located a short ways north of Bucheon station. Evangelism and mission is a key expression of Christianity in the Bucheon churches. There is also Seogwangsa Temple, beside Weonmisan Mountain.

== Notable people ==
- Byun Baek-hyun, singer and actor, member of boy band Exo
- Choi Sang-hyun, illustrator and character designer
- Sora Choi, fashion model
- Choi Sung-hee, singer, composer, musical actress and television presenter, member of S.E.S. under the stage name Bada
- Choi Ye-rim, singer and dancer, member of the girl groups Loona, Odd Eye Circle and ARTMS under the stage name Choerry.
- Chu Ye-jin, actress
- Jo Jin-ho, singer-songwriter, member of boy band Pentagon
- Kim Hee-jung, actress
- Katie Kim, singer
- Kim Seol-hyun, singer and actress
- Yuna Kim, retired figure skater and Olympic gold medallist
- Lee Ha-yi, singer-songwriter known by the stage name Lee Hi
- Moon Byul-yi, singer-songwriter, rapper and dancer, member of girl group Mamamoo under the stage name Moonbyul
- Ryu Soo-young, actor
- Song I-han, singer-songwriter
- Won Ji-an, actress

== Sports ==
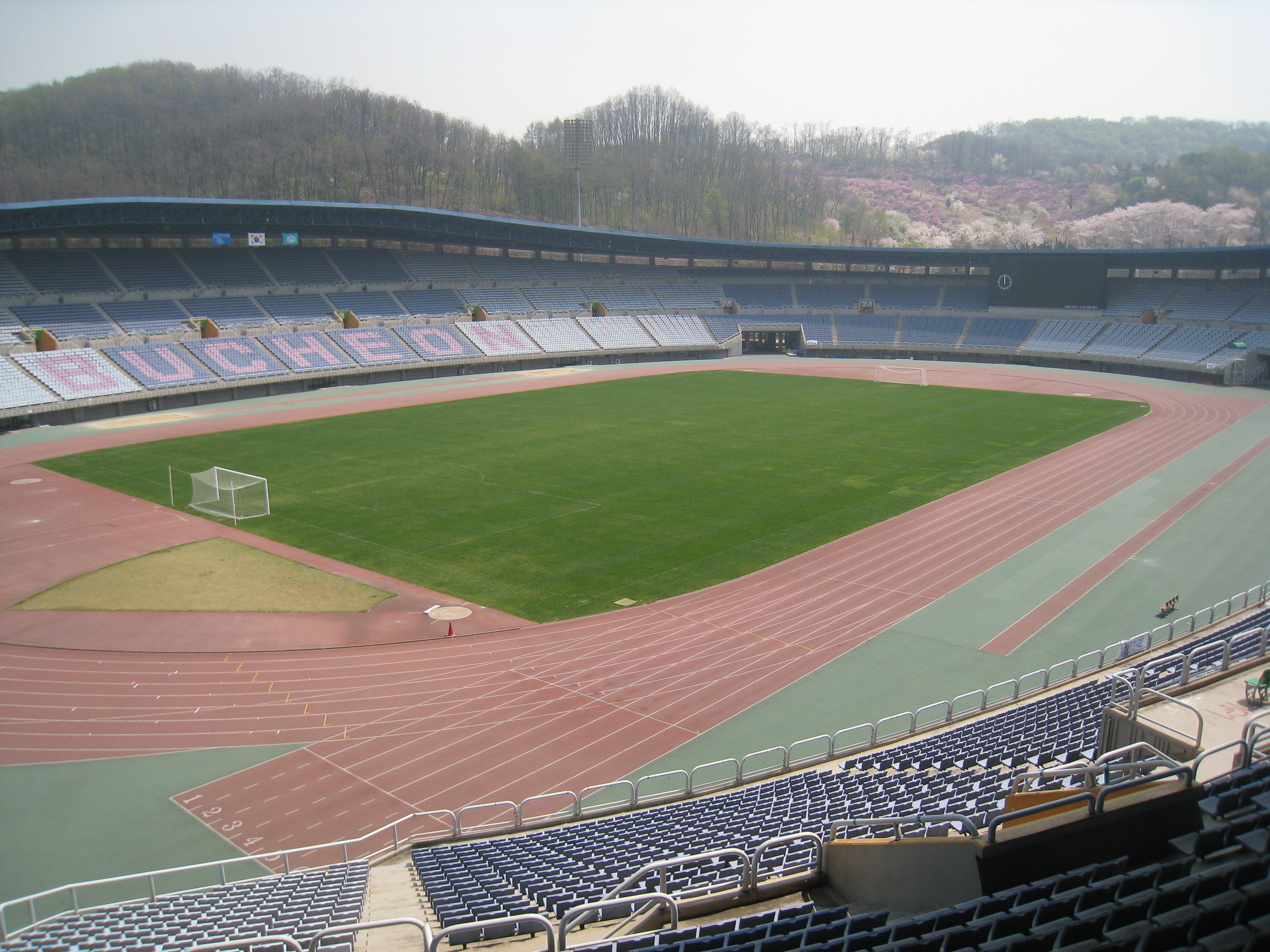
Bucheon Stadium

Bucheon is home to the K League 1 football team Bucheon FC 1995 and the Women's Korean Basketball League women's basketball team Bucheon Hana Bank. Bucheon FC 1995 earned promotion to K League 1 for the first time after the 2025 season and began its first top-flight campaign in 2026.

== See also ==
- List of cities in South Korea
- Geography of South Korea
- Seoul National Capital Area

== Twin towns – sister cities ==
Bucheon is twinned with:

- Bakersfield, United States (2006)
- Harbin, China (1995)
- Khabarovsk, Russia (2002)
- Valenzuela, Philippines (2008)

=== Friendship cities ===
- Okayama, Japan (2002)
- Kawasaki, Japan (1996)
- Weihai, China (2000)
