= Geomdan Sageori station =

Metro station in Incheon, South Korea

I203 검단사거리 (검단수한방병원) Geomdan Sageori (Geomdansu Oriental Medicine Hospital)
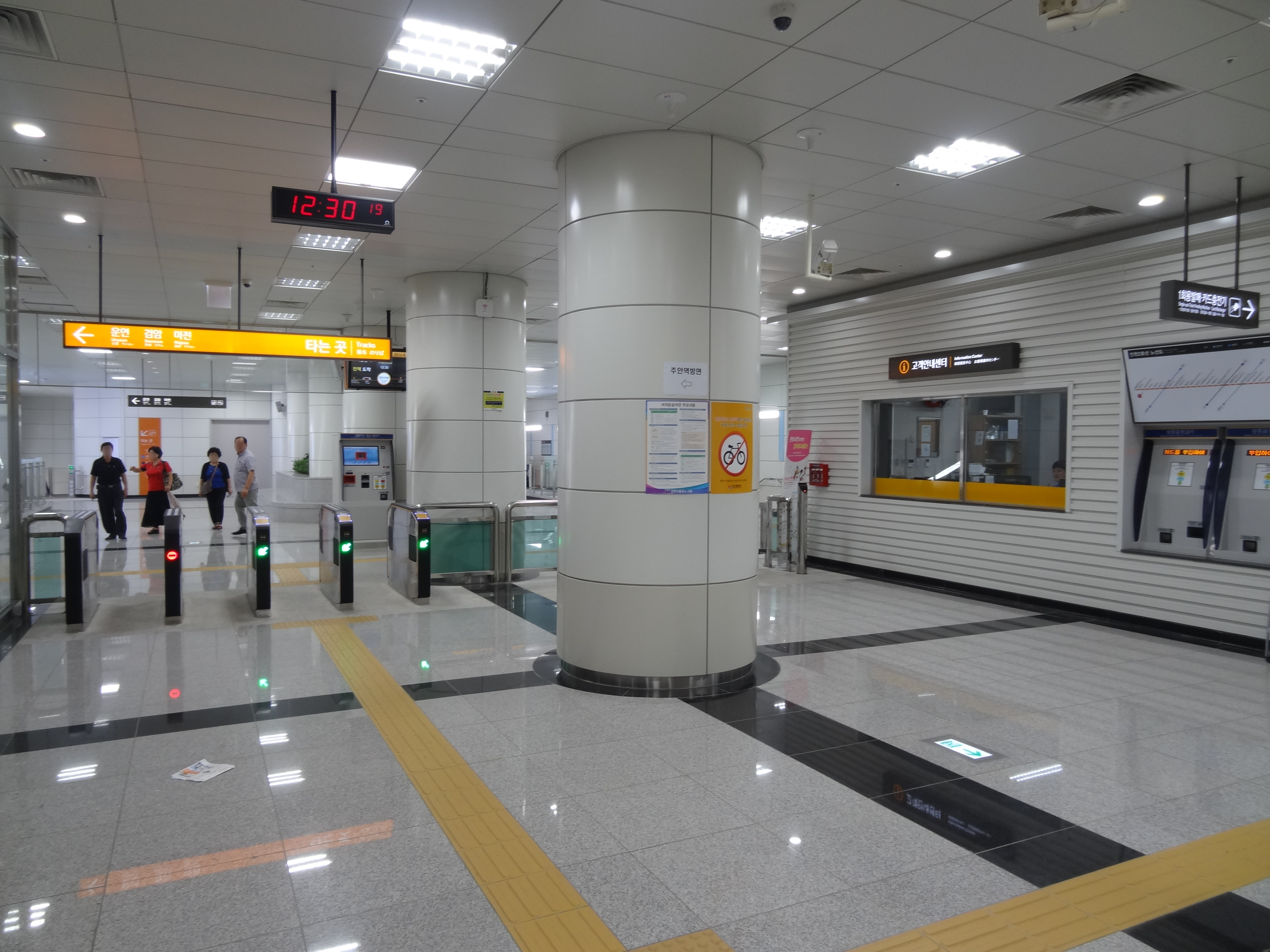

Korean name
- Hangul: 검단사거리역
- Hanja: 黔丹四거리驛
- Revised Romanization: Geomdan sageori yeok
- McCune–Reischauer: Kŏmtan sakŏri yŏk

General information
- Location: 234-1 Wangil-dong, Geomdan District, Incheon
- Coordinates: 37°36′07″N 126°39′27″E
- Operator: Incheon Transit Corporation
- Line: Incheon Line 2
- Platforms: 2
- Tracks: 2

Construction
- Structure type: Aboveground

Other information
- Station code: I203

History
- Opened: July 30, 2016

Services
| Preceding station | Incheon Subway | Following station |
|---|---|---|
| Wanggil towards Geomdan Oryu | Incheon Line 2 | Majeon towards Unyeon |
Location

Geomdan Sageori Station (Korean: 검단사거리역; Hanja: 黔丹四거리驛) is an underground station on Line 2 of the Incheon Subway in Geomdan District, Incheon, South Korea. The station subname is Geomdansu Oriental Medicine Hospital. After its opening on July 30, 2016, the survey of passengers showed that Incheon Metropolitan Subway Line 2 had the most passengers, but at present, Seo-gu Office station surpassed the number of users. The "Sageori" means "intersection" in Korean.

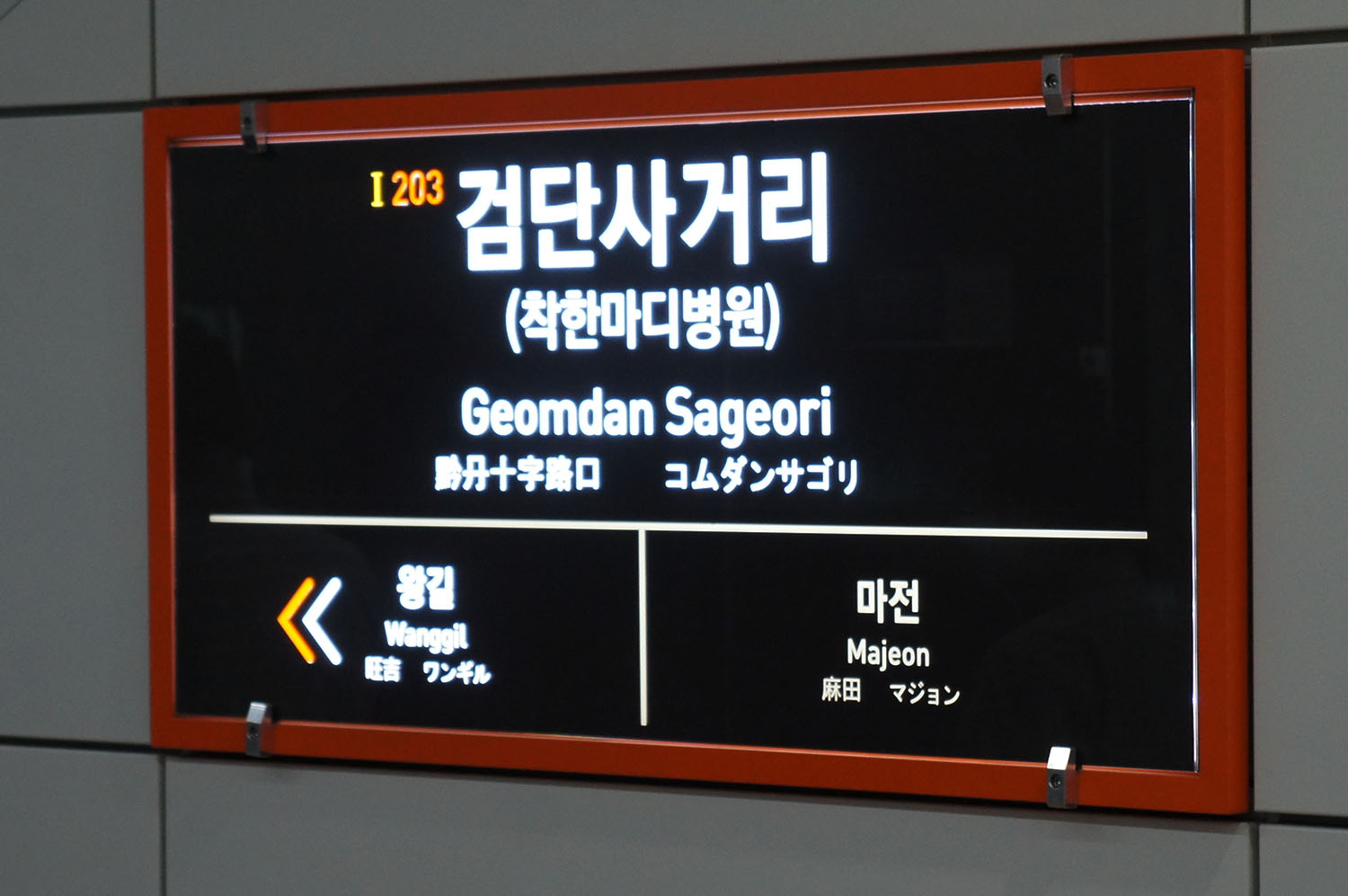

== Station layout ==
| G | Street Level | Exits |
| L1 | Concourse | Faregates, Ticketing Machines, Station Control |
| L2; Platforms | Side platform, doors will open on the right |
| L2; Platforms | Westbound | ← Incheon Line 2 toward Geomdan Oryu (Wanggil) |
| L2; Platforms | Eastbound | → Incheon Line 2 toward Unyeon (Majeon) → |
| L2; Platforms | Side platform, doors will open on the right |

== Station surrounding ==
- Geomdan Range
- Geomdan Food Town
- Geomdan 1-dong Administrative Welfare Center
- Geomdan Post Office
- Geomdan District
- Incheon Wanggil Elementary School
- Geomdan Middle School
- Incheon Geumgok Elementary School
- Geomdan Snow Cemetery
- Lotte Cinema Geomdan
- Geomdan Elderly Center
