= Gajeong Jungang Market station =

Metro station in Incheon, South Korea

I212 가정중앙시장 Gajeong Jungang Market
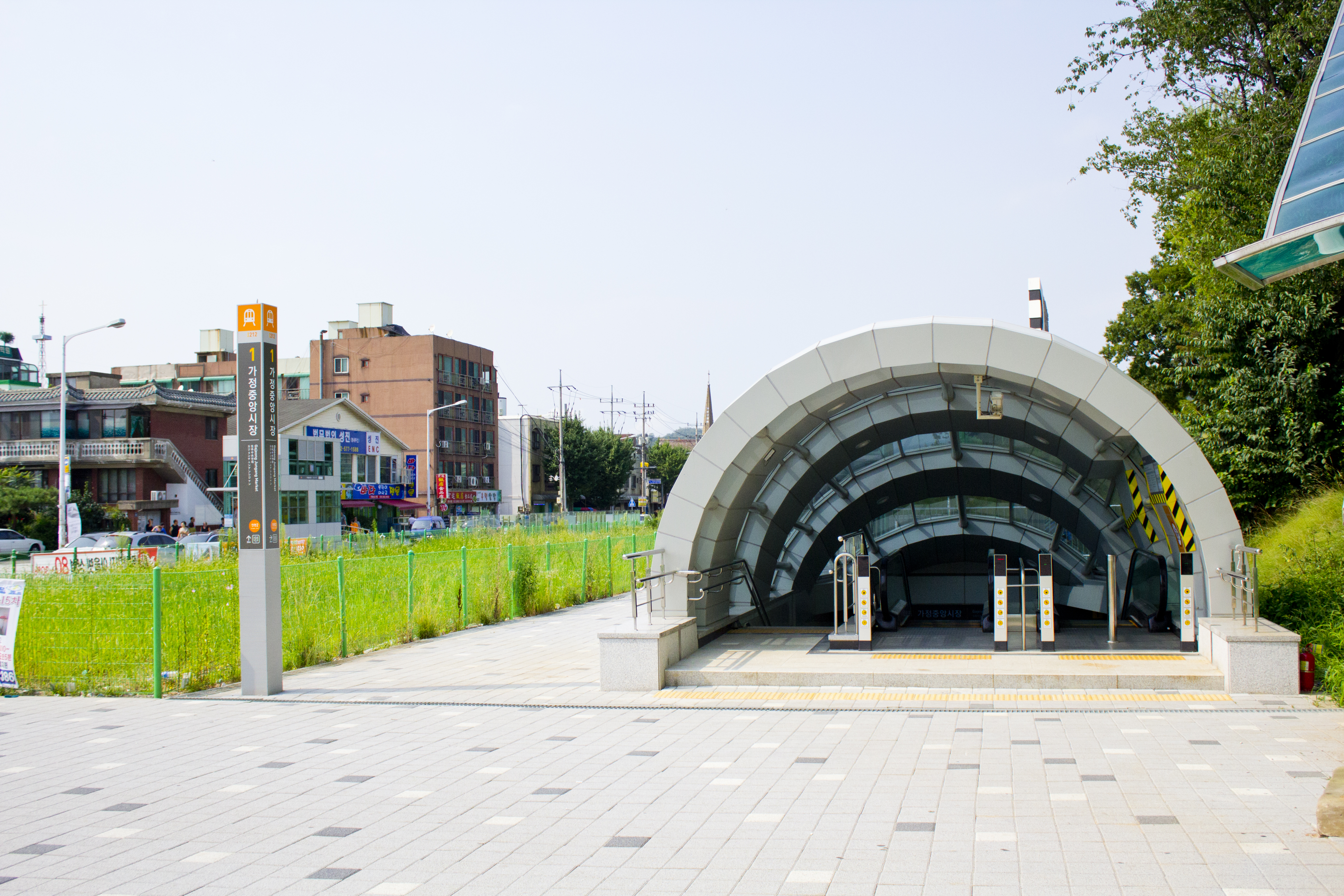
- Exit 1

Korean name
- Hangul: 가정중앙시장역
- Hanja: 佳亭中央市場驛
- Revised Romanization: Gajeong jungang sijang yeok
- McCune–Reischauer: Kajŏng chungang sijang yŏk

General information
- Location: 529 Gajeong-dong, Seohae District, Incheon
- Coordinates: 37°31′03″N 126°40′37″E
- Operator: Incheon Transit Corporation
- Line: Incheon Line 2
- Platforms: 2
- Tracks: 2

Key dates
- July 30, 2016: Incheon Line 2 opened
Location

Gajeong Jungang Market Station is a subway station on Line 2 of the Incheon Subway.

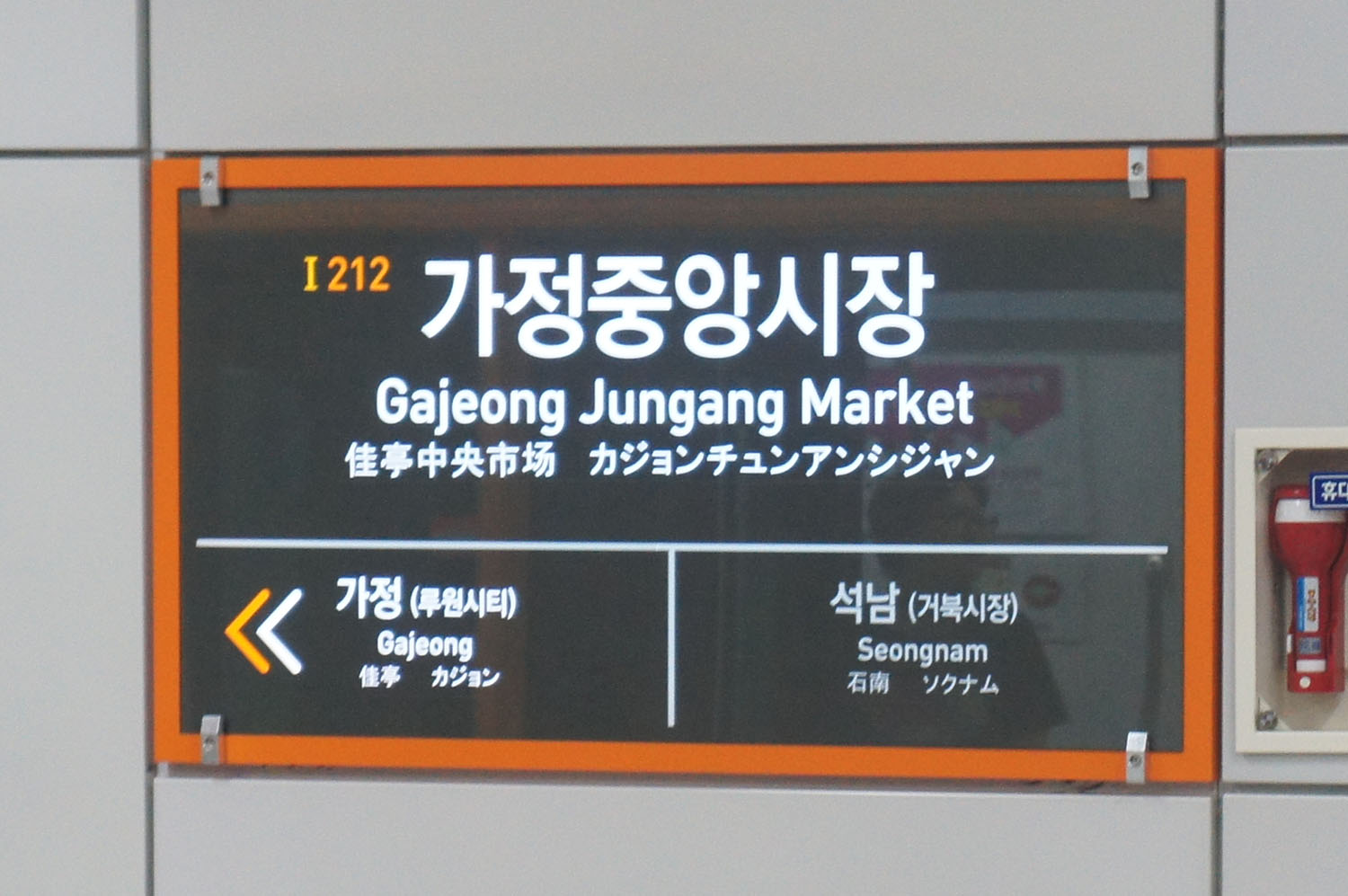
Station nameplate

Preceding station	Incheon Subway	Following station
Gajeong towards Geomdan Oryu	Incheon Line 2	Seongnam towards Unyeon
