= Asiad Stadium station =

Metro station in Incheon, South Korea

I209 아시아드경기장 (공촌사거리) Asiad Stadium (Gongchon Sageori)
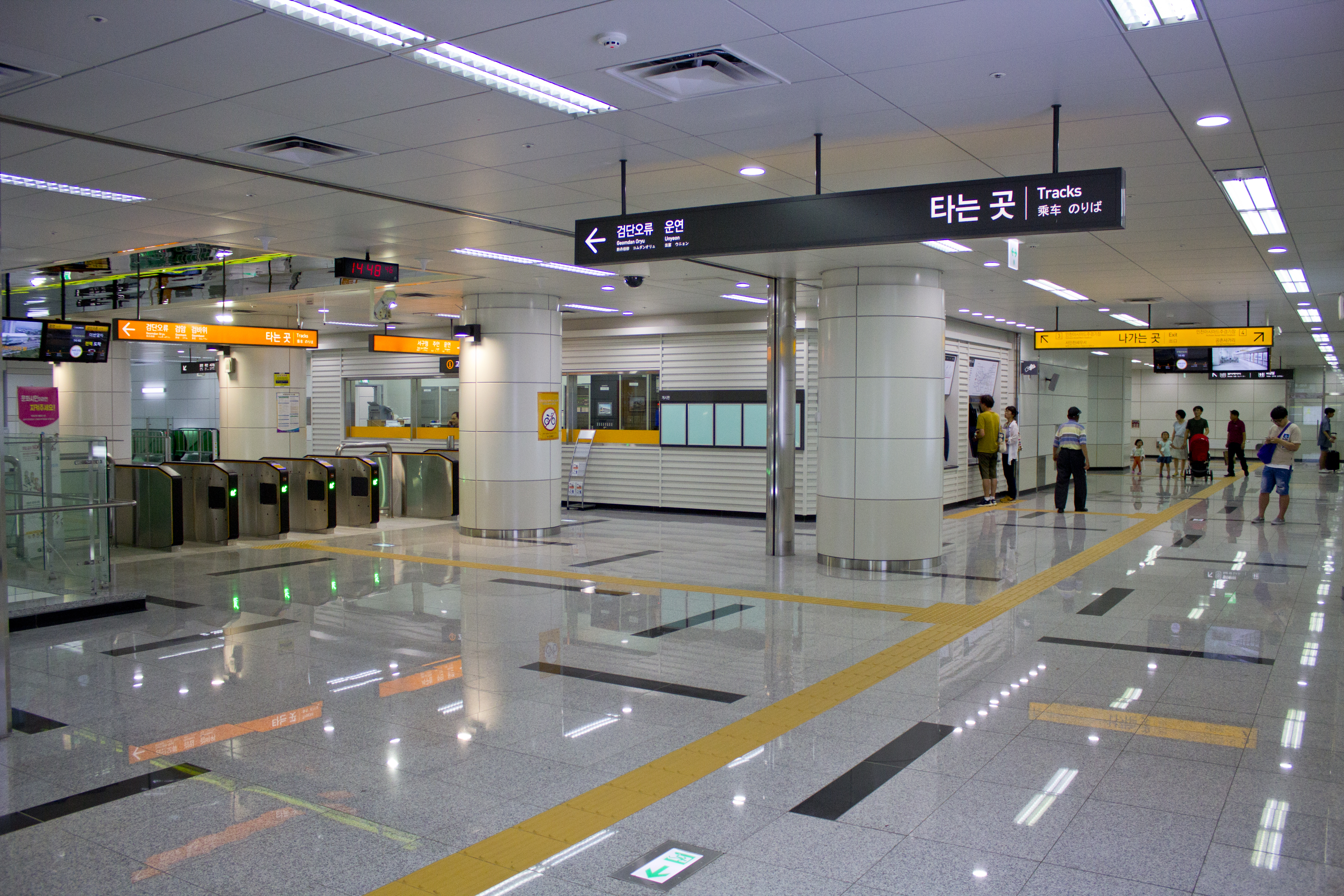
- The concourse at Asiad Stadium station in 2016

Korean name
- Hangul: 아시아드경기장역
- Hanja: 아시아드競技場驛
- Revised Romanization: Asiadeu Gyeonggijang yeok
- McCune–Reischauer: Asiadŭ kyŏnggijang yŏk

General information
- Location: 94-6 Yeonhui-dong, Seohae District, Incheon
- Coordinates: 37°33′05″N 126°40′38″E
- Operator: Incheon Transit Corporation
- Line: Incheon Line 2
- Platforms: 2
- Tracks: 2

Key dates
- July 30, 2016: Incheon Line 2 opened
Location

Asiad Stadium station is a subway station on Line 2 of the Incheon Subway.

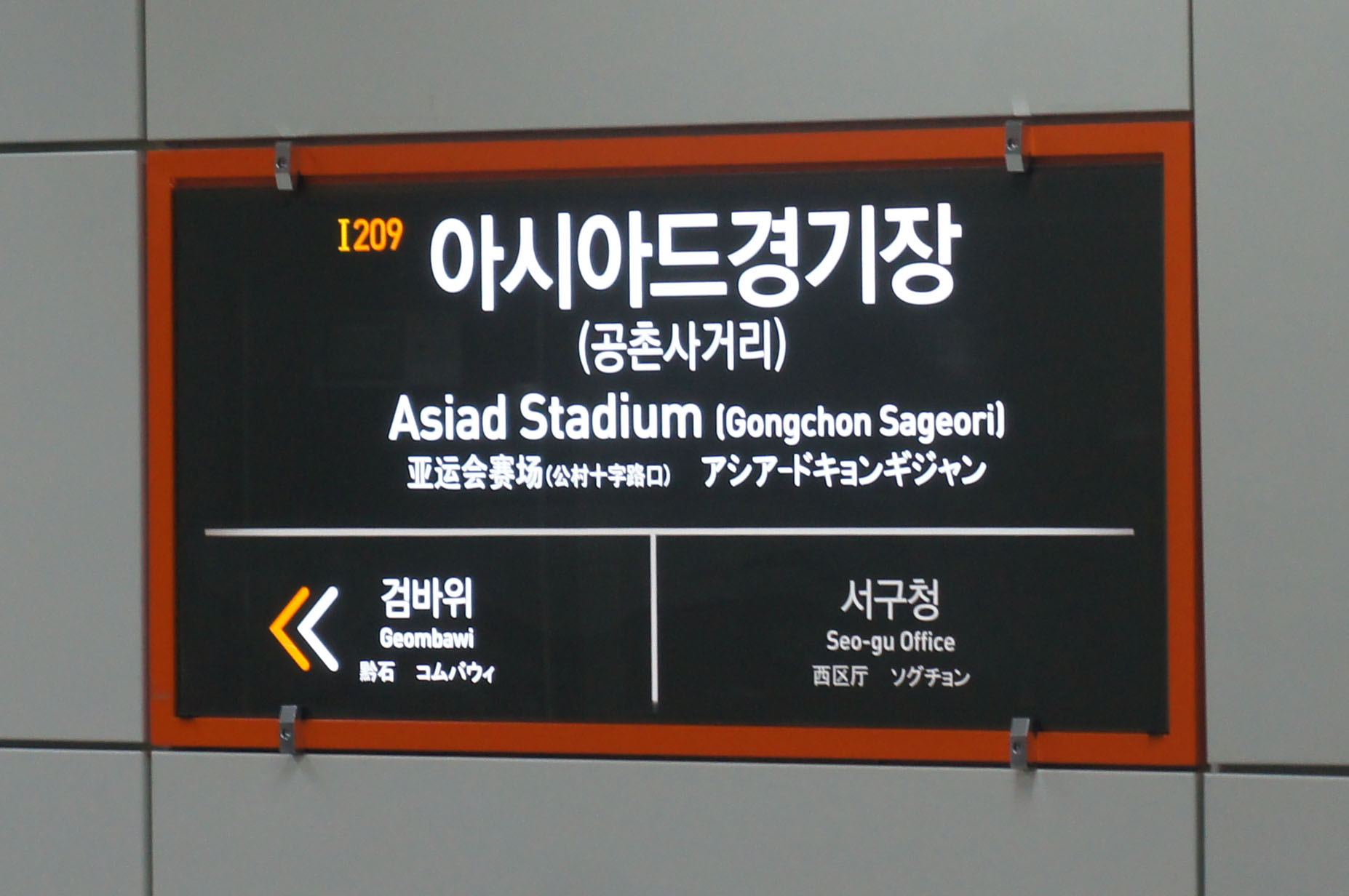
Station nameplate

| Preceding station | Incheon Subway | Following station |
|---|---|---|
| Geombawi towards Geomdan Oryu | Incheon Line 2 | Seohae-gu Office towards Unyeon |
