= LU 1 City =

Proposed city in Incheon, South Korea

The LU 1 City (short for "Leading Ubiquitous N°1 City") will be in Incheon, South Korea. It is proposed to be a part of the Incheon Free Economic Zone regional developments. It was expected to be completed by 2014, in time for the Incheon Asian Games, however the economic recession set the project back by many years. In 2016 most of the area is still bare of any construction. The proposed city will have a set of twin towers, a bus terminal, and a glass-enclosed subterranean mall called the CenterCore. The subway station already went into service in 2016.

The entire city will have four levels below street level with one above ground level for pedestrian walkways. Aside from the taxis on the ground level, automobile traffic and parking will be contained and separated to the third and fourth floors. The expressway will go under the city on the fourth level with some parking on the 2nd level. The 1st floor will be reserved entirely for pedestrians.
