= Wanjeong station =

Metro station in Incheon, South Korea

I205 완정 (검단탑종합병원) Wanjeong (Geomdan Top General Hospital)
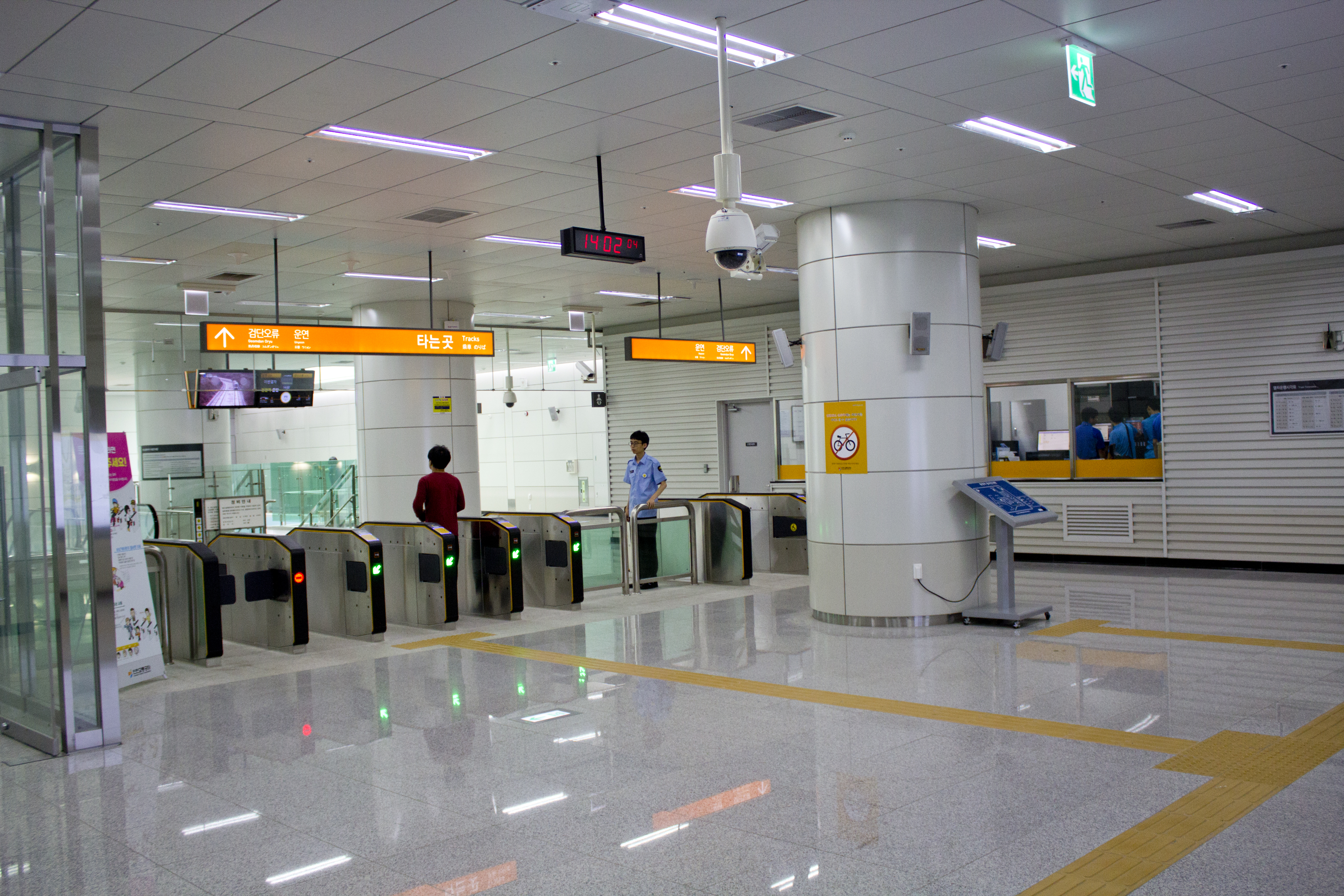

Korean name
- Hangul: 완정역
- Hanja: 完井驛
- Revised Romanization: Wanjeong yeok
- McCune–Reischauer: Wanchŏng yŏk

General information
- Location: 1077-10 Dangha-dong, Geomdan District, Incheon
- Coordinates: 37°35′34″N 126°40′23″E
- Operator: Incheon Transit Corporation
- Line: Incheon Line 2
- Platforms: 2
- Tracks: 2

Key dates
- July 30, 2016: Incheon Line 2 opened
Location

Wanjeong Station is a subway station on Line 2 of the Incheon Subway.

Preceding station	Incheon Subway	Following station
Majeon towards Geomdan Oryu	Incheon Line 2	Dokjeong towards Unyeon
