= Majeon station =

Metro station in Incheon, South Korea

I204 마전 Majeon
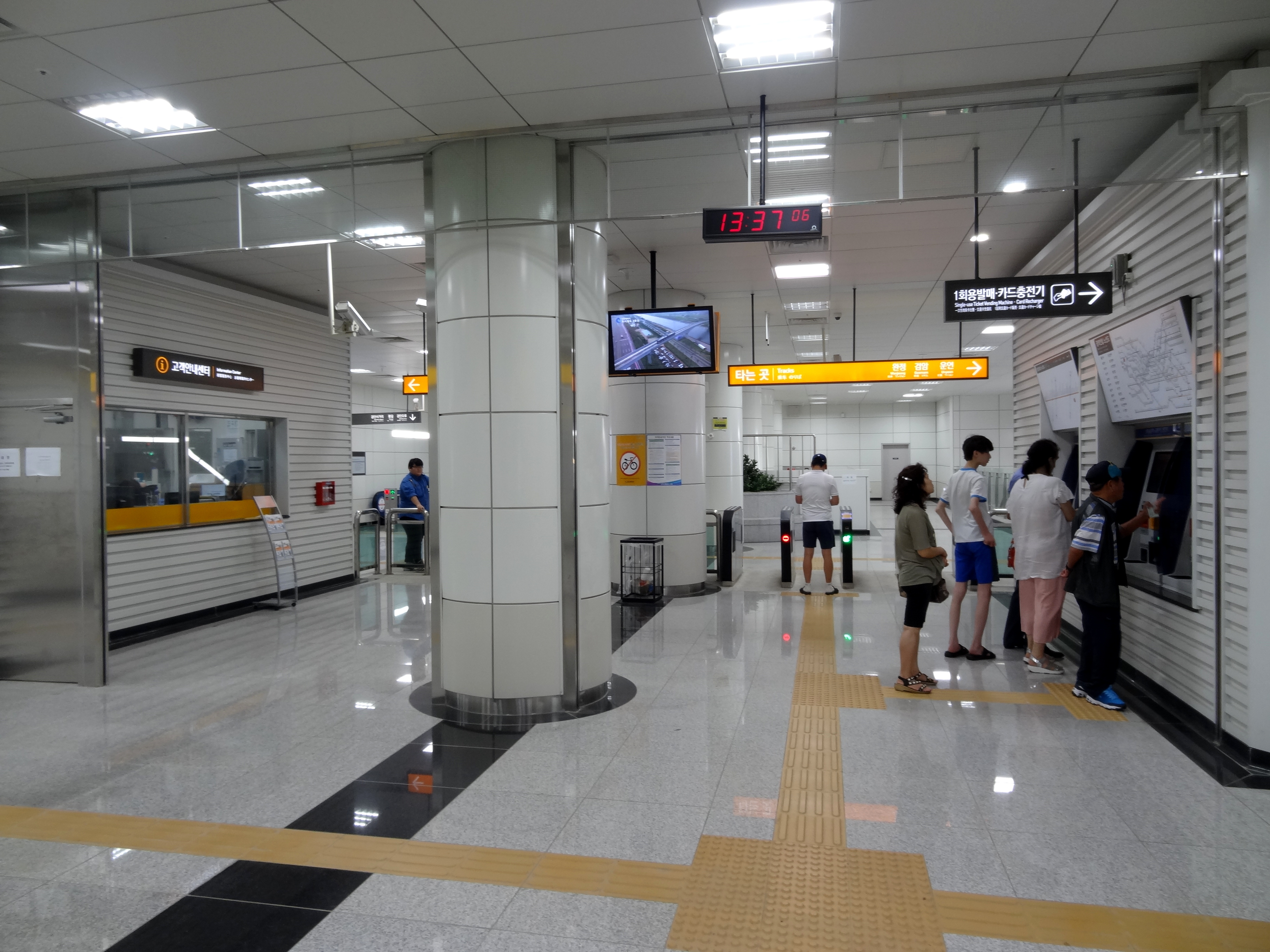

Korean name
- Hangul: 마전역
- Hanja: 麻田驛
- Revised Romanization: Majeon yeok
- McCune–Reischauer: Machŏn yŏk

General information
- Location: 999-25 Majeon-dong, Geomdan District, Incheon
- Coordinates: 37°35′51″N 126°40′02″E
- Operator: Incheon Transit Corporation
- Line: Incheon Line 2
- Platforms: 2
- Tracks: 2

Construction
- Structure type: underground

Key dates
- July 30, 2016: Incheon Line 2 opened
Location

Majeon Station is a subway station on Line 2 of the Incheon Subway.

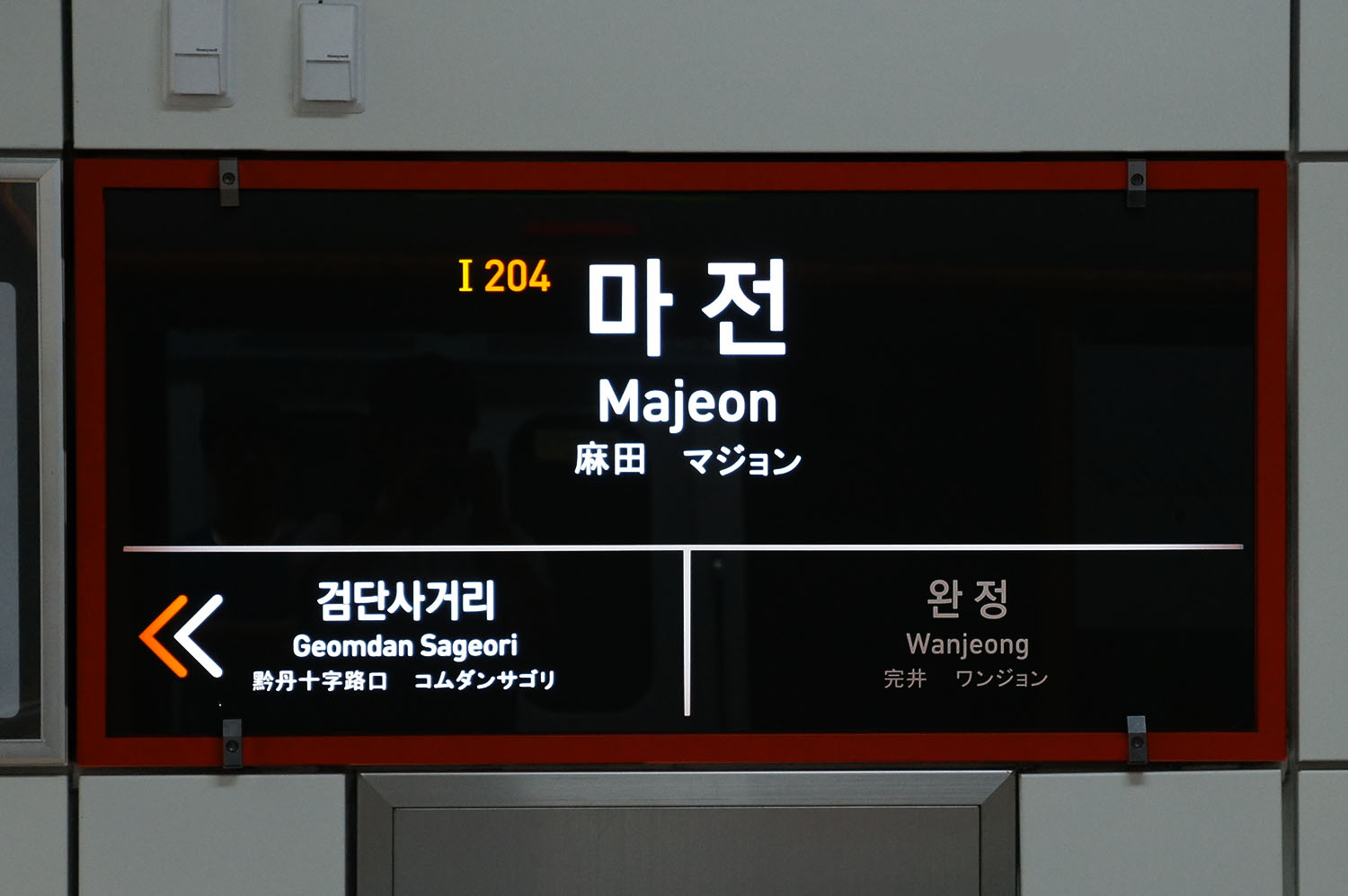

Preceding station	Incheon Subway	Following station
Geomdan Sageori towards Geomdan Oryu	Incheon Line 2	Wanjeong towards Unyeon
