= Gajeong station =

Metro station in Incheon, South Korea

I211 가정 (루원시티) Gajeong (Lu1 City)
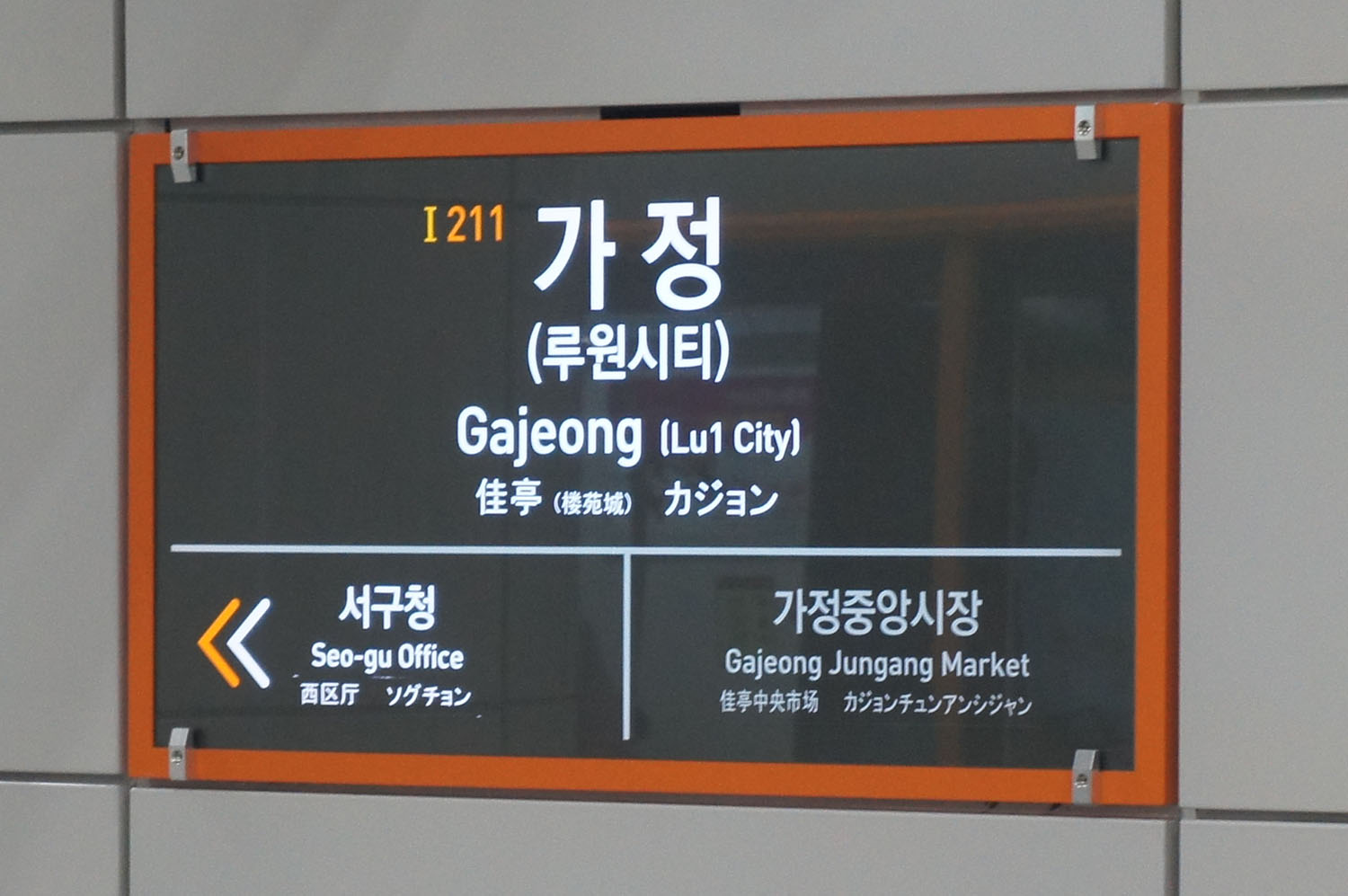

Korean name
- Hangul: 가정역
- Hanja: 佳亭驛
- Revised Romanization: Gajeong yeok
- McCune–Reischauer: Kachŏng yŏk

General information
- Location: 116-5 Gajeong-dong, Seohae District, Incheon
- Coordinates: 37°31′29″N 126°40′31″E
- Operator: Incheon Transit Corporation
- Line: Incheon Line 2
- Platforms: 2
- Tracks: 2

Key dates
- July 30, 2016: Incheon Line 2 opened
Location

Gajeong Station (LU 1 City) is a subway station on Line 2 of the Incheon Subway.

Preceding station	Incheon Subway	Following station
Seohae-gu Office towards Geomdan Oryu	Incheon Line 2	Gajeong Jungang Market towards Unyeon
