= Dokjeong station =

Metro station in Incheon, South Korea

I206 독정 (로얄파크씨티) Dokjeong (Royal Park City)
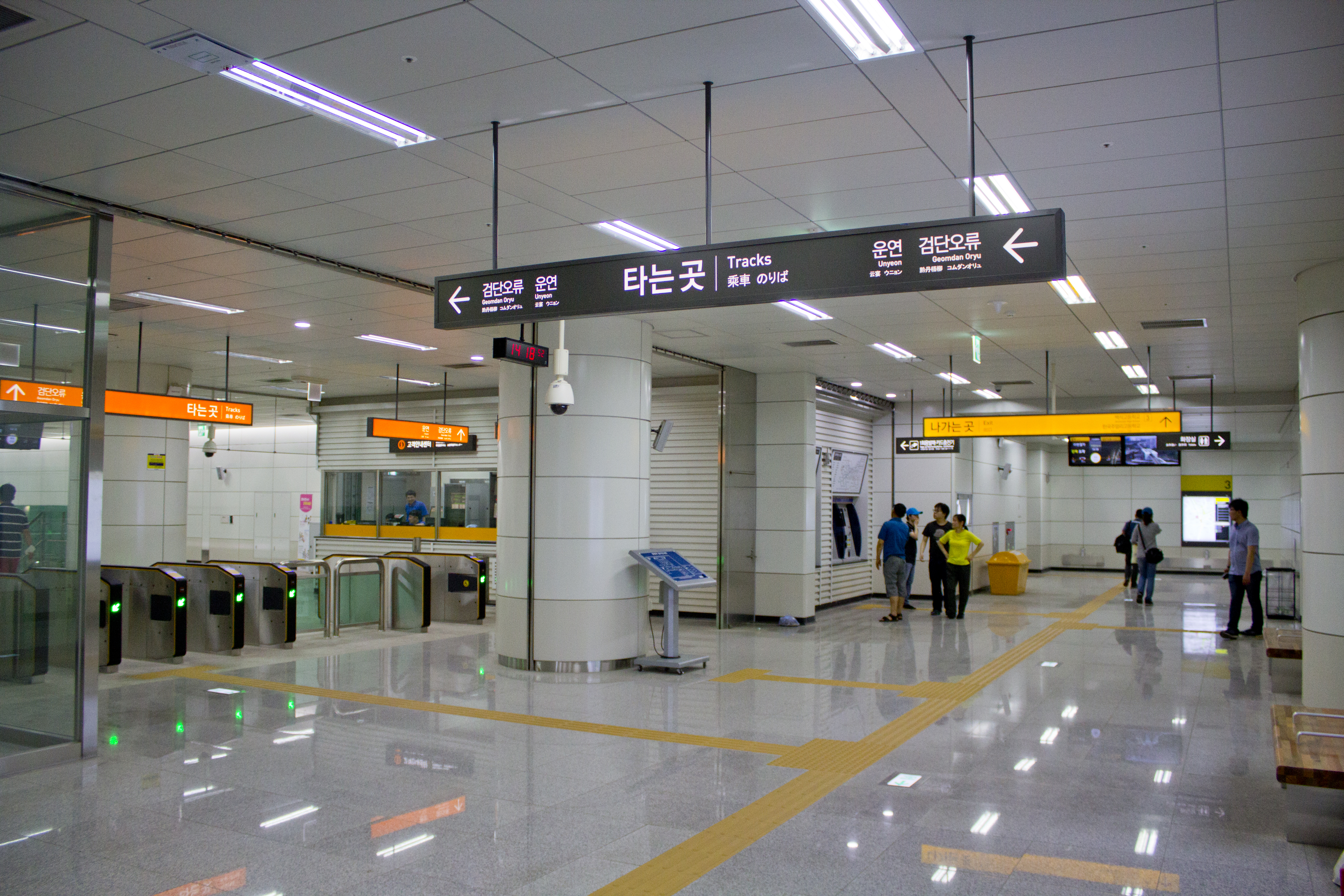

Korean name
- Hangul: 독정역
- Hanja: 篤亭驛
- Revised Romanization: Dokjeong yeok
- McCune–Reischauer: Tokchŏng yŏk

General information
- Location: 74-1 Baekseok-dong, Geomdan District, Incheon
- Coordinates: 37°35′06″N 126°40′34″E
- Operator: Incheon Transit Corporation
- Line: Incheon Line 2
- Platforms: 2
- Tracks: 2

Key dates
- July 30, 2016: Incheon Line 2 opened
Location

Dokjeong Station is a subway station on Line 2 of the Incheon Subway.

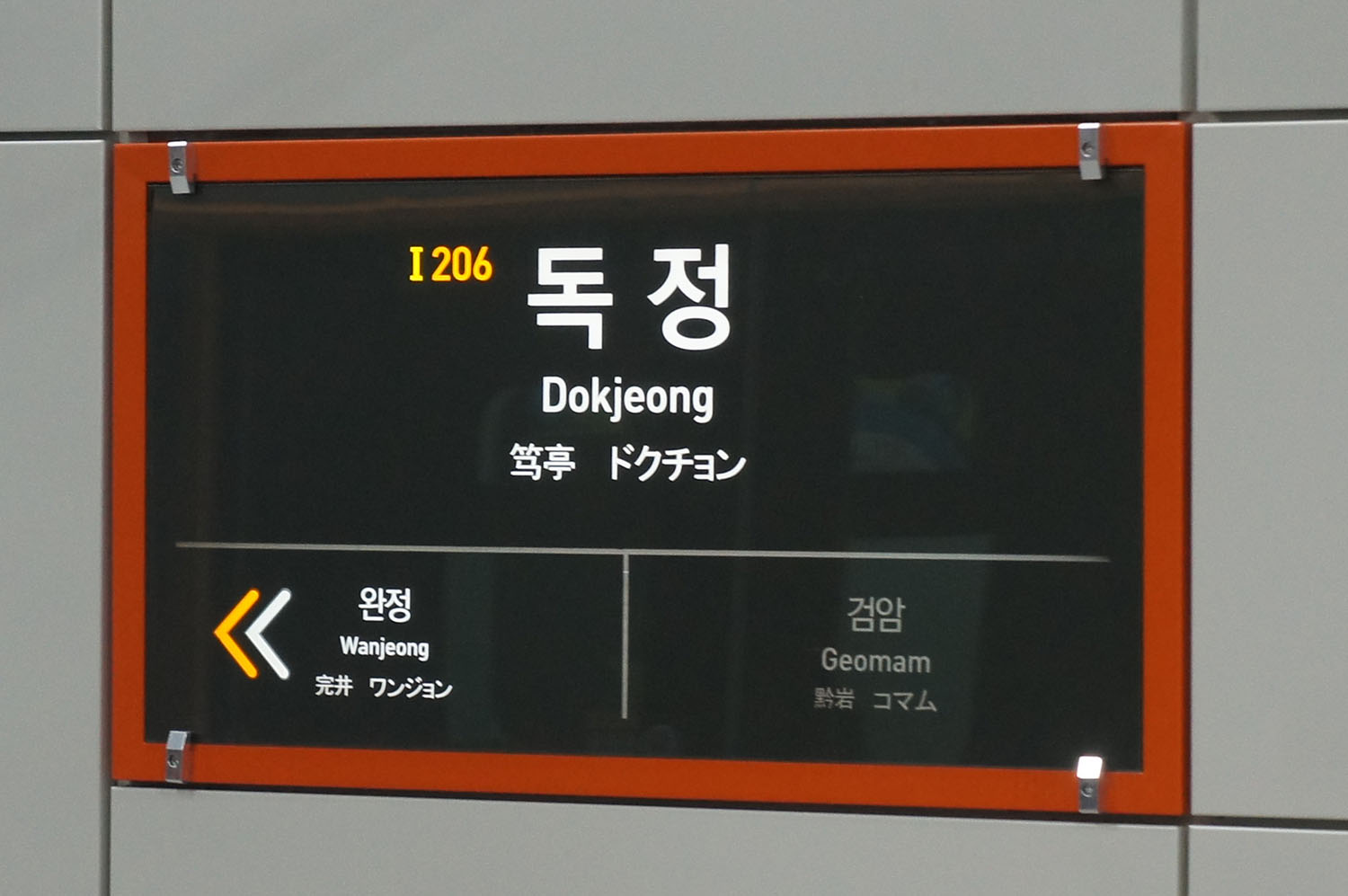

Preceding station	Incheon Subway	Following station
Wanjeong towards Geomdan Oryu	Incheon Line 2	Geomam towards Unyeon
