= Seohae-gu Office station =

Metro station in Incheon, South Korea

I210 서해구청 (가톨릭관동대학교 국제성모병원) Seohae-gu Office (Catholic Kwandong Univ. Int'l St. Mary's Hospital)
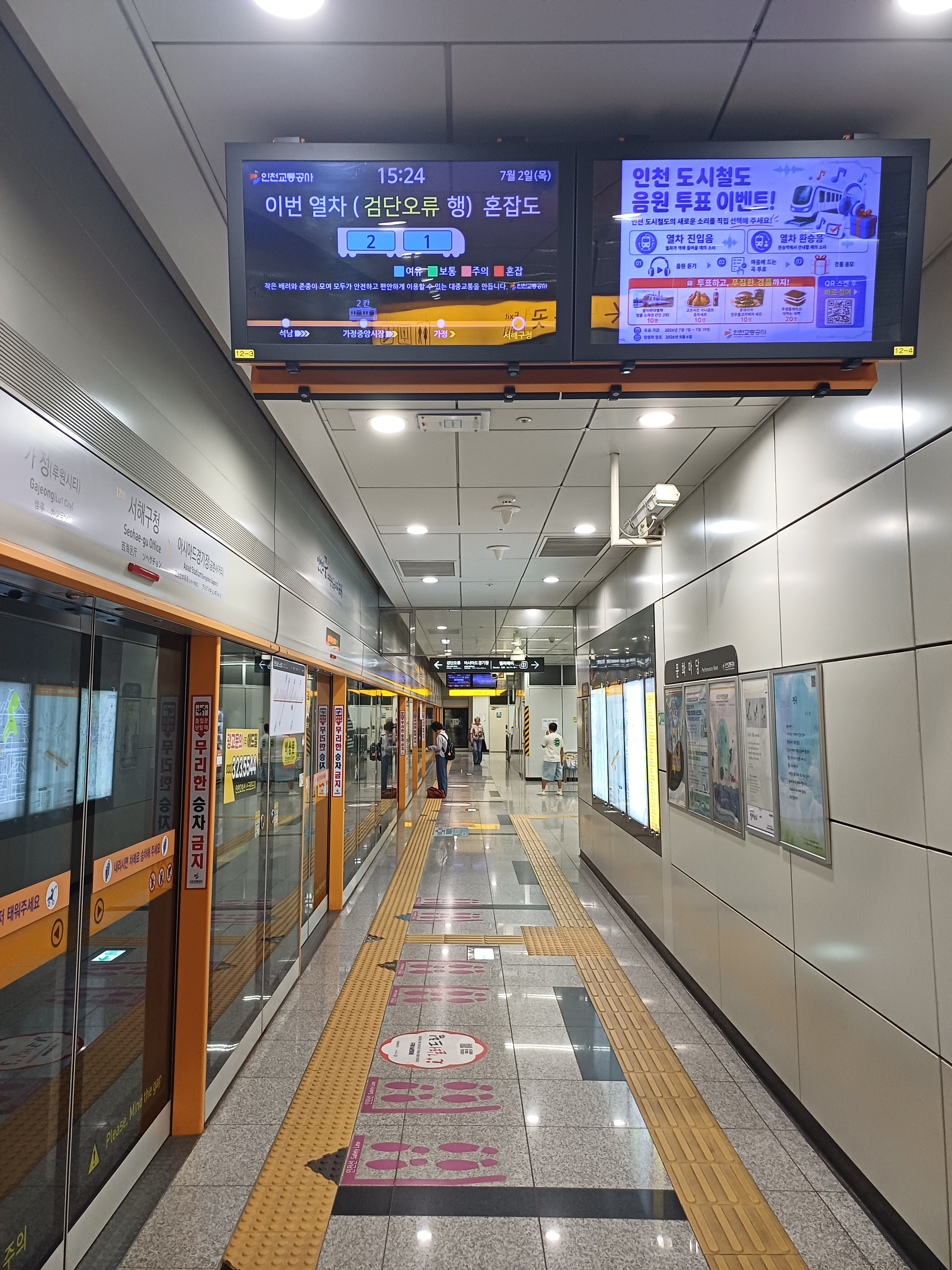
- Station platform

Korean name
- Hangul: 서해구청역
- Hanja: 西海區廳驛
- Revised Romanization: Seohaegucheong yeok
- McCune–Reischauer: Sŏhaekuch'ŏng yŏk

General information
- Location: 7-4 Simgok-dong, Seohae District, Incheon
- Coordinates: 37°32′38″N 126°40′37″E
- Operator: Incheon Transit Corporation
- Line: Incheon Line 2
- Platforms: 2
- Tracks: 2

Key dates
- July 30, 2016: Incheon Line 2 opened
Location

Seohae-gu Office Station is a subway station on Line 2 of the Incheon Subway. It was renamed from Seo-gu Office on July, 1st 2026.

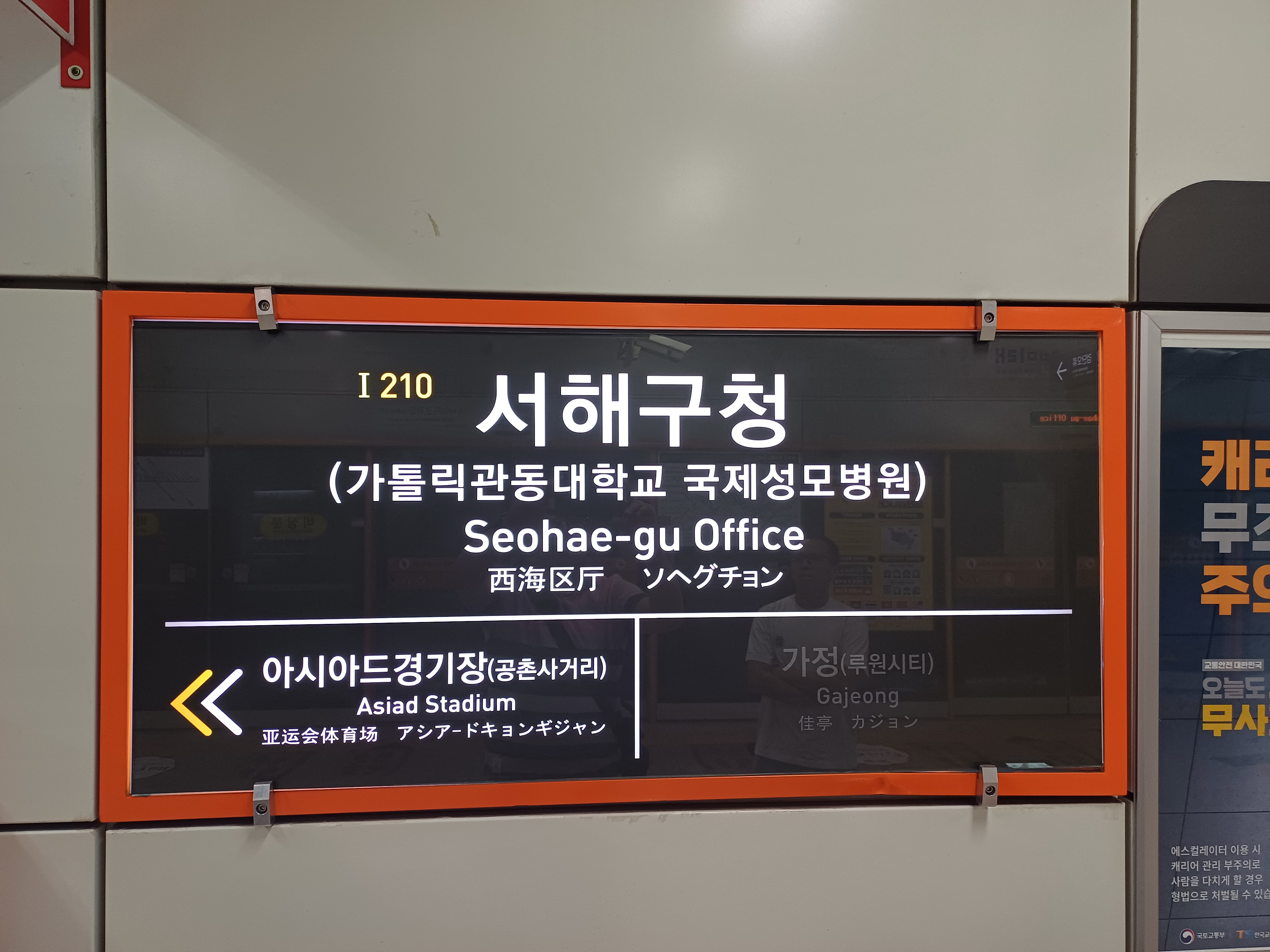
Station nameplate

Preceding station	Incheon Subway	Following station
Asiad Stadium towards Geomdan Oryu	Incheon Line 2	Gajeong towards Unyeon
