= Mansu Station =

Mansu Station may refer to:

- Mansu station (Incheon)
- Mansu station (Hwasun)
