= Namdong-gu Office station =

Metro station in Incheon, South Korea

I225 남동구청 (인천도시공사) Namdong-gu Office (Incheon City Corporation)
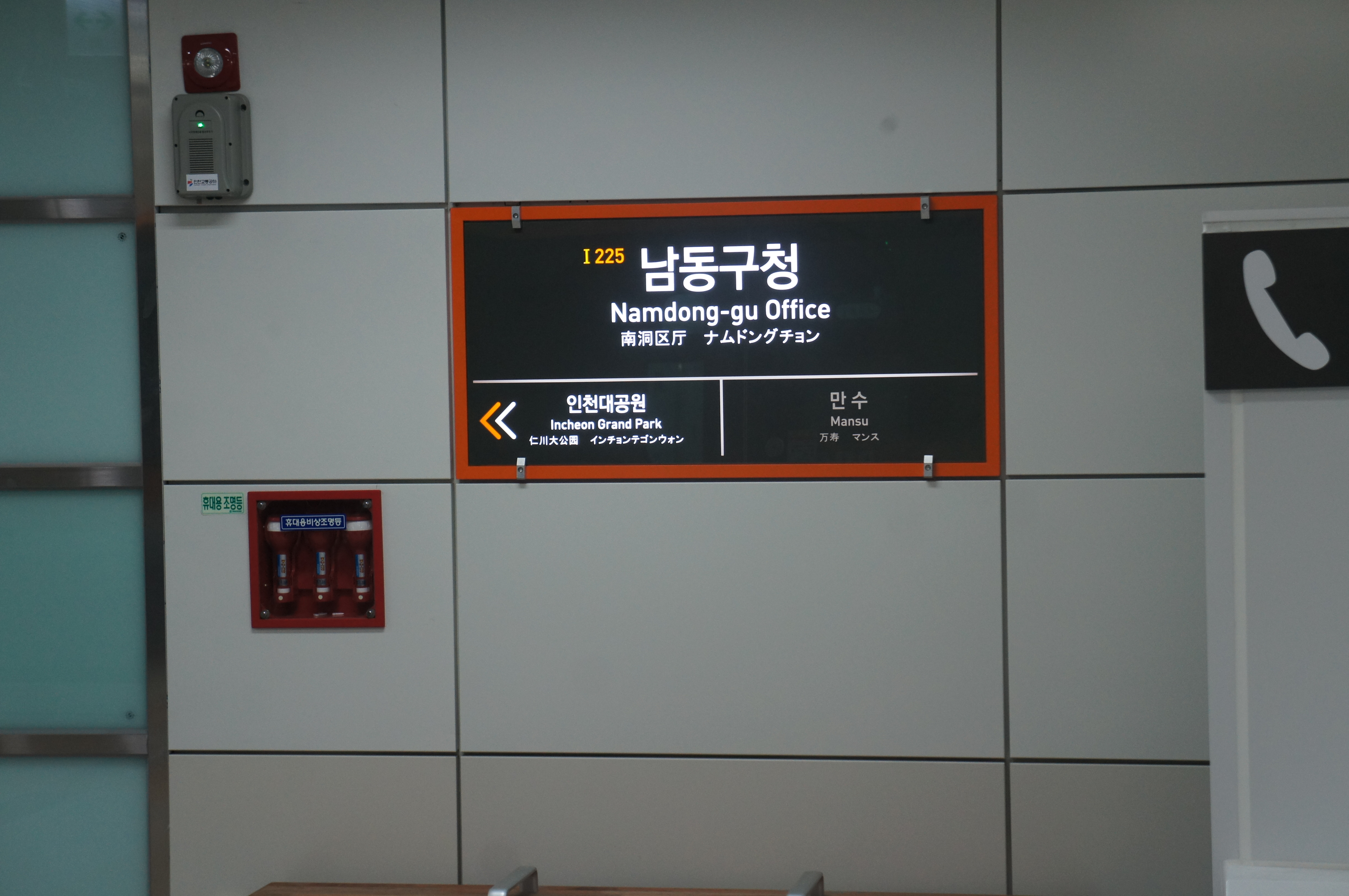

Korean name
- Hangul: 남동구청역
- Hanja: 南洞區廳驛
- Revised Romanization: Namdonggucheong yeok
- McCune–Reischauer: Namtongkuch'ŏng yŏk

General information
- Location: 1006 Mansu-dong, Namdong District, Incheon
- Coordinates: 37°26′53″N 126°44′12″E
- Operator: Incheon Transit Corporation
- Line: Incheon Line 2
- Platforms: 2
- Tracks: 2

Key dates
- July 30, 2016: Incheon Line 2 opened
Location

Namdong-gu Office Station (Korean: 남동구청역) is a subway station on Line 2 of the Incheon Subway.

Preceding station	Incheon Subway	Following station
Mansu towards Geomdan Oryu	Incheon Line 2	Incheon Grand Park towards Unyeon
