= Incheon Grand Park station =

Metro station in Incheon, South Korea

I226 인천대공원 Incheon Grand Park
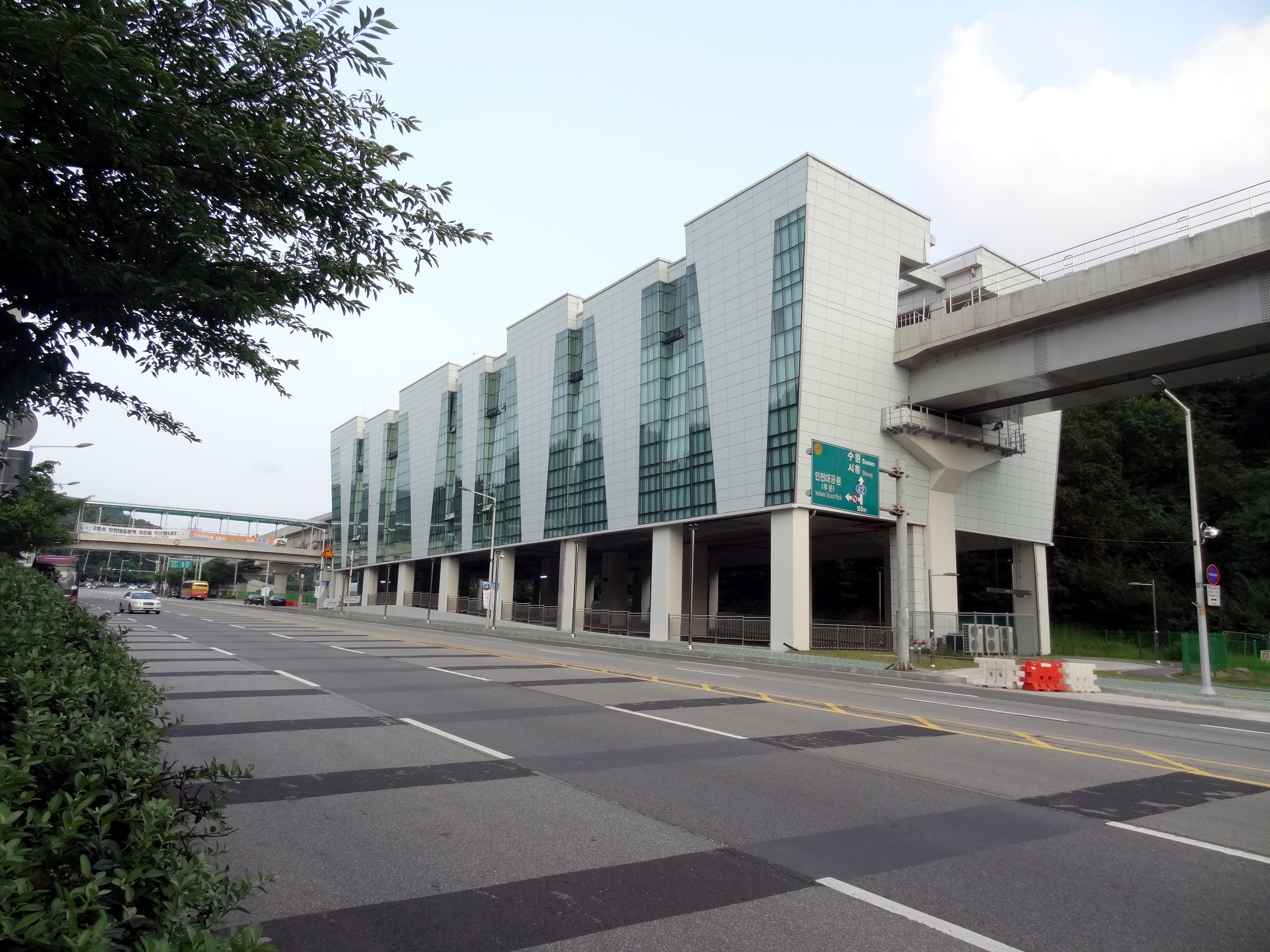

Korean name
- Hangul: 인천대공원역
- Hanja: 仁川大公園驛
- Revised Romanization: Incheon daegongwon yeok
- McCune–Reischauer: Inch'ŏn taegongwŏn yŏk

General information
- Location: 606-9 Jangsu-dong, Namdong District, Incheon
- Coordinates: 37°26′54″N 126°45′11″E
- Operator: Incheon Transit Corporation
- Line: Incheon Line 2
- Platforms: 2
- Tracks: 2

Key dates
- July 30, 2016: Incheon Line 2 opened
Location

Incheon Grand Park Station is a subway station on Line 2 of the Incheon Subway.

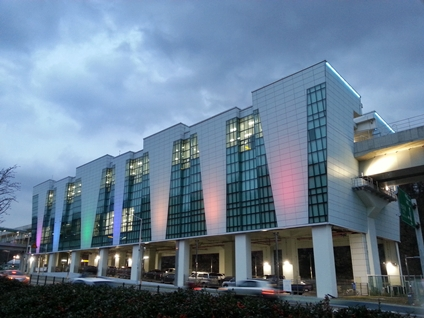
The station at night

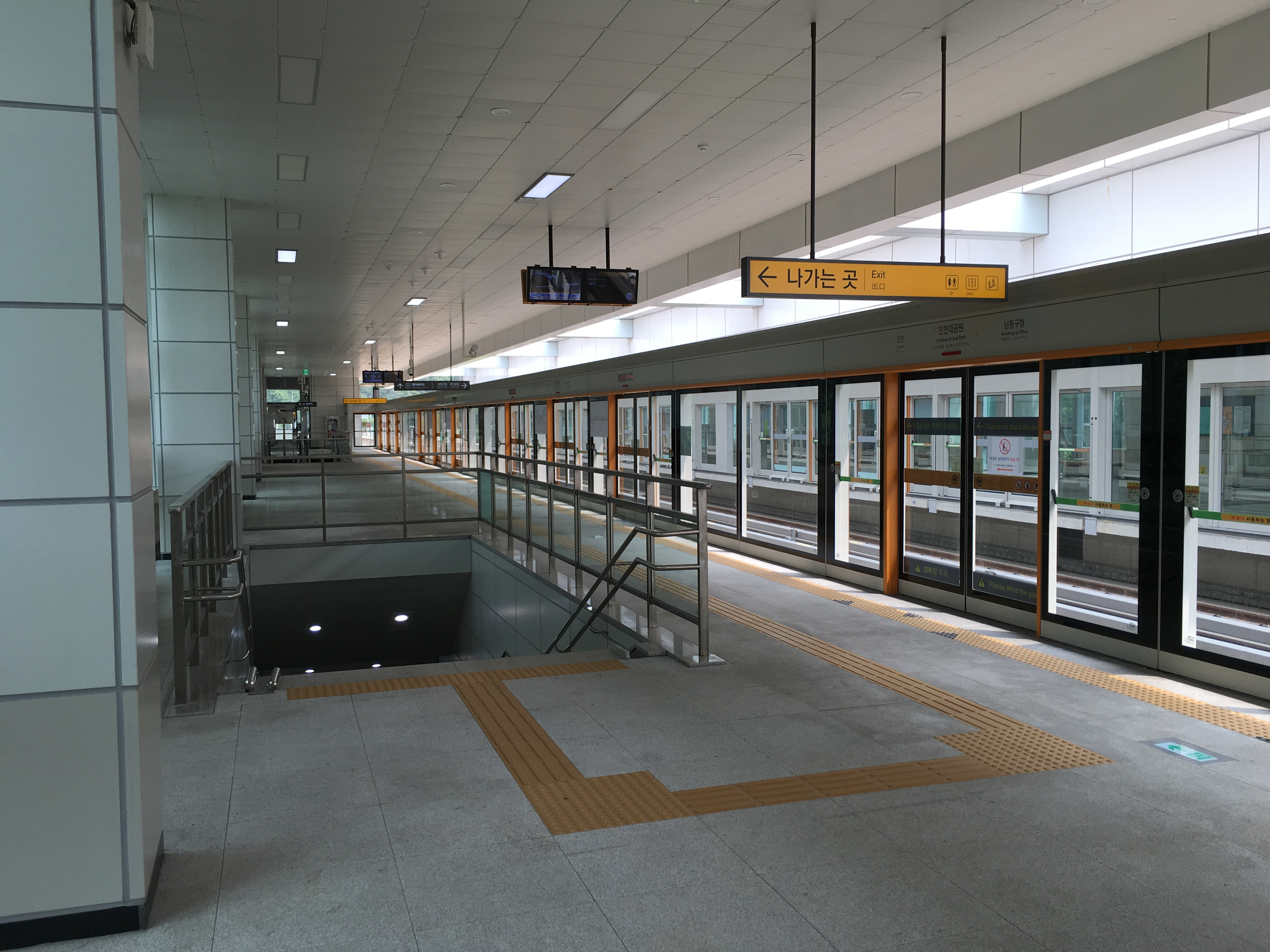
Station platform

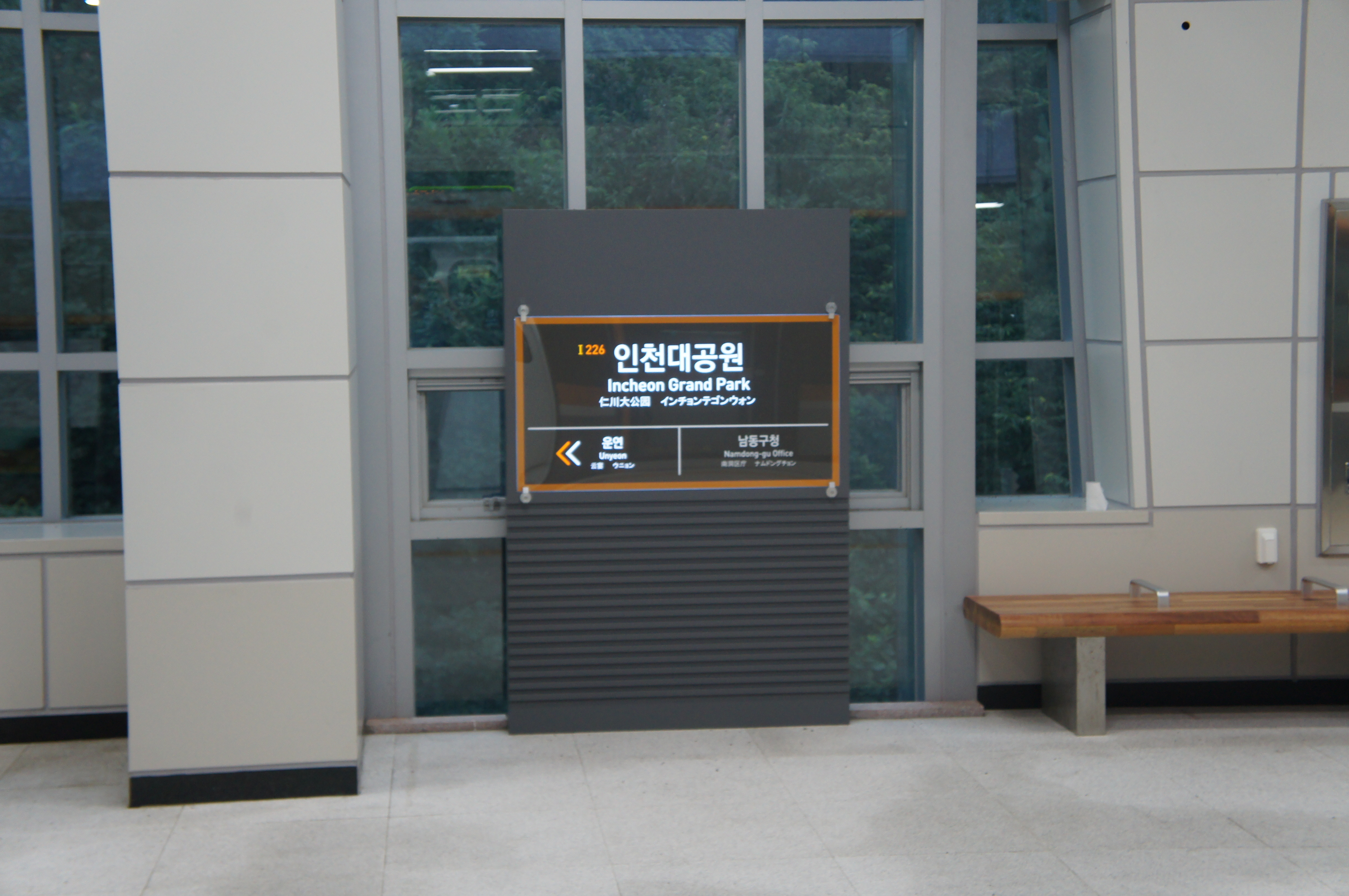
Station nameplate

Preceding station	Incheon Subway	Following station
Namdong-gu Office towards Geomdan Oryu	Incheon Line 2	Unyeon Terminus
