= Mansu station (Incheon) =

Metro station in Incheon, South Korea

I224 만수 Mansu
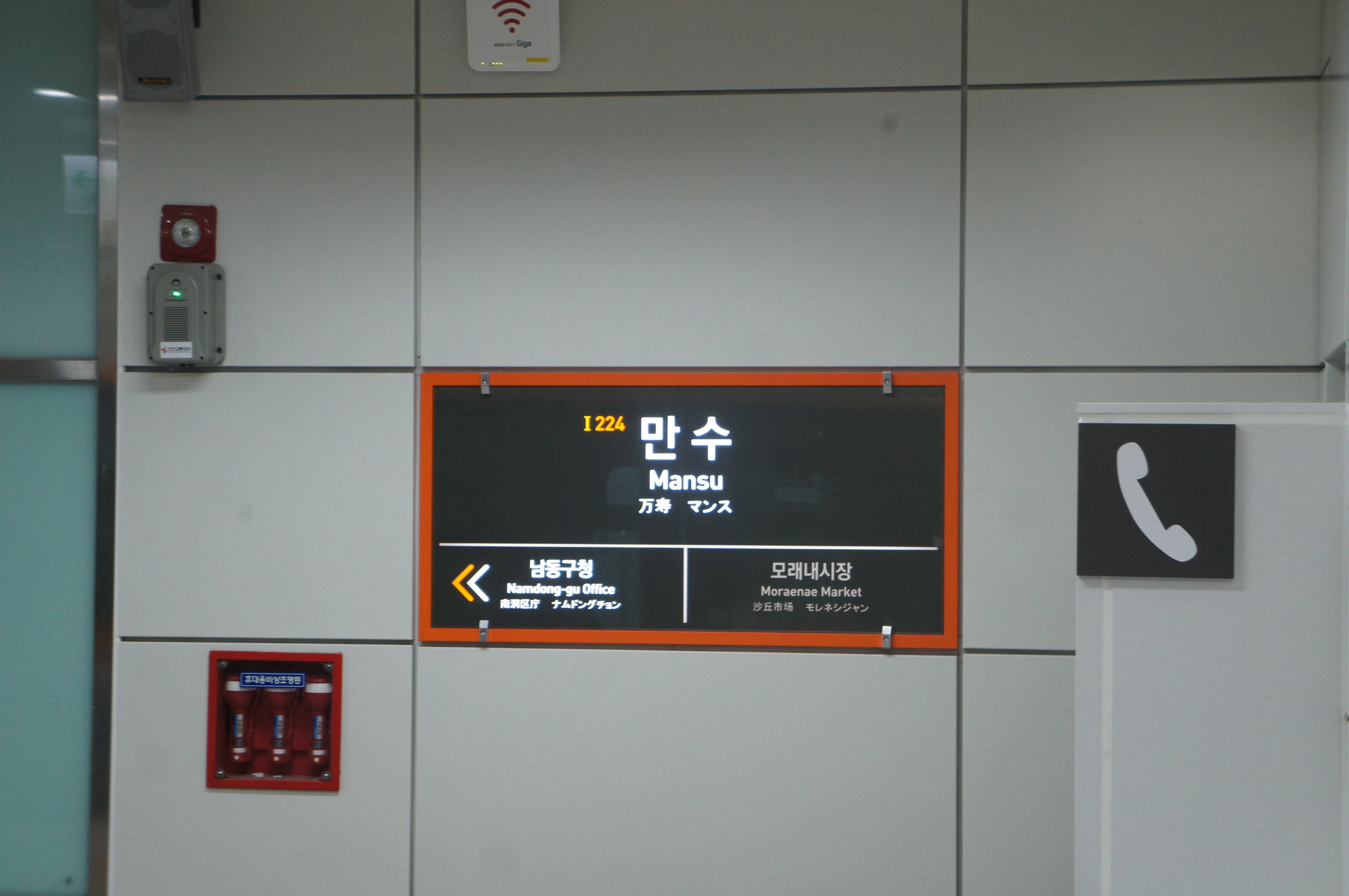

Korean name
- Hangul: 만수역
- Hanja: 萬壽驛
- Revised Romanization: Mansu yeok
- McCune–Reischauer: Mansu yŏk

General information
- Location: 993 Mansu-dong, Namdong District, Incheon
- Coordinates: 37°27′18″N 126°43′55″E
- Operator: Incheon Transit Corporation
- Line: Incheon Line 2
- Platforms: 2
- Tracks: 2

Key dates
- July 30, 2016: Incheon Line 2 opened
Location

Mansu Station is a subway station on Line 2 of the Incheon Subway.

Preceding station	Incheon Subway	Following station
Moraenae Market towards Geomdan Oryu	Incheon Line 2	Namdong-gu Office towards Unyeon
