= Incheon Gajwa station =

Metro station in Incheon, South Korea

I215 인천가좌 (나은병원) Incheon Gajwa (Naeun Hospital)
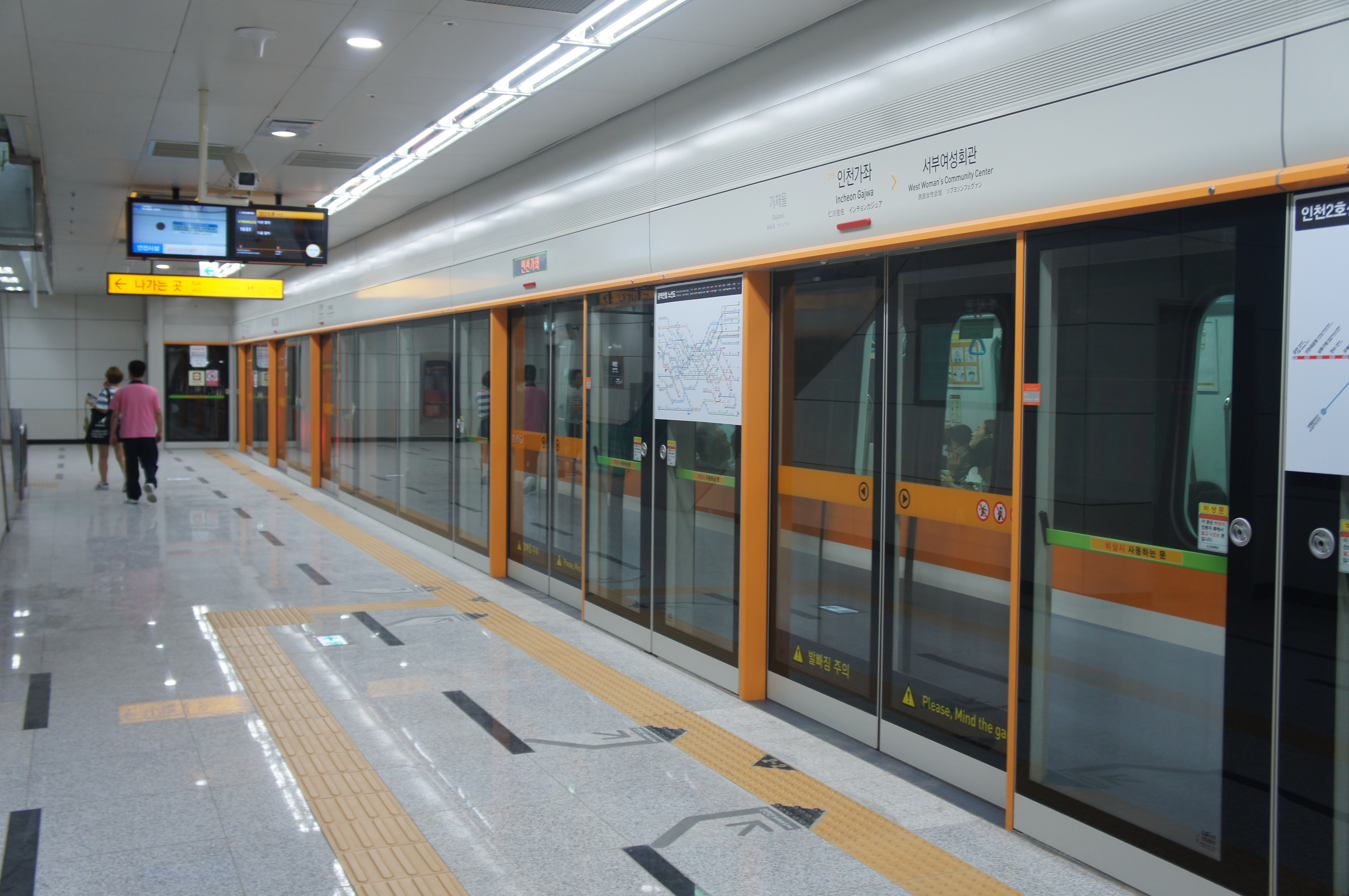

Korean name
- Hangul: 인천가좌역
- Hanja: 仁川佳佐驛
- Revised Romanization: Incheon Gajwa yeok
- McCune–Reischauer: Inch'ŏn Kajwa yŏk

General information
- Location: 110 Gajwa-dong, Seohae District, Incheon
- Coordinates: 37°29′24″N 126°40′23″E
- Operator: Incheon Transit Corporation
- Line: Incheon Line 2
- Platforms: 2
- Tracks: 2

Key dates
- July 30, 2016: Incheon Line 2 opened
Location

Incheon Gajwa Station is a subway station on Line 2 of the Incheon Subway.

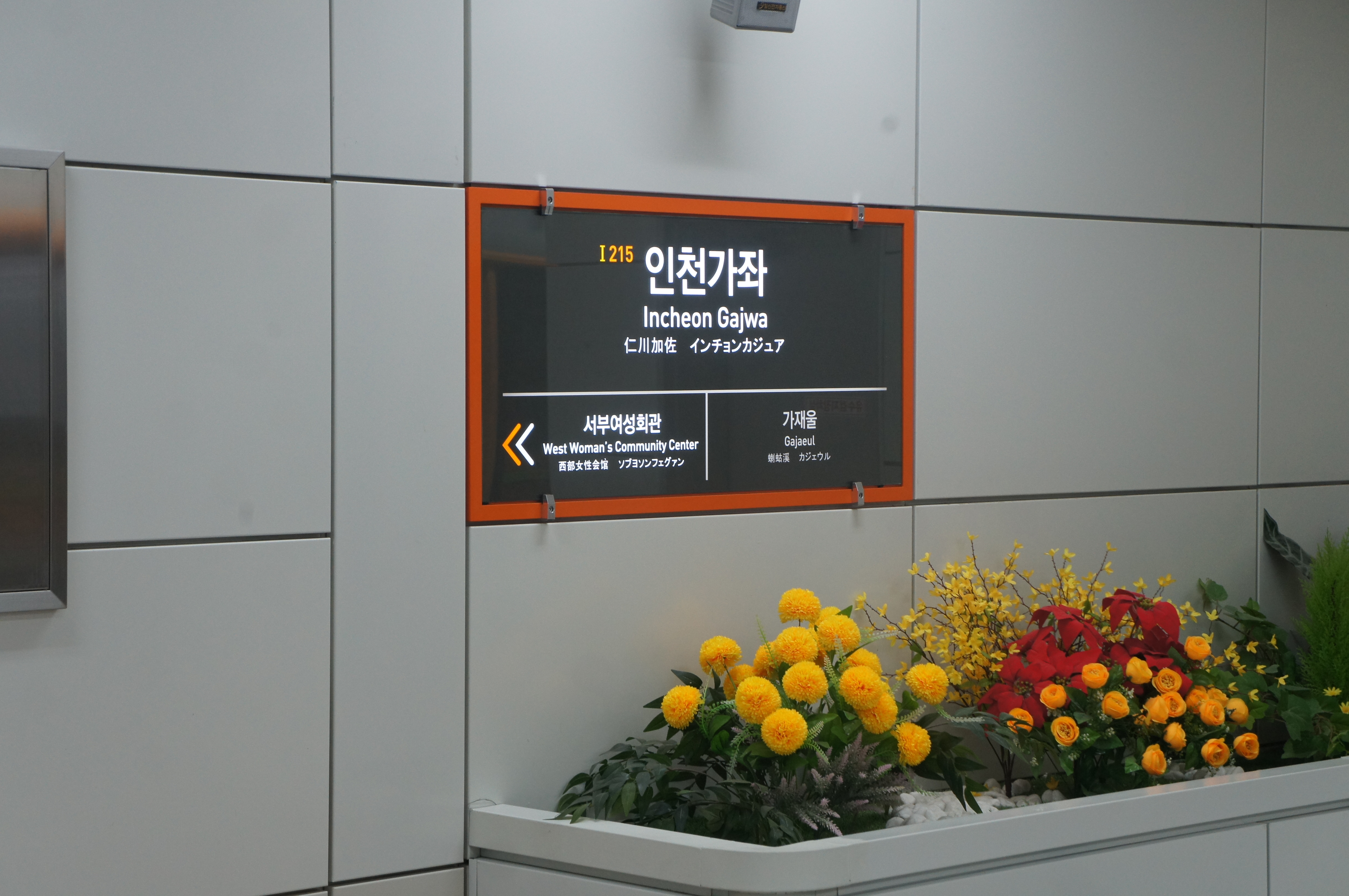
Station nameplate

| Preceding station | Incheon Subway | Following station |
|---|---|---|
| West Woman's Community Center towards Geomdan Oryu | Incheon Line 2 | Gajaeul towards Unyeon |
