= West Woman's Community Center station =

Metro station in Incheon, South Korea

I214 서부여성회관 (그린산부인과) West Woman's Community Center (Green Obstetrics and Gynecology)
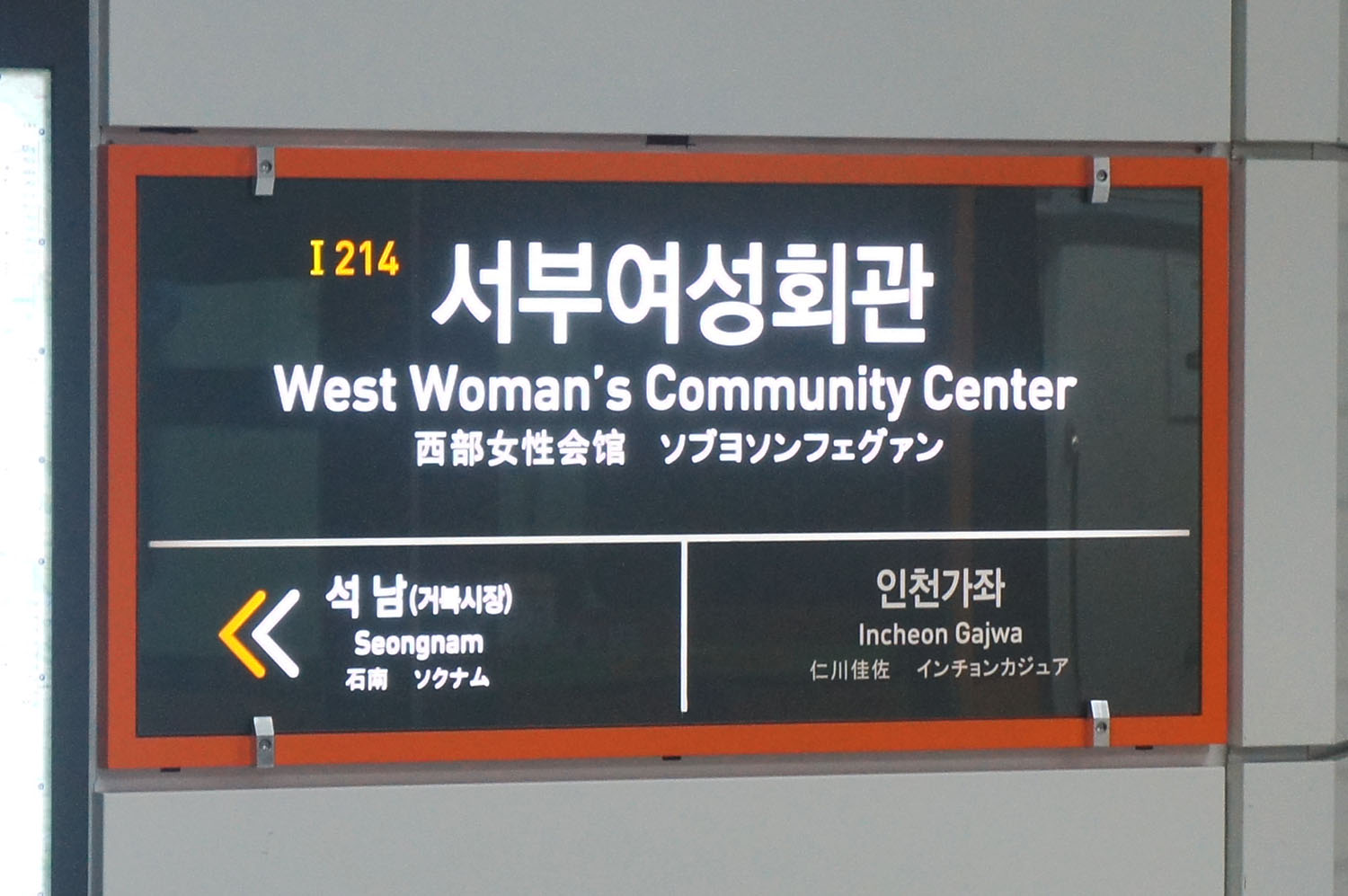

Korean name
- Hangul: 서부여성회관역
- Hanja: 西部女性會館驛
- Revised Romanization: Seobu yeoseong hoegwan yeok
- McCune–Reischauer: Sŏbu yŏsŏng hoegwan yŏk

General information
- Location: 629 Seonknam-dong, Seohae District, Incheon
- Coordinates: 37°30′01″N 126°40′33″E
- Operator: Incheon Transit Corporation
- Line: Incheon Line 2
- Platforms: 2
- Tracks: 2

Key dates
- July 30, 2016: Incheon Line 2 opened
Location

West Woman's Community Center Station is a subway station on Line 2 of the Incheon Subway, Republic of Korea.

Preceding station	Incheon Subway	Following station
Seongnam towards Geomdan Oryu	Incheon Line 2	Incheon Gajwa towards Unyeon
